= Heinrich Ferdinand Mannstein =

German writer (1806–1872)

Heinrich Ferdinand Mannstein, real name Heinrich Ferdinand Steinmann, (16 September 1806 – 3 August 1872) was a German singing teacher, writer and music critic.

== Life ==
Born in Berggießhübel, Mannstein attended the Dresden Kreuzschule and the St. Thomas School, Leipzig as Gymnasiast. At the insistence of his father, he devoted himself to studying theology at the Leipzig University, while also studying music. After some arguments at home, but also due to the general circumstances of his time, he finally joined the singing choir of the court theatre in Dresden in 1829.

Soon after Johann Aloys Miksch took over and completed Mannstein's training as a singer, he left the stage for good to work as a singing teacher and writer. Beyond that Mannstein, developed extensive journalistic activities. His music-critical works are still today an important source for the history of music in Dresden in the middle of the 19th century and offer in this way deepened insights into the then cultivated musical practice.

As one of the first Gabelsberger students he was also a stenographer in the civil service of the royal Saxon chamber since 1839. He remained in this position until his death.

His daughter was the Primadonna Elisabeth Mannstein, wife of Adolph Kohut.

Mannstein died in Dresden at age 65.

== Work ==
=== About music ===
- Das System der großen Gesangschule des Bernacchi von Bologna nebst klassischen, bisher ungedruckten Singübungen von Meistern aus derselben Schule. Arnoldische Buchhandlung, Dresden und Leipzig 1834. MDZ Reader
  - Die große italienische Gesangschule, nebst praktischen Uebungstücken, klassischen, bisher ungedruckten Singübungen von Meistern aus derselben Schule, Arien für den Unterricht. 2te verm. Aufl. des Werkes: „Das System der großen Gesangschule des Bernachi von Bologna“. Arnoldische Buchhandlung, Dresden und Leipzig 1848. MDZ Reader
- Das Königliches Hoftheater Dresden, in künstlerischer und administrativer Hinsicht; beleuchtet von einem Kenner der Kunst und Freunde der Wahrheit. Ein kleines Taschenbuch für Schauspieler und Schauspielfreunde. Otto Wigand, Leipzig 1838.
- Die gesammte Praktik der klassischen Gesangkunst. Ein Handbuch für Componisten, Gesanglehrer, Saenger, Cantoren und alle Kenner und Verehrer der Kunst. Arnoldische Buchhandlung, Dresden und Leipzig 1839.
- Vollständiges Verzeichniß aller Compositionen des Churf. Sächs. Kapellmeisters Naumann. Dresden 1841.
- Geschichte, Geist und Ausübung des Gesanges von Pope Gregory I bis auf unsere Zeit. B. G. Teubner, Leipzig 1845. MDZ Reader
- Denkwürdigkeiten der churfürstlichen und königlichen Hofmusik zu Dresden im 18. und 19. Jahrhundert. Nach geheimen Papieren und Mittheilungen. Enthaltend: Lebensbilder von Johann Aloys Miksc und seinen Schülern: Alphonso Zesi, Johann Gottfried Bergmann, Wilhelmine Schröder-Devrient, Agnese Schebest, Naumann, Carl Maria von Weber, Morlacchi, Antonio Peregrino Benelli etc. Heinrich Mattes, Leipzig 1863 MDZ Reader
- Katechismus des Gesanges im Lichte der Naturwissenschaften, der Sprache und Logik. Heinrich Mattes, Leipzig 1864.
- Den Manen des größten Sängers und Darstellers Ludwig Schnorr von Carolsfeld K. S. Hofopernsänger, geb. am 2. Juli 1836, gest. am 21. Juli 1865, geweiht. Ernst & Portèger, Dresden 1865.

=== Short stories ===
- Der Herzog von R........ und seine Freunde. 2 Teile. Arnoldische Buchhandlung, Dresden und Leipzig 1833.
- Des Schmalkaldischen Bundes Untergang und Rächer. Eine historisch-romantische Erzählung. Arnoldische Buchhandlung, Dresden und Leipzig 1833.
- Der Schwedenkönig Gustav Adolph. Romantisch-kriegerisches Gemälde. Arnoldische Buchhandlung, Dresden und Leipzig 1834.
  - First part Numerised
  - Second part Numerised
- Marchese Pensorosa. Novelle und, die Leiden einer großen Seele. Erzählung. Arnoldische Buchhandlung, Dresden und Leipzig 1836. Numerised
- Der Aufstand in Stralsund, geschichtliche Novelle, und Mirabeau's Tod. Novellette. Arnoldische Buchhandlung, Dresden uad Leipzig 1838.
- Die Mystiker. Novelle und, der Arzt als Scharfrichter. Ein Lebens- und Reisebild. Arnoldische Buchhandlung, Dresden und Leipzig 1839. Numerised
- Sachsen-Spiegel. Ein episches Gedicht. Dresden 1849.
- Klegin von seinem Hügel. Dresden 1854.

=== Lexicons ===
- Ober- und niedersächsisches Adelslexikon. Erstes Heft. Arnoldische Buchhandlung, Dresden und Leipzig 1843. MDZ Reader

=== Stenography ===
- Lehrbuch der Gabelsberger'schen Stenographie. Von den königlich sächsischen Stenographen Moritz Heyde, Karl Krause and H. F. Steinmann. Meinhold, Dresden 1853.
