= Kohaut =

Kohaut is a surname. Notable people with the surname include:

- Franz Kohaut (died 1822), Czech botanical collector and gardener
- Karl Kohaut (1726–1784), Austrian lutenist and composer of Czech descent

== See also ==
- Kohout
- Kohut
