= Kohut =

Kohut is a surname of Slavic origin. It is connected with the Czech name Kohout, Polish name Kogut and Slovak name Kohút, all meaning 'rooster'. Notable people with the surname include:

- Adolph Kohut (1848–1917), German-Hungarian journalist and historian
- Andrew Kohut (1942–2015), American pollster
- Alexander Kohut (1842–1894), Hungarian-American rabbi and orientalist
- Bohdan Kohut (born 1987), Ukrainian footballer
- George Alexander Kohut (1874–1933), American rabbi, writer and bibliographer
- George Kohut (1943–2014), American camera operator
- Heinz Kohut (1913–1981), American psychoanalyst
- Ihor Kohut (born 1996), Ukrainian footballer
- Józef Kohut (1922–1970), Polish ice hockey player
- Łukasz Kohut (born 1982), Polish politician
- Michael J. Kohut (1943–2012), American audio engineer
- Oleksandra Kohut (born 1987), Austrian-Ukrainian freestyle wrestler
- Oswald Kohut (1877–1951), German writer
- Rebekah Bettelheim Kohut (1864–1951), American Jewish women's leader
- Ron Cahute (1955–2023), Ukrainian-Canadian musician
- Sławomir Kohut (born 1977), Polish cyclist
- Stacy Kohut (born 1970), Canadian Paralympic skier
- Vilmos Kohut (1906–1986), Hungarian footballer
- Walter Kohut (1927–1980), Austrian actor
- Zenon Kohut (born 1944), Canadian historian

== See also ==
- Elisabeth Kohut-Mannstein (1843–1926), German soprano
- Jean-Pierre Kohut-Svelko (born 1946), French production designer and art director
