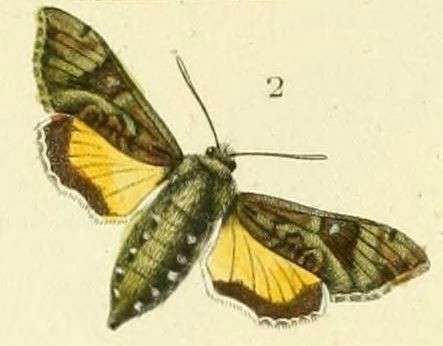

Scientific classification
- Domain: Eukaryota
- Kingdom: Animalia
- Phylum: Arthropoda
- Class: Insecta
- Order: Lepidoptera
- Family: Sphingidae
- Subtribe: Macroglossina
- Genus: Microsphinx; Rothschild & Jordan, 1903
- Species: M. pumilum

Binomial name
- Microsphinx pumilum (Boisduval, 1875)

Synonyms
- Pterogon pumilum Boisduval, 1875; Lophuron minutum Distant, 1897

= Microsphinx =

Genus of moths

Microsphinx is a genus of moths in the family Sphingidae, consisting of one species, Microsphinx pumilum, which is known from South Africa.

It is similar to Sphingonaepiopsis species. For instance, the forewing upperside is similar to Sphingonaepiopsis kuldjaensis, but with more conspicuous longitudinal narrow stripes. The abdomen upperside has distinct lines and grey dots. The hindwing upperside is yellow with a brown marginal band of even width.
