= Julius Stern =

German musician (1820–1883)

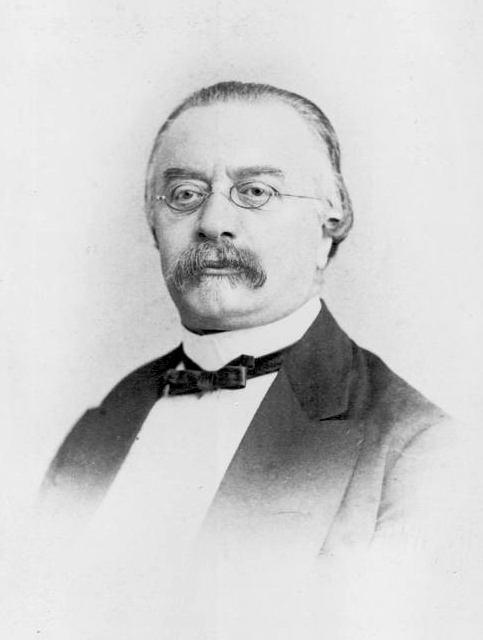
Julius Stern

Julius Stern (8 August 1820 – 27 February 1883) was a Jewish German musical pedagogue and composer.

== Biography ==
Stern was born at Breslau. He received his elementary education in music from the violinist Peter Lüstner, and at the age of nine played at concerts. In 1832 his parents removed to Berlin, where Stern studied first under Ludwig Wilhelm Maurer, Moritz Ganz, and Saint-Lubin, and later under Rungenhagen at the Königliche Akademie der Künste. As a result of several compositions which he had written while a pupil of the academy, King Frederick William IV of Prussia, who was an ardent lover of art, granted Stern a stipend which enabled him to pursue his studies. He went to Dresden, where he received instruction from Johann Aloys Miksch; and thence to Paris, where he subsequently was appointed leader of the Deutscher Gesangverein Society. While in the latter city he conducted, among other works, the incidental music by Mendelssohn to Sophocles' Antigone.

In 1846, Stern returned to Berlin, where, in the following year, he founded the Stern Gesangverein. The first performance of Mendelssohn's oratorio Elijah (October 1847) established Stern's reputation as one of the foremost conductors of his day, and his choir constantly increased in size and efficiency, so that the repertoire of the society soon embraced not only the standard works of Handel, Haydn, and Bach, but also those of contemporary composers. In 1872, the Gesangverein celebrated its twenty-fifth anniversary amid great enthusiasm; two years later Stern was compelled to resign his directorship on account of ill health.

Of even greater importance for the development of music was the Stern Conservatory, founded conjointly in 1850 by Stern, Theodor Kullak and Adolf Bernhard Marx. On the resignation of Kullak in 1855, and of Marx in 1857, Stern became sole proprietor of the institution, which he managed until his death. From 1869 to 1871, he conducted the Berlin Symphony Orchestra, and from 1873 to 1874 the concerts in the Reichshalle, where he found an opportunity of carrying out his favorite idea of bringing the works of talented young musicians before the public. In 1849, he received the title of "Royal Musical Director," and in 1860 that of "Professor."

Stern died at Berlin in 1883, aged 62.

== Bibliography ==
- Richard Stern, Erinnerungsblätter an Julius Stern, Berlin, 1886;
- Mendel, Musikalisches Konversations-Lexikon;
- Riemann, Musik-Lexikon;
- Meyers Konversations-Lexikon.
