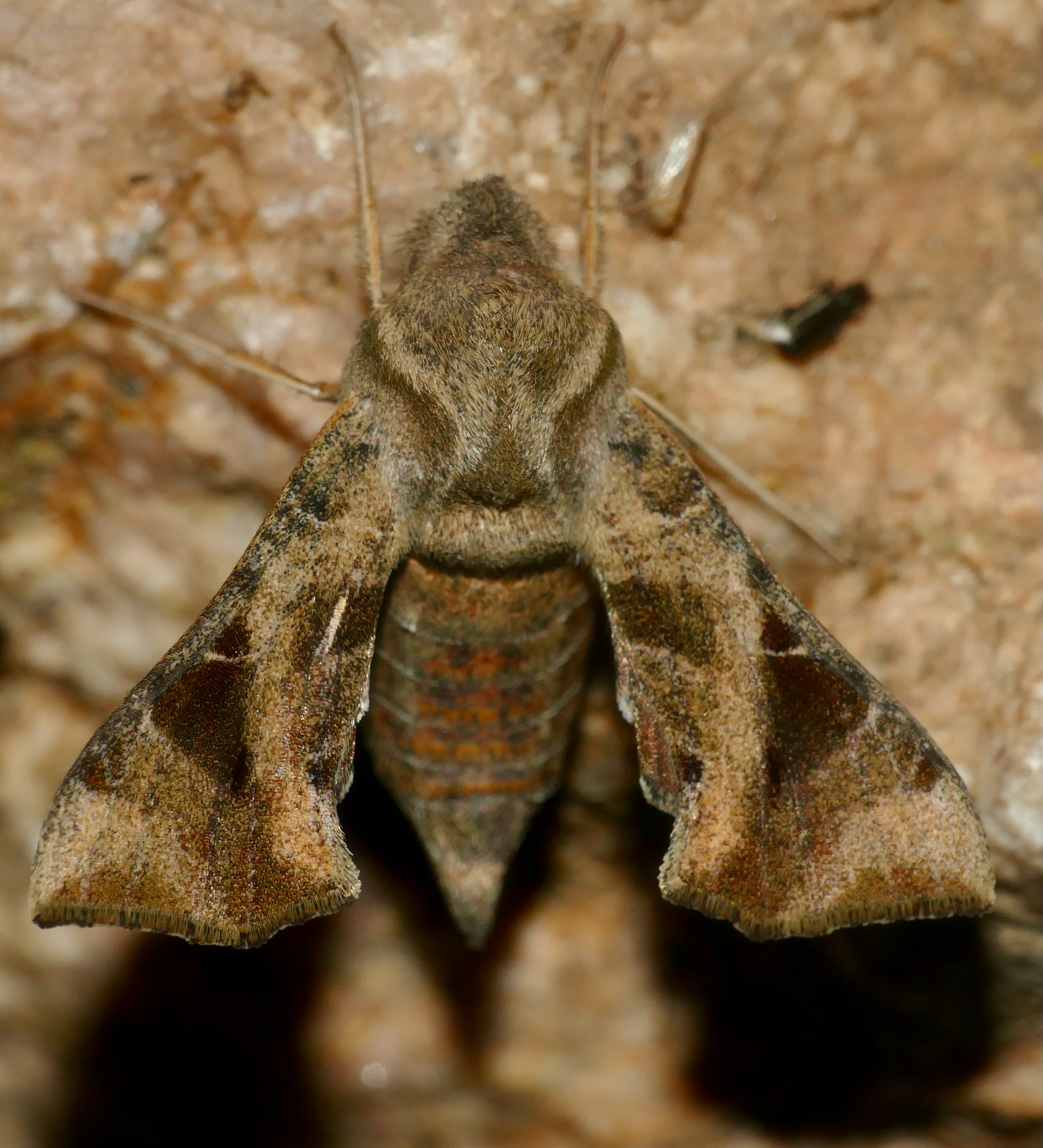

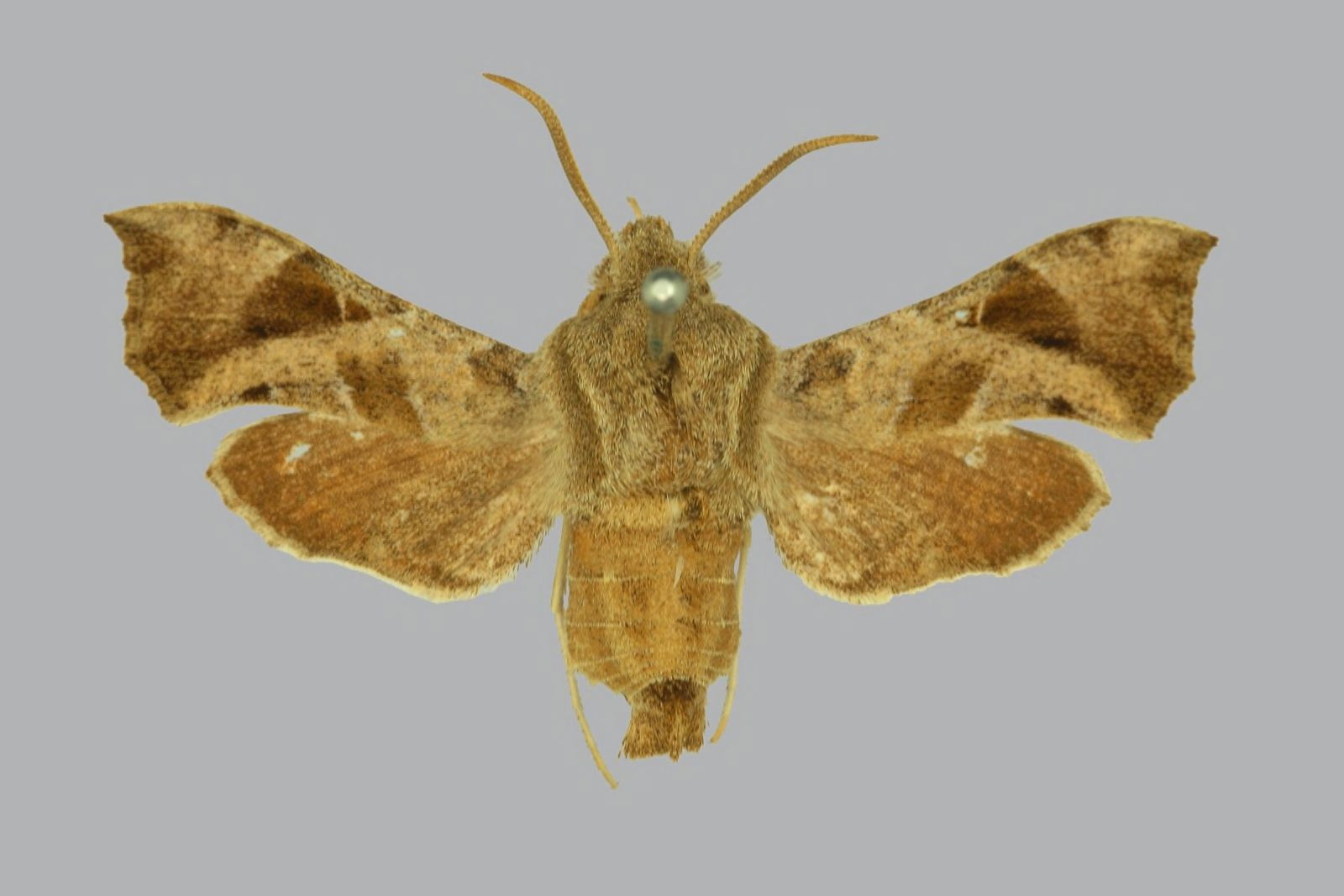
- From South Africa (above) and Yemen (mounted specimen)

Scientific classification
- Domain: Eukaryota
- Kingdom: Animalia
- Phylum: Arthropoda
- Class: Insecta
- Order: Lepidoptera
- Family: Sphingidae
- Genus: Sphingonaepiopsis
- Species: S. nana

Binomial name
- Sphingonaepiopsis nana (Walker, 1856)

Synonyms
- Lophura nana Walker, 1856; Lophura nanum Boisduval, 1847; Sphingonaepiopsis gracilipes Wallengren, 1858; Sphingonaepiopsis nanum Boisduval, 1875

= Sphingonaepiopsis nana =

Savanna hawkmoth

Species of moth

Sphingonaepiopsis nana, the savanna hawkmoth, is a moth of the family Sphingidae. The species was first described by Francis Walker in 1856. It is found from the Kerman Province, Hormozgan Province and Baluchistan in southern Iran and western Saudi Arabia to the southern Arabian Peninsula (including the United Arab Emirates, northern Oman and Yemen) and eastern Africa to Natal, west to the Gambia.

The wingspan is 25–30 mm. Adults are on wing in March and April. A specimen captured in early October indicates there might be a second generation.

The larvae feed on various Rubiaceae species, including Kohautia, Galium, Rubia and Jaubertia.
