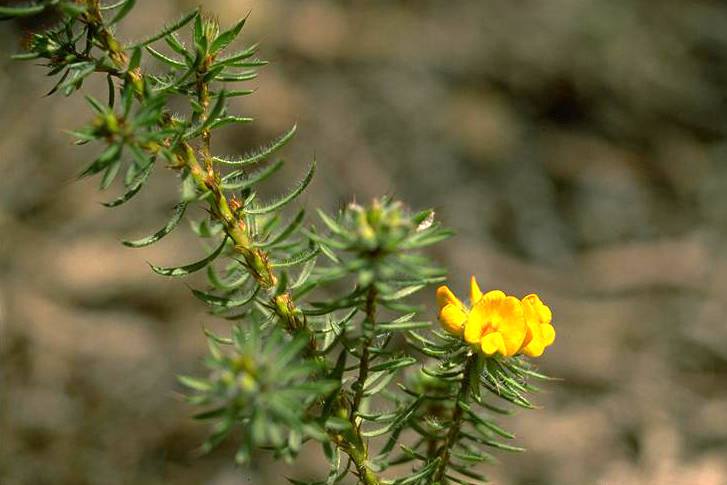
- In the Australian National Botanic Gardens

Scientific classification
- Kingdom: Plantae
- Clade: Tracheophytes
- Clade: Angiosperms
- Clade: Eudicots
- Clade: Rosids
- Order: Fabales
- Family: Fabaceae
- Subfamily: Faboideae
- Genus: Pultenaea
- Species: P. echinula

Binomial name
- Pultenaea echinula Sieber ex DC.

= Pultenaea echinula =

Curved bush-pea

Species of flowering plant

Pultenaea echinula, commonly known as curved bush-pea, is a species of flowering plant in the family Fabaceae and is endemic to a small area of New South Wales. It is an erect shrub with linear, needle-shaped, grooved leaves, and dense clusters of yellow to orange and red flowers.

== Description ==
Pultenaea echinula is an erect shrub that typically grows to a height of up to 1 m (3 ft 3 in) and has stems that are more or less glabrous. The leaves are arranged alternately, linear to needle-shaped, 9–15 mm (0.35–0.59 in) long and 0.5–1.0 mm (0.020–0.039 in) wide with a groove along the upper surface. The leaves are covered with small pimples and there are stipules about 3 mm (0.12 in) long at the base. The flowers are arranged in dense clusters without bracts on the ends of branchlets. The flowers are about 10 mm (0.39 in) long on pedicels 0.5–1.5 mm (0.020–0.059 in) long with narrow egg-shaped bracteoles 1.5–2 mm (0.059–0.079 in) long attached below the base of the sepal tube. The sepals are about 4 mm (0.16 in) long, the standard petal 8.0–8.8 mm (0.31–0.35 in) long, yellow to orange with reddish stripes, the wings are yellow to orange and the keel is red. The ovary is glabrous except at the tip and the fruit is a pod 5–6 mm (0.20–0.24 in) long.

== Taxonomy and naming ==
Pultenaea echinula was first formally described in 1825 by Augustin Pyramus de Candolle in Prodromus Systematis Naturalis Regni Vegetabilis from an unpublished description by Franz Sieber.

== Distribution and habitat ==
This pultenaea grows in forest, often on rocky hillsides in the Wollemi area and in the upper Blue Mountains.
