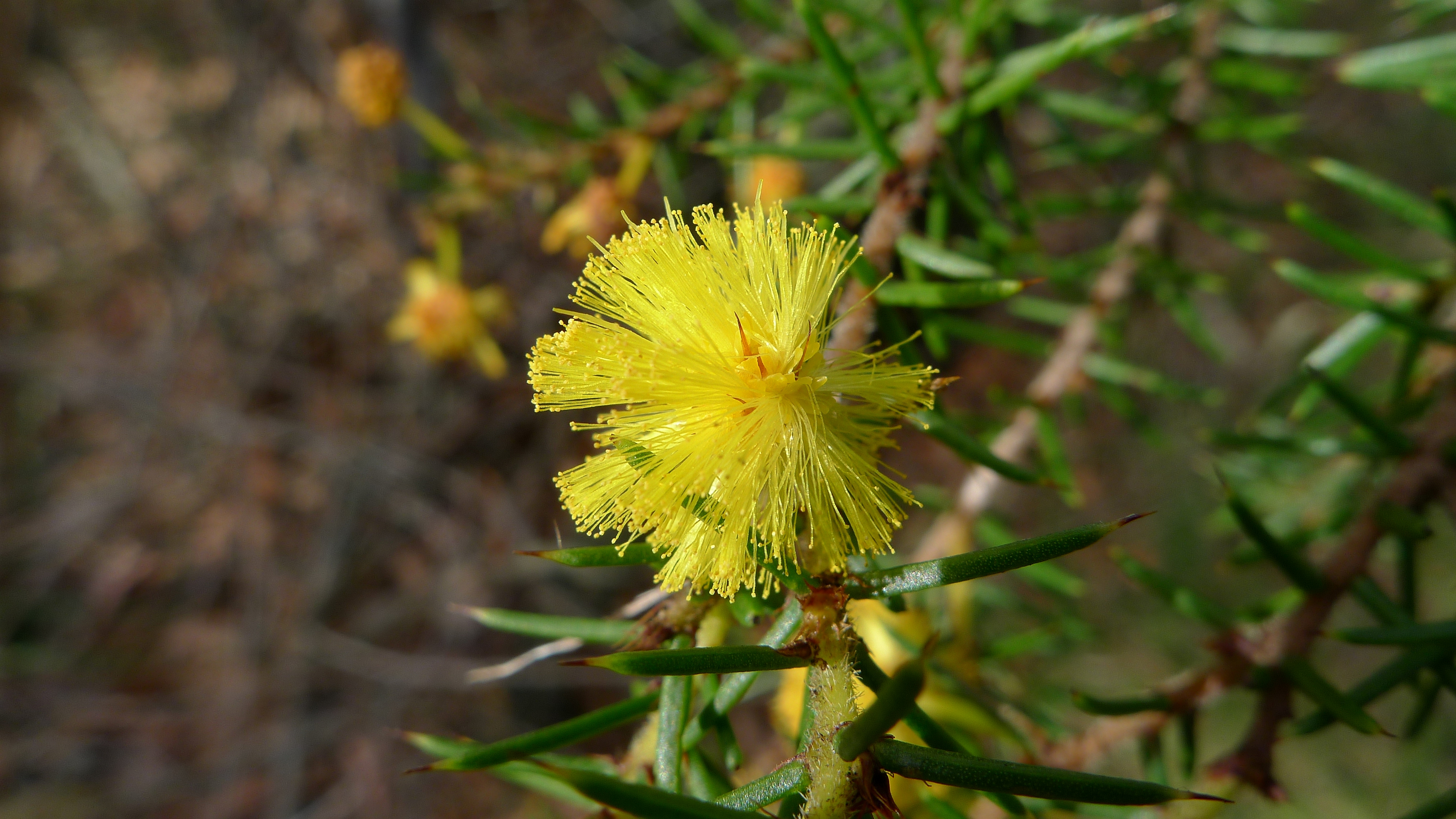

Scientific classification
- Kingdom: Plantae
- Clade: Tracheophytes
- Clade: Angiosperms
- Clade: Eudicots
- Clade: Rosids
- Order: Fabales
- Family: Fabaceae
- Subfamily: Caesalpinioideae
- Clade: Mimosoid clade
- Genus: Acacia
- Species: A. echinula

Binomial name
- Acacia echinula DC.
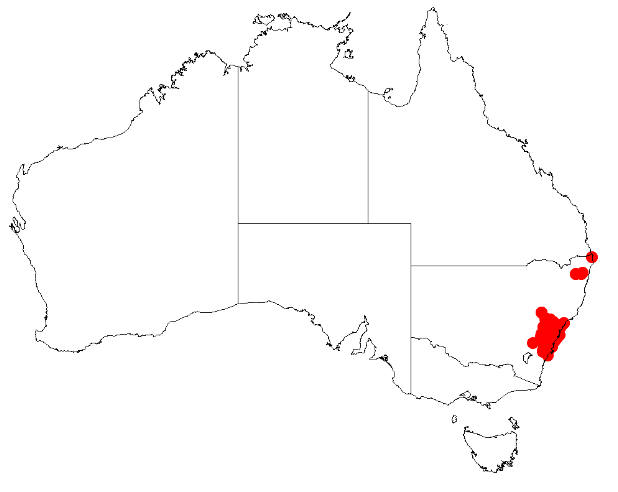
- Occurrence data from AVH

Synonyms
- Racosperma echinulum (DC.) Pedley

= Acacia echinula =

Hedgehog wattle

Species of legume

Acacia echinula, commonly known as hedgehog wattle, is a species of flowering plant in the family Fabaceae and is endemic to New South Wales. It is an intricate shrub with hairy branchlets, rather crowded phyllodes, spherical heads of mid-golden yellow flowers and curved, thinly leathery to crusty pods.

== Description ==
Acacia echinula is an intricate shrub that typically grows to a height of up to 2 m (7 ft), and has branchlets covered with fine hairs. Its phyllodes are rather crowded, more or less sessile terete phyllodes, 5–14 mm (0.20–0.55 in) long, 1.0–1.5 mm (0.039–0.059 in) wide, rigid and sharply pointed. The flowers are borne in a spherical head in axils on a peduncle 5–15 mm (0.20–0.59 in) long, the heads 5–10 mm (0.20–0.39 in) in diameter with 27 to 42 mid-golden yellow flowers. Flowering occurs from July to September, and the pods are up to 40 mm (1.6 in) long, 4–5 mm (0.16–0.20 in) wide and thinly leathery to crusty and blackish. The seeds are oblong, 4 mm (0.16 in) long and dark brown.

== Taxonomy ==
Acacia echinula was first formally described in 1825 by Augustin Pyramus de Candolle in his Prodromus Systematis Naturalis Regni Vegetabilis from specimens collected by Franz Sieber. The specific epithet (echinula) means 'having small prickles'.

== Distribution and habitat ==
Hedgehog wattle grows in sand over sandstone, in forest or heath, mainly between Nowra and Lake Macquarie with an outlier near Grafton in New South Wales.

== See also ==
- List of Acacia species
