= Sphingonaepiopsis asiatica =

Kopet hawkmoth

Scientific classification
- Domain: Eukaryota
- Kingdom: Animalia
- Phylum: Arthropoda
- Class: Insecta
- Order: Lepidoptera
- Family: Sphingidae
- Genus: Sphingonaepiopsis
- Species: S. asiatica

Binomial name
- Sphingonaepiopsis asiatica Melichar & Řezáč, 2013

Species of moth

Sphingonaepiopsis asiatica, the Kopet hawkmoth, is a moth of the family Sphingidae. The species was first described by Tomáš Melichar and Michal Řezáč in 2013. It is found in the Kopet-Dagh Mountains, along the border of northern Iran and southern Turkmenistan.

The wingspan is about 34 mm. Adults have been recorded on wing from mid-April to early June.
