= Sphingonaepiopsis gurkoi =

Gurkoi hawkmoth

Scientific classification
- Domain: Eukaryota
- Kingdom: Animalia
- Phylum: Arthropoda
- Class: Insecta
- Order: Lepidoptera
- Family: Sphingidae
- Genus: Sphingonaepiopsis
- Species: S. gurkoi

Binomial name
- Sphingonaepiopsis gurkoi Melichar & Řezáč, 2013

Species of moth

Sphingonaepiopsis gurkoi, the Gurkoi hawkmoth, is a moth of the family Sphingidae. The species was first described by Tomáš Melichar and Michal Řezáč in 2013. It is found in Tajikistan where it has been recorded at elevations above 3,500 meters in mountain steppe areas. It is possibly also found in Mongolia.

The wingspan is about 38 mm. Adults have been recorded on wing in July.
