= David Strauss =

German theologian and writer (1808–1874)

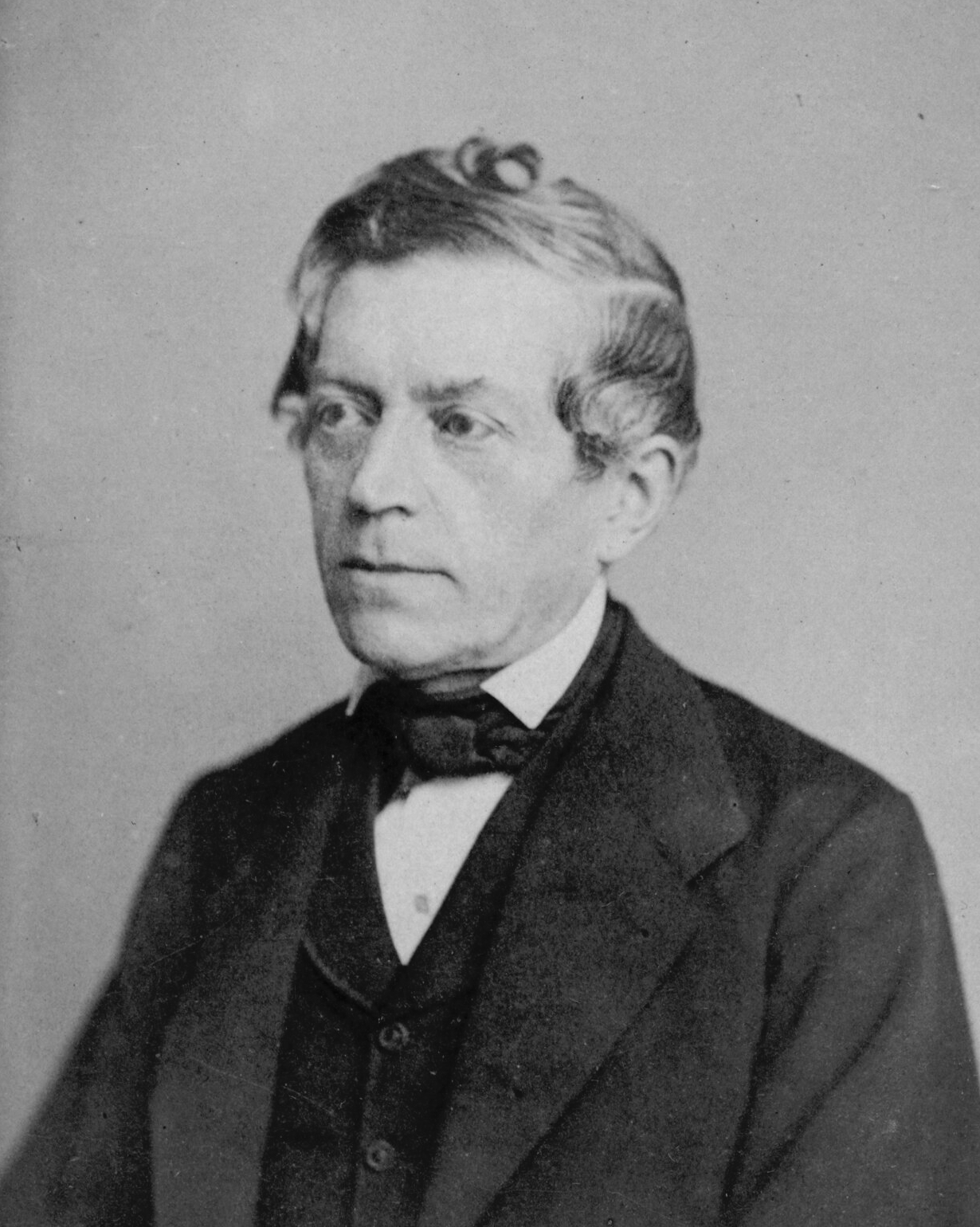
- Strauss, c. 1870
- Born: David Friedrich Strauss; 27 January 1808; Ludwigsburg, Kingdom of Württemberg
- Died: 8 February 1874 (aged 66); Ludwigsburg, German Empire
- Spouse: Agnese Schebest (m. 1842; div. 1847)

Education
- Education: Tübinger Stift; University of Tübingen
- Academic advisors: Ferdinand Christian Baur; Carl August von Eschenmayer; Friedrich Heinrich Kern; Karl Ludwig Michelet

Philosophical work
- Era: 19th-century philosophy
- Region: Western philosophy
- School: Young Hegelians
- Institutions: University of Tübingen; University of Zurich
- Main interests: Theology
- Notable ideas: Historical Jesus

David Friedrich Strauss (Note: /straʊs/; German: [ˈdaːvɪt ˈfʁiːdʁɪç ʃtʁaʊs]) (German: Strauß; 27 January 1808 – 8 February 1874) was a German liberal Protestant theologian and writer who influenced Christian Europe with his portrayal of the "historical Jesus", whose divine nature he explored via myth.

Strauss argued that many Gospel narratives are myths, where "myth" means not mere falsity but the imaginative expression of religious truth; however, he rejected orthodox supernatural claims about Jesus and did not simply affirm Jesus' divine nature in the traditional doctrinal sense.

His work was connected to the Tübingen School, which revolutionized study of the New Testament, early Christianity, and ancient religions. Strauss was a pioneer in the historical investigation of Jesus.

== Early life ==
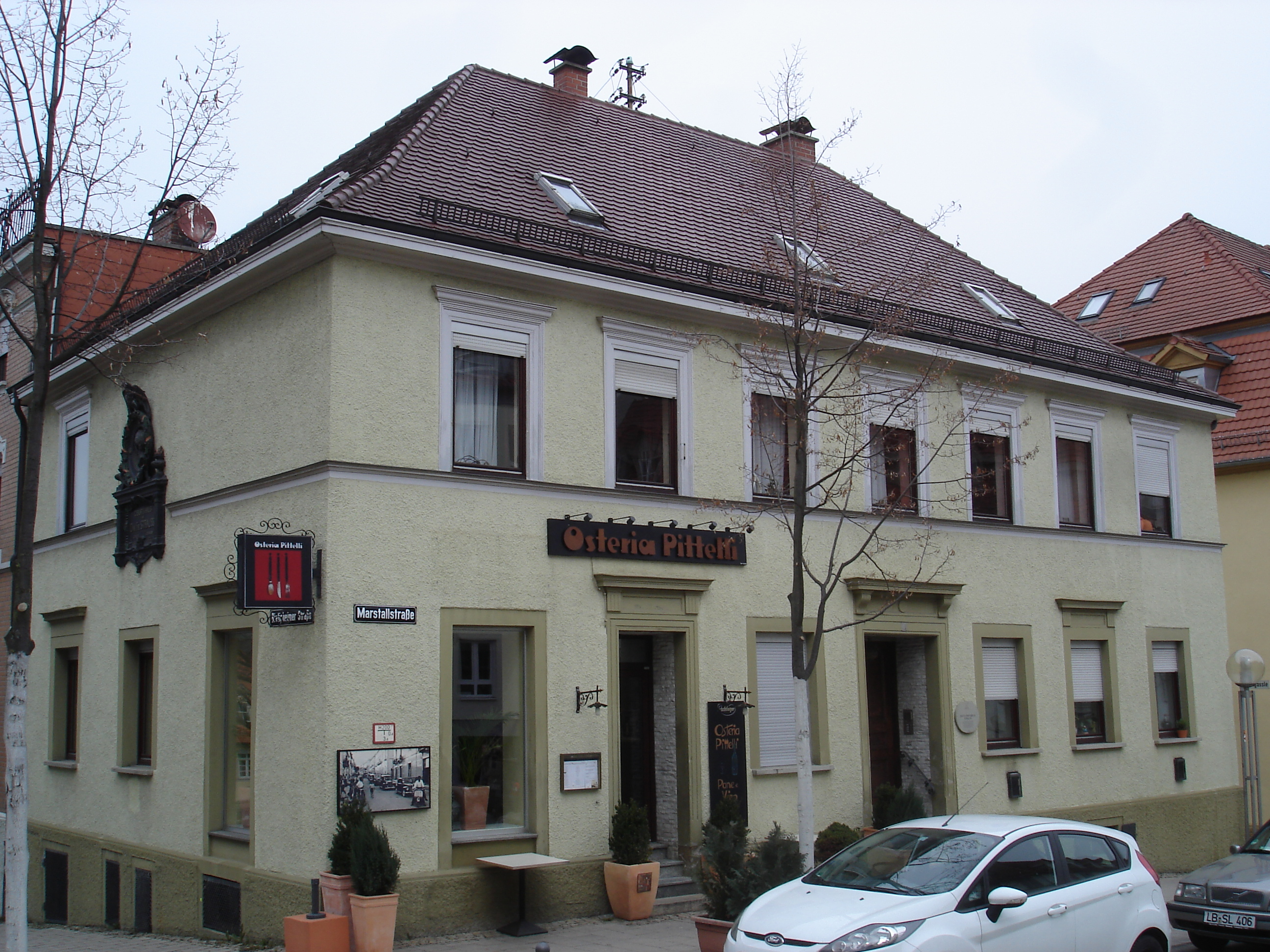
Strauss's birthplace in Ludwigsburg

He was born in Ludwigsburg, near Stuttgart. At age 12 he was sent to the evangelical seminary at Blaubeuren, near Ulm, to be prepared for the study of theology. Two of the principal masters in the school were Friedrich Heinrich Kern and Ferdinand Christian Baur, who instilled in their pupils a deep appreciation for the ancient classics and the principles of textual criticism, which could be applied to texts in the sacred tradition as well as to classical ones.

In 1825, Strauss entered the Tübinger Stift. The professors of philosophy there failed to interest him, but the theories of Friedrich Wilhelm Joseph Schelling, Jakob Böhme, Friedrich Schleiermacher and Georg Wilhelm Friedrich Hegel successively claimed his allegiance. In 1830, he became an assistant to a country clergyman, and nine months later, he accepted the post of professor in the Evangelical Seminaries of Maulbronn and Blaubeuren, where he would teach Latin, history and Hebrew.

In October 1831, Strauss resigned his office to study under Schleiermacher and Hegel in Berlin. Hegel died just as he arrived, and though Strauss regularly attended Schleiermacher's lectures, it was only those on the life of Jesus that interested him. Strauss tried to find kindred spirits among the followers of Hegel but was not successful. While under the influence of Hegel's distinction between Vorstellung and Begriff, Strauss had already conceived the ideas found in his two principal theological works: Das Leben Jesu (Life of Jesus) and Christliche Glaubenslehre (Christian Dogma). Hegelians generally would not accept his conclusions. In 1832, Strauss returned to Tübingen, lecturing on logic, Plato, the history of philosophy and ethics with great success. However, in the fall of 1833, he resigned, to devote all his time to the completion of his Das Leben Jesu, published when he was 27 years old. The full original title of this work is Das Leben Jesu kritisch bearbeitet (Tübingen: 1835–1836), and it was translated from the fourth German edition into English by George Eliot (Marian Evans) (1819–1880) and published under the title The Life of Jesus, Critically Examined (3 vols., London, 1846).

Since the Hegelians in general rejected his Life of Jesus, Strauss defended his work in a booklet, Streitschriften zur Verteidigung meiner Schrift über das Leben Jesu und zur Charakteristik der gegenwärtigen Theologie (Tübingen: E. F. Osiander, 1837), which was finally translated into English by Marilyn Chapin Massey and published under the title In Defense of My 'Life of Jesus' Against the Hegelians (Hamden, CT: Archon Books, 1983). The famous scholar Bruno Bauer led the attack of the Hegelians on Strauss, and Bauer continued to attack Strauss in academic journals for years. When young Friedrich Wilhelm Nietzsche began criticizing Strauss, Bauer gave Nietzsche every support that he could afford. In the third edition (1839) of Das Leben Jesu, and in Zwei friedliche Blätter (Two Peaceful Letters), Strauss made important concessions to his critics, some of which he withdrew, however, in the fourth edition (1840) of Das Leben Jesu.

== Das Leben Jesu ==
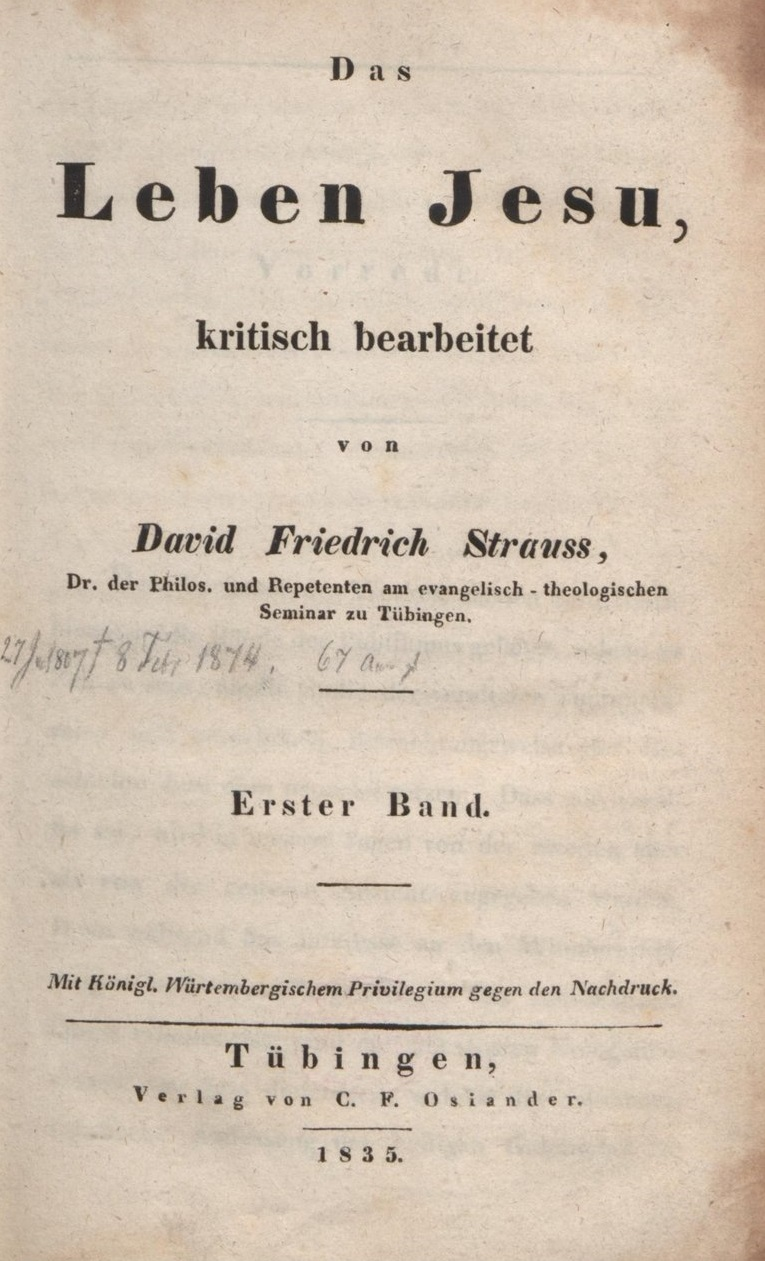
David Friedrich Strauss - Das Leben Jesu - book cover

Strauss's Das Leben Jesu, kritisch bearbeitet, 'The Life of Jesus, Critically Examined' was a sensation. While not denying that Jesus existed, Strauss did argue that the miracles in the New Testament were mythical additions with little basis in fact. Adolph Carl August von Eschenmayer wrote a review in 1835 called "The Iscariotism of our days", a review which Strauss characterised as "the offspring of the legitimate marriage between theological ignorance and religious intolerance, blessed by a sleep-walking philosophy." When Strauss was elected to a chair of theology in the University of Zurich, the appointment provoked such a storm of controversy that the authorities decided to pension him before he began his duties and effigies of Strauss were burnt during Zurich's Shrove Tuesday festival. Strauss donated the pension, 1000 Swiss Francs per year, to the poor.

What made Das Leben Jesu so controversial was Strauss's characterization of the miraculous elements in the gospels as mythical. After analyzing the Bible in terms of self-coherence and paying attention to numerous contradictions, he concluded that the miracle stories were not actual events. According to Strauss, the early church developed these stories in order to present Jesus as the Messiah of the Jewish prophecies. This perspective was in opposition to the prevailing views of Strauss' time: rationalism, which explained the miracles as misinterpretations of non-supernatural events, and the supernaturalist view that the biblical accounts were entirely accurate. Strauss's third way, in which the miracles are explained as myths developed by early Christians to support their evolving conception of Jesus, heralded a new epoch in the textual and historical treatment of the rise of Christianity.

In 1840 and the following year, Strauss published his On Christian Doctrine (Christliche Glaubenslehre) in two volumes. The main principle of this new work was that the history of Christian doctrines has basically been the history of their disintegration.

== Interlude (1841–1860) ==
With the publication of his Christliche Glaubenslehre, Strauss took leave of theology for over twenty years. On 30 August 1842, he married Agnese Schebest (1813–1870), a cultivated mezzo-soprano of high repute as an opera singer. The marriage soon became unhappy and, after the birth of two children, in 1847 the couple agreed terms of separation. Although it appears Strauss wished to marry other women in 1851 and 1867, his wife refused to grant him a final divorce.

Strauss resumed his literary activity with the 1847 publication in Mannheim of Der Romantiker auf dem Thron der Cäsaren ("A Romantic on the Throne of the Caesars"), in which he drew a satirical parallel between Julian the Apostate and Frederick William IV of Prussia. The ancient Roman Emperor who tried to reverse the advance of Christianity was presented as "an unworldly dreamer, a man who turned nostalgia for the ancients into a way of life and whose eyes were closed to the pressing needs of the present" – a thinly veiled reference to the contemporary Prussian King's well-known romantic dreams of restoring the supposed glories of feudal Medieval society.

In 1848 he was nominated a member of the Frankfurt Parliament, but was defeated by Christoph Hoffmann (1815–1885). He was elected for the Württemberg chamber, but his actions were so conservative that his constituents requested him to resign his seat. He forgot his political disappointments in the production of a series of biographical works, which secured him a permanent place in German literature (Schubarts Leben, 2 vols., 1849; Christian Märklin, 1851; Nikodemus Frischlin, 1855; Ulrich von Hutten, 3 vols., 1858–1860, 6th ed. 1895)

== Later works ==
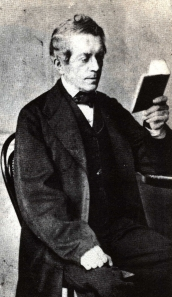
Strauss c. 1870

Strauss returned to theology in 1862, when he published a biography of H. S. Reimarus. Two years later in 1864, he published the Life of Jesus for the German People (Das Leben Jesu für das deutsche Volk bearbeitet) (13th ed., 1904). It failed to produce an effect comparable to that of the first Life, but it garnered numerous critical responses, which Strauss answered in his pamphlet Die Halben und die Ganzen (1865), directed specially against Daniel Schenkel (1813–1885) and Ernst Wilhelm Hengstenberg (1802–1869).

His The Christ of Faith and the Jesus of History (Der Christus des Glaubens und der Jesus der Geschichte) (1865) is a severe criticism of Schleiermacher's lectures on the life of Jesus, which were then first published. From 1865 to 1872 Strauss lived in Darmstadt, and in 1870 he published his lectures on Voltaire. His last work, Der alte und der neue Glaube translated as "On The Old and New Faith" (1872; English translation by M. Blind, 1873), produced almost as great a sensation as his Life of Jesus, and not least amongst Strauss's own friends, who wondered at his one-sided view of Christianity and his professed abandonment of spiritual philosophy for the materialism of modern science. Nietzsche harshly critiqued this work in his first of Untimely Mediations. Strauss added an Afterword as Foreword (Nachwort als Vorwort) to the Fourth edition of the book (1873). Soon thereafter, Strauss fell ill, and he died in Ludwigsburg on 8 February 1874.

== Critique ==
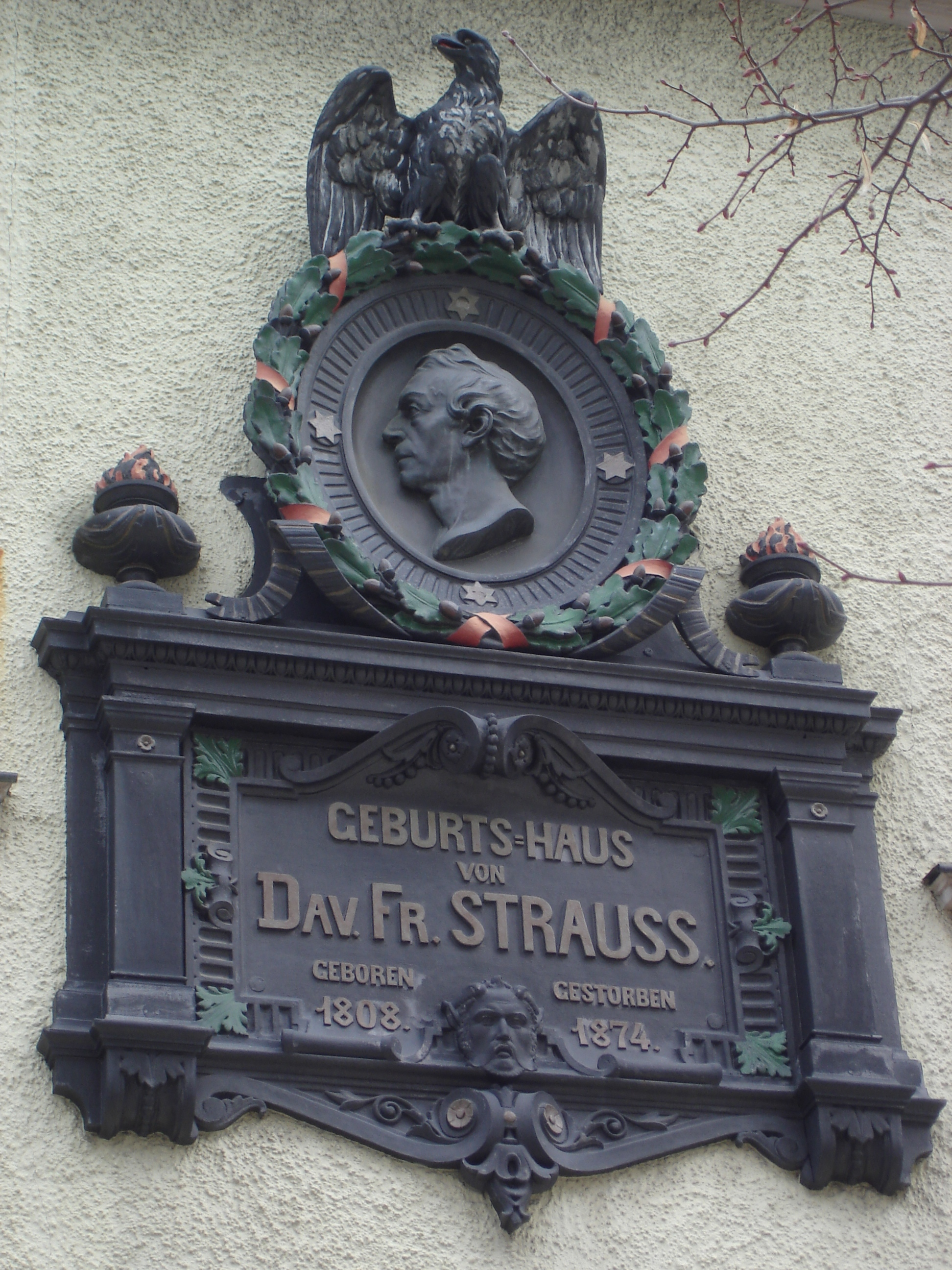
Memorial plaque for David Friedrich Strauß at his birthplace in Ludwigsburg

J. F. Smith, author of the article on Strauss in the ninth (1875-1889) edition of Encyclopædia Britannica, characterized Strauss's mind as almost exclusively analytical and critical, without depth of religious feeling or philosophical penetration, or historical sympathy; his work being accordingly rarely constructive. Smith found Strauss to strikingly illustrate Goethe's principle that loving sympathy is essential for productive criticism. Smith goes on to note that Strauss's Life of Jesus was directed against not only the traditional orthodox view of the Gospel narratives, but likewise the rationalistic treatment of them, whether after the manner of Reimarus or that of Heinrich Paulus.

His theory, that the Christ of the Gospels, excepting the most meagre outline of personal history, was the unintentional creation of the early Christian Messianic expectation, Strauss applied to the Gospel narratives. Smith felt Strauss's operations were based upon fatal defects, positive and negative, and that Strauss held a narrow theory as to the miraculous, a still narrower as to the relation of the divine to the human, and he had no true idea of the nature of historical tradition.

Smith notes that Ferdinand Christian Baur once complained that Strauss's critique of the history in the gospels was not based on a thorough examination of the manuscript traditions of the documents themselves. Smith claims that with a broader and deeper philosophy of religion, juster canons of historical criticism, with a more exact knowledge of the date and origin of the Gospels, Strauss's rigorous application of the mythical theory with its destructive results would have been impossible.

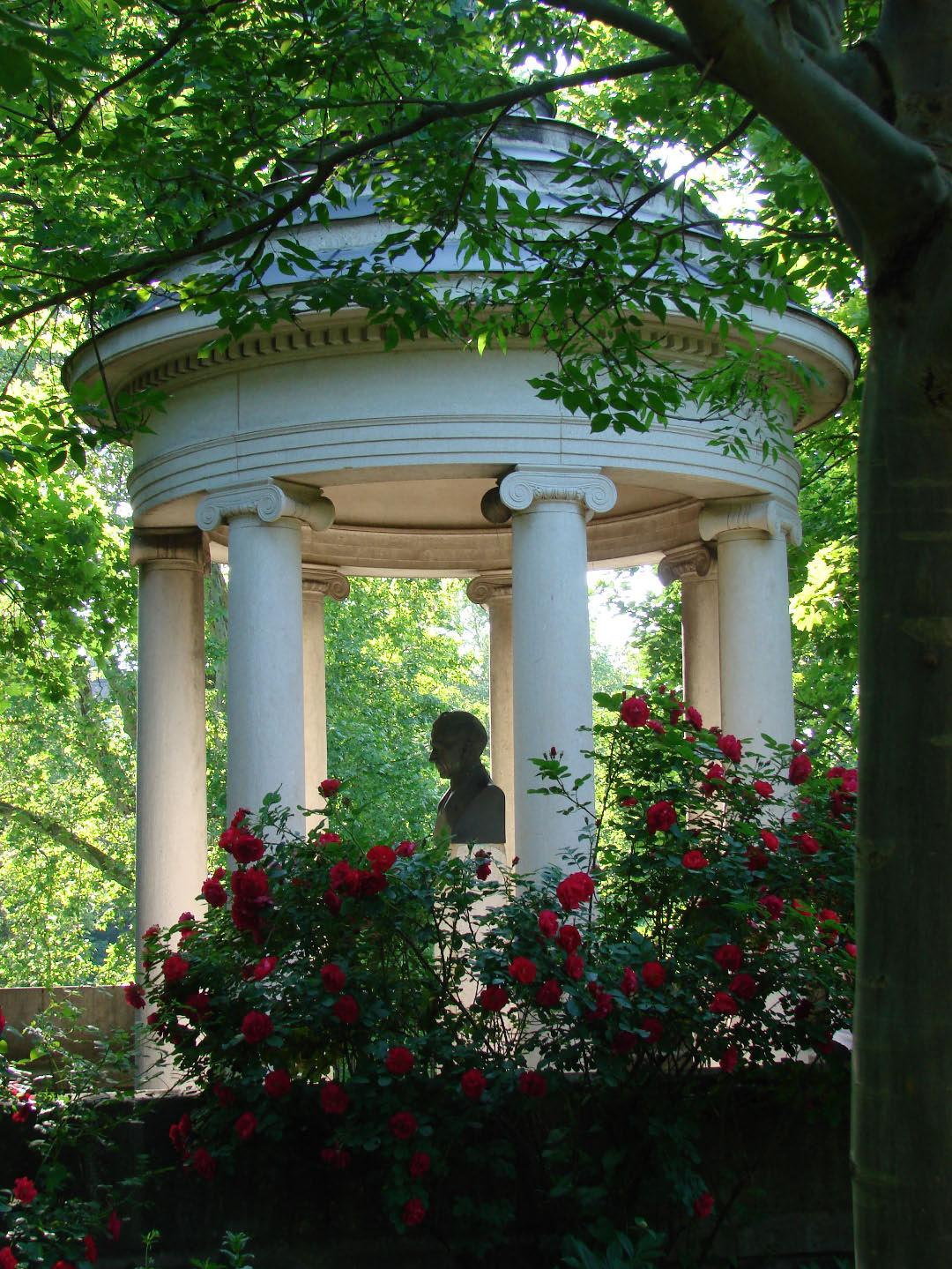
Monument for David Strauss in Ludwigsburg; it was erected in 1910 according to plans by Paul Bonatz, the bust is by Ludwig Habich.

Albert Schweitzer wrote in The Quest of the Historical Jesus (1906; 1910) that Strauss's arguments "filled in the death-certificates of a whole series of explanations which, at first sight, have all the air of being alive, but are not really so." He adds that there are two broad periods of academic research in the quest for the historical Jesus, namely, "the period before David Strauss and the period after David Strauss."

According to Peter C. Hodgson and James C. Livingston, David Strauss was the first one to raise the question about Jesus's historical character and open the way to separate Jesus from the Christian faith. In Strauss's "Life of Jesus", he disagreed with the previous ideas that historical Jesus can be easily reconstructed in conjunction with New Testament Manuscripts. Strauss pointed out that Christian tradition is fundamentally mythical, and that while he did not claim that there are no historical facts in the sources, there is too little evidence to reconstruct the historical image of Jesus to serve the Christian faith. Raising critical questions about Jesus's historical image made Strauss an important figure in the field of theology.

Marcus Borg has suggested that "the details of Strauss's argument, his use of Hegelian philosophy, and even his definition of myth, have not had a lasting impact. Yet his basic claims—that many of the gospel narratives are mythical in character, and that 'myth' is not simply to be equated with 'falsehood'—have become part of mainstream scholarship. What was wildly controversial in Strauss's time has now become one of the standard tools of biblical scholars."

One of the more controversial interpretations that Strauss introduced to the understanding of the historical Jesus, is his interpretation of Virgin Birth. In the Demythologization, Strauss's response was reminiscent of the German Rationalist movement in Protestant theology. According to Strauss, Jesus' Virgin Birth was added to the biography of Jesus as a legend in order to honor him in the way that Gentiles honored great historical figures. However, Strauss believed that the greater honor for Christ would have been to omit the Virgin Birth anecdote and to recognize Joseph as his legitimate father.

It has been claimed that Strauss's popularity was due as much to his clear and captivating style as to the logical force of his arguments.

== Works ==
All of Strauss's works—save Christliche Glaubenslehre—were published in a collected edition in 12 volumes by Eduard Zeller. Strauss's Ausgewählte Briefe appeared in 1895.
