= Daniel Schenkel =

Swiss Protestant theologian (1813-1885)

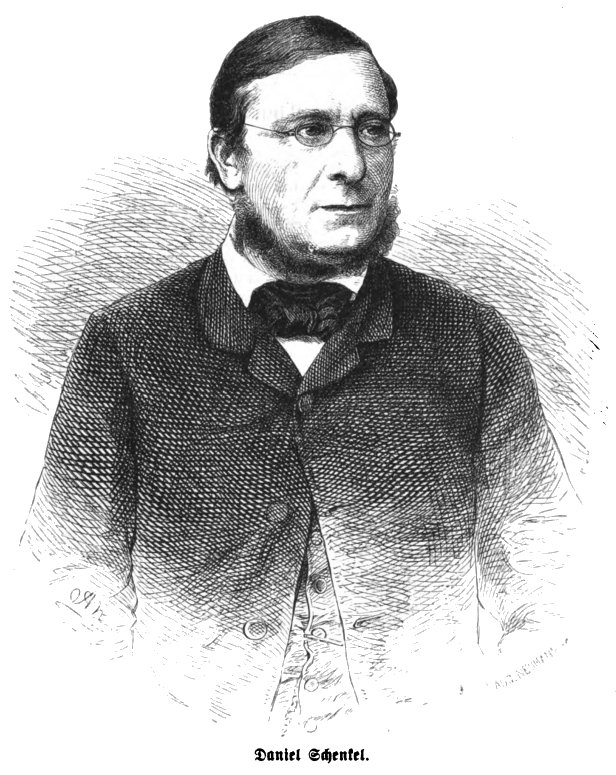
Daniel Schenkel

Georg Daniel Schenkel (21 December 1813 – 18 May 1885) was a Swiss Protestant theologian.

== Biography ==
Schenkel was born in Dägerlen in the canton of Zürich. After studying at Basel and Göttingen, he was successively pastor at Schaffhausen (1841), professor of theology at Basel (1849); and at Heidelberg professor of theology (1851), director of the seminary and university preacher. At first inclined to conservatism, he afterwards became an exponent of the mediating theology (German: Vermittlungstheologie), and ultimately a liberal theologian and advanced critic.

Associating himself with the "German Protestant Union" (German: Deutsche Protestanten-verein), he defended the community's claim to autonomy, the cause of universal suffrage in the church and the rights of the laity. From 1852 to 1859 he edited the Allgemeine Kirchenzeitung, and from 1861 to 1872 the Allgemeine Kirchliche Zeitschrift, which he had founded in 1859. In 1867, with a view to popularizing the researches and results of the Liberal school, he undertook the editorship of a Bibel-Lexicon (5 vols, 1869–1875), a work which was so much in advance of its time that it is still useful.

In his Das Wesen des Protestantismus aus den Quellen des Reformationszeitalters beleuchtet (3 vols. 1846–1851, 2nd ed. 1862), he declares that Protestantism is a principle which is always living and active, and not something which was realized once and for all in the past. He contends that the task of his age was to struggle against the Catholic principle which had infected Protestant theology and the church.

In his Christliche Dogmatik (2 vols, 1858–1859) he argues that the record of revelation is human and was historically conditioned: it can never be absolutely perfect; and that inspiration, though originating directly with God, is continued through human instrumentality. His Charakterbild Jesu (1864, 4th ed. 1873; Engl. trans. from 3rd ed., 1869), which appeared almost simultaneously with David Friedrich Strauss' Das Leben Jesu kritisch bearbeitet (Tübingen, 1835–1836), met with fierce opposition.

The work is considered too subjective and fanciful, the great fault of the author being that he lacks the impartiality of objective historical insight. Yet, as Pfleiderer says, the work "is full of a passionate enthusiasm for the character of Jesus." The author rejects all the miracles except those of healing, and these he explains psychologically. His main purpose was to modernize and reinterpret Christianity; he says in the preface to the third edition of the book: "I have written it solely in the service of evangelical truth, to win to the truth those especially who have been most unhappily alienated from the church and its interests, in a great measure through the fault of a reactionary party, blinded by hierarchical aims."

Schenkel died in Heidelberg.

== Writings ==
He also wrote:

- Friedrich Schleiermacher: ein Lebens- und Charakterbild (1868)
- Christentum und Kirche (2 vols., 1867–1872)
- Die Grundlehren des Christentums aus dem Bewusstsein des Glaubens dargestellt (1877)
- Das Christusbild der Apostel and der nachapostolischen Zeit (1879)
