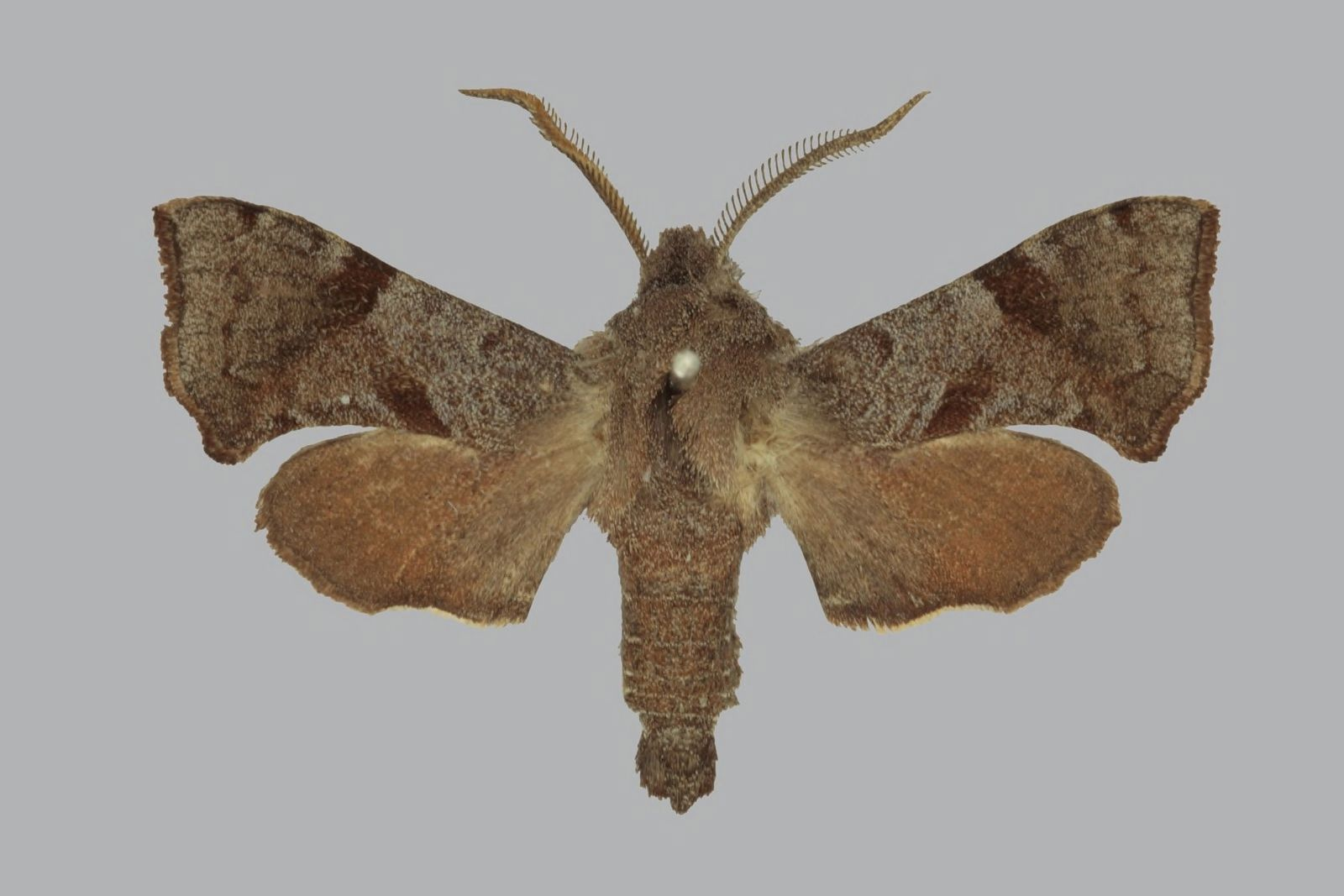

Scientific classification
- Domain: Eukaryota
- Kingdom: Animalia
- Phylum: Arthropoda
- Class: Insecta
- Order: Lepidoptera
- Family: Sphingidae
- Genus: Sphingonaepiopsis
- Species: S. obscurus

Binomial name
- Sphingonaepiopsis obscurus (Mabille, 1880)

Synonyms
- Pterogon obscurus Mabille, 1880

= Sphingonaepiopsis obscurus =

Species of moth

Sphingonaepiopsis obscurus is a moth of the family Sphingidae. It is known from Madagascar.
