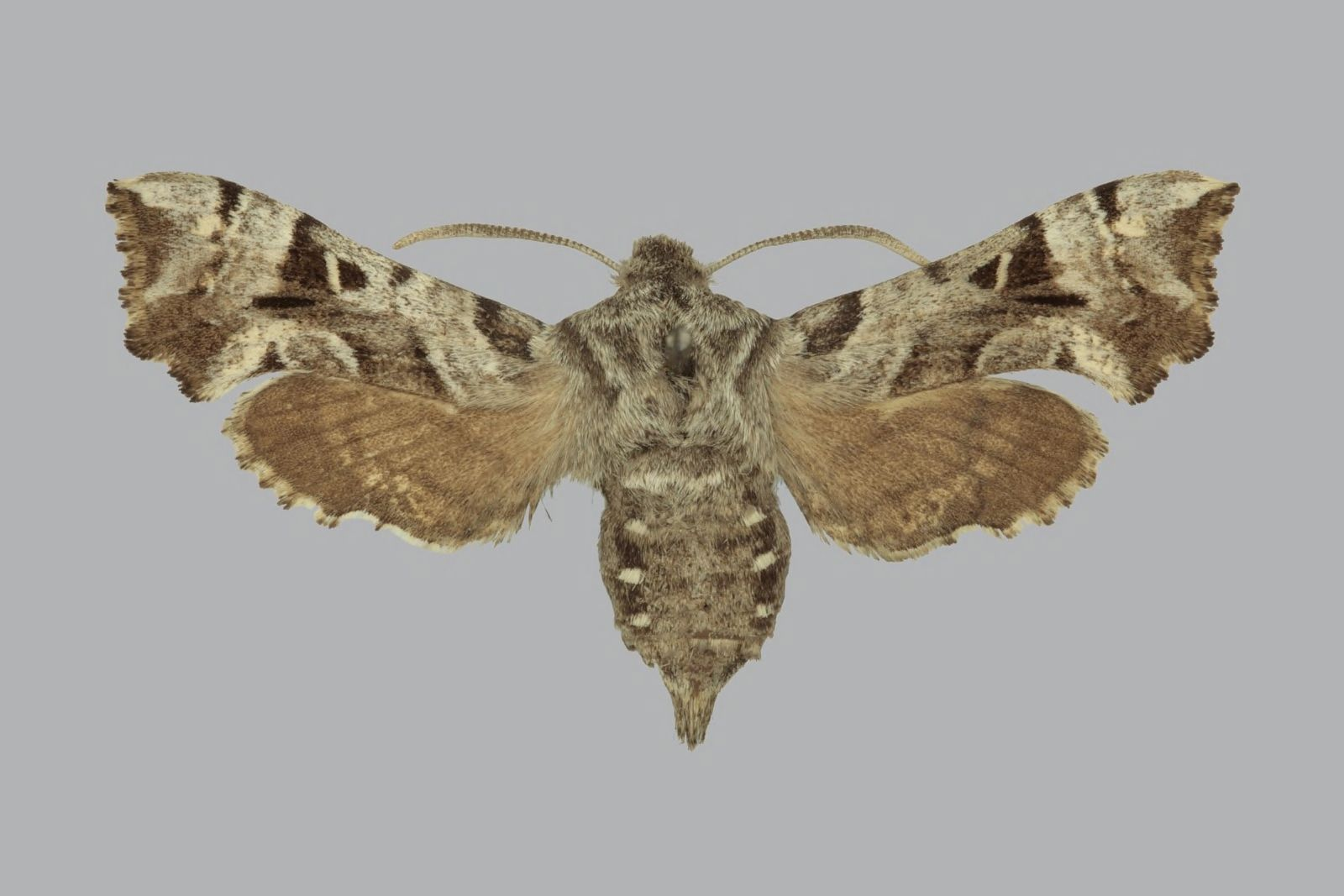

Scientific classification
- Domain: Eukaryota
- Kingdom: Animalia
- Phylum: Arthropoda
- Class: Insecta
- Order: Lepidoptera
- Family: Sphingidae
- Genus: Sphingonaepiopsis
- Species: S. gorgoniades

Binomial name
- Sphingonaepiopsis gorgoniades (Hübner, 1819)

Synonyms
- Sphinx gorgon Esper, [1803-1804]; Sphingonaepiopsis gorgon pfeifferi Zerny, 1933; Sphingonaepiopsis pfeifferi chloroptera Mentzer, 1974

= Sphingonaepiopsis gorgoniades =

Species of moth

Sphingonaepiopsis gorgoniades, the Gorgon hawkmoth, is a moth of the family Sphingidae. The species was first described by Jacob Hübner in 1819.

The wingspan is 25–32 mm. There are two generations per year with adults on wing in late May and early June and again in late July/August. In the southern Urals, adults have been recorded from late May to mid-July, with a partial second generation from late July to early August.

The larvae feed on Galium species, mainly Galium verum and other Rubiaceae species.
