= Kohautia grandiflora =

Scientific classification
- Kingdom: Plantae
- Clade: Tracheophytes
- Clade: Angiosperms
- Clade: Eudicots
- Clade: Asterids
- Order: Gentianales
- Family: Rubiaceae
- Genus: Kohautia
- Species: K. grandiflora

Binomial name
- Kohautia grandiflora DC.

Species of plant

Kohautia grandiflora is a species of plant in the family Rubiaceae. It is widespread in the West African savanna, and can be found in most of the coastal countries from Mauritania to Namibia, although its presence in Côte d'Ivoire and Mali is considered doubtful. It grows as far east as Uganda and Sudan. It is also found in Madagascar, Yemen and Oman. It has been introduced in United States (Texas, Florida), Mexico, Cuba, Central America, and northeastern South America. It is an annual and grows primarily in the seasonally dry tropical biome.

It is a common slender, erect ruderal herb growing to 30 cm high or more with small bright pink flowers. It grows especially in millet fields after the harvest in December.

In various Senegalese languages it is known as 'arey' (Banyun), 'ésâguté éden' (Djula), 'kolmâdin' (Mandinka), 'ndohum gor' (Serer), 'ndohum' (Wolof).

In the northern part of Nigeria, where it is known in Hausa as “Rimin samari” or “Rimin sauri”, it is used in several traditional medicinal preparations to treat gastric problems and inflammation.
