= Kohút =

Kohút (feminine: Kohútová) is a Slovak surname, meaning 'rooster'. The Czech counterpart is Kohout and the Polish counterpart is Kogut. Notable people with the surname include:

- Berta Berkovich Kohút (1921–2021), Slovak dressmaker and Holocaust survivor
- Emanuel Kohút (born 1982), Slovak volleyball player
- Michal Kohút (born 2000), Czech footballer

== See also ==
- Kohut
