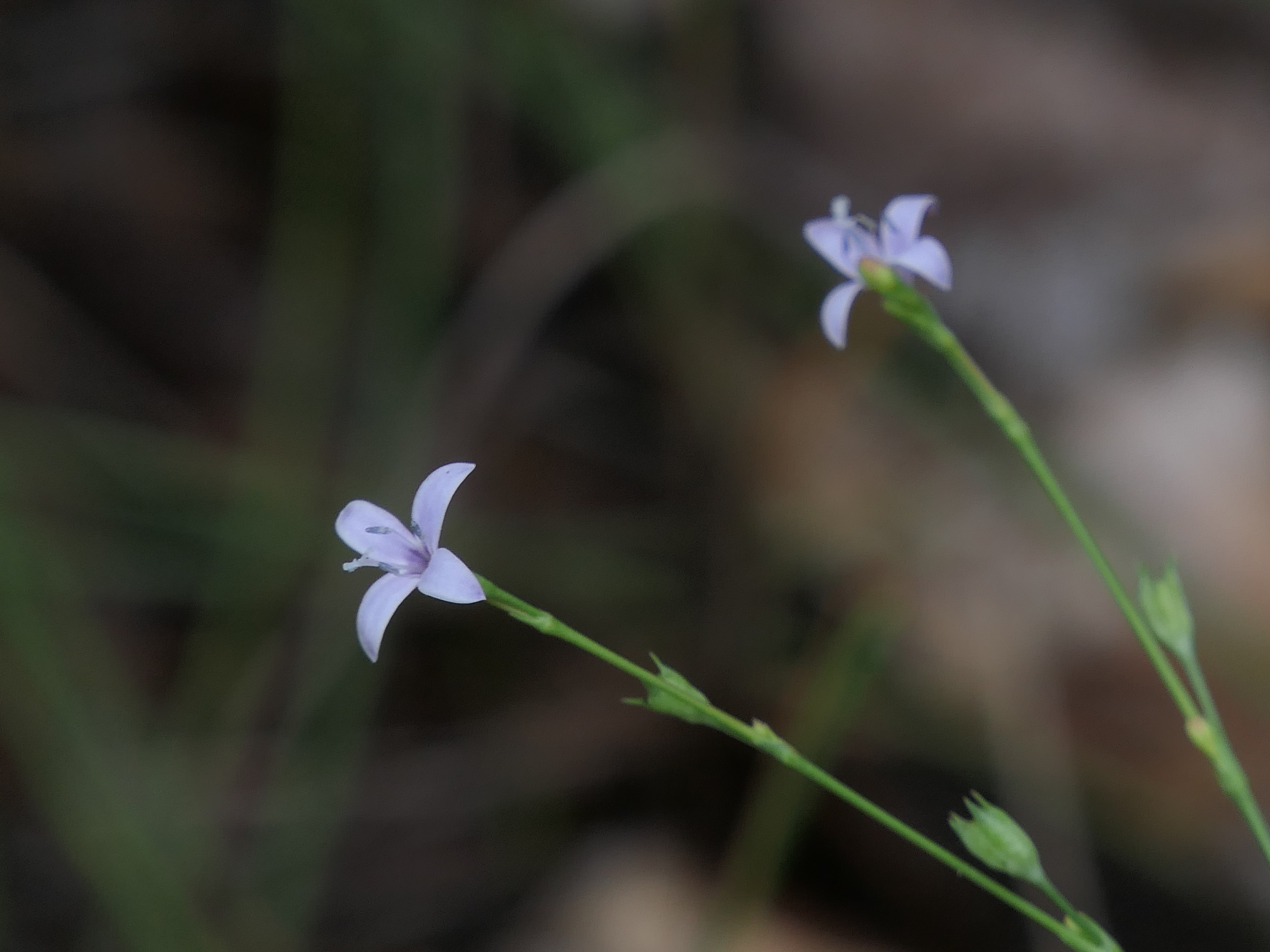
- Kohautia aspera

Scientific classification
- Kingdom: Plantae
- Clade: Tracheophytes
- Clade: Angiosperms
- Clade: Eudicots
- Clade: Asterids
- Order: Gentianales
- Family: Rubiaceae
- Genus: Kohautia; Chamisso & Schlechtendal (1829), nom. cons.

Type species
- Kohautia senegalensis Chamisso & Schlechtendal

Species
- See text

Synonyms
- Duvaucellia Bowdich (1825), nom. rej.

= Kohautia =

Genus of flowering plants

Kohautia is a genus of flowering plants in the family Rubiaceae. They are native to tropical areas of Asia, Africa, and Madagascar. Thirty-one species are known. The type species for the genus is Kohautia senegalensis.

Kohautia was named by Adelbert von Chamisso and Diederich von Schlechtendal in 1829. This generic name honors Franz Kohaut (d. 1822), a plant collector who worked in West Africa for the botanist Franz Sieber (1789-1844).

== Species ==
The following species are accepted in the genus Kohautia:

- Kohautia amatymbica Eckl. & Zeyh.
- Kohautia angolensis Bremek.
- Kohautia attenuata (Willd.) I.M.Turner
- Kohautia australiensis Halford
- Kohautia azurea (Dinter & K.Krause) Bremek.
- Kohautia caespitosa Schnizl.
- Kohautia coccinea Royle
- Kohautia confusa (Hutch. & Dalziel) Bremek.
- Kohautia cynanchica DC.
- Kohautia dolichostyla Bremek.
- Kohautia euryantha Bremek.
- Kohautia gracilis (Wall.) DC.
- Kohautia gracillima Bremek.
- Kohautia grandiflora DC.
- Kohautia huillensis Bremek.
- Kohautia kimuenzae (De Wild.) Bremek.
- Kohautia microflora D.Mantell
- Kohautia nagporensis (Brace ex Haines) Santapau & Merchant
- Kohautia pappii Bremek.
- Kohautia platyphylla (K.Schum.) Bremek.
- Kohautia pleiocaulis Bremek.
- Kohautia quartiniana (A.Rich.) Bremek.
- Kohautia ramosissima Bremek.
- Kohautia retrorsa (Boiss.) Bremek.
- Kohautia socotrana Bremek.
- Kohautia subverticillata (K.Schum.) Mantell
- Kohautia tenuis (Bowdich) Mabb.
