= Kohoutek =

Kohoutek (feminine: Kohoutková) is a Czech surname. It is a diminutive of the word kohout and the surname Kohout. Notable people with the surname include:

- Ctirad Kohoutek (1929–2011), Czech composer and music theorist
- Luboš Kohoutek (1935–2023), Czech astronomer

== See also ==
- Comet Kohoutek, a comet discovered by and named in honor of the astronomer
- 1850 Kohoutek, an asteroid named in honor of the astronomer
