= Carl August von Eschenmayer =

German philosopher

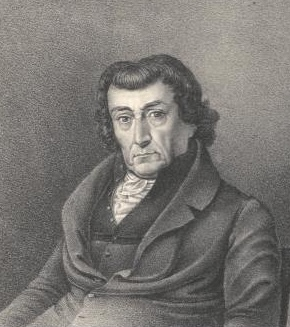
- Born: Adolph Carl August Eschenmayer; 4 July 1768; Neuenbürg, Duchy of Württemberg, Holy Roman Empire
- Died: 17 November 1852 (aged 84); Kirchheim unter Teck, Kingdom of Württemberg, German Confederation
- Other name: Adolph Carl August von Eschenmayer (from 1812)

Education
- Education: Karlsschule Stuttgart; University of Tübingen
- Academic advisor: Carl Friedrich Kielmeyer

Philosophical work
- Era: 19th-century philosophy
- Region: Western philosophy
- School: German idealism Naturphilosophie
- Institutions: University of Tübingen
- Notable students: David Strauss
- Main interests: Mysticism
- Notable ideas: Non-philosophy

Adolph Carl August von Eschenmayer (Note: There is no basis for the name "Adam" that was attributed to him in older scholarship.) (German: [ˈɛʃn̩ˌmaɪ̯ɐ]; 4 July 1768 – 17 November 1852) was a German philosopher and physician.

== Life ==
Eschenmayer was born in Neuenbürg in the Duchy of Württemberg in 1768. After receiving his early education at the Karlsschule Stuttgart, he entered the University of Tübingen, where he was given the degree of doctor of medicine. He practised for some time as a physician at Sulz, and then at Kirchheim, and in 1811 he was chosen extraordinary professor of philosophy and medicine at Tübingen. In 1818 he became ordinary professor of practical philosophy, but in 1836 he resigned and took up his residence at Kirchheim, where he devoted his whole attention to philosophical studies.

== Views ==
Eschenmayer's views are largely identical with those of Friedrich Wilhelm Joseph Schelling, but he differed from him in regard to the knowledge of the absolute. He believed that in order to complete the arc of truth, philosophy must be supplemented by what he called non-philosophy (German: Nichtphilosophie), a kind of mystical illumination by which was obtained a belief in God that could not be reached by mere intellectual effort. He carried this tendency to mysticism into his physical researches, and was led by it to take a deep interest in the phenomena of animal magnetism. He ultimately became a devout believer in demoniacal and spiritual possession; and his later writings are all strongly impregnated with supernaturalism.

== Works ==
- Die Philosophie in ihrem Übergange zur Nichtphilosophie (1803)
- Versuch die scheinbare Magie des thierischen Magnetismus aus physiol. und psychischen Gesetzen in erklären (1816)
- System der Moralphilosophie (1818)
- Psychologie in drei Theilen, als empirische, reine, angewandte (1817, 2nd ed. 1822)
- Religionsphilosophie (3 vols., 1818–1824)
- Die Hegelsche Religionsphilosophie verglichen mit dem christl. Princip (1834)
- Der Ischariotismus unserer Täge (1835) (directed against David Strauss's Life of Jesus)
- Konflikt zwischen Himmel und Hölle, an dem Damon eines besessenen Mädchens beobachtet (1837)
- Grundriss der Naturphilosophie (1832)
- Grundzüge der christl. Philosophie (1840)
- Betrachtungen über den physischen Weltbau (1852)
