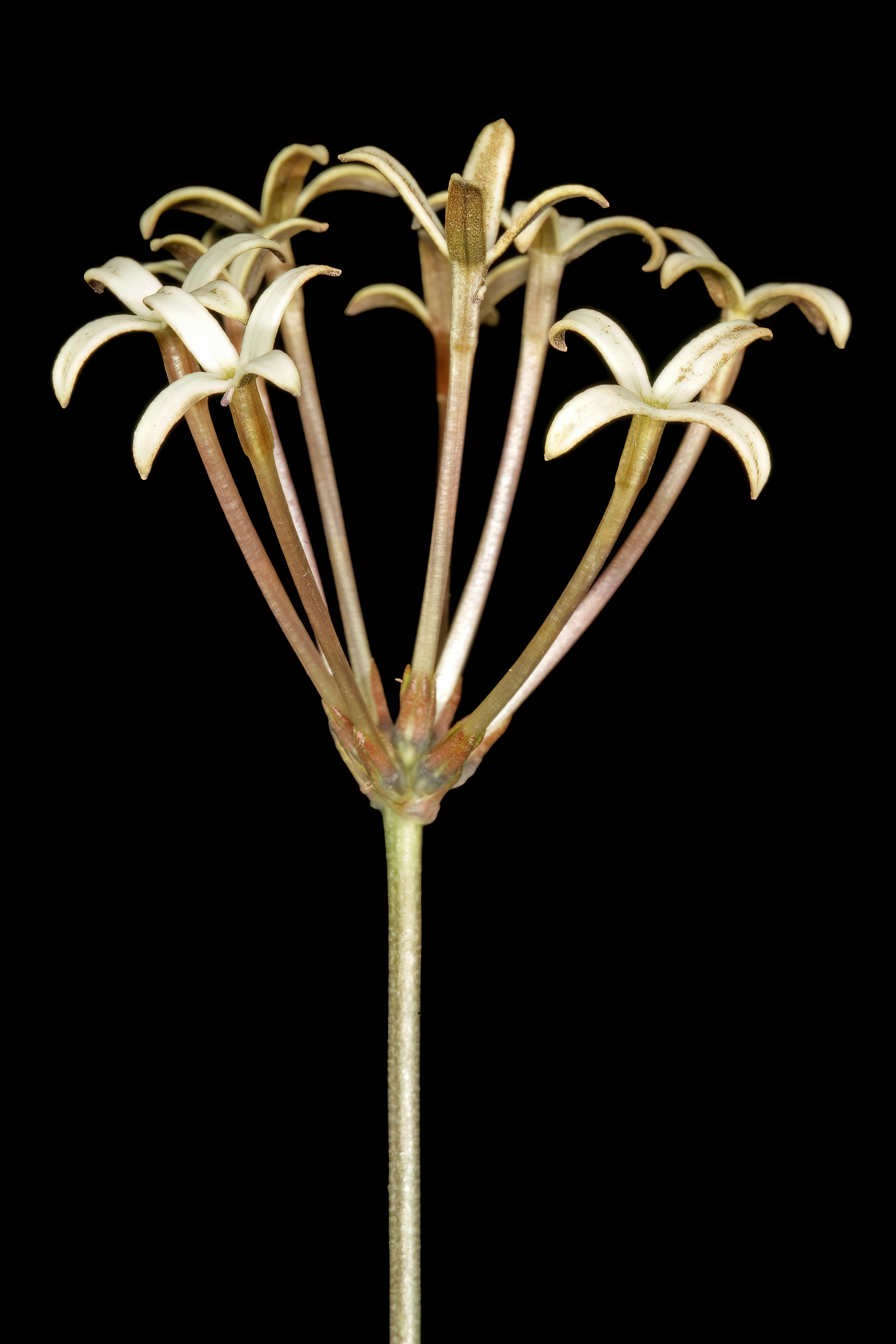

Scientific classification
- Kingdom: Plantae
- Clade: Embryophytes
- Clade: Tracheophytes
- Clade: Angiosperms
- Clade: Eudicots
- Clade: Asterids
- Order: Gentianales
- Family: Rubiaceae
- Genus: Kohautia
- Species: K. amatymbica

Binomial name
- Kohautia amatymbica Eckl. & Zeyh.

Synonyms
- Hedyotis amatymbica (Eckl. & Zeyh.) Steud.; Oldenlandia amatymbica (Eckl. & Zeyh.) Kuntze

= Kohautia amatymbica =

Species of flowering plant

Kohautia amatymbica, or tremble tops, is a species of flowering plant in the family Rubiaceae, native to southern Africa. Its roots are edible.
