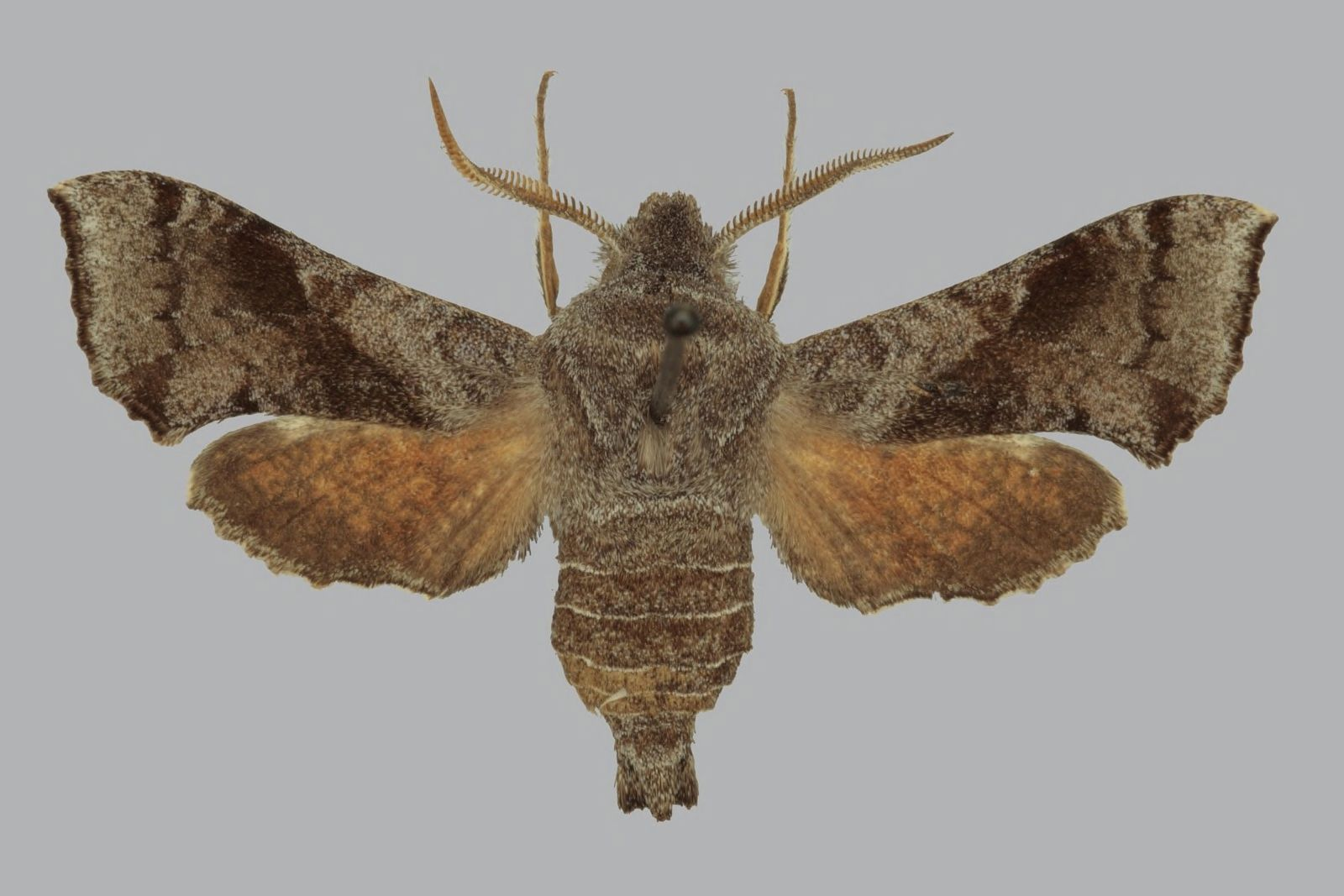

Scientific classification
- Kingdom: Animalia
- Phylum: Arthropoda
- Class: Insecta
- Order: Lepidoptera
- Family: Sphingidae
- Genus: Sphingonaepiopsis
- Species: S. ansorgei

Binomial name
- Sphingonaepiopsis ansorgei Rothschild, 1904

Synonyms
- Sphingonaepiopsis ansorgei featheri Clark, 1928

= Sphingonaepiopsis ansorgei =

Species of moth

Sphingonaepiopsis ansorgei is a moth of the family Sphingidae. It is known from open habitats from northern South Africa to East Africa in the east and to Angola in the west.

The length of the forewings is 14–15 mm.
