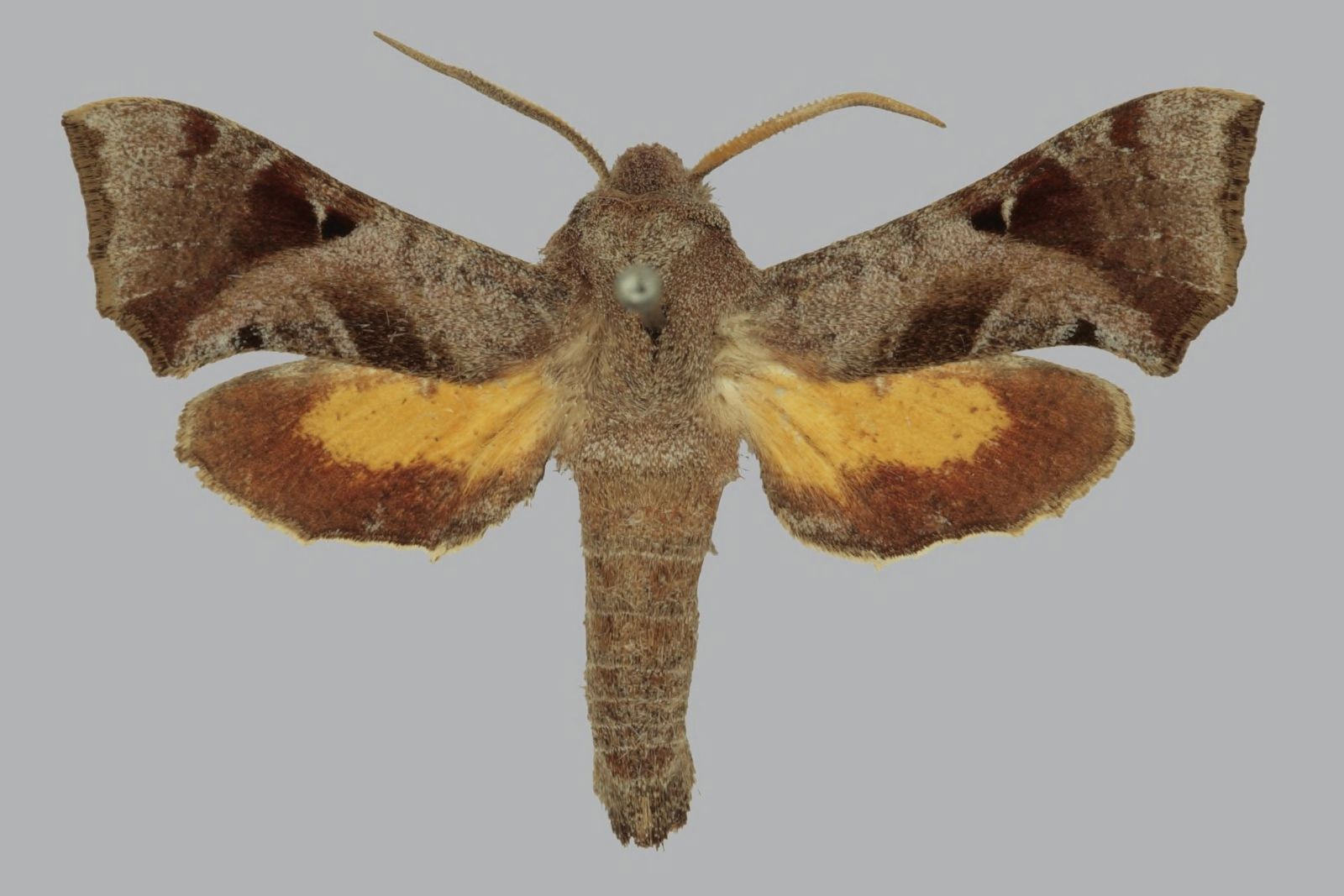

Scientific classification
- Domain: Eukaryota
- Kingdom: Animalia
- Phylum: Arthropoda
- Class: Insecta
- Order: Lepidoptera
- Family: Sphingidae
- Genus: Sphingonaepiopsis
- Species: S. pumilio

Binomial name
- Sphingonaepiopsis pumilio (Boisduval, [1875])

Synonyms
- Lophura pumilio Boisduval, [1875]

= Sphingonaepiopsis pumilio =

Species of moth

Sphingonaepiopsis pumilio, the tiny hawkmoth, is a species of moth of the family Sphingidae. It is found from Uttar Pradesh in India, east through Nepal, Bangladesh and Myanmar to China (as far north as Anhui), south to Peninsular Malaysia through Vietnam and Thailand.

The wingspan is 27–31 mm.

Larvae have been recorded on Galium gracile, Oldenlandia and Hedyotis uncinella.
