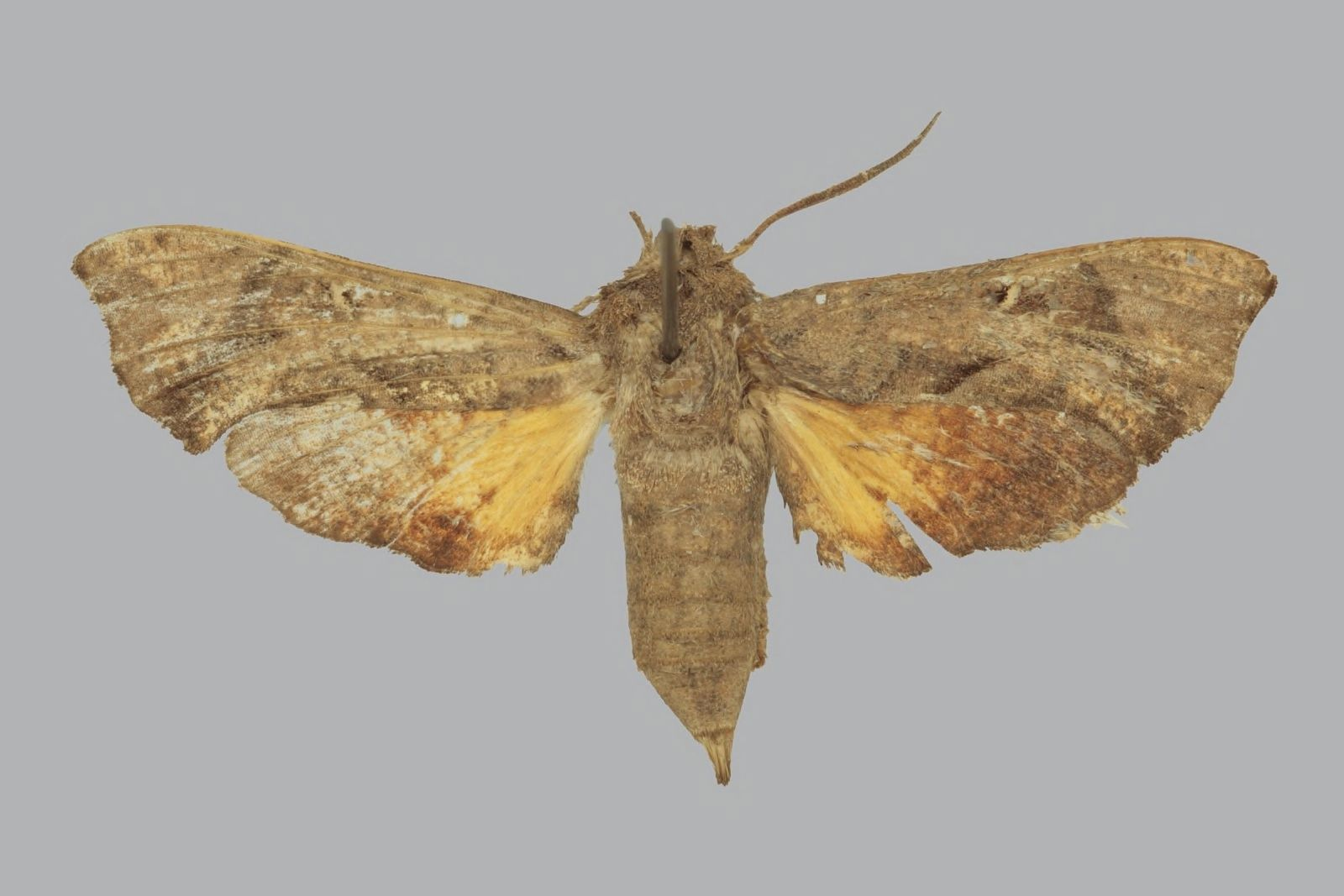

Scientific classification
- Domain: Eukaryota
- Kingdom: Animalia
- Phylum: Arthropoda
- Class: Insecta
- Order: Lepidoptera
- Family: Sphingidae
- Genus: Sphingonaepiopsis
- Species: S. malgassica

Binomial name
- Sphingonaepiopsis malgassica Clark, 1929

Synonyms
- Sphingonaepiopsis wellsi Griveaud, 1959

= Sphingonaepiopsis malgassica =

Species of moth

Sphingonaepiopsis malgassica is a moth, that is part of the family Sphingidae. It is known to be from Madagascar.
