= Anna Sick =

German composer and pianist

Anna (or Anne) Laura Mahir Sick (10 July 1803 – 19 February 1895) (Note: The date may be inaccurate as from an 1897 book, a short biography was given where she was marked alive, however it mentions Ferdinand Sieber whose name is 3 below, it says that Sieber died at the exact same place and time as what is written in this article here. While it is still possible, it is highly unlikely, thus the reference for her date of death may have made the mistake of confusing the two.) was a German composer and pianist who served as the court pianist and Mistress of Piano to the court in Stuttgart.

Sick was born in Munich. She studied in Salzburg with Maria Anna Mozart, Wolfgang Amadeus Mozart's older sister. Her first performance was in Vienna in 1825, which was successful. She then studied under Carl Czerny, Josef Foerster, and Johann Aloys Miksch. In 1827, she toured across Germany, particularly in Augsburg, Munich, and Frankfurt. After 1827, she became a court pianist in Stuttgart, where she met and married the court assessor, M. Sick, in 1834. She also became a teacher. From then on, she stopped giving public performances, however she still performed privately. She was considered an excellent performer of Mozart, and on 1 October 1871, the Monthly Musical Record said that she was the “only distinguished player in Munich.” She died in Berlin.

== Piano ==
- Pastoral
- Three Variations
- Pianoforte Pieces

== Vocal ==
- songs/lieder
