= Kohautia socotrana =

Conservation status
- Data Deficient (IUCN 3.1)

Scientific classification
- Kingdom: Plantae
- Clade: Embryophytes
- Clade: Tracheophytes
- Clade: Spermatophytes
- Clade: Angiosperms
- Clade: Eudicots
- Clade: Asterids
- Order: Gentianales
- Family: Rubiaceae
- Genus: Kohautia
- Species: K. socotrana

Binomial name
- Kohautia socotrana Bremek. (1952)

Species of plant

Kohautia socotrana is a species of plant in the family Rubiaceae. It is a subshrub endemic to Socotra island of Yemen, off the coast of Africa. It is widespread in lower-elevation shrublands and woodlands, including windswept grassland and shrubland on coastal plains and limestone plateaus, deciduous woodland in wadis, and semi-deciduous woodland on limestone plateaus, from sea level to 600 metres elevation.
