= Kohout =

Kohout (feminine: Kohoutová) is a Czech surname, meaning 'rooster'. The Polish counterpart is Kogut and the Slovak counterpart is Kohút. Notable people with the surname include:

- Aleš Kohout (born 1972), Czech footballer
- Antonín Kohout (1919–2013), Czech cellist
- Eduard Kohout (1889–1976), Czech actor
- František Kohout (died 1822), Czech botanical collector and gardener
- Jan Kohout (born 1961), Czech diplomat and politician
- Josef Kohout, known under his pen name Heinz Heger (1917–1994), Austrian Nazi concentration camp survivor
- Michal Kohout (born 1996), Czech cyclist
- Milan Kohout (born 1955), Czech-American artist and writer
- Pavel Kohout (born 1928), Czech-Austrian novelist, playwright and poet
- Pavel Kohout (organist) (born 1976), Czech organist
- Slavka Kohout (1932–2024), American figure skating coach
- Zdeněk Kohout (born 1967), Czech bobsledder

== See also ==
- Kohoutek
- Kohut
- Marta Pavlisová, married Marta Kohoutová (1914–1953), Czech sprint canoer
