= Kogut =

Kogut is a Polish surname, meaning 'rooster'. The Czech counterpart is Kohout and the Slovak counterpart is Kohút. Notable people with the surname include:

- Adam Kogut (1895–1940), Polish footballer
- Bruce Kogut (born 1953), American organizational theorist
- John Kogut (born 1945), American theoretical physicist
- Oded Kogut (born 2001), Israeli road cyclist
- Sandra Kogut (born 1965), Brazilian filmmaker
- Stanisław Kogut (1953–2020), Polish politician
- Volodymyr Kogut (born 1984), Ukrainian track cyclist

== See also ==
- Kohut
