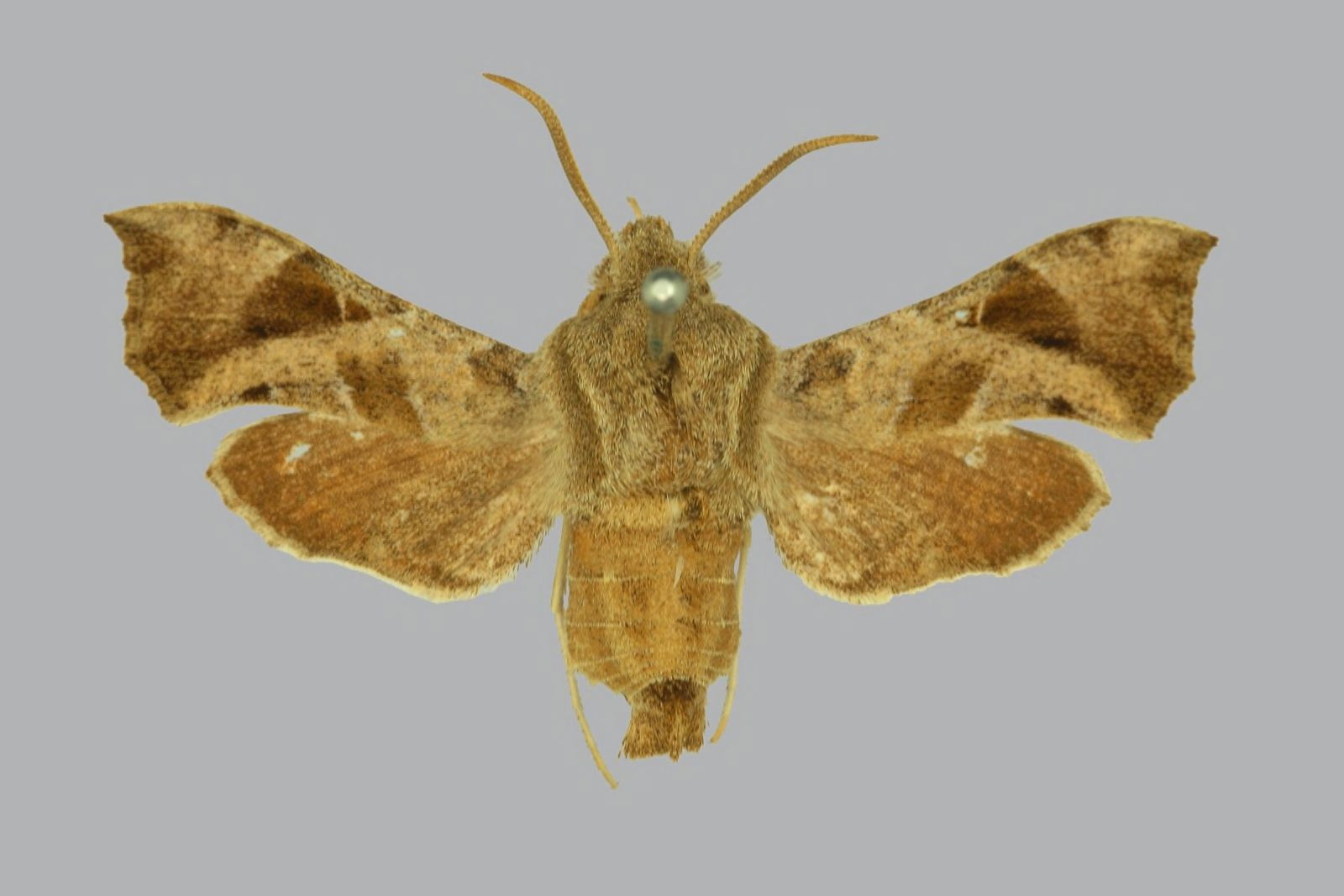
- Sphingonaepiopsis nana

Scientific classification
- Kingdom: Animalia
- Phylum: Arthropoda
- Class: Insecta
- Order: Lepidoptera
- Family: Sphingidae
- Tribe: Macroglossini
- Genus: Sphingonaepiopsis; Wallengren, 1858

Species
- See text

= Sphingonaepiopsis =

Genus of moths

Sphingonaepiopsis is a genus of moths in the family Sphingidae.

== Species ==
- Sphingonaepiopsis asiatica Melichar & Řezáč, 2013
- Sphingonaepiopsis ansorgei (Rothschild, 1904)
- Sphingonaepiopsis gorgoniades (Hübner, 1819)
- Sphingonaepiopsis gurkoi Melichar & Řezáč, 2013
- Sphingonaepiopsis kuldjaensis (Graeser, 1892)
- Sphingonaepiopsis malgassica (Clark, 1929)
- Sphingonaepiopsis nana (Walker, 1856)
- Sphingonaepiopsis obscurus (Mabille, 1880)
- Sphingonaepiopsis pumilio (Boisduval, [1875])
