= Oswald Kohut =

German journalist and publisher

Oswald Kohut (9 August 1877 – 25 October 1951) was a German journalist, publisher and writer with two pseudonyms, Franz Conring and Dr. Otto Hollmann.

== Life ==
Born in Düsseldorf, Kohut was born as the son of Adolph Kohut and his wife Elisabeth Kohut-Mannstein. He studied Literary criticism and Art history at the universities of Rostock, Bonn and Berlin. After his studies he was editor of the Potsdamer Intelligenz-Blatt in 1897, official publication organ of the authorities for Potsdam and the surrounding districts", then at the Berliner Lokalanzeiger and at the Berliner Tageblatt. From 1899 to 1921 he was editor-in-chief and owner of the newspaper Grunewald-Echo From 1904 to 1918 he was editor of the newspaper Die Höfische und herrschaftliche Küche. Zeitschrift für die Interessen hoher und höchster Herrschaften sowie deren Beamte und Angestellte in allen technische und administrativen Angelegenheiten der Küche and from 1918 until 1921 of Die herrschaftliche Küche. Culinary leaves. Magazine for all areas of distinguished hospitality. In Berlin he became a member of the Victoria masonic lodge.

The Reichsschriftleitergesetz (Reich's written director law) of 4 October 1933 determined in its § 5 Editor-in-Chief can only be: paragraph 3 "of Aryan descent and is not married to a person of non-Aryan descent". Thus he was banned from the profession. In 1936 the company was forcibly deleted. In 1943, in the last address book before the end of the war, he lived in Berlin Schöneberg, Grunewaldstraße 55.

Sein Sohn war the politician Oswald Adolph Kohut.

Kohut died in Berlin at age 74.

== Work ==
- Edit.: Adreßbuch der westlichen Berliner Vororte. Grunewald, Halensee-Wilmersdorf, Schmargendorf, Dahlem, Schlachtensee, Nikolassee, Wannsee und Grunewald-Forst. 2 volumes. Grunewald-Echo, Grunewald 1904–1905.
- Franz Conring: Das deutsche Militär in der Karikatur. Mit 480 Textillustrationen und 72 Beilagen nach seltenen und amüsanten Karikaturen aller Länder und Zeiten. Hermann Schmidts Verlag, Stuttgart 1907. archive.org
- Ein Jahrhundert deutsches Dichten und Denken. 4 volumes. 1921.
- Grunewald-Echo. Jubiläums-Nummer 1899 – 1924. Grunewald-Echo, Berlin-Grunewald 1924.
- Buchhändlers Mußestunden. Enk-Verlag, Berlin-Tempelhof 1924.
- 30 Jahre Grunewald-Echo. Jubiläums-Nummer [Jubiläums-Festschrift zum 30-jährigen Bestehen. December 1899 – December 1929]. Kende, Berlin-Grunewald 1929.
