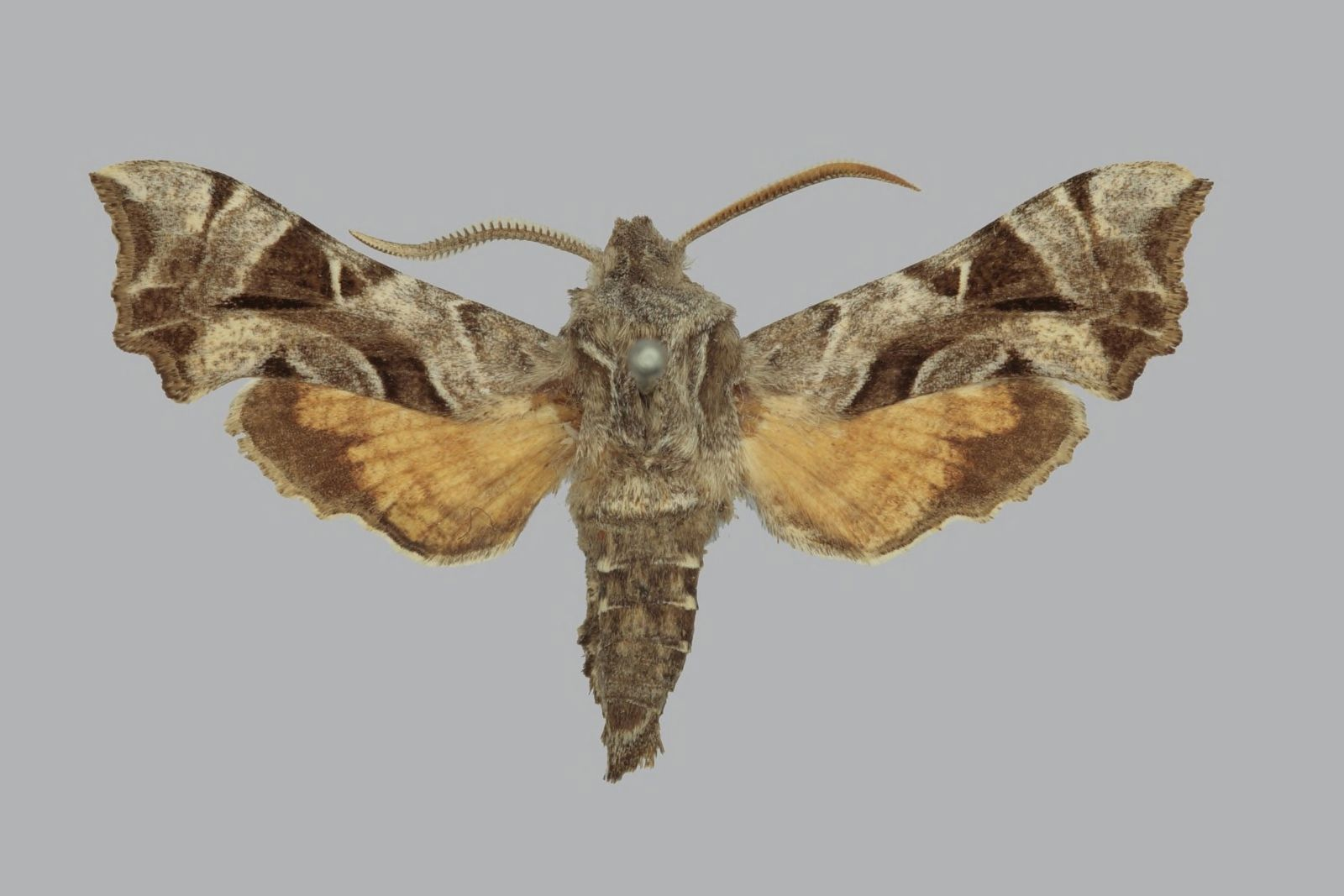

Scientific classification
- Domain: Eukaryota
- Kingdom: Animalia
- Phylum: Arthropoda
- Class: Insecta
- Order: Lepidoptera
- Family: Sphingidae
- Genus: Sphingonaepiopsis
- Species: S. kuldjaensis

Binomial name
- Sphingonaepiopsis kuldjaensis (Graeser, 1892)

Synonyms
- Pterogon kuldjaensis Graeser, 1892

= Sphingonaepiopsis kuldjaensis =

Kuldja hawkmoth

Species of moth

Sphingonaepiopsis kuldjaensis, the Kuldja hawkmoth, is a moth of the family Sphingidae. The species was first described by Ludwig Carl Friedrich Graeser in 1892. It is found in eastern Kazakhstan, western Xinjiang province in China, eastern Uzbekistan, Tajikistan, Kyrgyzstan and eastern Afghanistan.

The wingspan is 30–34 mm. There are two generations per year with adults on wing from late April to early July, and again as a partial second generation from early July to late August.

The larvae feed on flower buds and young leaves of Galium species.
