= Johann Gottfried Bergmann =

German operatic tenor (1795–1831)

Johann Gottfried Bergmann (10 May 1795 – 4 July 1831) was a royal Saxon court actor and operatic tenor.

== Life ==
Born in Reichenbach near Königsbrück as a child of poor parents and unable to practise a trade due to an accident in his childhood, Bergmann had to contribute to his own livelihood early on. However, he attended school and was promoted by his father, who was a violinist, in the field of music. After hearing a polyphonic choir at a fair for the first time, he prepared himself as well as possible privately to be accepted into the Dresden Singchor. His father, however, believed that he could only finance an education at a teacher's seminar, but Bergmann was able to take an entrance examination at the Kreuzschule with the intercession of the local priest, with whom he had had Latin lessons. In the six school years that he spent there, he suffered material hardship and went through several serious illnesses. Out of poverty he finally decided to become a schoolmaster and learned to play the organ for this purpose. On 15 October 1814 he was appointed cantor in Senftenberg. In September 1816 he got an engagement at the Royal Saxon Court Theatre in Dresden thanks to his beautiful tenor voice; the singer Miksch and the actor Joseph Anton Christ trained him further in their subjects. Court actor Christ also became Bergmann's father-in-law on 23 October 1821; Demoiselle Henriette Christ also belonged to the court theatre.

Bergmann's preferred roles included Pylades in Iphigénie en Tauride, Florestan in Fidelio and Don Ottavio in Don Giovanni. His melting tenor voice was praised in a summary of his life in the New Necrology of the Germans, although it was more suited to the performance of songs than to the singing of bravura arias. Although his appearance had "not been advantageous for the stage", "his high slender figure, his decency and other good posture" had ensured that it had at least "not been disturbing".

Bergmann died in Dresden at the age of 36.
