= Elisabeth Kohut-Mannstein =

German operatic soprano

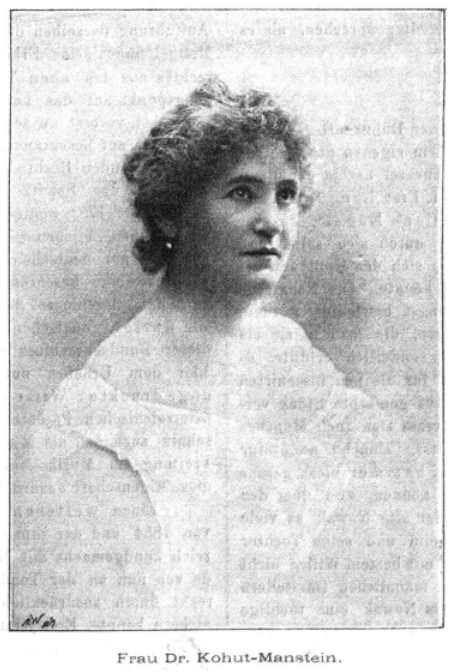

Elisabeth Kohut-Mannstein, also Elisabeth Kohut-Manstein, real name Elisabeth Steinmann (3 May 1843 – 29 November 1926) was a German operatic soprano and voice teacher.

== Life ==
Steinmann was born in Dresden and had a sister named Grete. She was trained by her father, the singing teacher Heinrich Ferdinand Mannstein, who was known under the pseudonym Heinrich Ferdinand Mannstein. She adopted the stage name Elisabeth Mannstein. From 1877 She was married to the writer Adolph Kohut. She died on 29 November 1926 in Berlin-Grunewald and was buried at Grunewald Cemetery.

In her career as a singer she appeared at the court opera of St. Petersburg, at the Stadttheater Düsseldorf and at the Krolloper in Berlin. In 1870 she appeared at the German Theater in Amsterdam and in Wiesbaden as guest singer. Her performances as Donna Anna in Don Giovanni, as Leonore in Fidelio, in the title role in Euryanthe by Weber and as Frau Fluth in The Merry Wives of Windsor by Otto Nicolai were famous. In 1872 she was engaged at the Theater Aachen. After finishing her active stage career she worked as a singing teacher in Berlin.

Miss Mannstein is beautiful, enchantingly beautiful, even outside the stage, she is reminiscent of Heine's poem: The Woman's Body is a poem written by God the Lord.

— Die Deutsche Schaubühne. Organ für Theater, Musik, Kunst, Literatur und sociales Leben. 1868, p. 68.

She had one son, Oswald Kohut (1877–1951). The politician Oswald Adolph Kohut was one of her grandchildren.

== Work ==
- Die große altitalienische Gesangsschule. Introduction by Ludwig Richard Bernscht. Energetos-Ritte-Verlag, Berlin 1922. Table of contents

== Theatre seat ==
- Premiere: Wiesbaden, 23 March 1870. Mozart: Don Giovanni. Große Oper in 2 Akten. Nach dem Italienischen frei bearbeitet. Interprets: Hermann Philippi: Don Juan. David Klein: Gouverneur Don Petro. Elisabeth Mannstein: Donna Anna. Elisabeth Řebíček-Löffler: Donna Elvira. Bodo Borchers: Don Octavio. F. Lipp: Don Juan's servant Leporello. Franz Fischer: a farm boy Masetto. Ella Guilleaume: his bride Zerline. Printer: Rudolph Bechthold. "Miss Mannstein from the German Theatre in Amsterdam as guest"
- Premiere: Wiesbaden, 30 March 1870. Donizetti: Lucrezia Borgia. Große Oper in 3 Akten. Interprets: Hermann Philippi: Duke of Ferrara Don Alfonso. Elisabeth Mannstein: his wife Lucrezia Borgia. Bodo Borchers: young nobleman in the retinue of the Venetian envoy in Ferrara Gennaro. Hermine Otto: young nobleman in the retinue of the Venetian envoy in Ferrara Orsino. Carl Stengel: young nobleman in the retinue of the Venetian envoy in Ferrara Liveretto. Otto Dornewaß: young nobleman in the retinue of the Venetian envoy in Ferrara Gazella. Franz Fischer: young nobleman in the retinue of the Venetian envoy in Ferrara Petrucci. R. Kuhl: young nobleman in the retinue of the Venetian envoy in Ferrara Bitelozzo. David Klein: Confidant of Duchess Gubetta. Josef Peter Peretti: Officer of Duke Rustighello. Printer: Rudolph Bechthold. "Miss Mannstein from the Deutsches Theater in Amsterdam as guest".
