= Agnese Schebest =

Austrian opera singer (1813–1870)

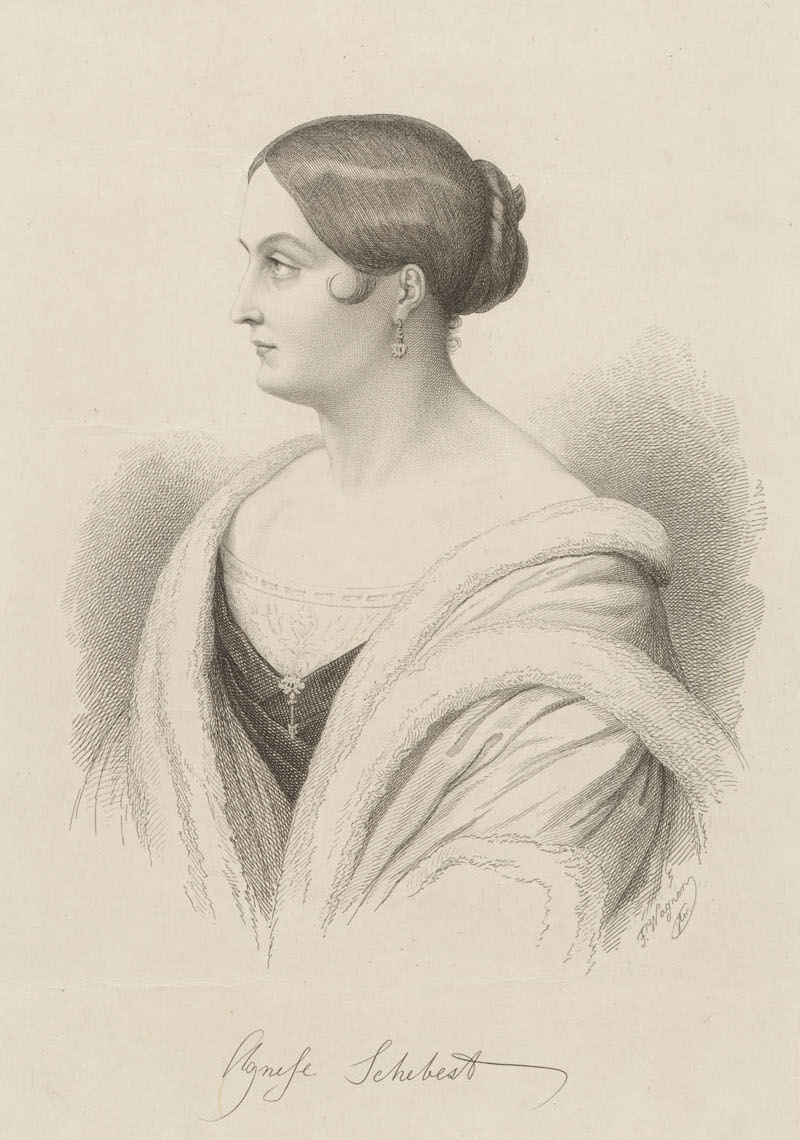
- Born: 10 February 1813; Vienna, Austrian Empire
- Died: 22 January 1870 (aged 56); Stuttgart, Kingdom of Württemberg
- Occupation: Operatic mezzo-soprano
- Spouse: David Friedrich Strauss (m. 1842–1847)

Signature
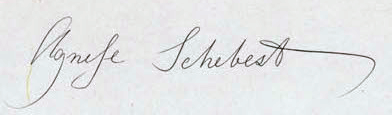

Agnese Schebest (née Agnese Šebesta, also Agnese Schebesta; 10 February 1813 – 22 January 1870) was an Austrian operatic mezzo-soprano. She lived as a singing teacher in Munich and Stuttgart.

== Life and career ==
Schebest was born in Vienna, the daughter of an officer of the Austrian army born in Bohemia. She moved to Prague as a child with her parents due to a change in her father's professional assignment, but he died as early as 1816 as a result of an injury while blasting the fortifications of Alessandria.

She lived with her mother in Theresienstadt, Bohemia, where she attracted attention as a child at church concerts. At the age of eleven she got singing lessons free of charge with Kammersänger Johann Aloys Miksch and acting lessons with the actress Friederike Vohs in Dresden. At the Kingdom of Saxony's Dresden court opera she sang early as a chorister and comprimaria.

Schebest made her opera debut in 1830 as Benjamin in Méhul's Joseph at the Dresden court stage. As a result, she got a job there, which enabled her to take care financially of her family. Other roles included Leonore in Beethoven's Fidelio, Rebecca in Marschner's Der Templer und die Jüdin, Sesto in Mozart's La clemenza di Tito and Alice in Meyerbeer's Robert le diable. At that time Wilhelmine Schröder-Devrient also worked in Dresden and she was deeply impressed by her work.

After two years she terminated the Dresden contract, which also obliged her to act, because she feared that voice training could suffer under the speaking roles. After successful guest appearances in Berlin and Leipzig, she accepted an invitation to the stage in Budapest in spring 1832 where she was under contract until 1836. There she had successes as Agathe in Weber's Der Freischütz, Emmeline in Joseph Weigl's Die Schweizer Familie, Zerline in Mozart's Don Giovanni, Desdemona in Rossini's Otello, in the title role of Cherubini's Médée and especially as Romeo in Bellini's I Capuleti ed i Montecchi.

In 1834 and 1835 she made guest tours to Vienna, Dresden and Graz. After the end of her engagement in Budapest, she gave guest performances at the leading German opera houses from 1836 to 1841. At this time she had her residence in Nuremberg. After a stay in Paris she travelled in Italy in 1841 with performances in Trieste and Venice. Afterwards she came to Weimar, Schwerin, Warsaw, Lemberg, Munich and finally to Karlsruhe in June 1842. She ended her career because she had married the theologian and biographer David Friedrich Strauß. The marriage, which produced two children, was unhappy and ended in divorce after a few years.

Schebest died in Stuttgart at age 56.

== Publications ==
- Aus dem Leben einer Künstlerin Stuttgart: Ebner & Seubert, 1857 (Google-Digitalisat)
- Rede und Geberde. Studien über mündlichen Vortrag und plastischen Ausdruck Leipzig: Abel, 1861
