= František Kohout =

František Kohout (German: Franz Kohaut; died October 1822) was a Czech botanical collector and gardener.

== Life ==
There are no records of his early life. He worked as a gardener's assistant in Jindřichův Hradec, Bohemia. He had no higher education and learned while collecting plants on his first expedition. In 1817–1819, he accompanied botanist Franz Sieber (1789–1844) on an expedition and collected together with him plant material for exsiccata-like series in Crete, Egypt and Palestine. Afterwards Kohout worked for Sieber as a botanical collector in Martinique (1819–1821). Specimens from Martinique were later distributed by Sieber as Herbarium florae Martinicae (Plantae insulae Martinica) and Supplement. Kohout died in October 1822 while together with J. Schmidt on an expedition in Senegal. His material from this expedition was distributed by F. Sieber under the title Flora Senegalensis. Specimens collected by F. Kohout are deposited now in a number of herbaria.

The plant genus "Kohautia" from the family Rubiaceae is named in his honor, as well as the species "Tetrapteris kohauti" Sieber ex Presl (Malpighiaceae) and "Cestrum kohauti" Bercht. & J.Presl (Solanaceae).
