= Johann Aloys Miksch =

German tenor and voice teacher

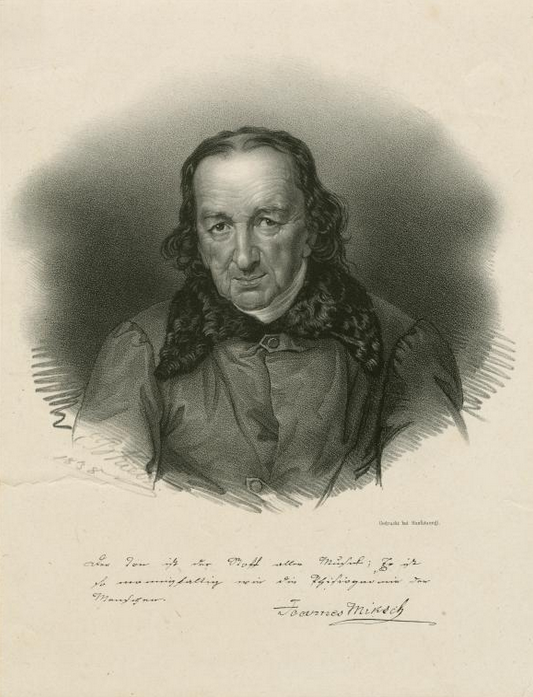
Johann Aloys Miksch (1765–1845), 1938 lithograph by Ernst Benedikt Kietz (The New York Public Library)

Johann (Nepomuk) Aloys Miksch (19 July 1765 – 24 September 1845); sometimes spelled Mie(c)ksch or Johannes) was a Bohemian singer, (tenor) and singing teacher.

== Life ==
Born in St. Georgenthal in Bohemia, in 1777 Miksch became boys' choir of the Dresden court chapel, where he received lessons in singing as well as on the piano and organ. He received his first piano and singing lessons from his father, a cantor and organist in St. Georgenthal. Miksch also studied composition under the Kapellmeister Schuster and in 1783 found employment with the Catholic court church music as a baritone. At the age of 20, he made his first appearance as an opera singer in Dresden. In 1786, he became a ceremonial singer at the Katholische Hofkirche. In 1797, he became tenor of the Italian Opera in Dresden.

After he had become vocally ill due to incorrect voice training, he took singing lessons with the church singer and castrato Vincenzo Caselli. Inspired by him, he now devoted himself exclusively to the study of artistic singing and learned the method followed there under the guidance of Caselli, a pupil of the Bolognese school of Antonio Bernacchi.

In the years 1797–1801, he sang at the Italian Opera in Dresden and from 1801 was singing teacher of the Hofkapellknaben, where he was appointed instructor.

In 1820, at the instigation of Carl Maria von Weber, he became choral director of the Dresdner Hofoper under Weber, and in 1824 also curator of the royal (private) music collection of King Friedrich August II. He retired in 1831. Diary entries by Clara Wieck, who received some singing lessons from Miksch in 1834, provide an interesting insight into his teaching methods. Stuttgart court pianist Anna Sick also studied with him.

Miksch has the merit of having preserved the traditions of older Italian art song in Germany. He also owes his high reputation as a singing teacher to numerous students, among them Johann Gottfried Bergmann, the later singing teacher Ferdinand Sieber and the singers Wilhelmine Schröder-Devrient, Agnese Schebest, Friederike Funk and Henriette Grabau-Bünau.

He was a member of the Dresden masonic lodge Zu den drey Schwerdtern und wahren Freunden. Miksch's brother, Adalbert Alexius Miksch (1776–1814), was a horn player in the Dresden court orchestra and married the opera singer Maria Camilla Angiolini (1789–1824). The soprano was engaged at the Dresden Court Opera from 1816 until her death.

Mikschs died in Dresden at the age of 80.
