= Adolph Kohut =

German-Hungarian journalist, cultural historian and author

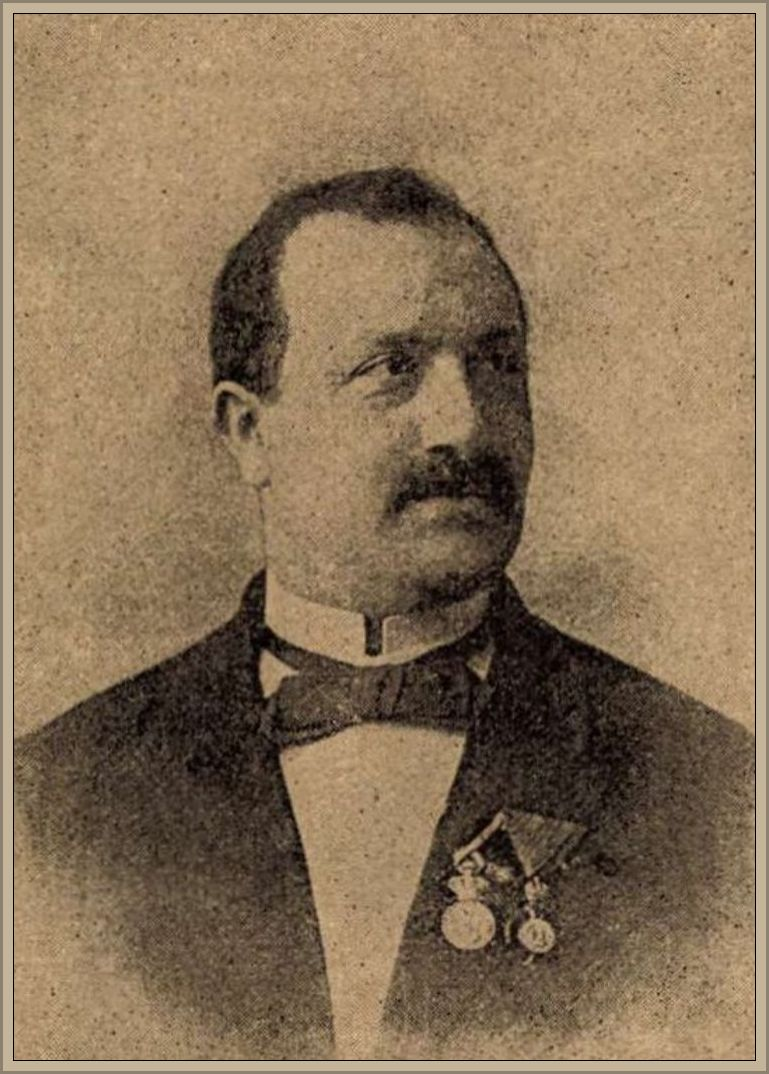

Adolph Kohut (10 November 1848 – 21 or 22 November 1917) was a German-Hungarian journalist, literature and cultural historian, biographer, recitator and translator from Hungarian origin.

== Life ==
Born in Mindszent, Kohut was born as one of thirteen children of the very poor, pious Talmud scholar Jacob Kohut. He studied from 1866 to 1868 at the Jewish Theological Seminary of Breslau as well as his older brother Alexander. Then he studied two semesters new philology and art history at the Friedrich-Wilhelms-Universität in Breslau and afterwards at the Friedrich-Wilhelms-Universität Berlin. In Vienna he lectured for three years at the University of Vienna and received his PhD from the University of Jena in 1878.

In 1872 he was called by Karl von Holtei to the editorial office of the Breslauer Nachrichten. In 1873 he was editor of the Düsseldorfer Zeitung. Leopold Ullstein hired him in 1878 at the Tribüne in Berlin and later at the Berliner Zeitung. Afterwards he edited the magazine Deutsches Heim. "Illustrated entertainment sheet for all estates". Like many other journalists Kohut was also persecuted in different trials according to the Reichspreßgesetz. In one case the prosecutor demanded for him six weeks imprisonment because of offence against § 7, 18 and 19 of the "Gesetz über die Presse".

On September 13, 1884, he was expelled from Prussia as an "unpopular foreigner," after he allegedly attacked Bismarck in an article. In reality, he had been expelled from Berlin at the instigation of the anti-Semite Adolf Stöcker, who had worked for it with the minister Robert von Puttkamer. For the next five years he lived in Dresden. By a letter of 21 December 1889 from the Prussian Legation Council in Saxony of Count August von Dönhoff Kohut was allowed to return to Berlin. In April 1890 he arrived there. Bismarck himself had, as Kohut wrote, never spoken up for his expulsion.

Already sick since 1915, Kohut died in the night of 21 to 22 November 1917 in his Berlin apartment Courbiérestraße 7 at age 69. There was no obituary in the General Zeitung des Judentums and also the Gemeindebote (Berlin) did not mention him on the occasion of his death.

Kohut did not only have conservative, liberal or anti-Semitic German contemporaries, but also (quote: "Some of the personalities were treated as object directly or through their friends to the fact that they were and are Jews, or are descended from Israelites".

Kohut has written more than 120 books and monographs and hundreds of articles in magazines. He also became known as a translator from the Hungarian. His translation of Sándor Petőfi is enduring. He dedicated many of his works to Goethe, Schiller, Kleist, Wieland and others. He also wrote several books about Bismarck and Ferdinand Lassalle. As an avowed Jew he published numerous writings on Jewish personalities, the ritual murder legend and more. He publicly opposed anti-Semitism. Kohut was also a productive collaborator at the Reclam's Universal Library. He made a name for himself through his numerous works on composers. During the First World War he, like many Germans, held chauvinistic positions towards France. Many of his works were reprinted long after his death as facsimile. The database Kalliope-Verbund contains 147 manuscripts from Kohut. Among them are five letters to Edmund Kretschmer, forty-seven to Wolfgang Kirchbach, to the editors of the Literarisches Centralblatt für Deutschland Friedrich Karl Theodor Zarncke and Eduard Zarncke a total of thirteen letters. One letter each from Kohut to Wilhelm Raabe and Emil Rittershaus. Also a letter from Wilhelm Busch to Kohut. An estate of Kohut is not known in the archives. Kohut donated his photograph with the dedication "Herr S. W. Racken hierselbst in Hochächtung und Ergebenheit, REDACTEUR Dr. ADOLPH KOHUT, 4. November 1976" by the photographer G. Overbeck, Düsseldorf.

Since 1877 he was married to primadonna Elisabeth Mannstein (1843–1926), who worked for several years on European stages and last worked as a singing teacher in Berlin. Oswald Kohut was the son of this marriage (1877–1951). A grandson of him was Oswald Adolph Kohut.

== Honours ==
- 1892: Knight of the Order of Franz Joseph
- 1905: Corresponding member of the Petöfi-Gesellschaft of the Hungarian Academy of Sciences
- 1910: Imperial Council (appointment by emperor Franz Joseph I.)
- Zivil-Verdienstkreuz Goldenen Verdienstkreuzes mit Krone
- Verdienstmedaille für Kunst und Wissenschaft mit Krone (Medal of Merit for Art and Science with Crown)
- 1912: Ehrendoktor at the Babeș-Bolyai University
