= Franz Sieber =

Czech-Austrian botanist (1789–1844)

- Born: 30 March 1789; Prague, Bohemia, Habsburg monarchy
- Died: 17 December 1844 (aged 55); Prague, Bohemia, Austrian Empire
- Occupation: Botanist

Franz Wilhelm Sieber (30 March 1789 – 17 December 1844) was a Czech-Austrian botanist and collector who travelled to Europe, the Middle East, Southern Africa and Australia.

== Early life ==
Franz Sieber was born in Prague, Bohemia, on 30 March 1789. After five years of study at the Gymnasium, endowed with a considerable talent for the graphic arts, he studied architecture, switched to engineering and finally settled on natural history, in particular botany.

== Expeditions ==
He made several collecting trips to Italy, Crete, Greece, Egypt and Palestine followed by a two-year-long expedition to Australia, Mauritius and South Africa, collecting not only plants, but also animals, art and ethnographic objects. He spent seven months in Sydney (then more usually called Port Jackson) from 1 June 1823 until December 1823 where he collected 645 local plant specimens.

He never reached the Western hemisphere (in contradistinction to Friedrich Wilhelm Sieber, an employee of Johann Centurius Hoffmannsegg), but sent several people to make collections for him, notably Franz Kohaut in the Antilles and Wenceslas Bojer, Carl Hilsenberg on Mauritius and Karl Ludwig Philipp Zeyher in South Africa. Sieber distributed many herbarium specimens in more than 25 specimens series which resemble exsiccatae. The two largest by number are entitled Herbarium florae Austriacae and Herbarium florae Novae Hollandiae.

== Later life and death ==
His behaviour and publications became progressively more erratic. He was constantly involved in quarrels with the authorities and rapidly became more and more deranged. Having "discovered" a cure for rabies he appeared in front of the city elders of Prague and demanded financial support. Soon thereafter he landed in the Prague insane asylum, where he spent the fourteen final years of his life, dying there in 1844 at the age of 55.

== Legacy ==
He is commemorated in the genus Siebera J.Gay (Asteraceae), and many species, e.g. Acacia sieberiana, DC, Pleurothallis sieberi Luer, or Allium sieberianum Schult.f., Crocus sieberi, Phyteuma sieberi, Luzula sieberi, Eucalyptus sieberi, Cheilanthes sieberi, Callistemon sieberi, Badula sieberi, and Hosta sieberiana, though some of these names may also have honored Friedrich Wilhelm Sieber.
