= Frédéric Louis Godet =

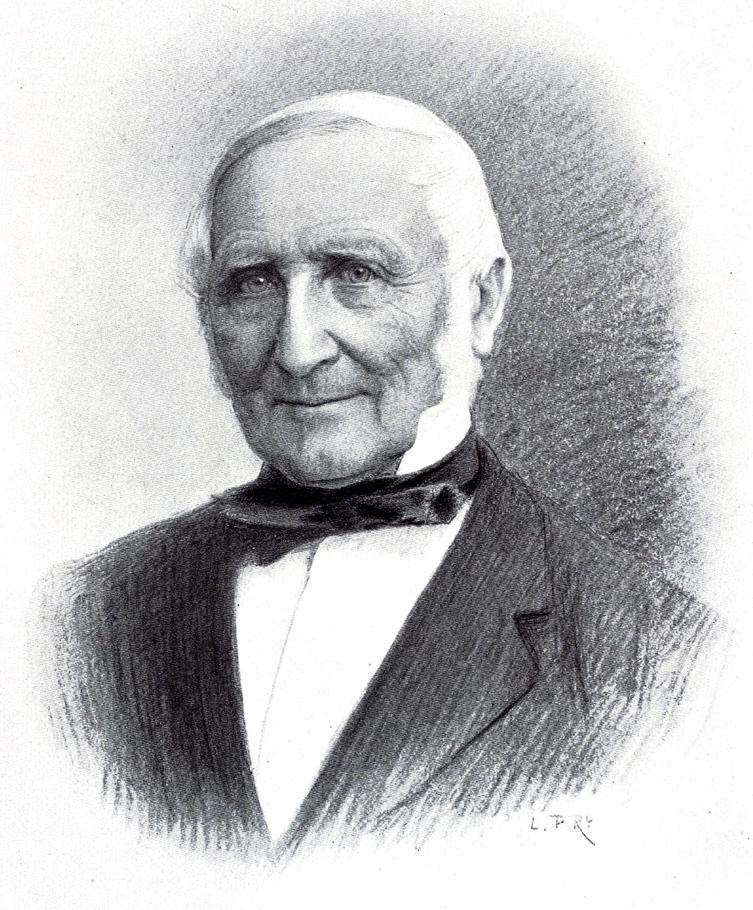
- Born: 25 October 1812; Neuchâtel, Switzerland
- Died: 29 October 1900 (aged 88); Neuchâtel, Switzerland

Academic work
- Discipline: theology
- Institutions: University of Neuchâtel
- Notable works: Commentary on the Gospel of John

Frédéric Louis Godet (25 October 1812, Neuchâtel – 29 October 1900, Neuchâtel) was a Swiss Protestant theologian.

== Biography ==
Godet was born on 25 October 1812 in Neuchâtel. His father, Paul-Henri, who was a lawyer, died early. His mother, Eusébie née Gallot, a pious, strong and intelligent pastor's daughter, who founded a girls' school, devoted herself to his early training.

He conducted preparatory studies in Neuchâtel, and then studied theology in Berlin and Bonn. There, he came into contact with the leading theologians of the day, like Hengstenberg, Tholuck, Nitzsh, Steffens, Neander and Schleiermacher. Of these, Neander exerted the greatest influence on him. Important spiritual influences came from Otto von Gerlach and Baron von Kottwitz, ensuring an emphasis on piety rather than mere intellectualism. Nikolaus von Zinzendorf and Johannes Gossner also helped him overcome a spiritual crisis and come to a wholehearted commitment and faith in God's grace.

Upon graduation in 1836, he returned to Neuchâtel, where he was ordained to the ministry and became pastor of two small parishes. In 1838, however, he returned to Berlin in order to succeed his mother as tutor for the crown prince, Frederick William of Prussia. The prince was a receptive pupil for the clergyman, who taught him fear of God, and Godet remained a close friend of the Emperor to be for the rest of the latter's life. When he left Berlin, in 1844, he received a lifetime pension from the Prussian royal family, and was appointed chaplain to the Prince Royal of Prussia, William I.

He retained the position until 1844, when he once again returned to his home town, where he became deacon of the churches of Val-de-Ruz (1844-1850) He devoted himself with great energy to the practical works of the churches, organizing Sabbath schools and other agencies. The same year he married Caroline Vautravers. In 1850, he was appointed professor of theology at Neuchâtel, having charge of New Testament Criticism and Exegesis, and later also of Old Testament Introduction. From 1851 to 1866 he also held a pastorate in Neuchâtel, and he tirelessly set up religious agencies and philanthropic associations.

By 1873, the Church of Neuchâtel had lost both its freedom and its orthodoxy, as the state passed a law that made every citizen a member of the church by virtue of his birth, and ministers were declared eligible for office apart from subscription to any creed. In response, Godet became one of the founders of the free Evangelical Church of Neuchâtel, and professor in its theological faculty.

He retired in 1887, and was succeeded as professor by his son George. Afterward, he continued to publish. Godet did much to interpret German theological thought to French–speaking Protestants, and the English translations of his works made him influential in international New Testament scholarship. Godet died on 29 October 1900 in Neuchâtel. Another son of his, Philippe Godet, became a professor of French literature at University of Neuchâtel and published his biography in 1913.

== Theology ==
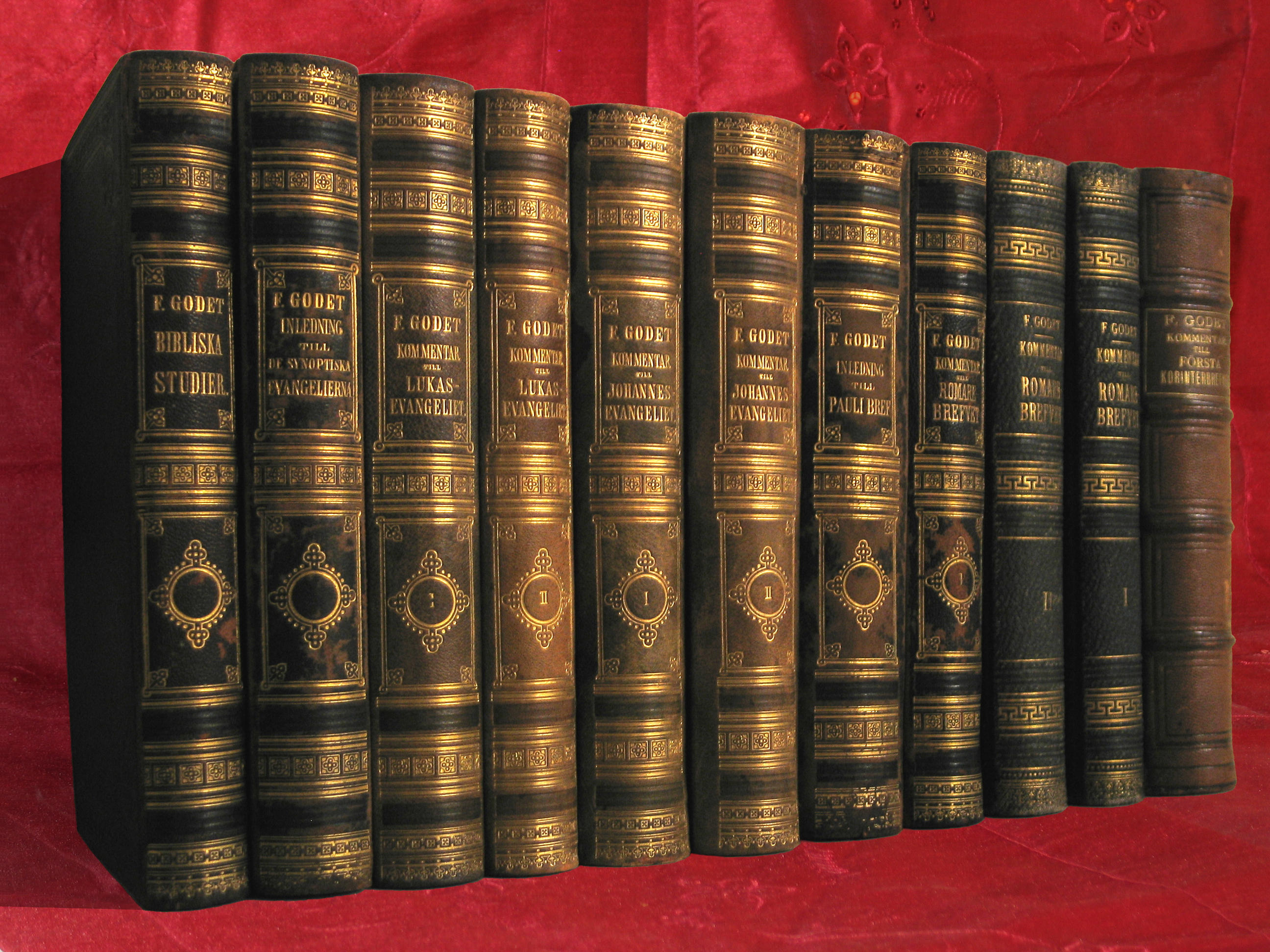
A set of Godet's Bible commentaries in Swedish

Godet was the author of some of the most noteworthy commentaries of the time, which have been translated into many languages and are still in print, as well as numerous articles. His Commentary on the Gospel of John, which continues the line of interpretation of Christoph Ernst Luthardt, ranks as the most prominent of his works. Throughout his works, he defends the authenticity and reliability of the New Testament, and particularly the gospels.

Godet was himself not a textual critic. With regards to the debate between the traditional Byzantine (Greco-Latin) text and Alexandrian critical text, Godet considerately and contextually examined longer readings in the textus receptus, but expressed his hope for a "decisive [...] discovery of a document of the Greek text anterior to the period when the beginning of alterations can be established." Godet did believe some "received readings" might be "corrections," but also wrote; "there are cases where in my opinion the Greco-Latin text is certainly preferable to the so-called neutral text of B and א, and in general to the reading of all the others, there are also cases, and in considerable numbers, where the texts called ante-Syrian by Hort and Westcott are decidely inferior, when weighed in the balance of context, to the Byzantine readings." At the end of his Introduction to his commentary on John's Gospel, he made the appeal: "I merely ask of the reader an impartial and attentive study of the context in every particular case. All I wish by these reflections is, to keep open the question which there is an apparent wish to close." Godet was critical of what he considered "learned ignorance" and prejudiced favouring of "Alexandrine" readings.

Rejecting the Calvinist position on predestination, Godet has often been appealed to by Arminian theologians. In Christology, he held the modernist kenotic theory of Wolfgang Friedrich Gess, according to which incarnation meant, not the assumption of two distinct states by one subject, but the voluntary reduction of a divine subject to the human state. His work contributed to changing the ways of approaching the kenotic motif among New Testament scholars. Regarding atonement, he affirmed a reconciliation of God to man as well as man to God, but was regarded by some as thinking that Christ's sufferings met the divine claims in relation to sin not by satisfying and compensating but by revealing and recognising them, thereby expressing the Moral influence theory of atonement and the Governmental theory of atonement. But compare the first page of the preface to the book of Romans.

In his The Six Days of Creation, he argued, following Hugh Miller, for an old earth.

In addition, he was an ardent defender of orthodox evangelical Christianity against supporters of liberal Protestantism such as Ferdinand Buisson.

== Awards ==
- Doctor "honoris causa" from University of Basel and University of Edinburgh.

== Works ==
=== Translated in English ===
- Godet, Frédéric (1879). Commentary on the Gospel of John: with an historical and critical introduction. Vol. 1. 3 volumes. Edinburgh: T. & T. Clark.
- Godet, Frédéric (1879). Commentary on the Gospel of John: with an historical and critical introduction. Vol. 2. 3 volumes. Edinburgh: T. & T. Clark.
- Godet, Frédéric (1879). Commentary on the Gospel of John: with an historical and critical introduction. Vol. 3. 3 volumes. Edinburgh: T. & T. Clark.
- Godet, Frédéric (1883). Commentary on St. Paul's Epistle to the Romans. Vol. 1. 2 volumes. New York: Funk & Wagnalls.
- Godet, Frédéric (1883). Commentary on St. Paul's Epistle to the Romans. Vol. 2. 2 volumes. New York: Funk & Wagnalls.
- Godet, Frédéric (1889). A Commentary on the Gospel of St. Luke. Vol. 1. 2 volumes. Edinburgh: T. & T. Clark.
- Godet, Frédéric (1889). A Commentary on the Gospel of St. Luke. Vol. 2. 2 volumes. Edinburgh: T. & T. Clark.
- Godet, Frédéric (1889). Commentary on St. Paul's First Epistle to the Corinthians. Vol. 1. 2 volumes. Edinburgh: T. & T. Clark.
- Godet, Frédéric (1889). Commentary on St. Paul's First Epistle to the Corinthians. Vol. 2. 2 volumes. Edinburgh: T. & T. Clark.
- Godet, Frédéric (1889). Studies on the Epistles of St. Paul. New York: Hodder and Stoughton.
- Godet, Frédéric (1873). Studies on the New Testament. London: Hodder and Stoughton.
- Godet, Frédéric (1882). Studies of Creation and Life. Boston: Congregational Publishing Society. Containing The Six Days of Creation
- Godet, Frédéric (1895). Lectures in Defence of the Christian Faith. Edinburgh: T&T Clark.

=== In French ===
- Godet, Frédéric (1849). Trois dialogues sur la loi ecclésiastique (in French). [Neuchatel]: [Wolfrath].
- Godet, Frédéric (1859). Histoire de la Réformation et du Refuge : dans le Pays de Neuchâtel (in French). Neuchatel: Librairie L. Meyer et Comp.
- Godet, Frédéric (1872). Commentaires sur l'Évangile de saint Luc (in French). Vol. 1. Paris: Librairie Sandoz et Fischbacher.
- Godet, Frédéric (1872). Commentaires sur l'Évangile de saint Luc (in French). Vol. 2. Paris: Librairie Sandoz et Fischbacher.
- Godet, Frédéric (1876). Commentaire sur l'évangile de Saint Jean (in French). Vol. 1. Paris: Librairie Sandoz et Fischbacher.
- Godet, Frédéric (1865). Commentaire sur l'évangile de Saint Jean (in French). Vol. 2. Paris: Librairie française et étrangère.
- Godet, Frédéric (1877). Commentaire sur l'évangile de Saint Jean (in French). Vol. 3. Paris: Librairie Sandoz et Fischbacher.
- Godet, Frédéric (1883). Commentaires sur l'épître aux Romains (in French). Vol. 1. Neuchatel: Librairie J. Sandoz.
- Godet, Frédéric (1890). Commentaires sur l'épître aux Romains (in French). Vol. 2. Paris: Librairie Grassart.
- Godet, Frédéric; Gretillat, Augustin; Monvert, Charles; de Coulon, Paul; Bovet, Félix (1898). La Bible annotée : Ancien Testament (in French). Neuchâtel: Attinger Frères.
- Godet, Frédéric (2006). Introduction au NT : les évangiles synoptiques (in French). Vol. 1. [Paris]: ThéoTeX.
- Godet, Frédéric (2006). Introduction au Nouveau Testament : les Épîtres de Paul (in French). Vol. 2. [Paris]: ThéoTeX.
- Godet, Frédéric (2008). Commentaires sur la première épître aux Corinthiens (in French). [Paris]: ThéoTeX.
- Godet, Frédéric (2010). Études Bibliques (in French). [Paris]: ThéoTeX.

== Notes and references ==
=== Sources ===
- Montan, Gustaf (1914). "Frédéric Godet. Hans lif och personlighet". Bibelforskaren. Tidskrift för skrifttolkning och praktisk kristendom (in Swedish). 13.
- Salmond, S.D.F. (1885). "Fréderic Godet" (PDF). The Expositor. 3. 13 (6).
- Stoddard, Jane T. (1913). "A Swiss Fénelon: Dr. Godet and the Emperor Frederick" (PDF). The Expositor. 8. 5 (5).
- Hammann, Gottfried (2005). "Frédéric Godet". Dictionnaire historique de la Suisse (in French). London: Smith, Elder & Co.
