= Johann Salomo Semler =

German church historian, biblical commentator and critic

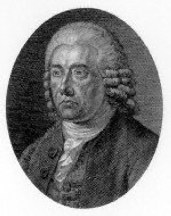
Johann Salomo Semler

Johann Salomo Semler (German: [ˈzɛmlɐ]; 18 December 1725 – 14 March 1791) was a German church historian, biblical commentator, and critic of ecclesiastical documents and of the history of dogmas. He is sometimes known as "the father of German rationalism".

== Youth and education ==
He was born at Saalfeld in Saxe-Saalfeld, the son of a clergyman. He grew up in Pietistic surroundings, which powerfully influenced him his life through, though he never became a Pietist. In his seventeenth year he entered the University of Halle, where he became the disciple, afterwards the assistant, and finally the literary executor of the orthodox rationalistic professor S. J. Baumgarten. He also studied at Halle's Institutum Judaicum under Johann Heinrich Callenberg. He also wrote Latin poems. In 1749 he accepted the position of editor, with the title of professor, of the Coburg official Gazette. But in 1751 he was invited to the University of Altdorf as professor of philology and history, and in 1752 he became a professor of theology at Halle.

== Early work ==
After the death of Baumgarten in 1757, Semler became head of the theological faculty, and the fierce opposition provoked by his writings and lectures only helped increase his fame as a professor. His popularity continued undiminished until 1779. In that year he produced a reply (Beantwortung der Fragmente eines Ungenannten) to the Wolfenbuttel Fragments (see Reimarus) and to K. F. Bahrdt's confession of faith, a step which was interpreted by the extreme rationalists as a revocation of his own rationalistic position.

== Later work and impact ==
=== Contemporary perception ===
Even the Prussian government, which favoured Bahrdt, made known its displeasure at this new but quite consistent aspect of his position. But, though Semler was not inconsistent with himself in attacking the views of Reimarus and Bahrdt, his popularity began to decline, and towards the end of his life he felt a need to emphasize the apologetic and conservative value of true historical inquiry. His defence of the notorious edict of July 9, 1788, issued by the Prussian minister for ecclesiastical affairs, Johann Christoph von Wöllner, the object of which was to enforce Lutheran orthodoxy, might be cited as a sign of the decline of his powers and of an unfaithfulness to his principles. He died at Halle, Magdeburg, exhausted and disappointed.

=== Classification ===
The importance of Semler, sometimes called "the father of German rationalism", in the history of theology and the human mind is that of a critic of biblical and ecclesiastical documents and of the history of dogmas. He was not a philosophical thinker or theologian, though he insisted, with an energy and persistency before unknown, on certain distinctions of great importance when properly worked out and applied, e.g. the distinction between religion and theology, that between private personal beliefs and public historical creeds, and that between the local and temporal and the permanent elements of historical religion. His great work was that of the critic. He was the first to reject the equal value of the Old and New Testaments, the uniform authority of all parts of the Bible, the divine authority of the traditional canon of Scripture, the inspiration and supposed correctness of the text of the Old and New Testaments, and, generally, the identification of revelation with Scripture.

Though to some extent anticipated by the British deist, Thomas Morgan, Semler was the first to take due note of and use for critical purposes the opposition between the Judaic and anti-Judaic parties of the early church. He led the way in the task of discovering the origin of the Gospels, the Epistles, the Acts of the Apostles, and the Apocalypse. He revived previous doubts as to the direct Pauline origin of the Epistle to the Hebrews, called in question Peter's authorship of the first epistle, and referred the second epistle to the end of the 2nd century. He wished to remove the Apocalypse altogether from the canon. In textual criticism Semler pursued further the principle of classifying manuscripts in families, adopted by Richard Simon and Johann Albrecht Bengel.

In church history, Semler did the work of a pioneer in many periods and in several departments. Friedrich Tholuck pronounced him "the father of the history of doctrines," and Ferdinand Christian Baur "the first to deal with that history from the true critical standpoint." At the same time, it is admitted by all that he was nowhere more than a pioneer.

His concept of church has been contrasted with Friedrich Schleiermacher's.

== Bibliography ==
Tholuck gives 171 as the number of Semler's works, of which only two reached a second edition. Amongst the major ones are:

- Commentatio de demoniacis (Halle, 1760, 4th ed. 1779)
- Umständliche Untersuchung der damonischen Leute (1762)
- Versuch einer biblischen Damonologie (1776)
- Selecta capita historiae ecclesiasticae (3 vols., Halle, 1767–1769)
- Abhandlung von freier Untersuchung des Kanon (Halle, 1771–1775)
- Apparatus ad liberalem N. T. interpretationem (1767, ad V. T., 1773)
- Institutio ad doctrinam Christ. liberaliter discendam (Halle, 1774),
- Über historische, gesellschaftliche, und moralische Religion der Christen (1786)
- Semler's Lebensbeschreibung, von ihm selbst abgefasst (Halle, 1781–1782) autobiography

For estimates of Semler, see:

- Wilhelm Gass, Geschichte der protestantischen Dogmatik (Berlin, 1854–1867)
- Isaak Dorner, Geschichte der protestantischen Theologie (Munich, 1867)
- Article in Herzog's Realencyklopädie
- Adolf Hilgenfeld, Historische-kritische Einleitung in das Neue Testament (Leipzig, 1875)
- F. C. Baur, Epochen der kirchlichen Geschichtsschreibung (1852)
- Albrecht Ritschl, Geschichte des Pietismus (Bonn. 1880-1888)
