= Leopold Witte =

German Protestant theologian and educator

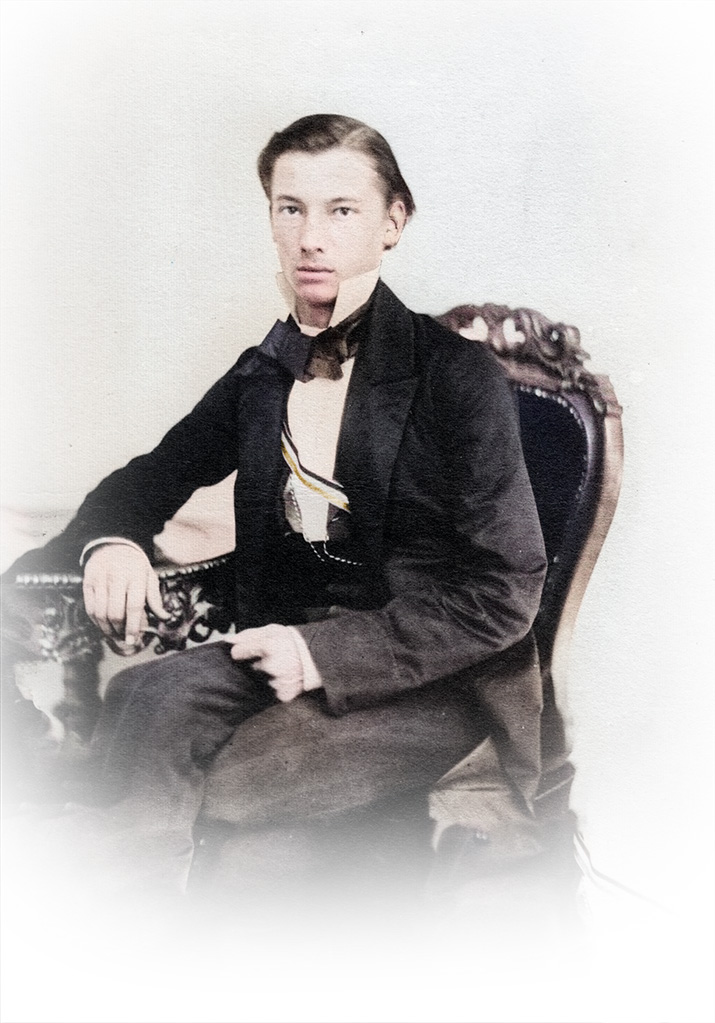
Leopold Witte, 1855

Leopold Witte (9 June 1836, in Halle an der Saale – 2 December 1921) was a German Protestant theologian and educator. He was the son of Dante scholar Karl Witte (1800–1883).

From 1853 to 1857 he studied Protestant theology at the universities of Halle and Heidelberg, and afterwards worked as a tutor at the Prussian Embassy in Rome. In 1861 he was ordained as a minister in Berlin, and he subsequently served as a pastor in the town of Cöthen, near Eberswalde. From 1873 to 1879 he lived in the United States, and following his return to Germany, served as a professor and superintendent at Schulpforta (1879–1900). In 1888 he received an honorary doctorate in theology from the University of Greifswald.

== Published works ==
He was the author of a well-received biography on theologian August Tholuck, titled Das Leben d. Friedrich August Gottreu Tholuck's, (2 volumes, 1884–86). His treatise on humanist Pietro Carnesecchi and the Italian Inquisition, Pietro Carnesecchi : ein Bild aus der italienischen Märtyrergeschichte (1883), was translated into English and published as: A glance at the Italian Inquisition: a sketch of Pietro Carnesecchi: his trial before the supreme court of the papal inquisition in Rome, and his martyrdom in 1566 (John Thomas Betts, 1885). His other principal works include:

- Friedrich der Grosse und die Jesuiten, 1892 – Frederick the Great and the Jesuits.
- Die erneuerung der Schlosskirche zu Wittenberg : eine that evangelischen Bekenntnisses, 1894 – The renewal of the All Saints' Church, Wittenberg.
- Richard Rothe über Jesus als Wundertäter, 1907 – Richard Rothe on Jesus as a miracle worker.
