= Gretillat =

Gretillat or Grétillat (English: /ɡrɛtiːˈjɑː/, French: [ɡʁetija]) is a surname. Notable people with the surname include:

- Augustin Gretillat (1837–1894), Swiss Protestant pastor, theologian, and professor
- Jacques Grétillat (1885–1950), French actor and film director
