= Werner Müller (ethnologist) =

German anthropologist (1907–1990)

Werner Müller (born 22 May 1907, Emmerich; died 8 March 1990, Bad Urach) was a German ethnologist and symbologist. His principal field of research, and the subject of several books, was the Native American mythology and literature of North America, though his studies of the sacral patterns in the founding of European settlements (e.g. Kreis und Kreuz, 1938: Die heilige Stadt, 1961) were also substantial.

He obtained his doctorate in 1930 under Carl Clemen and was appointed university lecturer in 1942 in Ethnology at the Straßburg Reichs-University.

== Works ==
in German

- Die ältesten amerikanischen Sintfluterzählungen (PhD dissertation 1930)
- Kreis und Kreuz. Untersuchungen zur sakralen Siedlung bei Italikern und Germanen (Berlin 1938)
- Die Blaue Hütte. Zum Sinnbild der Perle bei nordamerikanischen Indianern (Wiesbaden 1954)
- Weltbild und Kult der Kwakiutl-Indianer (Wiesbaden 1955)
- Die Religionen der Waldlandindianer Nordamerikas (Berlin 1956)
- 'Die Religionen der Indianervölker Nordamerikas', in: Die Religionen des alten Amerika : Religionen der Menschheit Vol. 7 (Stuttgart 1961).
- Die heilige Stadt. Roma quadrata, himmlisches Jerusalem und die Mythe vom Weltnabel (Stuttgart 1961)
- Glauben und Denken der Sioux. Zur Gestalt archaischer Weltbilder (Berlin 1970)
- Indianische Welterfahrung (Frankfurt 1981)
- Amerika - Die Neue oder die Alte Welt? (1982)

in English

- Müller, Werner (1987). "North American Indians: Indians of the Far North". In Mircea Eliade (ed.). The Encyclopedia of Religion. Vol. 10. New York: Macmillan. ISBN 0-02-909810-6.

== Sources ==
- Berthold Riese: Müller, Werner, in: Neue Deutsche Biographie Vol. 18 (Duncker & Humblot, Berlin 1997), pp. 482–484. (in German)
