= Johann Kaspar Bluntschli =

Swiss jurist and politician (1808–1881)

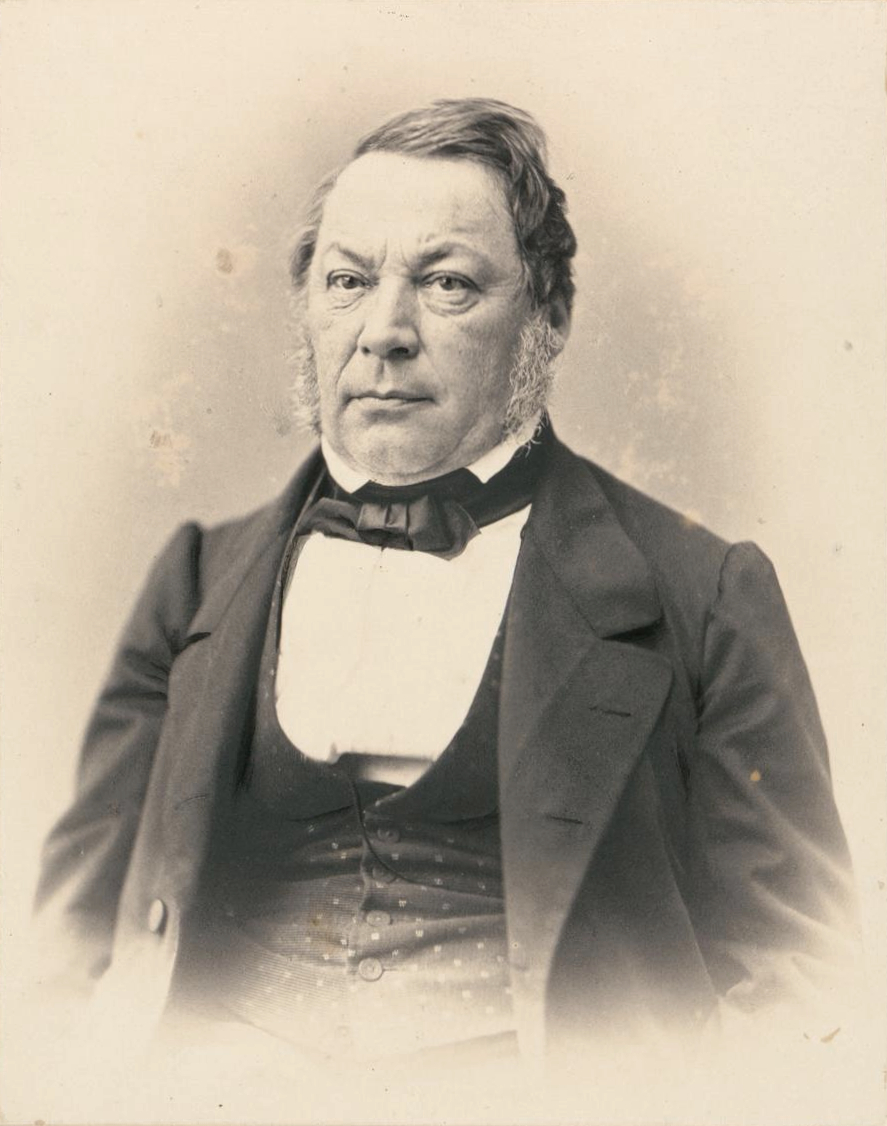
- Born: 7 March 1808; Zürich, Switzerland
- Died: 21 October 1881 (aged 73); Karlsruhe, German Empire

Philosophical work
- School: German Historical School
- Main interests: International law, constitutional law, International humanitarian law, forms of the state

Johann Caspar (also Kaspar) Bluntschli (7 March 1808 – 21 October 1881) was a Swiss jurist and politician. Together with fellow liberals Francis Lieber and Édouard René de Laboulaye, he developed one of the first codes of international law and war.

== Biography ==
He was born in Zürich to a soap and candle manufacturer. From school he passed into the Politische Institut (a seminary of law and political science) in his native town, and proceeding thence to the universities of Berlin and Bonn, took the degree of doctor juris in the latter in 1829.

Returning to Zürich in 1830, he threw himself with ardour into the political strife which was at the time unsettling all the cantons of the Confederation, and in this year published Über die Verfassung der Stadt Zürich (On the Constitution of the City of Zürich). This was followed by Das Volk und der Souverän (1830), a work in which, while pleading for constitutional government, he showed his bitter repugnance of the growing Swiss radicalism. Elected in 1837 a member of the Great Council (German: Grosser Rath), he became the champion of the moderate conservative party.

Fascinated by the metaphysical views of the philosopher Friedrich Rohmer (1814–1856), a man who attracted little other attention, he endeavoured in Psychologische Studien über Staat und Kirche (1844) to apply them to political science generally, and in particular as a panacea for the constitutional troubles of Switzerland. Bluntschli, shortly before his death, remarked, "I have gained renown as a jurist, but my greatest desert is to have comprehended Rohmer." This philosophical essay, however, coupled with his uncompromising attitude towards both radicalism and ultramontanism, brought him many enemies, and rendered his continuance in the council, of which he had been elected president, impossible. He resigned his seat, and on the overthrow of the Sonderbund in 1847, perceiving that all hope of power for his party was lost, took leave of Switzerland with the pamphlet Stimme eines Schweizers über die Bundesreform (1847), and settled at Munich, where he became professor of constitutional law in 1848 at the Ludwig-Maximilians-Universität München (LMU).

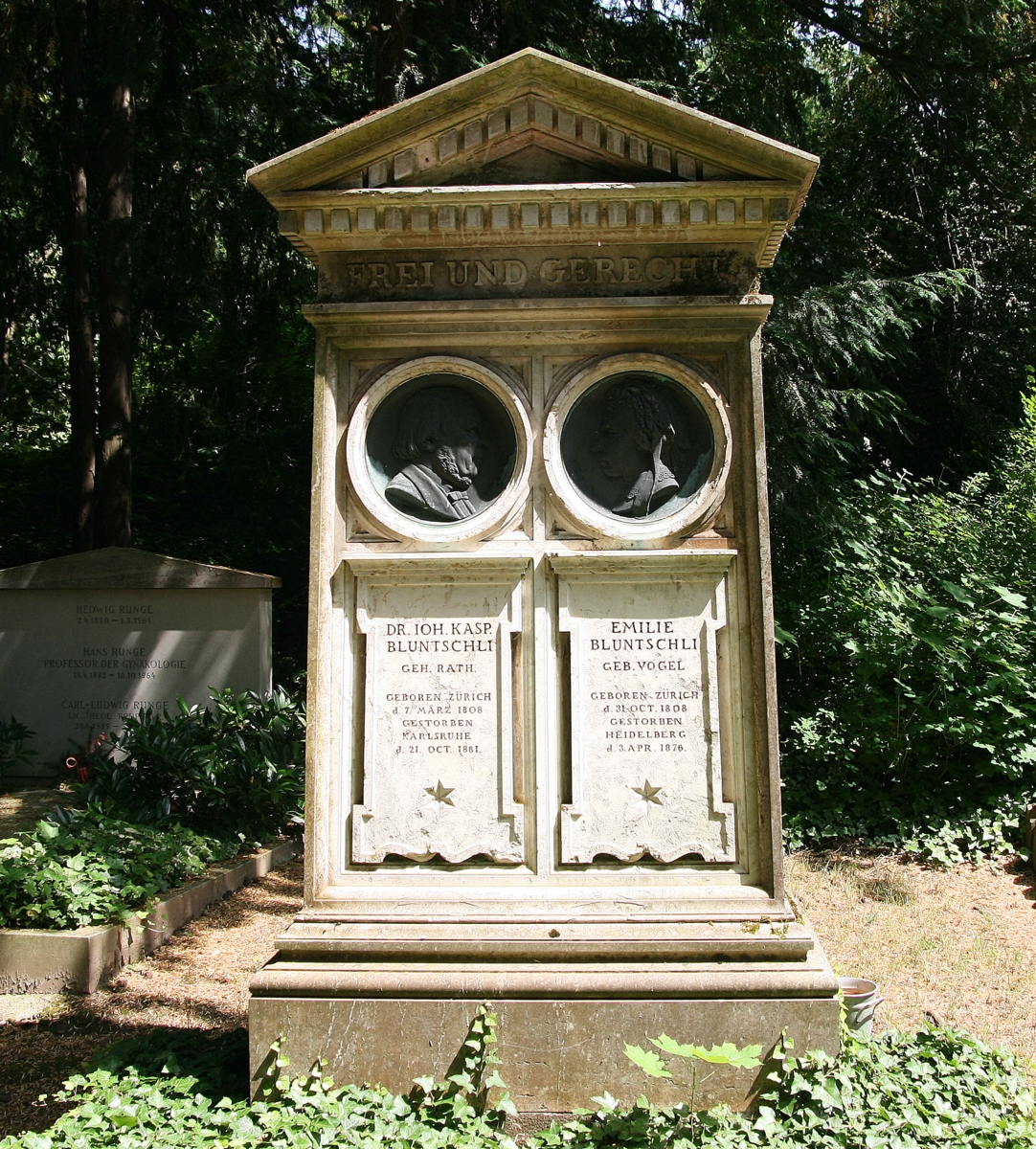
Grave in Heidelberg

Upon resettling in Germany, Bluntschli's stance became more liberal and he elaborated an ethical Hegelian theory of the state which was highly influential among both German and American liberals. At Munich he devoted himself with energy to the special work of his chair, and published Allgemeines Staatsrecht (1851–1852); Lehre vom modernen Staat (1875–1876); and, in conjunction with Karl Ludwig Theodor Brater (1819–1869), Deutsches Staatswörterbuch (11 vols, 1857–1870; abridged by Edgar Loening in 3 vols., 1869–1875). Meanwhile, he had assiduously worked at his code for the canton of Zürich, Privatrechtliches Gesetzbuch für den Kanton Zürich (1854–1856), a work which was much praised at the time, and which, particularly the section devoted to contracts, served as a model for codes both in Switzerland and other countries.

In 1861 Bluntschli received a call to Heidelberg as professor of constitutional law (Staatsrecht), where he again entered the political arena, endeavouring in his Geschichte des allgemeinen Staatsrechts und der Politik (1864) to stimulate, as he said, the political consciousness of the German people, to cleanse it of prejudices and to further it intellectually. He was a Freemason and was Master of Lodge Ruprecht zu den fünf Rosen and in 1865 published a public letter against Pope Pius IX's apostolic exhortation Multiplices inter. In his new home, Baden, he devoted his energies and political influence, during the Austro-Prussian War of 1866, towards keeping the country neutral. From this time Bluntschli became active in the field of international law, and his fame as a jurist belongs rather to this province than to that of constitutional law. His Das moderne Kriegsrecht (1866); Das moderne Völkerrecht der zivilisierten Staaten, als Rechtsbuch dargestellt (1868), and Das Beuterecht im Krieg (1878) are likely to remain invaluable text-books in this branch of the science of jurisprudence. He also wrote a pamphlet on the Alabama case. His work on the laws of war and public international law were influenced by a long correspondence with Francis Lieber, a German émigré to the United States.

Bluntschli was one of the founders, at Ghent in 1873, of the Institute of International Law, and was the representative of the German emperor at the conference on the international laws of war at Brussels. He corresponded with the younger Gustave Rolin-Jaequemyns and Gustave Moynier about matters pertaining to International Humanitarian Law and the Red Cross. During the latter years of his life he took a lively interest in the Protestantenverein, a society formed to combat reactionary and ultramontane views of theology.

He was elected a foreign member of the Royal Netherlands Academy of Arts and Sciences in 1875.

He died suddenly at Karlsruhe on October 21, 1881. His library was acquired by Johns Hopkins University.

Among his works, other than those before mentioned, may be cited Deutsches Privatrecht (1853–1854); Deutsche Slaatslehre für Gebildete (1874); and Deutsche Staatslehre und die heutige Staatenwelt (1880).
