= Emmerich am Rhein =

Emmerich
- Town
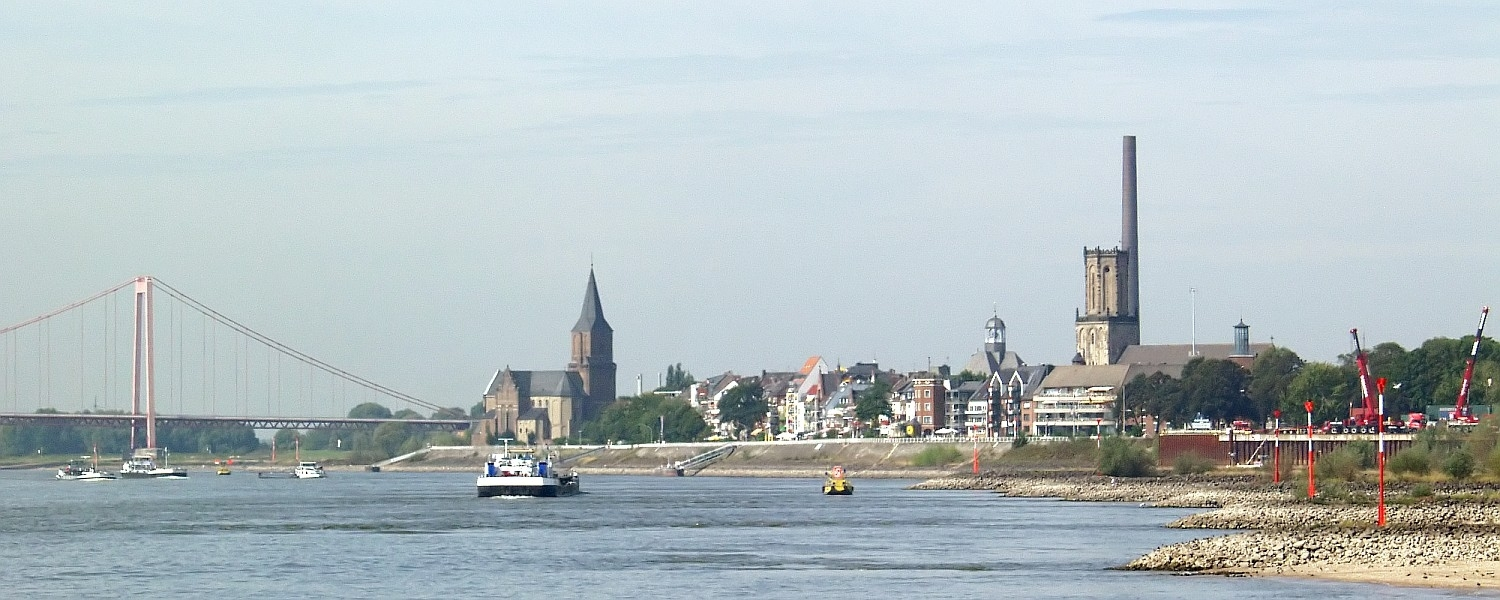
- Emmerich am Rhein as seen from the east

- Flag Coat of arms

- Location of Emmerich within Kleve district
- Interactive map of Emmerich
- Location within Germany Location within North Rhine-Westphalia
- Coordinates: 51°50′6″N 6°14′43″E
- Country: Germany
- State: North Rhine-Westphalia
- Admin. region: Düsseldorf
- District: Kleve
- Founded: 700
- Subdivisions: 8

Government
  - Mayor (2020–25): Peter Hinze (SPD)

Area
  - Total: 80.4 km^{2} (31.0 sq mi)
- Elevation: 15 m (49 ft)

Population (2025-12-31)
  - Total: 31,736
  - Density: 395/km^{2} (1,020/sq mi)
- Time zone: UTC+01:00 (CET)
  - Summer (DST): UTC+02:00 (CEST)
- Postal codes: 46446
- Dialling codes: 0 28 22; 0 28 28 (Elten)
- Vehicle registration: KLE
- Website: www.emmerich.de

Emmerich am Rhein (German pronunciation: [ˈɛmərɪç ʔam ˈʁaɪn], lit. 'Emmerich on the Rhine'; Low Rhenish and Dutch: Emmerik) is a city and municipality in the northwest of the German federal state of North Rhine-Westphalia. The city has a harbour and a quay at the Rhine. In terms of local government organization, it is a medium-sized city belonging to the district of Kleve in the administrative region (Regierungsbezirk) of Düsseldorf.

== Geography ==
Emmerich lies on the north bank of the Rhine, just within the German borders, and is the last German town on the Rhine before the river flows into the Netherlands, which is 4 km to the north and 5 km to the west.

=== Villages belonging to Emmerich am Rhein ===
The populated places which comprise the municipality of Emmerich am Rhein are Emmerich, Borghees, Dornick, Elten, Hüthum, Klein-Netterden, Leegmeer, Praest, Speelberg and Vrasselt.

=== Neighboring municipalities and cities ===
To the north, the municipality of Emmerich borders the Dutch municipalities of Montferland and Oude IJsselstreek; both of which are in the Dutch province of Gelderland. To the east, it is bordered by the German city of Rees. To the south, it is bordered by the Rhine, and south of this river, by the German city of Kleve. To the west, it is bordered by the Dutch municipality of Zevenaar, which is also in the Dutch province of Gelderland.

== History ==
Emmerich, formerly called Embrika and Emrik, was originally a Roman colony. Around the year 700 Saint Willibrord founded the mission "Emmerich" in the Utrecht diocese. The oldest documented name is Villa Embrici, dating back to the year 828.

The collegiate church St. Martinikirche was constructed in 1040.

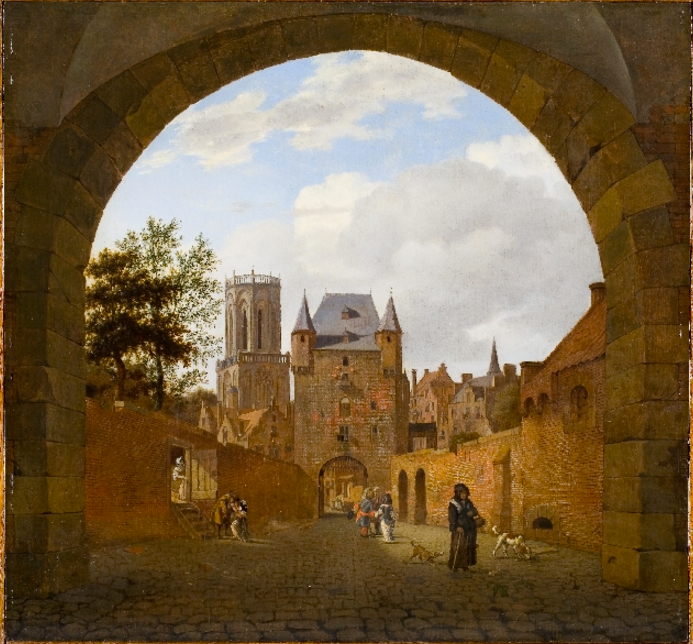
The Water Gate in Emmerich am Rhein by Jan van der Heyden, c. 1664

On 31 May 1233, Count Otto von Zutphen and Gelder became the royal of the city with the authorization of the Roman Emperor Frederick II and the German King Henry (VII). In 1371, Emmerich fell to the Duchy of Cleves, The town joined the Hanseatic League in 1407. In 1609, Cleves, and by extension Emmerich, became part of Brandenburg. In 1686, a commune of French Huguenots was founded in the town. In 1794, it was bombarded by the French under General Vandamme, and in 1806 it was assigned to the Duchy of Berg. It passed into the possession of Prussia in 1815.

In 1856, the railway section Oberhausen-Arnhem of the Cologne-Mindener Railway was opened.

On 7 October 1944, 91% of Emmerich was destroyed as a strategic bombing target of the Oil Campaign of World War II. In 1949, Elten was annexed by the Netherlands until 1963.

Since 1 February 2001, the city has officially been called Emmerich am Rhein, as until then it was simply known as Emmerich.

On 28 November 2004 the four Catholic congregations of the city (St. Martini, St. Aldegundis, Heilig-Geist and Liebfrauen) combined to form the new city parish St. Christophorus.

=== Municipality and county reform ===
As a part of the 1st municipal restructuring program, the municipalities of Borghees, Dornick, Hüthum, Klein-Netterden, Praest and Vrasselt were integrated into the city of Emmerich on 1 July 1969. In the course of the 2nd restructuring program, the municipality of Elten was integrated as well, on 1 January 1975.

== Population ==
Historical population

Year	Pop.	±% p.a.
1965	26,413	—
1970	28,117	+1.26%
1975	29,113	+0.70%
1980	29,343	+0.16%
1985	29,245	−0.07%
1990	28,322	−0.64%
1995	29,285	+0.67%

Year	Pop.	±% p.a.
2000	28,899	−0.27%
2005	29,520	+0.43%
2010	29,571	+0.03%
2015	30,968	+0.93%
2020	30,869	−0.06%
2025	31,736	+0.56%

Source: Landesdatabank Nordrhein-Westfalen

== Places of interest ==
Emmerich's Rhine promenade is a popular spot for locals and visitors alike, offering views across the Rhine river and Emmerich's iconic Rhine Bridge. Having undergone a complete refurbishment between 2003 - 2007, the 1 km long promenade also boasts restaurants, coffee shops and the Rheinpark at the end at the promenade with its playground, and war memorial.

The Geistmarkt is located in close proximity to the Rhine Promenade and hosts Emmerich's Farmer's Market every Wednesday and Saturday, where shoppers can purchase fresh produce ranging from vegetables, fruits, fresh fish, meat, antipasti as well as flowers. It also hosts an annual fair and traditional marksmen's parades.

Running adjacent to the Rhine Promenade, the Steinstraße is Emmerich's main shopping mile, boasting a number of shops. Recent refurbishments have also opened up opportunities for new business ventures that are looking for a new HQ. Shoppers who are looking for additional shops and eateries can explore the Kaßstraße, which is a 5 minute walk from the Steinstraße.

In the Rhine Museum, 130 ship models are exhibited, as well as a radar unit, examples of fish taxidermy, maps of the Rhine, a historic Christophorus figurine and a library of the city's history. In addition, there is a Biber submarine, a one-man U-boat from World War II and exhibitions regarding shipping on the Rhine, the history of the city and fisheries.

PAN-Art Forum/Poster Museum. The famous poster collection is displayed in the former Lohmann chocolate factory in rotating exhibits. The collection is growing from donations from private and public institutions. It also houses the Jewish Cultural Space.

Aviation fans and adrenaline junkies are encouraged to visit Emmerich's aero glider club 'Aero Club Emmerich e.V.'.

The Holy Ghost Catholic Church was built in 1966 and is especially striking due to its version of the cross made of scrap metal and the Stations of the Cross made of linen. The architectural development during the time of the Second Vatican Council shaped the design of the church.

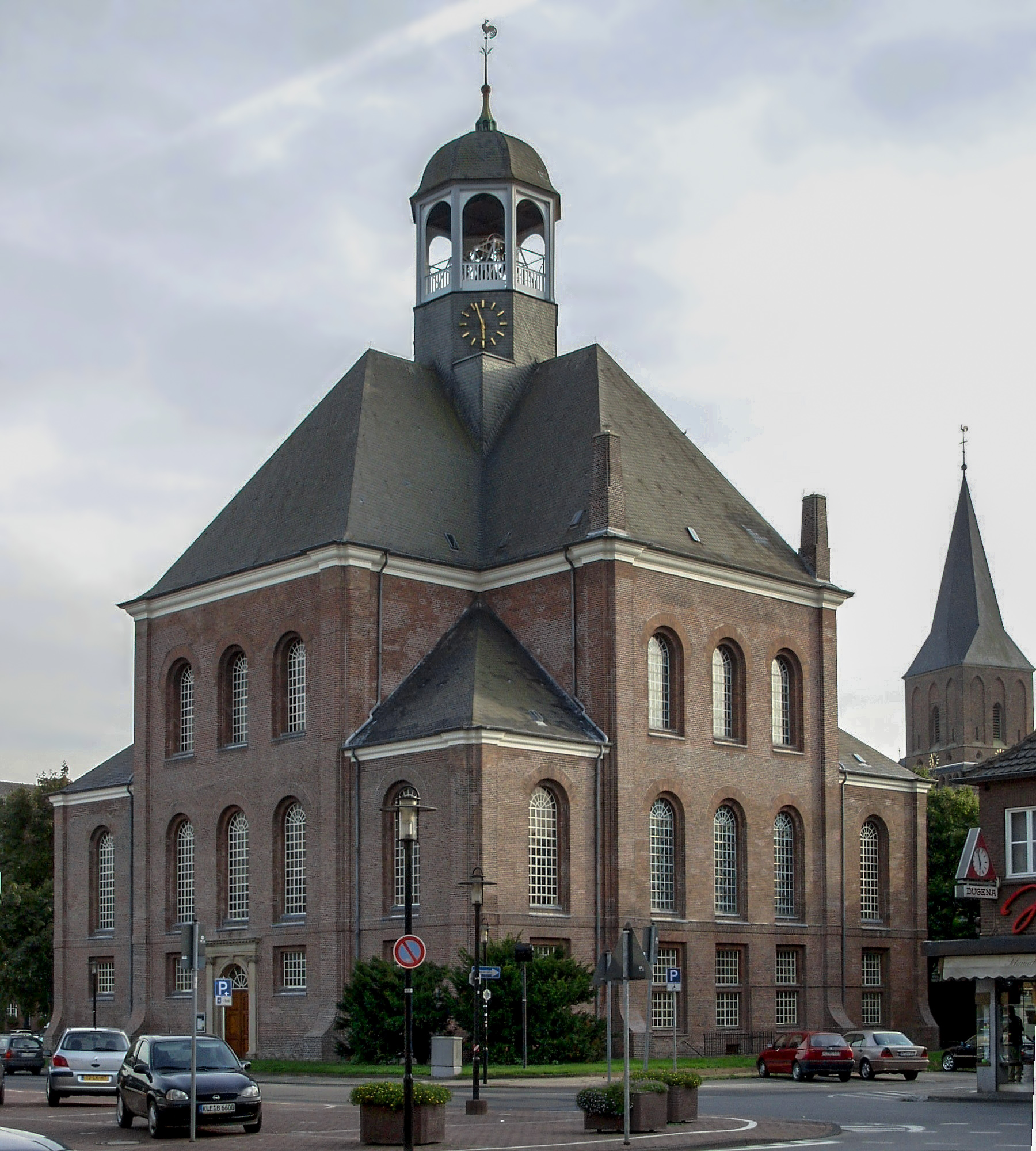
Christuskirche

The Rhine Bridge, which connects Emmerich on the north of the Rhine with Kleve on the south, was opened in 1965, and with a span of 1,228 meters it is the longest suspension bridge in Germany. Approximately 500 ships pass underneath it every day.

The Castle Borghees, or manor house Borghees, is used as a cultural center and was expanded in its present form in the mid-18th century. Castle Borghees became historically well known due to a love affair of the 17-year-old Katharina Rickers, the later imperial countess of Wartenberg, with the Prussian king Friedrich I.

== Transport ==
=== Railways ===
Austrian Nightjet train to Wien Hbf passes Emmerich pulled by a lokomotive of the dutch Nederlandse Spoorwegen

Emmerich station is located about 1 km southeast of the city center on the double-track electrified "Holland Route," which plays an important role in passenger travel and commercial transport and is therefore treated in the EU as a part of the Trans-European Network in the category "priority projects which should be begun before 2010." In addition to the ICE International from Amsterdam to Frankfurt am Main, the night train CityNightLine to southern Germany, Austria and to Switzerland travels through here with a stop in Emmerich.

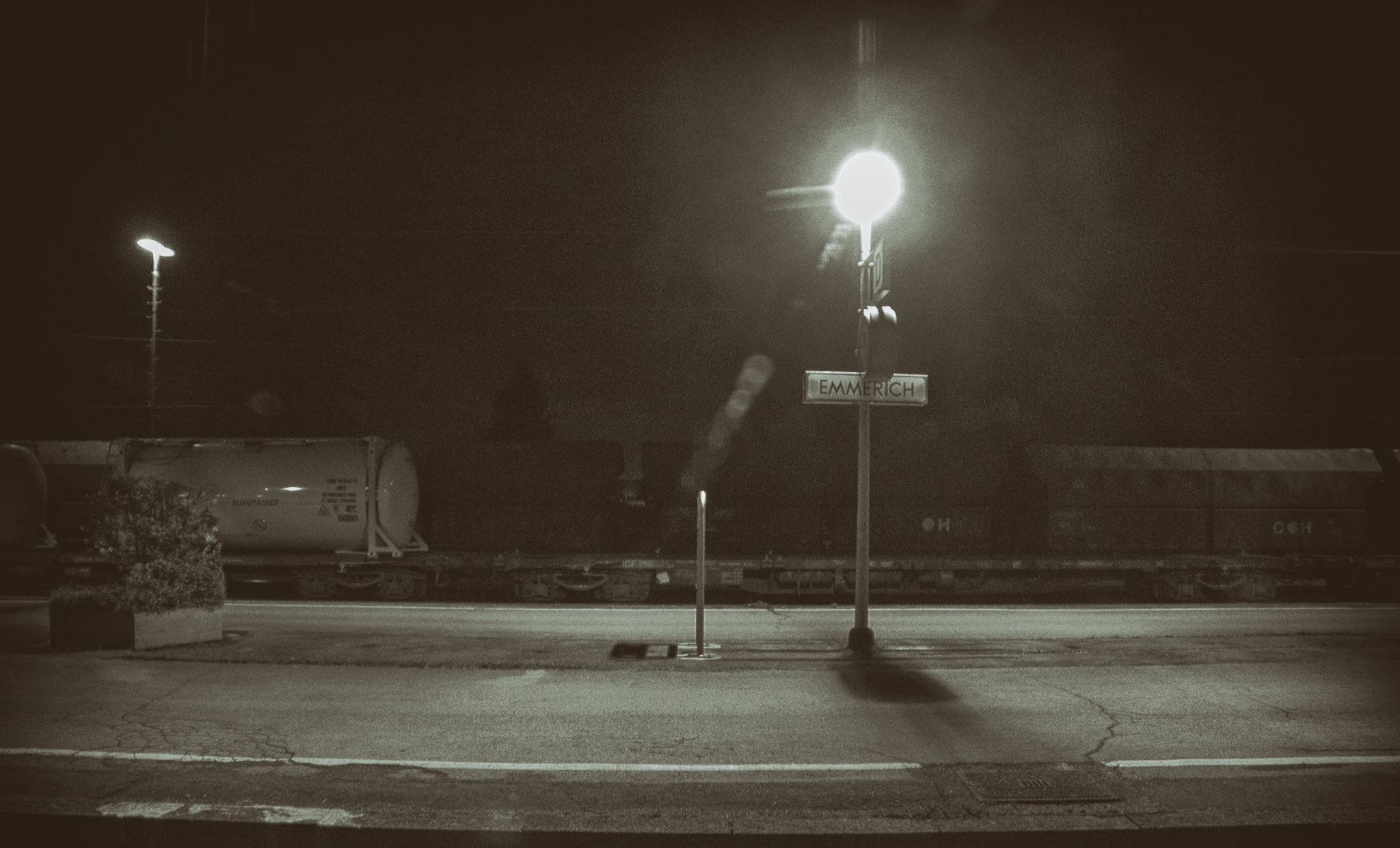
Emmerich Train Depot

With regards to regional rail transport, the following trains pass through Emmerich, in general every hour:

- the Rhein-Express (RE5) from Emmerich to Koblenz and
- the Regional Train Der Weseler (RB35) from Emmerich to Duisburg, and at rush hour to Düsseldorf.

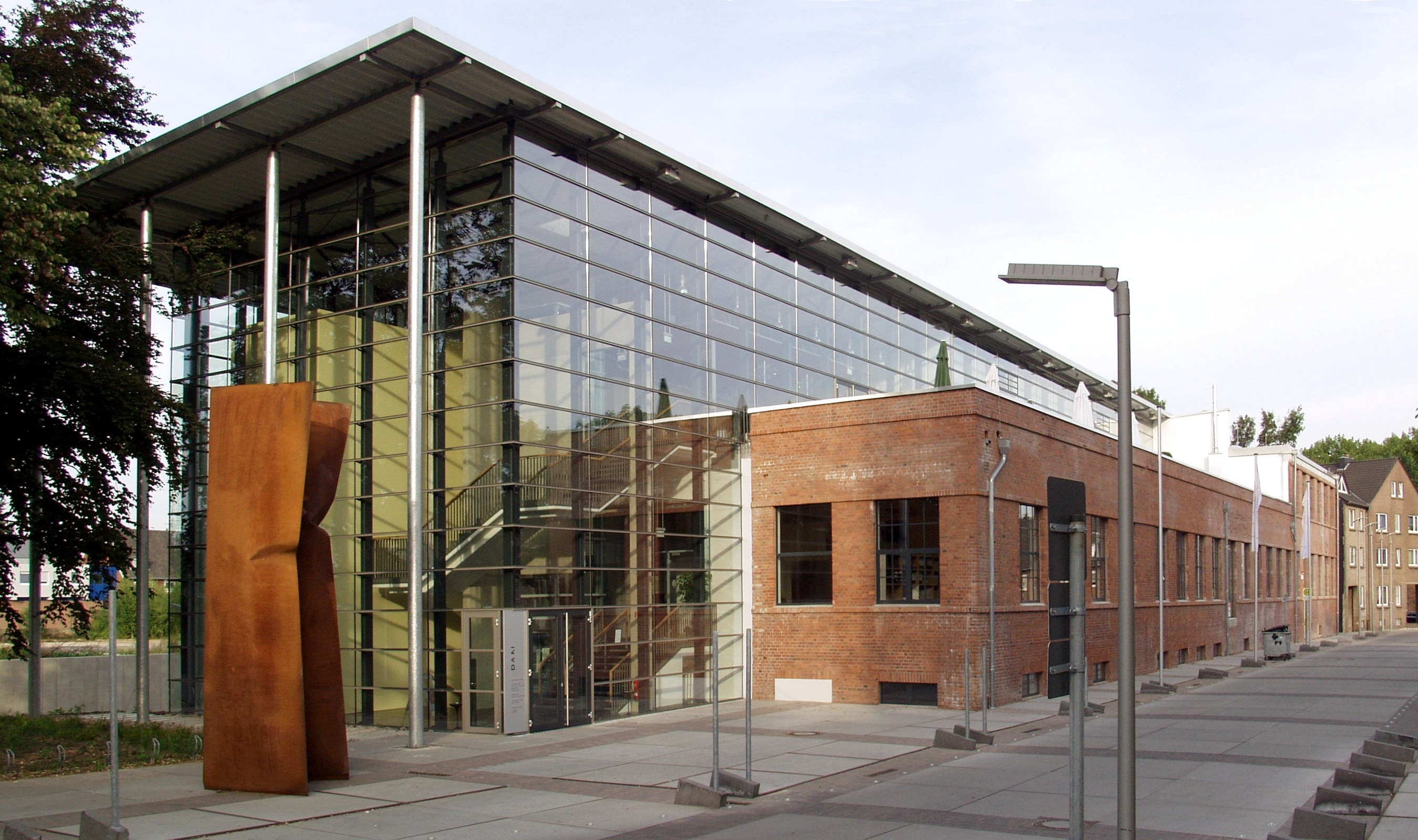
PAN-Forum (poster museum)

There is another station located on the same line near Emmerich, the stop Praest, which is only served by the Regional Train Der Weseler (RB 35).

=== Roads ===
Emmerich lies on the A3 motorway (known in German as the Bundesautobahn 3), which has the European designation E35. It also lies on the B8 (the Bundesstrasse 8) and the B220.

=== Inland waterways ===
- The Rhine
- The Municipal Rhine Harbour of Emmerich

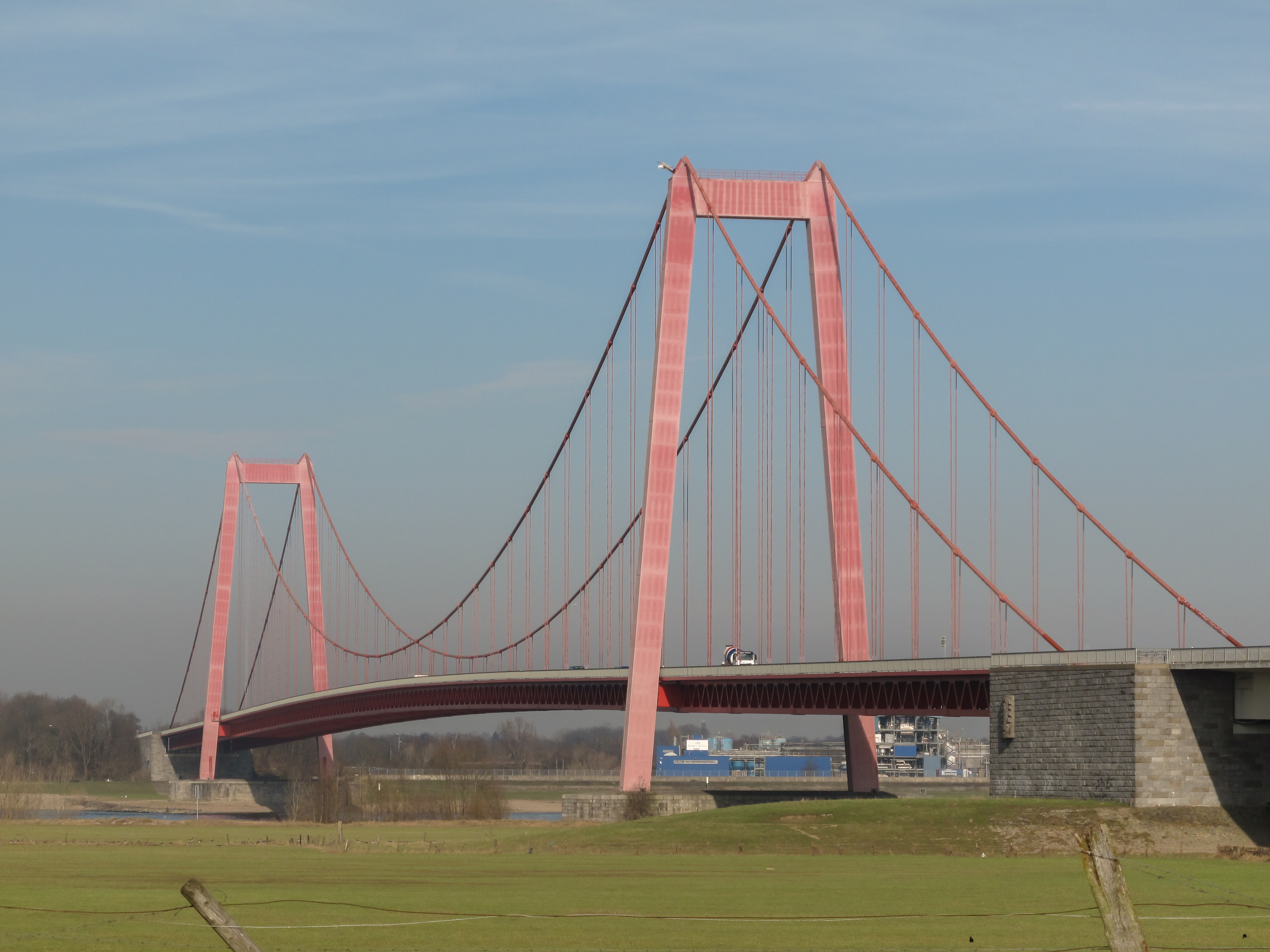
Emmerich am Rhein, bridge across the Rhine

== Notable people ==
- Wilhelm Normann, the inventor of fat hardening by hydrogenation
- Albrecht Wolters (1822–1878), German Protestant theologian
- Anton de Waal (1837–1917), German Catholic priest, prelate, historian and author
- Friedrich Wilhelm Franz Nippold (1838–1918), German Protestant theologian
- Ernst Heinrich Göring (1839–1913), German jurist, Reichkommissar for German South-West Africa, father of the national socialist politician Hermann Göring
- Ernst Diehl (1874–1947), German classical philologist and epigraph
- Karl Scheele (1884–1966), German surgeon
- Eugen Reintjes (1884–1966), promotion of sport and health, Eugen Reintjes Stadion
- Eduard Künneke (1885–1953), German operetta composer
- Werner Müller (1907–1990), German ethnologist
- Ernst van Aaken (1910–1984), German sports physician and coach
- Gottfried Wolters (1910–1989), composer and choral leader
- Rainer Bonhof (born 1952), former Dutch-German footballer for the German national team
- Ulrich Surau (born 1952), German footballer
- Alexander Müller (born 1979), German racing driver
- Nico Hülkenberg (born 1987), Current Formula 1 driver for Audi with car number 27, 2015 24 Hours of Le Mans winner and 2009 GP2 champion
- Robin Gosens (born 1994), German footballer

== Twin towns – sister cities ==
Emmerich am Rhein is twinned with:

- King's Lynn, England, United Kingdom (1978)
- Šilutė, Lithuania (1990)
- Kirkland, Washington, United States (1995)
