= Karl Schwarz =

German Protestant theologian (1812–1885)

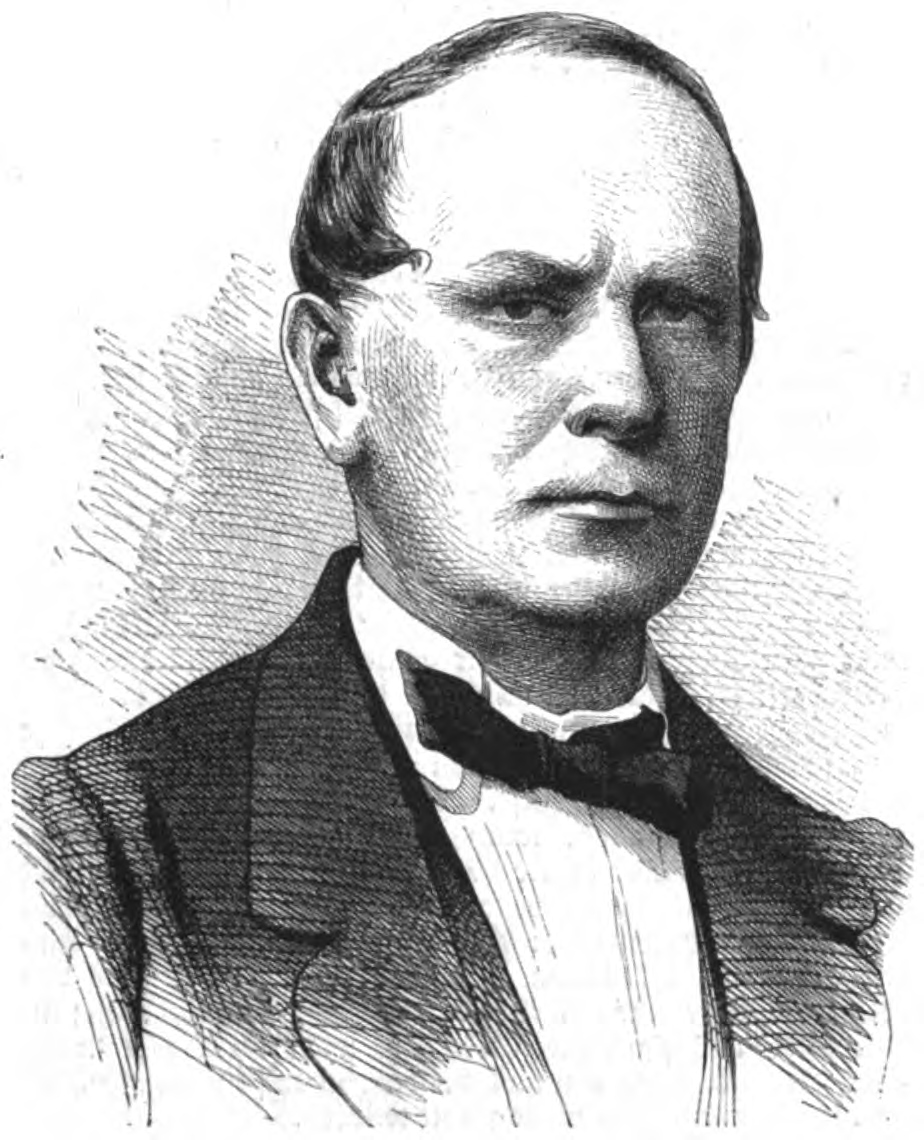
- Karl Schwarz, in: Illustrirte Zeitung, Bd. 45 (1865), S. 8.
- Born: November 19, 1812
- Died: March 25, 1885 (aged 72)
- Education: University of Bonn; Humboldt University of Berlin

Karl Schwarz (19 November 1812 – 25 March 1885) was a German Protestant theologian.

== Life ==
=== Birth and early life ===
He was born at Wiek, Rügen. His father, Theodor Schwarz, pastor at Wiek, was well known as a preacher, and as the writer of a number of popular works (parables, romances, etc.) under the pseudonym "Theodor Melas".

=== University studies ===
Karl Schwarz studied theology and philosophy at Halle, and afterwards at Bonn (1831) and Berlin (1832–1834). At Berlin he came under the influence of Schleiermacher and G. W. F. Hegel, whose influences are seen in his work Das Wesen der Religion (1847). In 1837 he was imprisoned for six months on account of his advanced political opinions. After his release he helped (from 1838) with the Hallische Jahrbücher.

=== Later life and distinctions ===
From 1843 to 1845, he lectured at Halle, and was then suspended by the government. In 1849, however, he was appointed professor extraordinarius, and later received a number of distinctions (in 1858 chief court preacher, etc.). Schwarz took an important part in the founding and directing of the German Protestantenverein and became an eminent exponent of liberal theology. His work Zur Geschichte der neuesten Theologie (1856, 4th edition 1869) is a valuable source for the history of theology in Germany. His other works include Lessing als Theologe (1854) and Grundriss der christlichen Lehre (1873, 5th edition 1876). In his memory, a Karl-Schwarz-Stiftung was founded in connection with the theological faculty at the University of Jena.
