= Gustav Frank =

German-Austrian Protestant theologian

Gustav Wilhelm Frank (25 September 1832, in Schleiz – 24 September 1904, in Hinterbrühl) was a German-Austrian Protestant theologian, known as the author of a multi-volume work on the history of Protestant theology.

He studied theology at the University of Jena, where his influences included Karl von Hase. In 1859 he obtained his habilitation, and in 1864 became an associate professor at Jena. In 1867 he was appointed a full professor of systematic theology at the University of Vienna. In 1867 he also became a member of the Austrian Protestant Church Council.

In his work, he was concerned with dogmatic-historical issues. He was a representative of philosophical rationalism, and as such, an opponent of religious Supranaturalism.

== Selected works ==
He was the author of numerous articles in the Allgemeine Deutsche Biographie, that included biographies of religious academics such as: Karl von Hase, August Tholuck, Julius Wegscheider and Karl Gottlieb Bretschneider. Other works by Frank are:

- Die Jenaische Theologie, (1858) – Jena theology.
- Religionsphilosophie (main author Ernst Friedrich Apelt, edited by Gustav Frank, 1860) – Philosophy of religion.
- Geschichte der protestantischen Theologie (4 volumes, 1862–1905) – History of Protestant theology.
  - Volume 1: Von Luther bis Johann Gerhard (1862) – From Martin Luther to Johann Gerhard.
  - Volume 2: Von Georg Calixt bis zur Wolff’schen Philosophie (1865) – From Georg Calixtus to Wolffianism.
  - Volume 3: Geschichte des Rationalismus und seiner Gegensätze (1875) – History of Rationalism and its opposites.
  - Volume 4: Die Theologie des neunzehnten Jahrhunderts (1905, by George Loesche) – Theology of the nineteenth century.
- Die k. k. evangelisch-theologische Facultät in Wien von ihrer Gründung bis zur Gegenwart, 1871 – The royal evangelical-theological faculty in Vienna from its foundation to the present.
- Das Toleranzpatent des Kaisers Joseph II, 1882 – The Patent of Toleration by Joseph II.
