= Johann Heinrich Callenberg =

German theologian (1694–1760)

Johann Heinrich Callenberg (January 12, 1694 – July 11, 1760) was a German Orientalist, Lutheran professor of theology and philology, and promoter of conversion attempts among Jews and Muslims.

== Life ==
Callenberg was born in Molschleben and attended school in Gotha. Beginning in 1715 he studied philology and theology at the University of Halle. Sometime before 1720 Salomon Negri, professor of Syriac and Arabic at Rome, stayed in Halle for six months. Callenberg studied Arabic under him. Besides Arabic, Callenberg also studied Persian and Turkish.

From his youth he cherished the idea of working for the conversion of the Muslims in the Middle East, Russia and Tartary, but later he devoted himself to missionary work among the Jews. In 1728 he established the Institutum Judaicum, the first German Protestant mission to the Jews. He also set up a printing-office. In this office he printed the Gospel and other Christian books in the Judæo-German dialect, and distributed them among the Jews, with the assistance of the Jewish physician Dr. Heinrich Christian Immanuel Frommann. Frommann translated the Gospel of Luke with commentary which was revised and reprinted by Raphael Biesenthal in the 19th century.

Callenberg also sent missionaries to other European countries. One of his students was Johann Salomo Semler. He was a patron of converted Jews. His plans for the conversion of Muslims were resumed somewhat later, but in these he utterly failed.

From 1730 onwards, the Institutum Judaicum sent out more than 20 missionaries and existed until 1791.

In 1727 Callenberg was appointed extraordinary professor of theology at the University of Halle, and in 1735 professor of philology.

In 1733, Callenburg married Beata Amalia Gasser, the daughter of a law professor at Halle.

He died, aged 66, at Halle.

== Works ==
Among the works Callenberg published are the following:

- Berichte von einem Versuch das Jiidische Volk zur Erkeisntniss des Christlichen anzuleiten (3 vols. 8vo), 1726
- Luris circa Christianos Muhammedici particulae. E codicibus Moslemorum (Laws concerning Christians from the Muslim manuscripts), 1726
- Prima rudivuenta linguse arabicx, Halle, 1729
- De Conversione Muhammedanorum ad Christum expetita tentataque, 1733
- Kurtze Anleitung zur jüdischteutschen Sprache ertheilet von Joh. Heinrich Callenberg. Halle, 1733 (Digitized by Leo Baeck Institute, New York)
- Scriptores de reliçione duhammedica, 1734
- Jüdisches Markus-Evangelium (Jewish Gospel of Mark), 1736
- Spécimen bibliolhecx arabicx, 1736
- Pauli apostoli epistola ad Romanos arabice (The Epistle of Paul the Apostle to the Romans in Arabic), 1741
- Arabic translations of the New Testament, The Imitation of Christ (abridged), Luther's Catechism, etc.
- Jüdischteutsches Wörterbüchlein (Little Jewish-German Dictionary)

== Sources ==
- Werner Raupp (Ed.): Mission in Quellentexten. Geschichte der Deutschen Evangelischen Mission von der Reformation bis zur Weltmissionskonferenz Edinburgh 1910, Erlangen/Bad Liebenzell 1990 (ISBN 3-87214-238-0 / 3-88002-424-3), p. 218-228 (= 18th century: Mission among Jews).
