= August Tholuck =

German theologian (1799–1877)

The Reverend August Tholuck
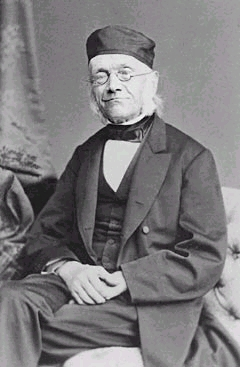
- Born: Friedrich August Gotttreu Tholuck; 10 March 1799; Breslau, Prussia, Holy Roman Empire
- Died: 10 June 1877 (aged 78); Halle, Province of Saxony, Prussia, German Empire
- Education: University of Breslau
- Occupations: Pastor, theologian, historian
- Theological work
- Main interests: Apologetics, 1700s Christian history

Friedrich August Gotttreu Tholuck (30 March 1799 – 10 June 1877), known as August Tholuck, was a German Protestant theologian, pastor, and historian.

== Biography ==
Tholuck was born at Breslau and educated at the gymnasium and university there. He distinguished himself by his ability to learn languages. A love of Oriental languages and literature led him to exchange the University of Breslau for that of Berlin, in order to study to greater advantage, and there he was received into the house of the Orientalist Heinrich Friedrich von Diez. He was introduced to pietistic circles in Berlin, and came under the influence of Baron Hans Ernst von Kottwitz, who became his "spiritual father," and of the historian Neander. Before deciding on the career of theological professor, he had in view that of a missionary in the East. Meanwhile, he was feeling the influence to a certain degree of the romantic school, and of Schleiermacher and G. W. F. Hegel too, though he never sounded the depths of their systems.

At length, in his twenty-first year, he finally decided to adopt the academical calling. In 1821 he was Privatdozent and in 1823 became professor extraordinarius of theology in Berlin, though he was at the same time active in the work of home and foreign missions. He lectured on the Old and New Testaments, theology, apologetics and the history of the church in the 18th century. In 1821 he published his first work, Sufismus, sive theosophia Persarum pantheistica. In 1825, with the aid of the Prussian government, he visited the libraries of England and the Netherlands, and on his return was appointed (in 1826) professor ordinarius of theology at the University of Halle, the centre of German rationalism, where he afterwards became preacher and member of the supreme consistorial council of the Evangelical State Church in Prussia. Here he made it his aim to combine in a higher unity the learning and to some extent the rationalism of Johann Salomo Semler with the devout and active pietism of A H Francke; and, in spite of the opposition of the theological faculty of the university, he succeeded in changing the character of its theology.

This he achieved partly by his lectures, but above all by his personal influence on the students, and, after 1833, by his preaching. His theological position was orthodox, but laid more stress upon Christian experience than upon rigid dogmatic belief. On the two great questions of miracles and inspiration he made great concessions to modern criticism and philosophy. His lifelong battle was on behalf of personal religious experience, in opposition to the externality of rationalism, orthodoxy or sacramentarianism. Karl Schwarz happily remarks that, as the English apologists of the 18th century were themselves infected with the poison of the deists whom they endeavoured to refute, so Tholuck absorbed some of the heresies of the rationalists whom he tried to overthrow. He was also one of the prominent members of the Evangelical Alliance, and few men were more widely known or more beloved throughout the Protestant churches of Europe and America than him. He died at Halle. As a preacher, Tholuck ranked among the foremost of his time. As a teacher, he showed remarkable sympathy and won great success. As a thinker he can hardly be said to have been endowed with great creative power.

In 1864, he was elected as a member to the American Philosophical Society.

== Publications ==
In 1821 appeared his first work, Sufismus, sive theosophia Persarum pantheistica; following the same line of study he published Blütensammlung aus der morgenlandischen Mystik (1825) and Speculative Trinitätslehre des späteren Orients (1826). His well-known essay on the nature and moral influence of heathenism (1822) was published by Neander, with high commendation, in his Denkwürdigkeiten; and his Commentary on the Epistle to the Romans (1824) secured him a foremost place amongst the most suggestive, if not the most accurate, Biblical interpreters of that time.

Another work, soon translated into all the principal European languages, Die wahre Weihe des Zweiflers (1823), the outcome of his own religious history, obtained for him the permanent position of the modern Pietistic apologist of Evangelical Christianity.

He also wrote several commentaries (on Romans, the Gospel of John and the Sermon on the Mount). He also wrote several volumes of sermons. His best-known books are Stunden christlicher Andacht (1839; 8th ed., 1870), intended to take the place of J H D Zschokke's standard rationalistic work with the same title, and his reply to David Strauss's Life of Jesus (Glaubwürdigkeit der evangelischen Geschichte, 1837).

He published at various times valuable contributions towards a history of rationalism - Vorgeschichte des Rationalismus (1853–1862), Geschichte des Rationalismus (1865), and a number of essays connected with the history of theology and especially of apologetics. His views on inspiration were indicated in his work Die Propheten und ihre Weissagungen (1860), in his essay on the "Alte Inspirationslehre," in Deutsche Zeitschrift für christliche Wissenschaft (1850), and in his Gespräche über die vornehmsten Glaubensfragen der Zeit (1846; 2nd ed., 1867).

He also contributed many articles to Herzog's Realencyklopädie, and for several years edited a journal (1830–1849), Literarischer Anzeiger.

He also wrote several hymns, including ‘A day will dawn when from on high’.

== Family ==
Tholuck was married, but little is known of his family.

== Legacy ==
Tholuck had an international influence. Philip Schaff says, "Next to Neander, no German divine of the present century is more extensively known in the Protestant churches of ... America than Dr. Frederick Augustus Tholuck." In the nineteenth century, many of his books were translated into English. His popular works, such as his sermons, were also translated. American scholars were especially interested in his biblical commentaries. Several Americans, like Charles Hodge and Edward Robinson, studied with Tholuck in Halle.

== Sources ==
- This work in turn cites:
  - Leopold Witte, Das Leben d. Friedrich August Gotttreu Tholuck's (2 vols, 1884–1886).
  - Martin Kähler, August Tholuck... ein Lebensabriss (1877).
  - Martin Kähler, "Tholuck" in Herzog's Realenzyklopädie für protestantische Theologie und Kirche.
  - Carl Siegfried, "Zur Erinnerung an Tholuck" in Protestantische Kirchzeitung, 1885, No. 45, and 1886, No. 47.
  - Karl Schwarz, Zur Geschichte der neuesten Theologie (4th ed., 1869).
  - F. W. F. Nippold, Handbuch der neuesten Kirchengeschichte
  - Philip Schaff, Germany; its Universities, Theology and Religion (1857)
  - Gustav Frank (1894). "Tholuck, August" . Allgemeine Deutsche Biographie (in German). Vol. 38. Leipzig: Duncker & Humblot. pp. 55–59.
- Geck, Albrecht, "Friendship in Faith. E.B. Pusey (1800–1882) und F.A.G. Tholuck (1799–1877) im Kampf gegen Rationalismus und Pantheismus - Schlaglichter auf eine englisch-deutsche Korrespondenz," in: Pietismus und Neuzeit 27 (2001), 91-117.
- Geck, Albrecht, "Pusey, Tholuck and the Oxford Movement," in: Stewart J. Brown/Peter B. Nockles (ed.), The Oxford Movement. Europe and the Wider World 1830-1930, Cambridge (Cambridge University Press) 2012, 168–184.
- Geck, Albrecht (ed.), "Authorität und Glaube. Edward Bouverie Pusey und Friedrich August Gottreu Tholuck im Briefwechsel (1825–1865)." Teil 1-3: in: Zeitschrift für Neuere Theologiegeschichte 10 (2003), 253–317; 12 (2005), 89-155; 13 (2006), 41-124.
