= Hans Ernst von Kottwitz =

German Philanthropist

Hans Ernst von Kottwitz (1 September 1757 – 13 May 1843) was a German Pietist and philanthropist. He was born in Tschepplau, near Glogau, Silesia, and he died in Berlin.

Information on Kottwitz's life is largely derived from a handful of letters and biographies of other individuals, and events prior to 1807 (when he settled in Berlin) are at best sketchy.

He was educated in Breslau, and later served as a page in the court of Frederick II. He travelled extensively through several German states, and in Silesia, is credited with establishing factories and institutions based on his personal ideals in an effort to alleviate poverty.

In 1782 he married Helene Charlotte; they had four children.

In 1807 he moved to Berlin at a time when the working classes were ravaged by consequences of the Napoleonic Wars. Here he developed institutions similar to those in Silesia, and also helped provide free housing for families of working men. In addition, he conducted religious services, and eventually became an acknowledged leader of Pietism in Berlin. The costs of these philanthropic activities were largely financed by Kottwitz, and in 1823, economic circumstances forced him to relinquish his foundations over to the city of Berlin.

In Berlin, he had many influential friends that included theologians August Neander, Ernst Wilhelm Hengstenberg, Friedrich Tholuck, Richard Rothe, et al.
