= Gottfried Wolters =

German choral conductor and composer (1910-1989)

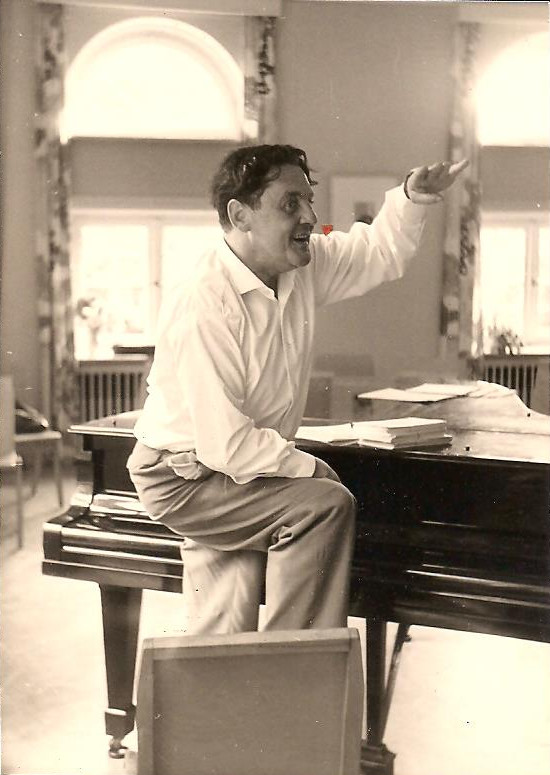
Gottfried Wolters as singing teacher

Gottfried Wolters (8 April 1910 – 25 June 1989) was a German choral conductor and composer.

== Life ==
Wolters was born in Emmerich am Rhein. He began studying music at the University of Cologne, but did not complete his dissertation on Johann Baptist Wanhal as a symphonist. After the seizure of control by the National Socialists he worked as an editor at P. J. Tonger Verlag in Cologne and also as a freelance composer and choir director. On the Tag der nationalen Arbeit (Day of national work) (1 May 1933), he became a member of the NSDAP and registered under the Party Number 2,227,516. However he was dropped in 1934, because he had missed the monthly registration. Since 1934 he appeared as a composer of Hitlerjugend anthems and songs. As Gaumusikreferent of the German Labour Front he was already active as a single conductor during the late 1930s and early 1940s.

In World War II, he was drafted into the Kriegsmarine. His songbook published together with Hugo Wolfram Schmidt Uns geht die Sonne nicht unter. Eine Auswahl der meistgesungenen Lieder der Jugend (1935) was listed on the List of literature to be excluded in the Soviet occupation zone.

In the post-war years he founded the Norddeutscher Singkreis, a mixed choir, in Hamburg. With this choir he led Bach's St John Passion and St Matthew Passion, Hugo Distler's Choralpassion and Mörike's Chorliederbuch, Günter Bialas's Im Anfang and many more serious modern and Baroque works. His special love was the German and later the European folk song, which he sang together with his choir and the audience with his own instrumental movements at the monthly Open Singstunden in Hamburg. Worldly music from madrigal to vocal music by Paul Hindemith was another focus. In the early 1960s he founded the movement Europa Cantat with other European choral conductors and had active connections with the French choral movement À Cœur Joie and the choir leader César Geoffray.

He organized numerous training courses and singing weekends and became leader of the Arbeitskreis Musik in der Jugend (AMJ). He was editor for the Karl Heinrich Möseler Verlag in Wolfenbüttel and published the songleaf series Das Singende Jahr. Later, followed the multi-volume work Ars Musica Volume I-V with many choral movements and monophonic folk songs, as well as the Chorbuch Romantik.

His compositional work comprises monophonic and polyphonic, mostly secular songs. There are several recordings of his performances. Wolters also prepared folksong programmes for radio with the choir. He also developed St. John Passion with the concert audience by rehearsing the chorale together in advance so that everyone could sing along to the performance. In addition to his intensive choral work, his goal was to bring people in Western and Eastern Europe together through travel and great singing meetings.

Wolters died in Emmerich at age 79.
