= Theodor Schwarz (theologian) =

Theodor Schwarz (1 September 1777 in Wiek, Rügen, Swedish Pomerania – 10 February 1850, in Wiek, Prussian Pomerania) was a German Lutheran clergyman and writer. He published novels under the pseudonym Theodor Melas. He was the son of provost Georg Theodor Schwarz.

From 1798 he studied at the University of Jena, where he attended lectures given by Johann Gottlieb Fichte, Friedrich Wilhelm Joseph Schelling, Johann Jakob Griesbach and Friedrich Schiller. In 1800 he traveled with painter Jakob Wilhelm Roux to Saxon Switzerland and to Dresden, where he met with Caspar David Friedrich. In 1801 he returned to Rügen and assisted his father at the parish. Afterwards, he worked for several years as a tutor in Skåne and Stockholm, and after the death of his father in 1814, took over the elder Schwarz's duties at the parish. In 1834 he received his doctorate in theology.

He was the father of theologian Karl Schwarz (1812–1885).

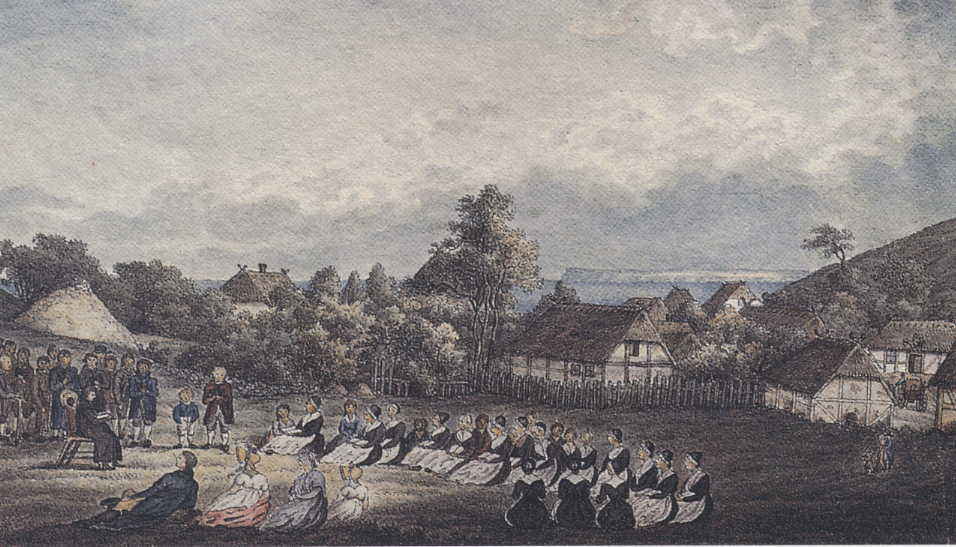
Uferpredigt bei Vitt ("Shore preaching at Vitt") a watercolor by Theodor Schwarz

== Selected writings ==
- Verschiedene Ansichten des Christenthums : ein Gespräch, 1819 – Different views of Christianity; a conversation.
- Ludewig von Zollern : ein Roman, 1821 – Ludewig von Zollern, a novel.
- Erwin von Steinbach; ein Roman (3 volumes, 1834) – Erwin von Steinbach, a novel.
- Ueber religiose Erziehung, 1834 – On religious education.
- Joseph Sannazar : eine Novelle, 1837 – Joseph Sannazar, a novel.
- Hymnen an den Tod, 1839 – Hymns to death.
- Der Pantheist : ein episches Idyll, 1846 – The Pantheist, an epic idyll.
- Der warnende Hausgeist : eine schwedische Prediger-Idylle, 1846 – The warning house-spirit: a Swedish preacher's idyll.
