= Friedrich Wilhelm Franz Nippold =

German Protestant theologian

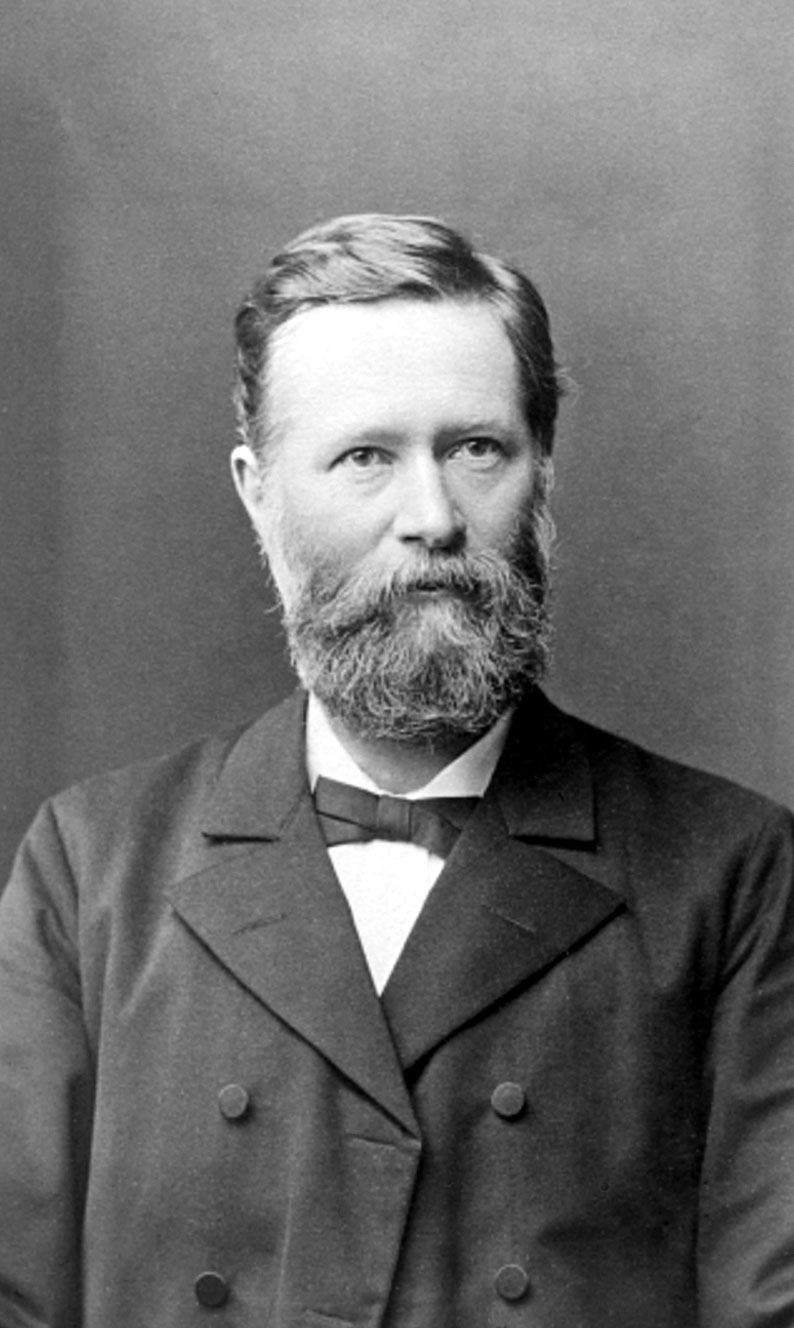
Friedrich Wilhelm Franz Nippold

Friedrich Wilhelm Franz Nippold (15 September 1838 – 4 August 1918) was a German Protestant theologian born in Emmerich am Rhein.

In 1865 he received his habilitation at the University of Heidelberg, where in 1867 he became an associate professor. From 1871 to 1884, he was a professor of church history at the University of Bern, afterwards moving to Jena, as a successor to Karl von Hase. In 1907 he took his retirement in Oberursel, where he died on 4 August 1918.

Nippold's primary interest involved modern church history, and he was associated with a number of current church policy concerns. He was co-founder of the Evangelischer Bund (Protestant Federation), a movement for preservation of German Protestant interests.

== Written works ==
He was a prolific author, his best work being the highly acclaimed, multi-volume "Handbuch der neuesten Kirchengeschichte" (Textbook of the latest church history). He also published a collection of his lectures, sermons and essays called "Zur geschichtlichen Würdigung der Religion Jesu" (The historical assessment of the religion of Jesus), and a new edition of Karl Rudolf Hagenbach's "Vorlesungen über die Kirchengeschichte des Mittelalters" (Lectures on church history of the Middle Ages). Other publications of Nippold include:

- Welche Wege führen nach Rom? (Which road leads to Rome?), 1870.
- Die altkatholische Kirche des Erzbistums Utrecht (The Old Catholic Church of the Archdiocese of Utrecht), 1872.
- Richard Rothe, ein christliches Lebensbild (Richard Rothe, a Christian biography), 1872–73, two volumes.
- Die römisch-katholische Kirche im Königreich der Niederlande (The Roman Catholic Church in the Kingdom of the Netherlands), 1877.
- Die Theorie der Trennung von Kirche und Staat (The theory of separation of church and state) 1881.
- Der Entwickelungsgang des Lebens Jesu im Wortlaut der drei ersten Evangelien (The history of the life of Jesus in the text of the first three Gospels), 1895.
