= Protestantenverein =

The Protestantenverein (German: Allgemeiner Deutscher Protestantenverein or Deutscher Protestantenverein, DPV) was a society in Germany the general object of which was to promote the union (Verein) and progress of the various Protestant established Churches of the country in harmony with the advance of culture and on the basis of Christianity.

It was founded at Frankfurt am Main in 1863 by a number of distinguished clergymen and laymen of liberal tendencies, representing the freer parties of the Lutheran and Reformed Churches of the various German states, amongst whom were the statesmen Bluntschli and von Bennigsen and the professors Richard Rothe, Heinrich Ewald, D. Schenkel, A. Hilgenfeld and F. Hitzig.

The more special objects of the association are the following: the development of the Churches on the basis of a representative parochial and synodal system of government in which the laity shall enjoy their full rights; the promotion of a federation of all the Churches in one national Church; resistance to all hierarchical tendencies both within and without the Protestant Churches; the promotion of Christian toleration and mutual respect amongst the various confessions; the rousing and nurture of the Christian life and of all Christian works necessary for the moral strength and prosperity of the nation. These objects include opposition to the claims of Rome and to autocratic interference with the Church on the part of either political or ecclesiastical authorities, efforts to induce the laity to claim and exercise their privileges as members of the Church, the assertion of the right of the clergy, laity and both lay and clerical professors to search for and proclaim freely the truth in independence of the creeds and the letter of Scripture.

Membership in the association is open to all Germans who are Protestants and declare their willingness to co-operate in promoting its objects. The means used to promote these objects are mainly (I) the formation of local branch associations throughout the country, the duty of which is by lectures, meetings and the distribution of suitable literature to make known and advocate its principles, and (2) the holding of great annual or biennial meetings of the whole association, at which its objects and principles are expounded and applied to the circumstances of the Church at the moment. The theses accepted by the general meetings of the association as the result of the discussions on the papers read indicate the theological position of its members.

The following may serve as illustrations: The creeds of the Protestant Church shut the doors on the past only, but open them for advance in the future; it is immoral and contrary to true Protestantism to require subscription to them. The limits of the freedom of teaching are not prescribed by the letter of Scripture, but a fundamental requirement of Protestantism is free inquiry in and about the Scriptures. The attempt to limit the freedom of theological inquiry and teaching in the universities is a violation of the vital principle of Protestantism. Only such conceptions of the person of Jesus can satisfy the religious necessities of this age as fully recognise the idea of his humanity and place in history. The higher reason only has unconditional authority, and the Bible must justify itself before its tribunal; we find the history of divine revelation and its fulfilment in the Bible alone, and reason bids us regard the Bible as the only authority and canon in matters of religious belief.

The formation of the association at once provoked fierce and determined opposition on the part of the orthodox sections of the Church, particularly in Berlin. Attempts more or less successful have been made from the first to exclude clergymen and professors identified with it from the pulpits and chairs of Berlin and elsewhere, though membership in it involves no legal disqualification for either. One of the objects of the association was to some extent obtained by their organisation of the Evangelical State Church in Prussia when Dr Falk was Prussian cultus minister, on the basis of parochial and synodal representation, which came into full operation in 1879. But the election for the general synod turned out very unfavourable to the liberal party, and the large orthodox majority endeavoured to use their power against the principles and the members of the association.

In 1882 the position of the association was rendered still more difficult by the agitation in Berlin of Dr Kalthoff and other members of it in favour of a people's church on purely dissenting and extremely advanced theological principles. This difficulty has continued, and the extreme rationalist position taken up by some leaders has alienated the sympathy not only of the obscurantists but of those who were prepared to go some distance in the direction of a liberal theology. There are now about 25,000 members in the 20 branches of the Verein.

See D. Schenkel, Der deutsche Protestantenverein und seine Bedeutung für die Gegenwart (Wiesbaden, 1868, 2nd ed. 1871); Der deutsche Protestantenverein in seinen Statuten und den Thesen seiner Hauptversammiungen 1865-1882 (Berlin, 1883); P. Wehlhorn in Herzog-Haucks Realencyklopädie für protestantische Theologie und Kirche; H. Weinel, "Religious Life and Thought in Germany Today", Hibbert Journal (July 1909).
