= Augustin Gretillat =

Swiss Protestant theologian

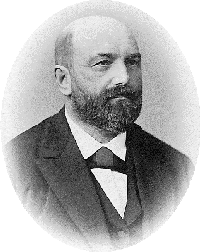

Personal life
- Born: 16 March 1837 Fontainemelon
- Died: 14 January 1894 Neuchâtel

Religious life
- Religion: Christianity

Augustin Gretillat (French: [oɡystɛ̃ ɡʁətija]; March 16, 1837 at Fontainemelon – January 14, 1894 in Neuchâtel) was a Swiss Protestant pastor, theologian and professor of theology. He is the author of a “Systematic Theology”, of which four volumes appeared from 1885 to 1892, and he left unfinished a treatise on Christian morality which was to consist of three volumes. He succeeds John Calvin and Bénédict Pictet in the very short list of authors of complete treatises on dogmatic in the French language.

== Biography ==
He studied theology in Neuchâtel, Halle, Göttingen and Tübingen. He was ordained in 1859 by Frédéric Godet. He was a deacon in La Chaux-de-Fonds from 1860 to 1862. He was a pastor at Couvet from 1862 to 1870. He has been a professor of systematic theology at the University of Neuchâtel since 1870, and then at the Faculty of the Independent Church of 1873 to 1894. He was Chaplain of the Landeron from 1870 to 1894. He was a contributor to the Revue de théologie et de philosophie and foreign journals, including the Revue de théologie de Montauban, Theological Journal (London) and the Presbyterian and Reformed Review (Philadelphia).

== Theology ==
=== Critic of predestination ===
Although he was both reformed and evangelical, Augustin Gretillat was nonetheless a vigorous critic of double predestination. Not only did he join in the great Reformed theologians like Philippe Mélanchthon, Moïse Amyrault or Jacobus Arminius, but he also took up the positions of the majority of the non-liberal Reformed theologians of his time, starting with by his teacher Frédéric Godet. On this subject, Gretillat writes for example in his Systematic Theology:

The doctrine of predestination has presented the most strange and contradictory phenomena over the centuries. Considered in itself, in its motives and in its conclusions, it was the most daring challenge to reason and human conscience; an aberration of the Christian genius to which it will always be astonishing that the cause of divine truth could have survived on earth. And this doctrine, which made God a liar and the author of sin, has not less marked the great awakenings and the great regenerations of the Church.

In this regard, neo-calvinist Henri Blocher notes that Gretillat leaned toward Arminianism:

Augustin Gretillat, the last author close to orthodoxy who left a Systematic Theology in French, strongly affirms his Arminianism: the particular predestination is conditional, "relative to the acts of the human will"; "This human conditionality, in fact, is realized in two opposite alternatives, both precognized and not predetermined, which are designated in Scripture by the terms of faith and unbelief."

=== Assessment and legacy ===
With regard to his main work in systematic theology (1885-1892), his friend, the writer Philippe Godet states:

The value [of] the lessons [of Gretillat] can be measured by the great work that has produced. The exposition of Systematic Theology, of which four volumes were published from 1885 to 1892, was to be completed by three volumes of morality; at the moment of his death he had just finished the first. This vast monument, conceived according to a completely personal plan, is the first complete treatise of dogmatics which has appeared in French since Calvin, or at least since the Christian Theology of Benedict Pictet (1708).

== Publications ==
=== Books ===
- Gretillat, Augustin (2018). Étude sur J.-J Rousseau (in French). Paris: ThéoTeX Éditions.
- Gretillat, Augustin (2013). Théologie Systématique - Méthodologie (in French). Vol. 1. Paris: ThéoTeX Éditions.
- Gretillat, Augustin (2013). Théologie Systématique - Apologétique et Canonique (in French). Vol. 2. Paris: ThéoTeX Éditions.
- Gretillat, Augustin (2012). Théologie Systématique - Prolégomènes et Cosmologie (in French). Vol. 3. Paris: ThéoTeX Éditions.
- Gretillat, Augustin (2011). Théologie Systématique - Sotériologie et Eschatologie (in French). Vol. 4. Paris: ThéoTeX Éditions.
- Gretillat, Augustin (2010). Théologie Systématique - Éthique chrétienne (in French). Vol. 5, 6. Paris: ThéoTeX Éditions.
- Gretillat, Augustin; Godet, Philippe (1894). "Jérémie et son temps". Études et Mélanges (in French). Neuchatel: A. G. Berthoud.
- Gretillat, Augustin; Godet, Philippe (1894). "Étude sur Pascal". Études et Mélanges (in French). Neuchatel: A. G. Berthoud.
- Godet, Frédéric; Gretillat, Augustin; Monvert, Charles; de Coulon, Paul; Bovet, Félix (1898). La Bible annotée : Ancien Testament (in French). Neuchâtel: Attinger Frères.
- Gretillat, Augustin (1879). La peine de mort est-elle légitime? : Réponse à M. Le Colonel Philippin (in French). Neuchatel: Sandoz.
- Gretillat, Augustin (1879). "Socialisme et Evangile [Mémoire]". Actes de la Société pastorale suisse (in French).
- Gretillat, Augustin (1874). Théologie biblique [cours de Mr. Gretillat] (in French). [Neuchâtel]: [n. c.]
- Gretillat, Augustin. Compte rendu [de l'ouvrage intitutlé:] Le Problème de l'Immoralité par E[mmanuel] Pétavel-Olliff (in French). OCLC 78487069.

=== Articles, sermons and conferences ===
- Gretillat, Augustin (1890). "Religious Life in Switzerland". Theological Monthly. 20. London.
- Gretillat, Augustin (1884). Foi et parole : discours de consécration prononcé à Neuchâtel le 29 octobre 1884 (in French). Neuchatel: Libr. A.-G. Berthoud..
- Gretillat, Augustin (1882). "Nouvel essai d'interprétation de l'oracle d'Emmanuel". Revue de théologie et philosophie (in French).
- Gretillat, Augustin (1882). "Pascal et les Jésuites". Chrétien évangélique (in French).
- Gretillat, Augustin (1881). "la Théorie du sacrifice lévitique d'après Baehr et Œhler". Revue de théologie et philosophie (in French).
- Gretillat, Augustin (1881). "De l'autorité en matière religieuse, ses critères et sus droits". Chrétien évangélique (in French).
- Gretillat, Augustin (1880). "Plan de la théologie dans l'ensemble des sciences". Chrétien évangélique (in French).
- Gretillat, Augustin (1879). "Examen de la cérémonie de la ratification du vœu du baptême, telle qu'elle est pratiquée dans nos églises [2 articles]". Chrétien évangélique (in French)..
- Gretillat, Augustin (1878). "J.-J. Rousseau [3 articles]". Chrétien évangélique (in French).
- Gretillat, Augustin (1878). "les Citations de l'Ancien Testament dans les deux premiers chapitres de saint Matthieu". Revue de théologie (in French). Montauban.
- Gretillat, Augustin (1873). Conférence sur la révision de la loi ecclésiastique dans le canton de Neuchâtel : tenue à Couvet, à Neuchâtel et au Locle en février et mars 1873 (in French). Neuchatel: Libr. générale Jules Sandoz.
- Gretillat, Augustin (1870). "Critique de l'analyse métaphysique [de M. Alaux]". Revue chrétienne (in French).
- Gretillat, Augustin (1861). La lutte de Jacob : sermon sur Genèse XXXII, 24-31, prononcé au Locle le 7 octobre 1860 (in French). Neuchatel: Impr. Courvoisier.

== Notes and references ==
=== Sources ===
- Aubert, Louis (1919). Catalogue de la bibliothèque de la Société des Pasteurs et Ministres Neuchatelois (in French). Vol. 2. Neuchâtel: Delachaux et Niestlé.
- H. V. (1894). "Augustin Gretillat". Revue de Théologie et de Philosophie et Compte-rendu des Principales Publications Scientifiques (in French). 27. Librairie Droz: 103. JSTOR 44347399.
- Gretillat, Augustin (1888). Théologie Systématique - Prolégomènes et Cosmologie (in French). Vol. 3. Neuchâtel: Fischbacher.
- Blocher, Henri (1977). "Souveraineté de Dieu et décision humaine". Ichthus (in French). 71.
- Gretillat, Augustin; Godet, Philippe (1894). Études et Mélanges. Avec une notice par P. Godet, etc (in French). Neuchatel: A. G. Berthoud.
- Lichtenberger, Frédéric (1882). Encyclopédie des sciences religieuses (in French). Vol. 13. Paris: Librairie Fischbacher.
