= Wilhelm Gass =

German theologian

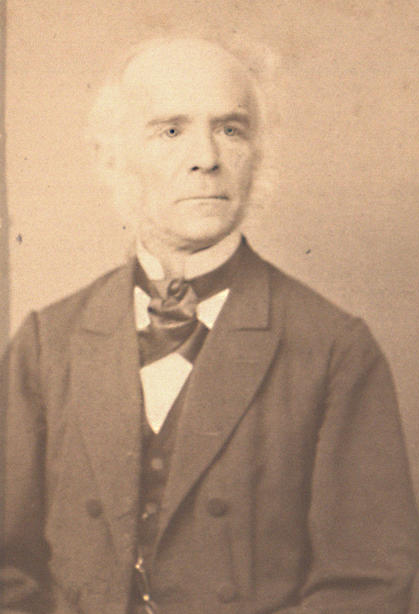
Wilhelm Gass (1813-1889)

Friedrich Wilhelm Joachim Heinrich Gass (German: Gaß; November 28, 1813 – February 21, 1889) was a German theologian, born in Breslau. He was the son of theologian Joachim Christian Gass (1766–1831) and his wife Wilhelmine.

== Biography ==
He received his education in Breslau, Halle and Berlin, and as a student was influenced by the teachings of August Neander (1789–1850). He gained his PhD in 1837 and in 1846 he became an associate professor at the University of Breslau. During the following year he relocated to Greifswald, where in 1855 he achieved the title of professor ordinarius. In 1862 he was appointed professor of systematic theology at the University of Giessen, and in 1868 moved to the University of Heidelberg as a successor to Richard Rothe (1799–1867). He died in 1889 in Heidelberg.

His theological work largely dealt with the history of Protestant dogmatics, studies of the Greek Orthodox Church during the Middle Ages and the history of Christian ethics.

== Publications ==
Among his more important written works was the four-volume Geschichte der Lutherischen Dogmatik (History of Lutheran Dogmatics 1854-67), and an 1846 book on Georgius Calixtus and syncretism called Georg Calixt und der Synkretismus.

Other noted works include;

- Beiträge zur kirchlichen Litteratur und Dogmengeschichte des griechischen Mittelalters (1844–49, 2 volumes)
- Zur Geschichte der Athosklöster (1865)
- Die Lehre vom Gewissen (1869)
- Symbolik der griechischen Kirche (1872)
- Optimismus und Pessimismus. Der Gang der christlichen Welt- und Lebensansicht (1876)
- Geschichte der Ethik (1881, volume 1)
