= Wolfgang Friedrich Gess =

German Lutheran theologian

Wolfgang Heinrich Christian Friedrich Gess (also spelled Geß) (* 27 July 1819 in Kirchheim unter Teck; † 1 June 1891 in Wernigerode) was a German Lutheran theologian.

== Life ==
Gess was a teacher of theology in Basel from 1850 to 1864. After that, he became Professor of Systematic Theology in Göttingen, moving to Breslau in 1871. In 1880, he succeeded the deceased general superintendent of the Old Prussian, Friedrich Cranz (1809–1878), in Posen. He headed the Church province of Posen until 1885, at which point he had to retire due to heart issues. He was succeeded by Johannes Hesekiel, and settled down in Wernigerode.

He was the father of historian Felician Gess (1861–1938).

== Theology ==
Gess is known as the main representative of Kenosis. His main work was The Scripture Doctrine of the Person of Christ. (1878–1887). Rejecting the Chalcedonian Definition, he sees Christ's incarnation as a transition from the state of being "self-positing" to the state of "being posited". At conception, Logos was united with the body of Jesus, instead of God creating a human soul, as he does with other men. The Logos reduced himself to what was compatible with existence as a human soul. Controversially, Gess thinks that the humanity of Jesus required him to allow his self-consciousness to be extinguished at birth, only to begin to flash through at a certain stage of his physical maturity, and then developing with the goal of sanctification, which is achieved step by step in the choices he freely makes. Furthermore, Gess argues that a change took place in the Trinity for the duration of the incarnate Logos' earthly life. The Son no longer proceeds from the Father, and the Spirit proceeds from the Father alone, rather than from the Father and the Son.

== Works ==
- Die Lehre von der Person Christi (The Doctrine of the Person of Christ, 1856)
- Christi Person und Werk I-III (Christ's Person and Work, 1870–77)
