= Institutum Judaicum =

The Institutum Judaicum was a special academic course for Protestant theologians who desired to prepare themselves for missionary work among the Jews.

The first of its kind was founded at the University of Halle, by Professor Callenberg in 1724. The great interest which Franz Delitzsch took in the conversion of the Jews to Christianity prompted him to establish a similar course at the University of Leipzig in 1886, and another was founded by Prof. Hermann L. Strack in Berlin the same year. The institutes of Leipzig and Berlin have courses in New Testament theology with reference to the Messianic passages in the Old Testament, and they also give instruction in rabbinic literature; they further publish works helpful to their cause, as biographies of famous converts, controversial pamphlets, autobiographies of converted Jews, and occasionally scientific tracts. The Berlin institute has published Strack's "Introduction to the Talmud," his editions of some tractates of the Mishnah, and a monograph on the blood accusation. A special feature of its publications is the New Testament in Hebrew and Yiddish translations.

After the death of Strack, the Institutum Judaicum lessened its missionary drive and shifted its focus to research on post-biblical Judaism. Under pressure by Jewish scholars, research was contextualized under the aim of understanding Christian-Jewish relations in the wake of 20th century anti-Semitism and the consequences of World War II.
