= Richard Rothe =

German Lutheran theologian (1799–1867)

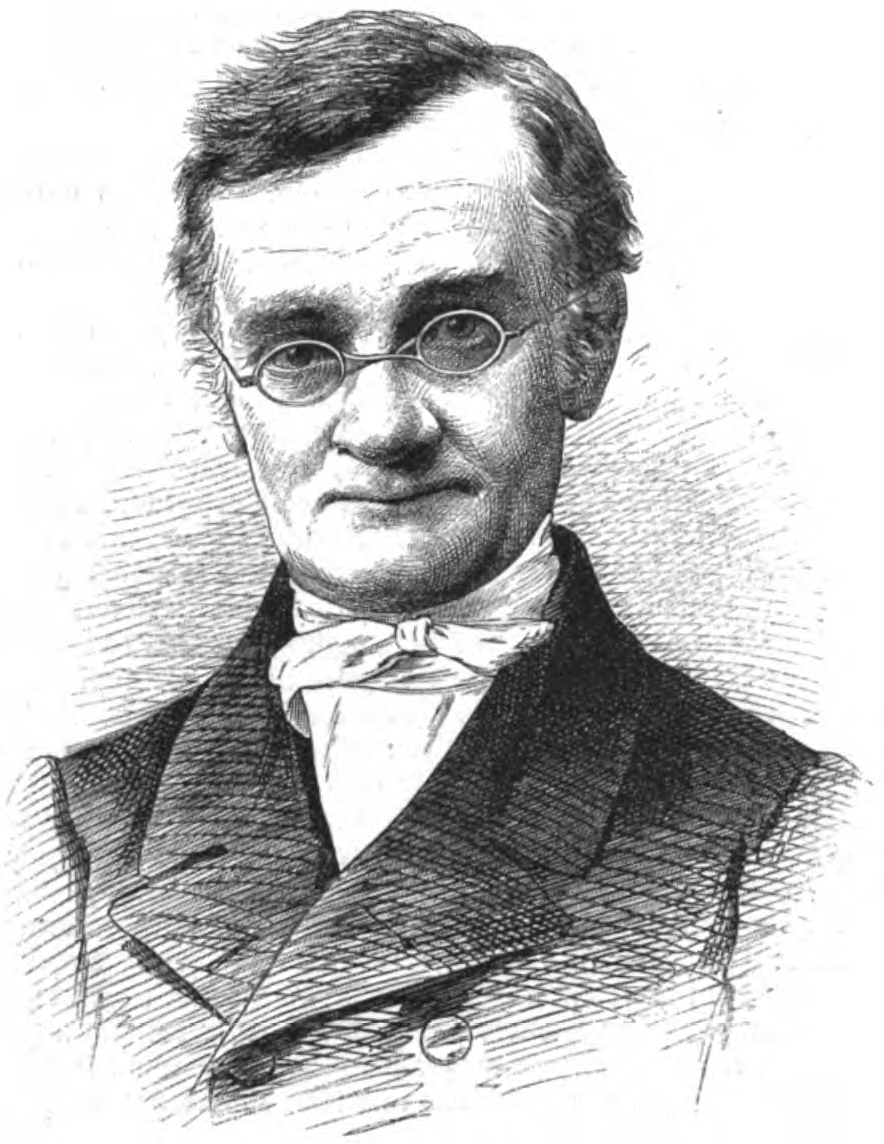
Richard Rothe

Richard Rothe (28 January 1799 – 20 August 1867) was a German Lutheran theologian.

== Biography ==
Richard Rothe was born in Posen, then part of Prussia. He studied theology in the universities of Heidelberg and Berlin (1817–20) under Karl Daub, Schleiermacher and Neander, the philosophers and historians G. W. F. Hegel, Friedrich Creuzer and F. C. Schlosser exercising a considerable influence in shaping his thought. From 1820 to 1822 he was in the clerical seminary in Wittenberg. In the autumn of 1823 he was appointed chaplain to the Kingdom of Prussia embassy in Rome, of which Baron Bunsen was the head. This post he exchanged in 1828 for a professorship in the Wittenberg theological seminary, of which in 1832 he became also second director and ephorus, and hence in 1837 he removed to Heidelberg as professor and director of a new clerical seminary; in 1849 he accepted an invitation to Bonn as professor and university preacher, but in 1854 he returned to Heidelberg as professor of theology, and afterwards became a member of the Oberkirchenrath, a position he held until his death. He died in Heidelberg.

== Theology ==
As a youth Rothe had a bent towards a supernatural mysticism; his chosen authors were those of the romantic school, and Novalis remained throughout his life a special favourite. In Berlin and Wittenberg he came under the influence of Pietism as represented by such men as Rudolf Stier and Friedrich Tholuck, though Tholuck pronounced him a "very modern Christian." He afterwards confessed that, though he had been a sincere Pietist, he was never a happy one. In Rome, under the broadening influence of classical and ecclesiastical art, he learned to look at Christianity in its human and universalistic aspects, and began to develop his great idea, the inseparable relation of religion and morals. He began then, and particularly after the revolution of July 1830, likewise to give a more definite form to his peculiar view of the relations of church and state. He thus became out of harmony with the pietistic thought and life of Wittenberg. His removal to Heidelberg and the publication of his first important work, Die Anfänge der christlichen Kirche und ihrer Verfassung (1837), coincide with the attainment of the principal theological positions with which his name is associated. During the middle period of his career (1837–61) he led the life of a scholastic recluse. During the last six years of his life he came forward as the advocate of a free theology and of the Protestantenverein.

Rothe was one of the most profound and influential of modern German theologians. Like Schleiermacher he combined with the keenest logical faculty an intensely religious spirit, while his philosophical tendencies were in sympathy rather with Hegel than with Schleiermacher, and theosophic mysticism was more congenial to him than the abstractions of Spinoza, to whom Schleiermacher owed so much. He classed himself among the theosophists, and claimed to be a convinced and happy supernaturalist in a scientific age. His system, though it may seem to contain doubtful or even fantastic elements, is in its general outlines a noble massive whole, constructed by a profound, comprehensive, fearless and logical mind. A peculiarity of his thought was the realistic nature of his spiritualism: his abstractions are all real existences; his spiritual entities are real and corporeal; his truth is actual being. Hence Rothe, unlike Schleiermacher, lays great stress, for instance, on the personality of God, on the reality of the worlds of good and evil spirits, and on the visible second coming of Christ. Hence his religious feeling and theological speculation demanded their realization in a kingdom of God coextensive with man's nature, terrestrial history and human society.

=== Theologische Ethik ===
Rothe's theological system became a Theologische Ethik, as he entitled one of his books (3 vols., 1845-1848). It is on this work that Rothe's permanent reputation as a theologian and ethical writer rests. The first edition remained twelve years out of print before the second (5 vols., 1867–71) appeared. It was the author's purpose to rewrite the whole, but he died when he had completed the first two volumes. The remainder was reprinted from the first edition by Heinrich Julius Holtzmann, with the addition of some notes and emendations left by the author.

The Theologische Ethik begins with a general sketch of the author's system of speculative theology in its two divisions, theology proper and cosmology, cosmology falling into the two subdivisions of Physik (the world of nature) and Ethik (the world of spirit). It is the last subdivision with which the body of the work is occupied. After an analysis of the religious consciousness, which yields the doctrine of an absolute personal and spiritual God, Rothe proceeds to deduce from his idea of God the process and history of creative development, which is eternally proceeding and bringing forth, as its unending purpose, worlds of spirits, partially self-creative and sharing the absolute personality of the Creator.

Rothe regards the natural man as the consummation of the development of physical nature, and obtains spirit as the personal attainment, with divine help, of those beings in whom the further creative process of moral development is carried on. His theory leaves the natural man, without hesitation, to be developed by the natural processes of animal evolution. The attainment of the higher stage of development is the moral and religious vocation of man; this higher stage is self-determination, the performance of every human function as a voluntary and intelligent agent, or as a person, having as its cosmical effect the subjection of all material to spiritual existences. This personal process of spiritualization is the continuation of the eternal divine work of creation. Thus the moral life and the religious life coincide, and when normal are identical; both have the same aim and are occupied with the same task, the accomplishment of the spiritualization of the world. "Piety, that it may become truth and reality, demands morality as its fulfilment, as the only concrete element in which the idea of fellowship with God is realized; morality, that it may find its perfect unfolding, requires the aid of piety, in the light of which alone it can comprehend its own idea in all its breadth and depth."

The process of human development Rothe regards as necessarily taking an abnormal form and passing through the phase of sin. This abnormal condition necessitates a fresh creative act, that of salvation, which was, however, from the first, part of the divine plan. As a preparation for this salvation supernatural revelation was required for the purifying and revivification of the religious consciousness, and the Saviour Himself had to appear in human history as a fresh miraculous creation, born of a woman but not begotten by a man. In consequence of His supernatural birth the Saviour, or the second Adam, was free from original sin. By His own moral and religious development He made possible a relation of perfect fellowship between God and man, which was the new and highest stage of the divine creation of mankind. This stage of development inaugurated by the Saviour is attained by means of His kingdom or the community of salvation, which is both moral and religious, and in the first instance and temporarily only religious - that is, a church. As men reach the full development of their nature, and appropriate the perfection of the Saviour, the separation between the religious and the moral life will vanish, and the Christian state, as the highest sphere of human life representing all human functions, will displace the church. "In proportion as the Saviour Christianizes the state by means of the church must the progressive completion of the structure of the church prove the cause of its abolition." The decline of the church is therefore not to be deplored, but recognized as the consequence of the independence and completeness of the Christian life. It is the third section of his work - the Pflichtenlehre - which is generally most highly valued, and where his full strength as an ethical thinker is displayed, without any mixture of theosophic speculation.

=== Other works ===
Since Rothe's death several volumes of his sermons and of his lectures (on dogmatics, the history of homiletics) and a collection of brief essays and religious meditations under the title of Stille Stunden (Wittenberg, 1872) have been published. Jane Stoddart's translation of his work was called Still Hours when it was published in 1886. Several of his lecture notes were published after his death.

== See also ==
- Wilhelm Gass
