= Fellbach =

- Town
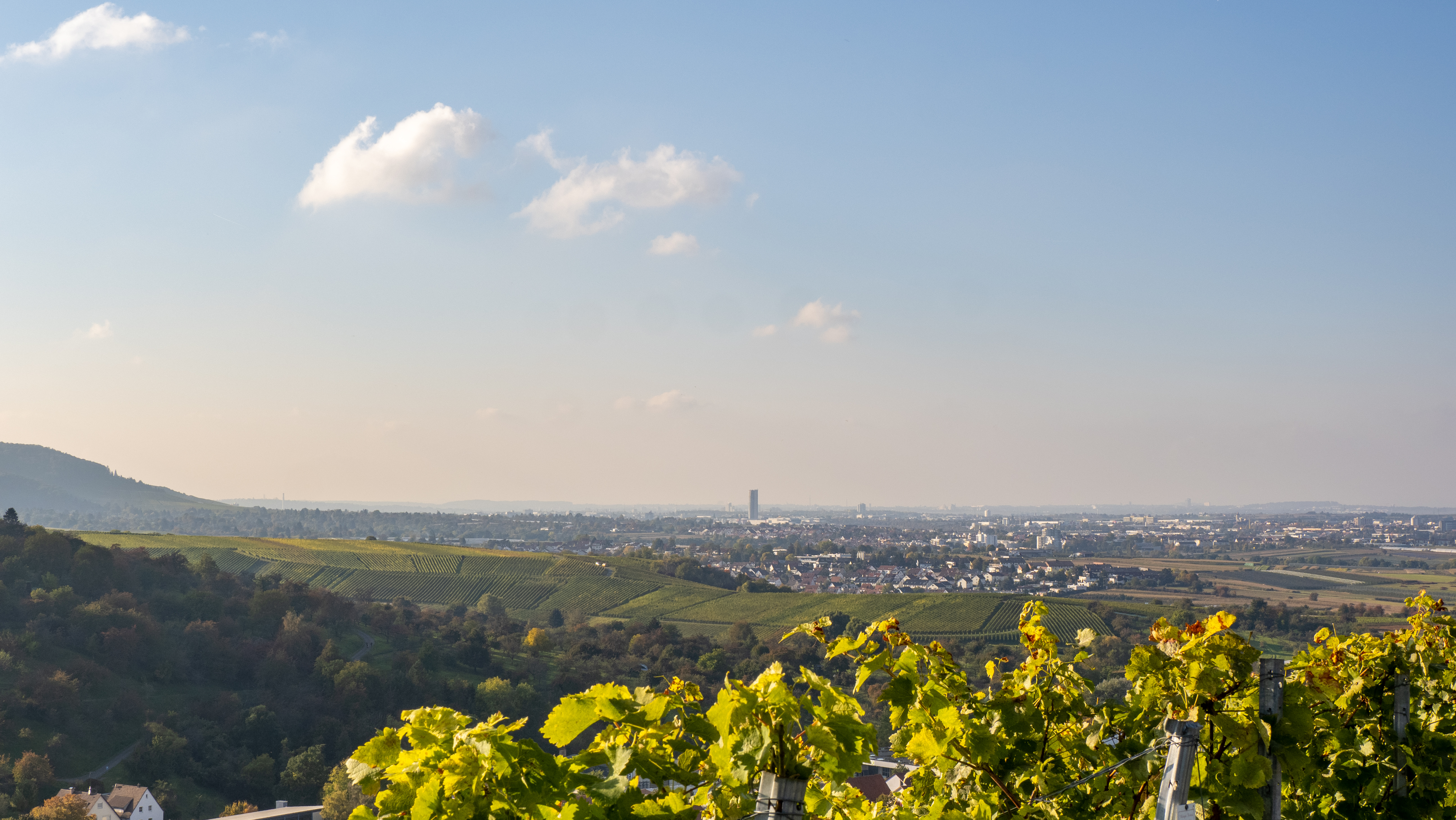

- Flag Coat of arms

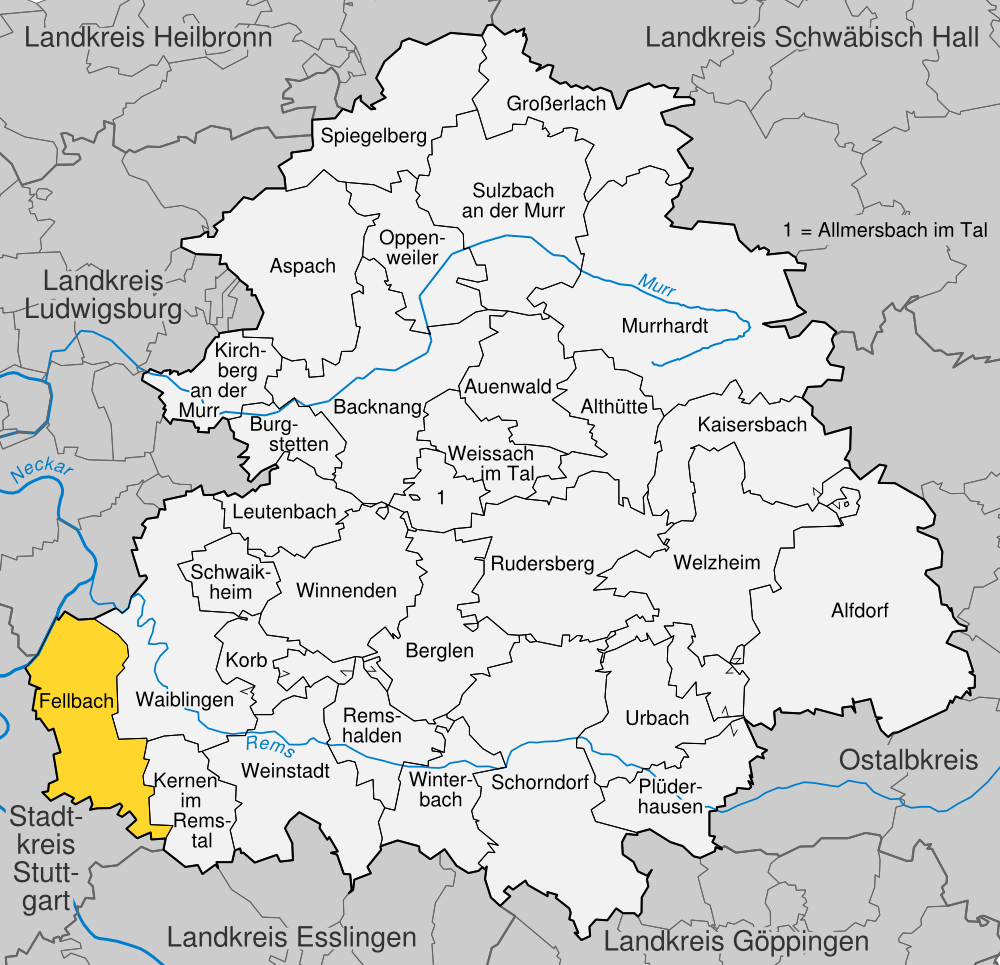
- Location of Fellbach within Rems-Murr-Kreis district
- Interactive map of Fellbach
- Location within Germany Location within Baden-Württemberg
- Coordinates: 48°48′31″N 09°16′33″E
- Country: Germany
- State: Baden-Württemberg
- Admin. region: Stuttgart
- District: Rems-Murr-Kreis
- Subdivisions: Kernstadt and 2 Stadtteile

Government
  - Mayor (2016–24): Gabriele Zull (Ind.)

Area
  - Total: 27.71 km^{2} (10.70 sq mi)
- Elevation: 287 m (942 ft)

Population (2025-12-31)
  - Total: 46,659
  - Density: 1,684/km^{2} (4,361/sq mi)
- Time zone: UTC+01:00 (CET)
  - Summer (DST): UTC+02:00 (CEST)
- Postal codes: 70701–70736
- Dialling codes: 0711
- Vehicle registration: WN
- Website: www.fellbach.de

Fellbach (German pronunciation: [ˈfɛlbax]) is a town on the north-east edge of Stuttgart in Baden-Württemberg, Germany. With a population of approximately 45.430 as of December 2020 is the second largest town in the District Rems-Murr-Kreis. The area of the town is 27.7 km^{2} (10.7 sq mi).

Fellbach was first mentioned as Velbach in 1121. It was called Vellebach in 1357 and the name Fehlbach was used in around 1800. On 14 October 1933, it was declared a city. After World War II it reached a population of more than 20,000 in 1950 and therefore received the status "Große Kreisstadt".

The town Fellbach was expanded with the former municipality Schmiden on 1 January 1973, and Oeffingen on 1 April 1974.

== Geography ==
=== Geographical location ===
Fellbach is located south of the Neckar basin on a plateau between the Neckar and Rems valley at the northern foothills of the Schurwald. The highest points are the Kappelberg (Baden-Württemberg) (469.0 m) and the Kernen (hill) (513.2 m). The metropolitan area extends north into the so-called "Schmidener Feld".

=== Neighboring communities ===
The following cities and towns adjacent to the city of Fellbach. They are starting clockwise to the east: Waiblingen and Kernen im Remstal (both Rems-Murr-Kreis), Stuttgart (city district) and Remseck am Neckar (district of Ludwigsburg).

=== Constituent ===
The city Fellbach consists of the core city and the two districts Schmiden (incorporated on 1 January 1973 and Oeffingen (incorporatedon 1 April 1974). In the field of Fellbach are five separate villages. For Fellbach owns the city Fellbach and the place Lindle. To Oeffingen includes the place Oeffingen and the homestead Tennhof and to Schmiden the place Schmiden. Furthermore, there are in the urban area Fellbach the dialed villages Erbach, Immenrot and Gretenbach.

== History ==
Fellbach was first mentioned as "Velbach" in 1121. The name "Velebach" appeared in 1357 and "Fehlbach" in 1800. Several landlords had possessions in Fellbach, the House Württemberg bought piece by piece. First, the village belonged to Oberamt Cannstatt. After its dissolution in 1923 Fellbach came to Oberamt Waiblingen, this became in 1938 Waiblingen district. After Fellbach had grown to the largest Württemberg village, the community was named October 14, 1933 for city. After World War II, the population crossed the 20,000 threshold. Therefore, Fellbach was appointed on April 1, 1956, to the district town in the district of Waiblingen.

Schmiden was first mentioned in 1225 as "Smidheim". Schmiden first belonged to Oberamt Waiblingen and only came in 1718 to Oberamt Cannstatt. After its dissolution in 1923 it came again to Oberamt Waiblingen, later district Waiblingen.

Oeffingen was first mentioned in 789 as "Villa Uffingen im Neckargau". Since this did not import the Reformation, Oeffingen remained Catholic. In 1618 Oeffingen was sold to the Chapter Augsburg and came due to the secularisation of 1803 to the Kingdom of Bavaria. The place was finally annexed in 1810 and assigned to Oberamt Cannstatt. After its dissolution in 1923 it came to Oberamt Waiblingen, later district Waiblingen.

== Religions ==
1534 in Württemberg the Reformation was introduced. The present church of the city is the Lutheran Church, which was built mainly in the 15th century. In addition to the Lutheran Church there is the Pauluskirche (built in 1927) and the Melanchthonkirche (built in 1964) and in the neighborhood Lindle the Johannes-Brenz-Kirche. Also in the district Schmiden the Reformation was introduced by Württemberg. In Oeffingen has only existed since 1970 a separate Protestant church and parish. All Protestants of Fellbach belonged initially to the deanery or church district Cannstatt, today to deanery or church district Waiblingen of the Evangelical-Lutheran Church in Württemberg. Catholics: After the Reformation, there were no more Catholics. Only in the 19th century Catholics returned and built in 1923 their own church (St. Johannes). 1967, was built a second church, Maria Regina Kirche. Due to immigration of Catholics was built an own Catholic church (Holy Trinity). Since 1961 Schmiden has its own parish. Oeffingen was a Catholic enclave in Protestant Württemberg. In Oeffingen was an old Catholic church in the outskirts, which was heavily damaged by an air raid during World War II. The present church of Christus König was built 1968. All three parishes of Fellbach are within the deanery Rems-Murr of the Diocese of Rottenburg-Stuttgart. The New Apostolic Church was erected in 1983 with 1,400 seats. In addition to two large churches there are in Fellbach, a Greek Orthodox church and several free churches, among them the United Methodist Church, the Mennonite church and the Seventh-day Adventist Church.

== Incorporations ==
The following municipalities were amalgamated to Fellbach:

- Schmiden (January 1, 1973)
- Oeffingen (April 1, 1974)

== Population development ==
The population figures are estimates, census results (¹) or official updates of the State Statistical Office Baden-Württemberg (only primary residences). Yearly population figures:

Year	Number of residents
1540	ca. 1.000
1803	2.355
1810	2.401
1843	2.813
1861	3.023
1. December 1871	3.181
1. December 1880 ¹	3.512
1. December 1890 ¹	3.816
1. December 1900 ¹	4.300
1. December 1910 ¹	6.780
16. June 1925 ¹	8.500
16. June 1933 ¹	11.291
17. May 1939 ¹	14.988

Year	Number of residents
1946	16.890
13. September 1950 ¹	19.314
6. June 1961 ¹	26.040
27. May 1970 ¹	28.962
31. December 1975	42.501
31. December 1980	41.383
27. May 1987 ¹	39.140
31. December 1990	40.930
31. December 1995	42.554
31. December 2000	42.946
31. December 2005	44.054
31. December 2010	44.665
31. December 2013	44.945

View chart definition.

== Mayor ==
At the head of the municipality of Fellbach was a Schultheiß. Since 1930, the official title is Mayor and since the survey to district town on April 1, 1956, Lord Mayor. The position is directly elected by the electorate for a term of eight years. The officeholder is chairman of the municipal council. The general deputies are: first deputy with the official title of Lord Mayor and second deputy with the official title of Mayor. Community and city leaders since 1800:

- 1800-1845: Philipp Heinrich Friz, bailiff and clerk
- 1845-1849: John Sayler, Schultheiss
- 1850-1877: Jakob Friedrich Lipp, Schultheiss
- 1878-1908: Ernst Albert Friz, Schultheiss
- 1908-1931: Friedrich August Brändle, Schultheiss
- 1932-1937: Max Graser
- 1938-1945: Emil Adelheim
- 1945: Alfons Meyer
- 1945-1948: Heinrich Schnaitmann
- 1948-1966: Max Graser
- 1966-1976: Guntram Palm (FDP)
- 1976-2000: Friedrich-Wilhelm Kiel (FDP)
- 2000-2016: Christoph Palm (CDU)
- since 2016: Gabriele Zull (CDU)

== Crest ==
Current Crest Blazon : "In Red three pole as silver asked wolfsangel " (only the anchor on which the actual wolfsangel were attached). The city flag is white and red. The coat of arms displays the icon of Fellbach local nobility. It was awarded to the city on March 13, 1956, Baden-Württemberg state government.

Old Coat Previously led Fellbach to 1933 a coat of arms, which showed the initial F as a milestone mark of the village Fellbach. Then she received a coat of arms with a blue grape as a symbol of viticulture with the silver F before they took 1956 today's crest.

== Economy and infrastructure ==
Fellbach was before industrialization mainly a wine-growing town. Today 182 hectares of vineyards are cultivated. In the fields around Fellbach, Schmiden and Oeffingen grain and corn are preferably grown. Great importance had once the greenhouses.

The commercial life was marked up until the 1990s by the retail trade. With the structural changes here there was a profound change. Many of the long-established retail stores were closed by competitive pressure and a changing consumer behavior.

Districts developed mainly to commuters living communities. However, there are now also numerous companies, especially in the metal sector.

== Transport ==
The Bundesstraße 14 (Schwäbisch Hall -Stuttgart) led through the city until 1992, then the 1600m long Kappelberg Tunnel was opened. Moreover, Fellbach is tunneled from a second tunnel, which opened in 1997.(Fellbach City Tunnel).

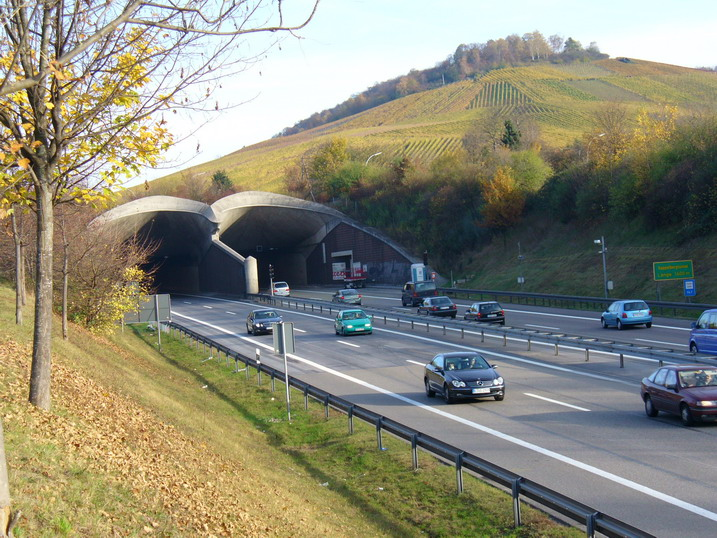
Fellbach-Kappelbergtunnel-West

Fellbach is integrated in the Verkehrs- und Tarifverbund Stuttgart. The city has a stop on the S-Bahn lines S2 (Schorndorf - Stuttgart - Airport - Filderstadt) and S3 (Backnang - Stuttgart Airport). At the Fellbach Lutherkirche is the terminus of the rail line U1 (Fellbach Lutherkirche - Hauptbahnhof - Vaihingen Bf) of the Stuttgarter Straßenbahnen. Furthermore, the urban area runs bus lines 58 ((Summer Rain -) Obere Ziegelei - Schmiden Rathaus), 60 ( Untertürkheim - Luginsland, 207 (Fellbach Alte Kelter - Fellbach - Schmiden - Oeffingen) 67 (Fellbach Bf Fellbach Altenheim), Waiblingen Bf -Korber Höhe) and 212 (Stetten - Rommelshausen - Fellbach Bf)

== Media ==
In Fellbach (and in Kernen im Remstal) appears as daily newspaper Fellbacher Zeitung. It is nationally identic with the Stuttgarter Nachrichten. The Stuttgarter Zeitung appears in Fellbach and Kernen im Remstal also with this self-produced local section.

== Public facilities ==
In Fellbach are the State Office for salaries and benefits of Baden-Württemberg. Fellbach has also a notary. In the industrial area near the Sommerrain is a building of the Landeskriminalamt Baden-Württemberg.

== Education ==
Fellbach has two gymnasiums, two Realschules, two elementary and secondary schools, four primary schools and a special school (Wichernhaus school). Furthermore, are located in Fellbach one of three schools for mentally and physically disabled of Rems-Murr-district, the Froebel school with kindergarten. There is also a municipal school of music, a youth art school and a youth technic school. In private ownership are the Helmut-of-Kügelgen School (Waldorf education) and the SIS Swiss International School Campus Fellbach. The Volkshochschule Unteres Remstal is a collaborative community college of Waiblingen, Fellbach, Weinstadt and Korb.

== Things ==
The Schwabenlandhalle is since 1976 the Culture and Congress Center of Fellbach. It hosts theater performances of tour stages. Likewise, the "Theater im Polygon" is native in Fellbach, which has its headquarters in Jugendhaus Fellbach. Also located in the district Schmiden is the revival house "Orfeo" in the vaulted cellar of the historic "Big House".

== City Museum ==
In Fellbach City Museum, opened in 1977, the city's history is shown. The museum is located in a half-timbered building from 1680. Here is also housed the archive Fellbach.

== Rotkreuz & TTE Museum ==
This museum offers to nearly 100 m^{2} a journey through the almost complete series of devices of all radio equipment, which was used after the Second World War until now by the Red Cross, the police, firefighters, emergency services and technical relief.

== Cityscape ==
Fellbach architectural appearance is on the one hand by his past as a wine village marked, on the other by the stormy industrial development since the early 20th century.

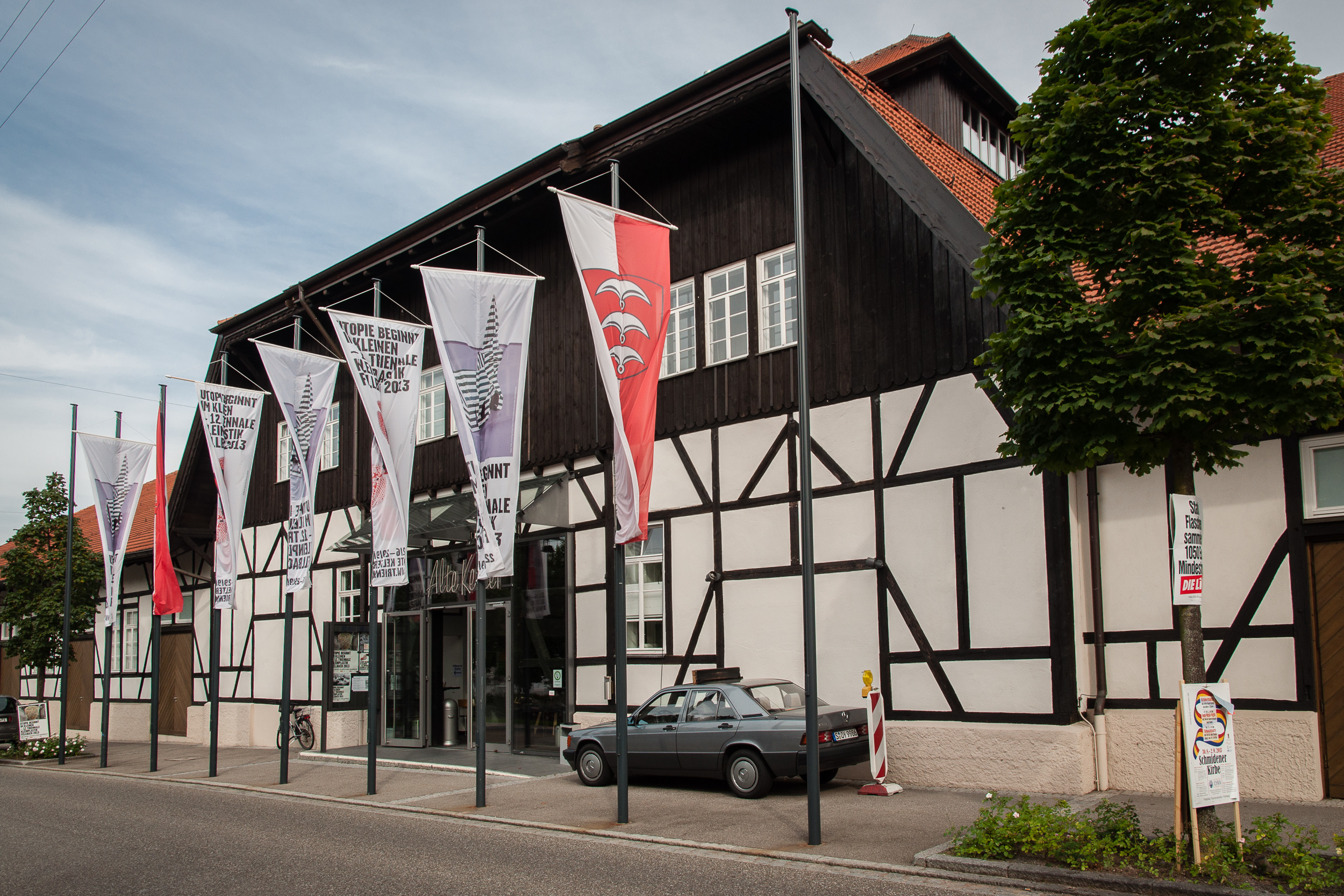
Alte Kelter Fellbach

In Old-Fellbach, former wine village at the foot of Kappel Berg, still dominate rural timbered houses from the 16th to the 18th century the big picture. Noteworthy is also the Fellbacher industrial architecture. By ill modernization in recent decades the historically grown building structures were ever broken, so that Fellbach has no longer a uniform cityscape today. Even the recent urban redevelopment measure are again several half-timbered houses like by demolition victims, including in the area of newly built Fellbacher market and currently in the rear street. In the 1950s, emerged on the outskirts several skyscrapers and numerous interspersed with green areas living quarters in the lower town. With the eastern ring road, built in 1989, the population threshold was further postponed into Schmidenen field. In contrast, the Western, aligned against Stuttgart suburbs long remained untouched, even to a possible annexation by the state capital counteract. Currently, this is where a large-sized combined indoor and outdoor pool is built.

== Freemen ==
The city Fellbach has conferred the honorary citizenship to the following persons:

- 1928: August Brändle, Schultheiss
- 1966: Max Graser, mayor
- 1991: Guntram Palm, mayor
- 2000: Friedrich-Wilhelm Kiel, mayor

The former municipality Schmiden has awarded the following persons honorary citizenship:

- 1958: Theodor Bürkle, farmer, member of council
- 1962: Gotthilf Bayh, mayor and Member of Landtag

== Notable people ==
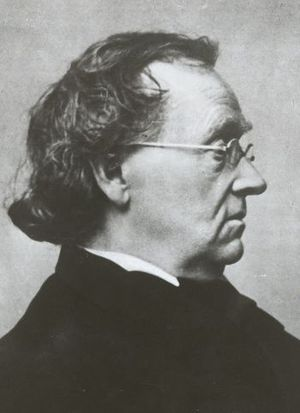
Eduard Mörike

- Karl August Auberlen (1824–1864), theologian, professor in Basel, the first son of Wilhelm Amandus Auberlen
- Ferdinand Christian Baur (1792–1860), theologian and church historian, founded the so-called Tübingen School
- Gerhard Ertl (born 1936), Nobel Prize in Chemistry in 2007, grew up in Fellbach-Schmiden
- Jakob Gauermann (1773–1843), landscape and genre painter
- Albert Gollhofer (born 1954), sport scientist and academic scholar.
- Otto Hagel (1909–1973), an American photographer and filmmaker.
- Sami Khedira (born 1987), football player, played 329 games and 77 for Germany, (grew up in Oeffingen)
- Eduard Mörike (1804–1875), poet and Lutheran pastor, lived with his sister in Fellbach in 1873 in a house since demolished.
- Friedrich Silcher (1789–1860), composer, lived in Fellbach from 1803 to 1806

== Literature ==
Otto Borst : Fellbach. Theiss, Stuttgart 1990, ISBN 3-8062-0594-9.

== Twin towns – sister cities ==
Fellbach is twinned with:

- Tain-l'Hermitage, France (1964)
- Tournon-sur-Rhône, France (1973)
- Erba, Italy (1978)
- Pécs, Hungary (1986)
- Meissen, Germany (1987)
