= Auberlen =

Auberlen is a surname. Notable people with the surname include:

- Bill Auberlen (born 1968), American racing driver
- Karl August Auberlen (1824–1864), German Lutheran theologian
