= Kappelberg =

Kappelberg may refer to the following hills in Germany:

- Kappelberg (Baden-Württemberg) (469 m), a hill in the Stuttgart region of Baden-Württemberg
- Kappelberg (Bavaria), a hill in the borough of Bissingen in the county of Dillingen an der Donau, Bavaria
- Kappelberg (Rhenish Hesse) (358 m), a hill in Rhenish Hesse, Rhineland-Palatinate
