= Edmund Pfleiderer =

German philosopher and theologian

Edmund Pfleiderer (German: [ˈpflaɪdɐʁɐ]; 12 October 1842, Stetten im Remstal (now a part of Kernen, Baden-Württemberg) – 3 April 1902, Tübingen) was a German philosopher and theologian.

== Biography ==
He entered the ministry (1864) and during the Franco-Prussian War served as army chaplain, an experience described in his Erlebnisse eines feldgeistlichen im kriege 1870/71 (1890). He was afterwards appointed professor ordinarius of philosophy at Kiel (1873), and in 1878 he was elected to the philosophical chair at Tübingen. He published works on Gottfried Wilhelm Leibniz, empiricism and scepticism in David Hume's philosophy, modern pessimism, Kantian criticism, English philosophy, Heraclitus of Ephesus and many other subjects.

The theologian Otto Pfleiderer was his older brother.

== Selected writings ==
- Gottfried Wilhelm Leibniz als Patriot, Staatsmann und Bildungsträger, 1870 – Gottfried Wilhelm Leibniz as a patriot, statesman and educationalist.
- Empirismus und Skepsis in Dav. Hume's Philosophie als abschliessender Zersetzung der englischen Erkenntnisslehre, Moral und Religionswissenschaft, 1874 – Empiricism and skepticism in David Hume's philosophy shown as the final decomposition of the English theory of knowledge, ethics and religious studies.
- Kantischer Kritizismus und englische Philosophie eine Beleuchtung der deutsch-englischen Neu-Empirismus, etc. 1881 – Kantian criticism and English philosophy, an illumination of German-English new empiricism.
- Lotze's philosophische Weltanschauung nach ihren Grundzügen : zur Erinnerung an den Verstorbenen, 1882 – Hermann Lotze's philosophical worldview, etc.
- Arnold Geulinx als Hauptvertreter der okkasionalistischen Metaphysik und Ethik – Arnold Geulincx as the main representative of occasionalistic metaphysics and ethics.
- Die Philosophie des Heraklit von Ephesus im Lichte der Mysterienidee, 1886 – The philosophy of Heraclitus of Ephesus in light of the idea of the Mysteries.
- Sokrates und Plato, 1896 – Socrates and Plato.
- Zur Frage der Kausalität; eine erkenntnistheoretische Untersuchung, 1897 – On the question of causality; an epistemological investigation.
- Augustine bekenntnisse, gekürzt und verdeutscht, 1902 – Augustinian confessions.
