= Otto Pfleiderer =

German Protestant theologian (1839–1908)

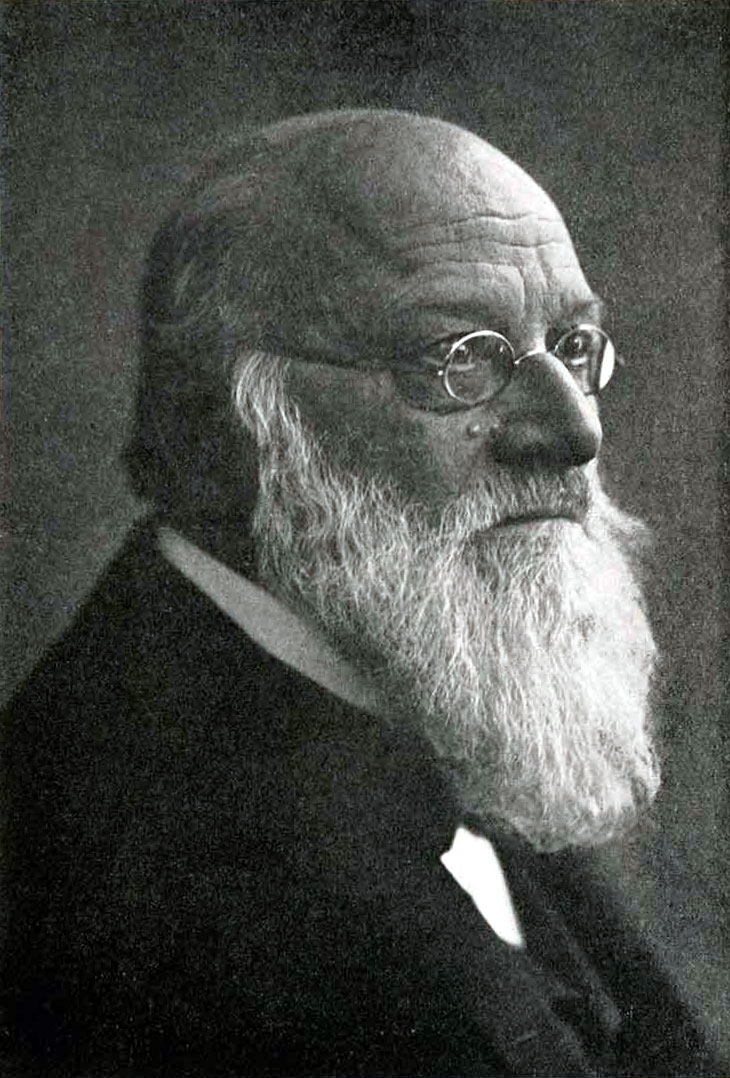
Otto Pfleiderer

Otto Pfleiderer (German: [ˈpflaɪdɐʁɐ]; 1 September 1839 – 18 July 1908) was a German Protestant theologian. Through his writings and his lectures, he became known as one of the most influential representatives of liberal theology.

== Biography ==
Pfleiderer was born at Stetten im Remstal (now a part of Kernen, Baden-Württemberg) in Württemberg. From 1857 to 1861 he studied at the University of Tübingen under Ferdinand Christian Baur, and afterwards in England and Scotland. He then entered the ministry, became tutor (German: Repetent) at Tübingen, and for a short time held a pastorate at Heilbronn (1868). In 1870 he became chief pastor and superintendent at the University of Jena and soon afterwards professor ordinarius of theology, but in 1875 he was called to the chair of systematic theology at Berlin, having made his name by a series of articles on New Testament criticism and Johannine and Pauline theology, which appeared in Adolf Hilgenfeld's Zeitschrift für wissenschaftliche Theologie, and by his Der Paulinismus, published in 1873. Das Urchristentum, seine Schriften und Lehren, in geschichtlichen Zusammenhang beschrieben was published in 1878 and considerably enlarged for a second edition in 1902.

In 1890 appeared The Development of Theology since Kant, and its Progress in Great Britain since 1825, which was written for publication in England. A more elaborate work was his Religionsphilosophie auf geschichtlichen Grundlage (1878). "The Influence of the Apostle Paul on the Development of Christianity" was the title of a course of Hibbert Lectures given in London in 1885. In 1894 he delivered the Gifford Lectures at Edinburgh, the subject being "The Philosophy and Development of Religion". His later publications included:

- The Early Christian Conception of Christ (1905)
- Die Entstehung des Christentums (1905)
- Religion und Religionen (1906)
- Die Entwicklung des Christentums (1907).

He died at Groß-Lichterfelde, near Berlin. In New Testament criticism, Pfleiderer belonged to the critical school, which grew out of the impulse given by F. C. Baur. However, like other modern German theologians, he showed a greater disposition to compromise. All his work shows a judicial tone of mind, and is remarkable for the charm of its style.

Pfleiderer's younger brother Edmund Pfleiderer distinguished himself both in philosophy and theology.

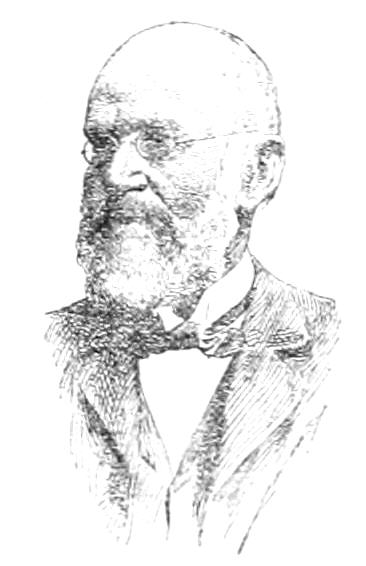
Otto Pfleiderer in 1906, as published in Larousse Mensuel Illustré

== Works ==
- The Development of Theology since Kant – online text at the Internet Archive.
- Lectures on the influence of the apostle Paul on the development of Christianity, delivered in London and Oxford in April and May, 1885 – online text at the Internet Archive.
- Paulinism; a contribution to the history of primitive Christian theology, 1877, Vol. 1, Vol. 2 – online text at the Internet Archive.
- The Philosophy of Religion: On the Basis of Its History, Vol. 1, 1886; Vol. 2, 1887; Vol. 4, 1888; Vol. 1, 1894; Vol. 2, 1894; Vol. 3, 1888; Vol. 4, 1894 - online text at the Internet Archive.
- Religion and historic faiths, 1907 – online text at the Internet Archive.
- Primitive Christianity: Its Writings and Teachings in Their Historical Connections, 1906 – online text at the Internet Archive.
- Evolution and Theology and Other Essays, 1900 – online text at the Internet Archive.
- The development of Christianity, 1910 – online text at the Internet Archive.
