= Adolf Bernhard Christoph Hilgenfeld =

German Protestant theologian (1823–1907)

Adolf Hilgenfeld
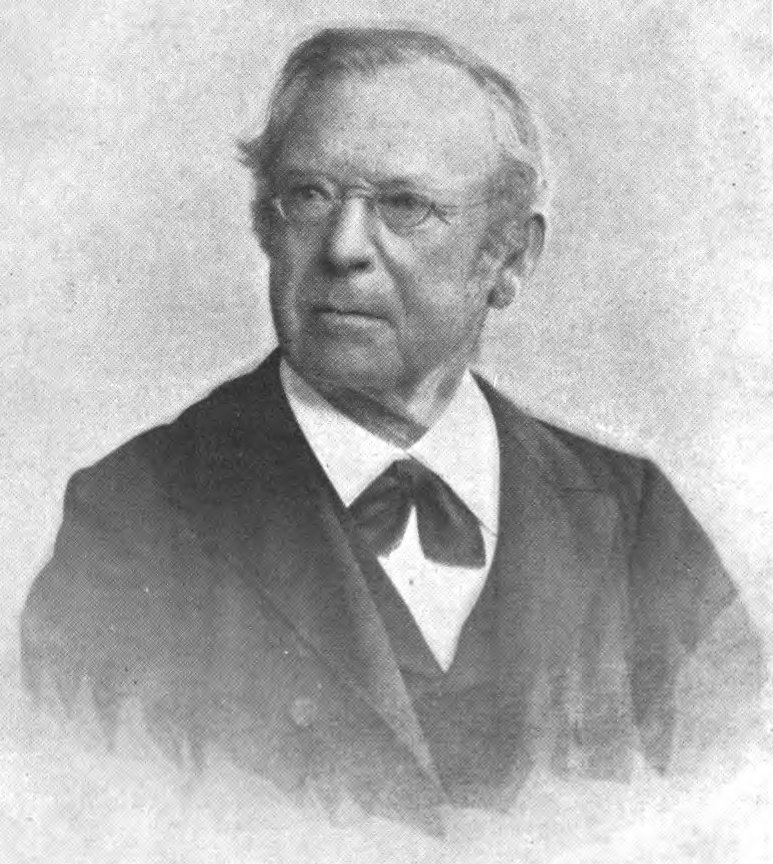
- Hilgenfeld in 1896
- Born: 2 June 1823; Stappenbeck near Salzwedel, Province of Saxony
- Died: 12 January 1907 (aged 83); Jena, Grand Duchy of Saxony

Academic background
- Education: Friedrich Wilhelm University, Berlin; University of Halle

Academic work
- Discipline: Theology; New Testament
- School or tradition: Tübingen School
- Institutions: University of Jena

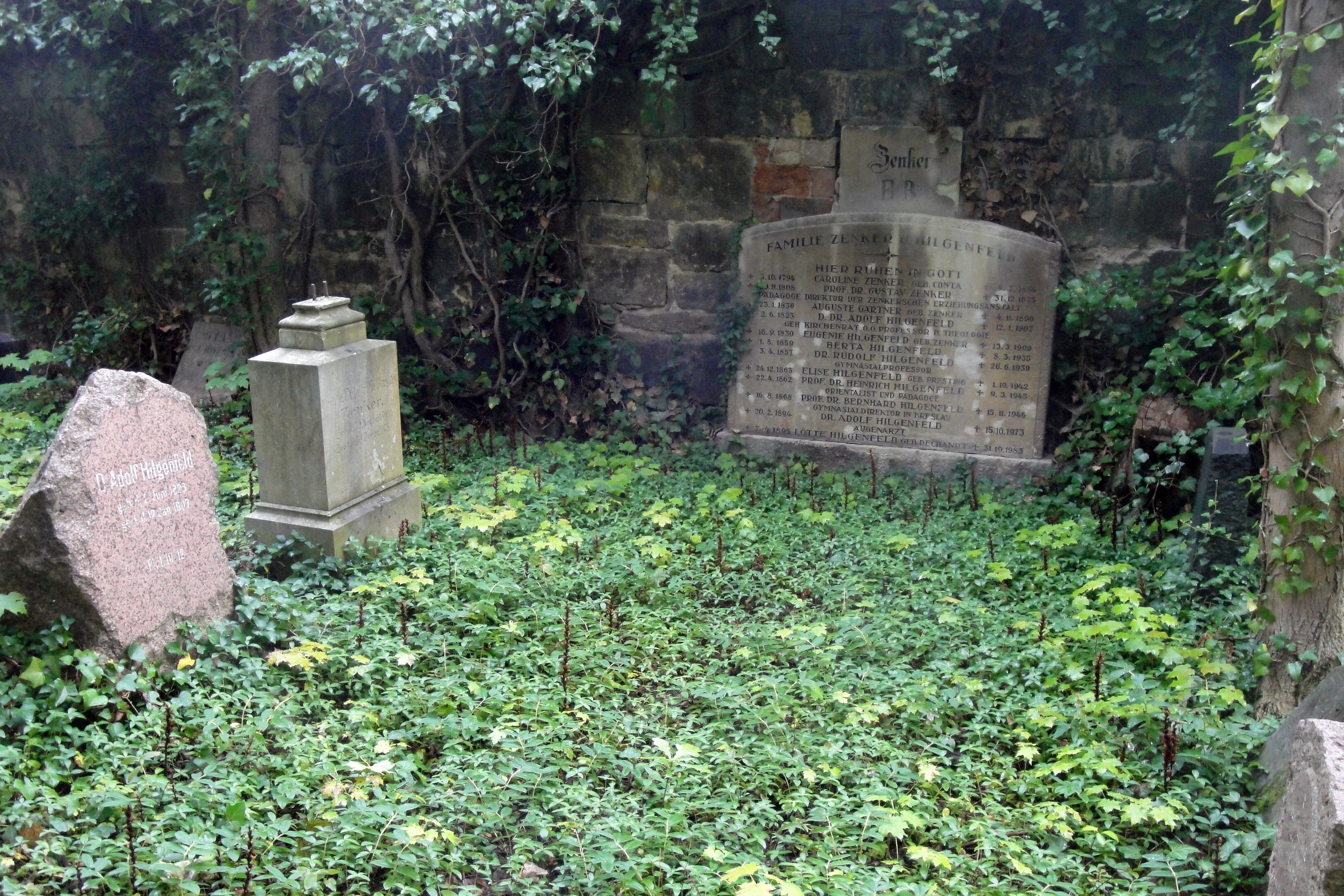
Grave in Jena

Adolf Bernhard Christoph Hilgenfeld (2 June 1823 – 12 January 1907) was a German Protestant theologian.

== Biography ==
He was born at Stappenbeck near Salzwedel in the Province of Saxony. His father and grandfather were pastors.

He studied at the Friedrich Wilhelm University in Berlin and the University of Halle, and in 1890 became professor ordinarius of theology at the University of Jena. He belonged to the Tübingen school. Fond of emphasizing his independence of Ferdinand Christian Baur, he still, in all important points, followed in the footsteps of his master; his method, which he is wont to contrast as Literarkritik with Baur's Tendenzkritik, "is nevertheless essentially the same as Baur's."

On the whole, however, he modified the positions of the founder of the Tübingen school, going beyond him only in his investigations into the Fourth Gospel. In 1858 he became editor of the Zeitschrift für wissenschaftliche Theologie. Hilgenfeld died in Jena in 1907, aged 83.

== Family ==
Hilgenfeld was married twice, first to Luise Wolterstorff in 1854, and after her death in 1868, he married Eugenie Zenker; he and Luise had one son, Heinrich.

== Selected works ==
- Hilgenfeld, Adolf B. C. (1848). Die elementarischen Recognitionen and Homilien.
- ——— (1849). Die Evangelien and die Briefe des Johannes nach ihrem Lehrbegriff.
- ——— (1850). Das Markusevangelium.
- ——— (1854). Die Evangelien nach ihrer Entstehung and geschichtlichen Bedeutung. S. Hirzel. ISBN 9780837095479.
- ——— (1855). Das Urchristentum und seine neuesten Bearbeitungen.
- ——— (1857). Die jüdische Apokalyptik in ihrer geschichtlichen Entwicklung.
- ——— (1866). Novum Testamentum extra canonem receptum (4 parts ed.).
- ——— (1875). Historische-kritische Einleitung in das Neue Testament.
- ——— (1884). Die ketzergeschichte des urchristentums, urkundlich dargestellt.
- ——— (1899). Acta Apostolorum graece et latine secundum antiquissimos testes.
- ——— (1887). The first complete edition of the Shepherd of Hermas.
- ——— (1902). Ignatii et Polycarpi epistolae.
