= Friedrich Christoph Oetinger =

German Lutheran theologian and theosopher (1702-1782)

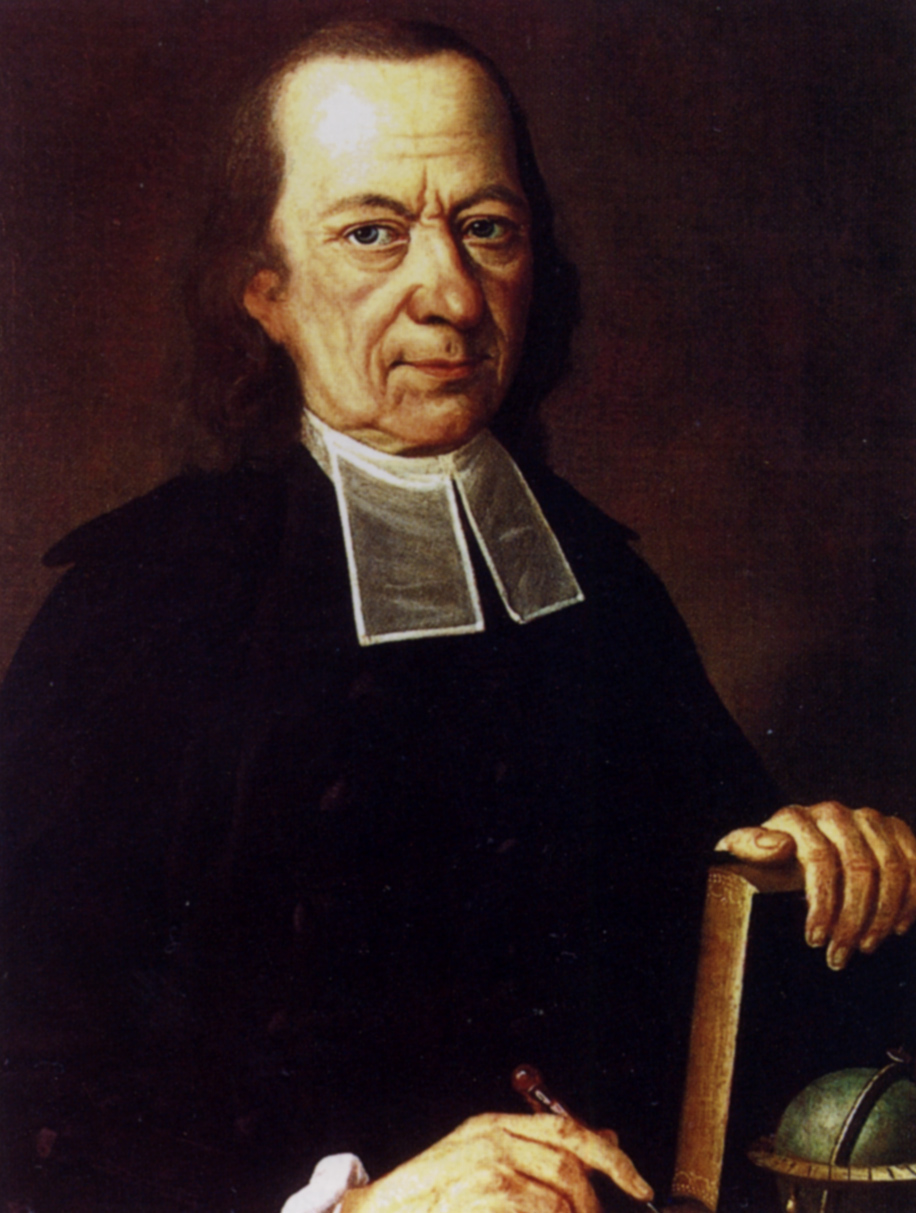
Portrait by Georg Adam Eger, 1775

Friedrich Christoph Oetinger (2 May 1702 – 10 February 1782) was a German Lutheran pastor, theologian, theosopher and writer.

== Biography ==
Oetinger was born at Göppingen. He studied philosophy and Lutheran theology at the Tübinger Stift (1722–1728), and was impressed by the works of Jakob Böhme, and also devoted attention to Leibniz and Wolff. On the completion of his university course, Oetinger spent some years travelling. In 1730 he visited the leader of the Moravian Church, Count Zinzendorf at Herrnhut, remaining there some months as a teacher of Hebrew and Greek. During his travels, in his eager search for knowledge, he made the acquaintance of mystics and separatists, Christians and learned Jews, theologians and physicians alike. The Philadelphians influenced him to accept apocatastasis, the belief that all people would eventually be saved; he wove this into his theological system, depending chiefly upon I Corinthians 15 and Ephesians 1:9-11.

After some delay, he was ordained to the ministry and in 1738 he was appointed pastor at Hirschau. While pastor (from 1746) at Walddorf near Tübingen, he studied alchemy and made many experiments, his idea being to use his knowledge for symbolic purposes. These practices exposed him to the attacks of persons who misunderstood him. "My religion," he once said, "is the parallelism of Nature and Grace."

Oetinger translated a part of Emanuel Swedenborg's philosophy of heaven and earth, and added notes of his own. In 1760 he defended Swedenborg's work and invited him to Germany. His treatise Swedenborg's and other Earthly and Heavenly Philosophies was published in 1765. This and his translations of Swedenborg brought upon him the censure of his ecclesiastical superiors, but he was protected by the Duke of Württemberg. In 1752 he was appointed superintendent of the churches in the district of Weinsberg; he subsequently held the same position in Herrenberg, and afterward he became prelate at Murrhardt, where he died.

His 1770 publication Die Metaphysic in Connexion mit der Chemie examined the relationships between medicine, music, philosophy, law, alchemy, and Kabbalah; readers included Mozart and Moses Mendelssohn. Friedrich Wilhelm Joseph von Schelling also read Oetinger's works.

== Bibliography ==
Oetinger's bibliography lists 167 works, in which he expounded his theological and theosophic views. A collected edition, Sämtliche Schriften (1st section, Homiletische Schriften, 5 vols., 1858–1866; 2nd section, Theosophische Werke, 6 vols., 1858–1863), was prepared by Karl Christian Eberhard Ehmann, who also edited Oetinger's Leben und Briefe (1859). See also C. A. Auberlen: Die Theosophie Friedr. Chr. Oetinger's (1847; 2nd ed., 1859), and Herzog: Friedrich Christoph Ötinger (1902).

- Oetinger, Friedrich Christoph. Earthly and Heavenly Philosophy: Swedenborg, Boehme, and Other Thinkers. Scholarly Translations (2026). ISBN 979-8199323673
- Oetinger, Friedrich Christoph. Biblisches und Emblematisches Wörterbuch. Herausgegeben von Gerhard Schäfer in Verbindung mit Otto Betz [Tübingen], Reinhard Breymayer, Eberhard [Martin] Gutekunst, Ursula Hardmeier [, geb. Paschke], Roland Pietsch, Guntram Spindler. Berlin, New York: Walter de Gruyter 1999.
- Oetinger, Friedrich Christoph. Inquisitio in sensum communem et rationem... (1753) Stuttgart-Bad Cannstatt, 1964.
- Oetinger, Friedrich Christoph. Die Lehrtafel der Prinzessin Antonia. Herausgegeben von Reinhard Breymayer und Friedrich Häußermann. Berlin, New York: Walter de Gruyter 1977, ISBN 3-11-004130-8
- Oetinger, Friedrich Christoph. Theologia ex idea vitae deducta. Herausgegeben von Konrad Ohly. Berlin, New York: Walter de Gruyter 1979, ISBN 3-11-004872-8
- English translation: "Theology Drawn out of the Idea of Life." Catawissa, Pennsylvania: Scholarly Translations, 2026. ISBN 979-8245458625
- Oetinger, Friedrich Christoph. Die Wahrheit des sensus communis oder des allgemeinen Sinnes... Ehmann, 1861.
- Die Werke Friedrich Christoph Oetingers. Chronologisch-systematische Bibliographie 1707–2014, bearbeitet von Martin Weyer-Menkhoff und Reinhard Breymayer. (Berlin; München; Boston [, Massachusetts, USA] : ) (Walter) de Gruyter (GmbH), [März] 2015 (Bibliographie zur Geschichte des Pietismus, Band 3. Im Auftrag der Historischen Kommission zur Erforschung des Pietismus [Hannover, bei der Union Evangelischer Kirchen in der Evangelischen Kirche in Deutschland] hrsg. von Hans Schneider, Hans Otte, Hans-Jürgen Schrader). – VIII, 445 pp.
  - Print: ISBN 978-3-11-041450-9; ISBN 3-11-041450-3.
  - eBook (PDF): e-ISBN 978-3-11-041460-8.
  - eBook (EPUB): e-ISBN 978-3-11-041465-3.
  - Print/eBook: ISBN 978-3-11-041461-5.

Oetinger's autobiography was published by Julius Hamberger in 1845 and later by Julius Rößle:

- Oetinger, Friedrich Christoph. Selbstbiographie. Genealogie der reellen Gedanken eines Gottesgelehrten. Hrsg. und mit Einführung versehen von J[ulius] Roessle. Metzingen: Ernst Franz Verlag 1990, ISBN 3-7722-0035-4

The English translation with commentaries:

- Oetinger, Friedrich Christoph. Genealogy of the Well-Grounded Thoughts of a Theologian [Genealogie der reellen Gedanken eines Gottesgelehrten] Reutlingen 1818 - Stuttgart 1859. In: Herzog, Frederick: European pietism reviewed. San Jose, California: Pickwick Publications (2003) (Princeton Theological Monograph Series; 50), pp. (103)-177 (pp. [105]-108: Editor's Introduction]).
