= Wilhelm Nestle =

German philologist and philosopher (1865–1959)

- Born: April 16, 1865; Stuttgart, Kingdom of Württemberg
- Died: April 18, 1959 (aged 94); Stuttgart, West Germany
- Occupations: Philologist, philosopher

Wilhelm Nestle (German: [ˈnɛstlə]; 16 April 1865 – 18 April 1959) was a German philologist and philosopher.

== Biography ==
Wilhelm Nestle was the only child of High Court Attorney Christian Gottlieb Nestle (died 1879) and Maria Christiane Steudel (died 1889), who had had other children in previous marriages. Following his school years, Nestle studied classical philology, philosophy, and history at the University of Tübingen and at the Humboldt University of Berlin. He was a student, among others, of Alfred von Gutschmid and Erwin Rohde. In 1888 he passed the teacher's exam and in 1889 he obtained his doctorate in Philosophy in Tübingen. Then he entered the school service in Württemberg, frequently changing posts. Among others, he worked in Heilbronn, Tübingen, Stuttgart, Maulbronn and Ulm. There he married Klara Neuffer in 1899 and undertook, in the same year, study trips to Greece and Italy. In 1900, he assumed a post of tutor at Schwäbisch Hall. In that city he published the first of many works: Euripides, der Dichter der griechischen Aufklärung (Euripides, the poet of the Greek Enlightenment), which earned him the call in 1902 as professor at the evangelist theological seminary of Schöntal, where he taught for six years. From 1909 to 1913 he was director of higher studies at the Karlsgymnasium in Stuttgart; from 1913 to 1919 he was rector of the Heilbronner Karlsgymnasiums, after which he returned to the Karlsgymnasium in Stuttgart as third rector. Retired in 1932, he was appointed honorary professor of Greek philosophy at the University of Tübingen. Following the publication of numerous philological writings, in 1940 and 1944 his main works appeared: Vom Mythos zum Logos, die Selbstentfaltung des griechischen Denkens von Homer bis auf die Sophistik und Sokrates (From Mythos to Logos: The Self-development of Greek Thought from Homer to the Sophistics and Socrates) and Griechische Geistesgeschichte von Homer bis Lukian in ihrer Entfaltung vom mythischen zum rationalen Denken dargestellt (History of the Greek Spirit from Homer to Lucian, Presented in its Development from Mythical to Rational Thought). In 1947, the University of Heidelberg awarded him the Kuno Fischer Prize for Vom Mythos zum Logos. On the same date Nestle began to go blind. He died at the age of ninety-four.

One of his sons was the classical philologist Walter Nestle (1902–1945).

== Work ==
The length of Nestle's work is estimated, in the bibliography published by his son in 1965 on the occasion of the centenary of his birth, to be 34 books, 212 articles and tracts for magazines and newspapers as well as 628 reviews. In his posthumous legacy there are undoubtedly many other unpublished manuscripts. The core of his work is configured, beginning with his first work of 1903, with the writings on Greek philosophy, including the publication in 1913, in collaboration with Otto Crusius, of the third volume of the Philologica by Friedrich Nietzsche and a series of fundamental works, such as the four-volume collection Die griechischen Philosophen (The Greek philosophers), the work Griechische Religiosität in ihren Grundzügen und Hauptvertretern (Greek Religiosity in its Characteristic Features and its Main Representatives, in three volumes), as well as a Geschichte der griechischen Literatur (History of Greek literature). His main works, which appeared late in 1940 and 1944, are the aforementioned Vom Mythos zum Logos, die Selbstentfaltung des griechischen Denkens von Homer bis auf die Sophistik und Sokrates and Griechische Geistesgeschichte von Homer bis Lukian in ihrer Entfaltung vom mythischen zum rationalen Denken dargestellt, are the result of his Greek studies conducted over several decades. Some theological writings also belong to his late work, such as Die Krisis des Christentums, ihre Ursache, ihr Werden und ihre Bedeutung (The Crisis of Christianity, its Cause, its Evolution and its Meaning), of 1947. The theologian Josef Hasenfuß summarized the basic thesis of this book as follows: “Today people could no longer be bound to the Christian creed; but they needed the ethics of Jesus to avoid the threat of self-destruction. That is why the only option left for the church is to turn away from dogmatics and turn to the ethical core of Jesus' teaching, to love one's neighbor."

== Honors ==
- 1953: Cross of Merit of the Order of Merit of the Federal Republic of Germany.

== Selected works ==
- Melt antiker Münzen im Königreich Württemberg. (Finds of Ancient Coins in the Kingdom of Württemberg.) edited by the Commission for Württemberg State History. Stuttgart, Kohlhammer Verlag, 1893.
- Euripides, der Dichter der griechischen Aufklärung, (Euripides, The Poet of the Greek Enlightenment,) 1901. Reprint. 1969, 1985.
- Vorsokratiker in Auswahl übersetzt und Herausgegeben. ( Presocratics translated into selections and edited.) 1908. 3rd ed., 1929.
- Coeditor, with O. Crusius, of Friedrich Nietzsche, Werke, Vol 19 (Philologica III), 1913.
- Editing and proofreading of Philosophie der Entwicklung Griechen in ihrer geschichtlichen (The Philosophy of the Greeks in its Historical Development) of Eduard Zeller. 6th ed. 1919. 7th, 1922; Volume II, 1920.
- Editing and revising der Geschichte der griechischen Grundriss Philosophie, Eduard Zeller. 12th ed., 1920, 13 th, 1928, English translation Outlines of the History of Greek philosophy by Sarah Frances Alleyne and Evelyn Abbott. 1931.
- Die Sokratiker. (The Socratics.) 1922.
- Die Nachsokratiker. (The post-Socratics.) 2 vols., 1922–1923.
- Geschichte der Literatur griechischen. (History of Greek Literature) 1923. 2nd edition. 1942–1943. 3rd ed. 1961–1963, reworked by W. Liebich. trans. Spanish in 1930.
- Die griechische Religiosität in ihren Grundzügen Hauptvertretern von und bis Proklos Homer. (The Main Characteristics of Greek Religiosity From Proclus and to Homer.) From 1930 to 1934.
- Platons Hauptwerke. (Plato's Major Works.) Selection, trans. and introduction of works of Plato. Leipzig, Alfred Kröner, 1931. 1934 4th ed. 1942.
- Aristotle: Hauptwerke. (Aristotle: Major Works.) Stuttgart, Alfred Kröner Verlag, 1935. 4th ed., 1952.
- Vom Mythos zum Logos. Die des griechischen Denkens Selbstentfaltung von Homer bis auf die Sophistik und Sokrates. (From Mythos to Logos: The Self-development of Greek Thought from Homer to the Sophistics and Socrates.) 1940. 2nd edition. 1942. Reprint. 1975, 1986.
- Homer von bis Geistesgeschichte Griechische Lukian in ihrer Entfaltung vom zum rationalen mythischen dargestellt denken. (Greek Intellectual History from Homer to Lucian, Presented in its Development from Mythical to Rational Thinking.) 1944. Reprint., 1949, 1956.
- Griechische Weltanschauung in ihrer Bedeutung für die Gegenwart, Vortrage und Abhandlungen. (Greek Worldview in Its Importance for the Present: Lectures and Treatises.) Stuttgart, Hannsmann, 1946. Reprint., 1969.
- Die Krisis des Christenthums in der Welt modernen, ihre Ursache, ihr Werden und ihre Bedeutung. (The Crisis of Christianity, its Cause, its Evolution and its Meaning.) 1947.
- Griechische Lebensweisheit und Lebenskunst; aus den Quellen zusammengestellt, und mit einem Nachwort übersetzt versehen. (Greek Wisdom and Art of Living; compiled from the Sources, and translated with an afterword.) Stuttgart, Hädecke, 1949.
- Die griechischen Philosophen in Auswahl übersetzt und Herausgegeben. (The Greek Philosophers in Selection Translated and Edited.) Reprint. 1968–1969.
