= Wolfgang Dietrich (businessman) =

German businessman

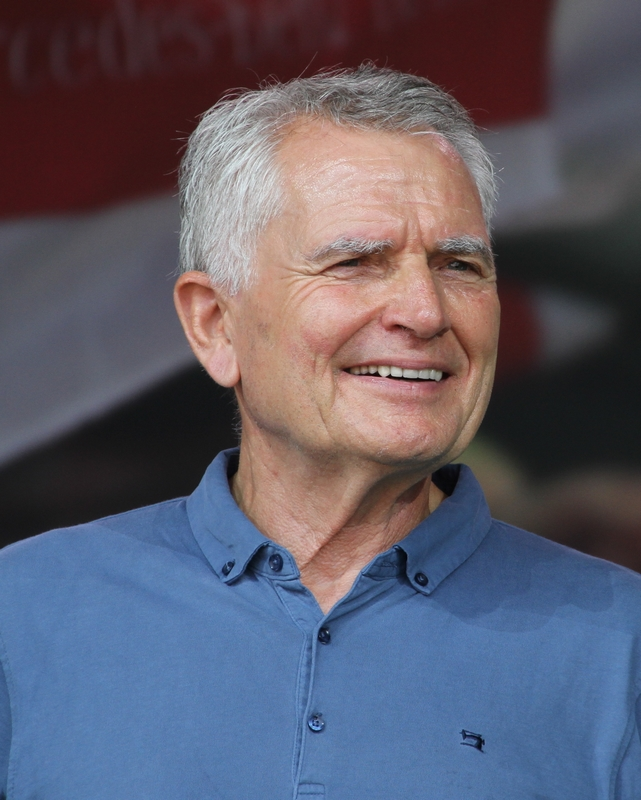
Wolfgang Dietrich

Wolfgang Dietrich (born 24 July 1948 in Stetten im Remstal) is a German businessman. From 2010 to 2015 he was spokesman for Stuttgart 21 and the Wendlingen–Ulm high-speed railway.

The supervisory board of VfB Stuttgart presented Dietrich on 15 August 2016 as their candidate for the election of the president of the club. He was elected on 9 October 2016. On 15 July 2019, Dietrich retired.
