= Eduard Zeller =

German philosopher and theologian (1814–1908)

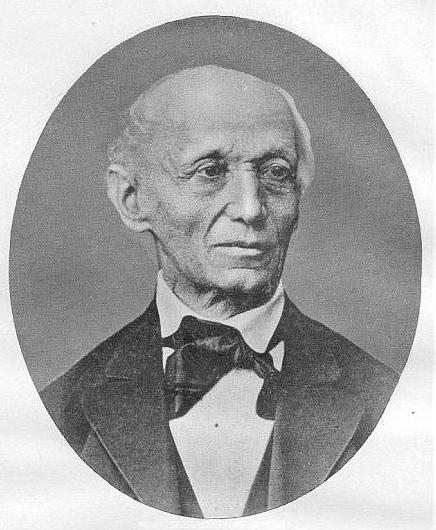
- Born: Eduard Gottlob Zeller; 22 January 1814; Kleinbottwar, Kingdom of Württemberg
- Died: 19 March 1908 (aged 94); Stuttgart, Kingdom of Württemberg, German Empire

Education
- Education: Tübinger Stift; University of Tübingen (PhD, 1836, Dr. phil. hab., 1840)
- Academic advisor: Ferdinand Christian Baur

Philosophical work
- Era: 19th-century philosophy
- Region: Western philosophy
- School: Tübingen School; Hegelianism (early); Neo-Kantianism (later
- Institutions: University of Tübingen; University of Bern; University of Marburg; Heidelberg University; University of Berlin
- Doctoral students: Paul Deussen
- Notable students: Georg Simmel
- Main interests: Ancient Greek philosophy; History of philosophy; Philosophy of religion; Epistemology; Theology
- Notable ideas: Historical-critical study of Greek philosophy

Eduard Gottlob Zeller (/ˈzɛlər/; German: [ˈtsɛlɐ]; 22 January 1814 – 19 March 1908) was a German philosopher and Protestant theologian of the Tübingen School of theology. He was well known for his writings on Ancient Greek philosophy, especially pre-Socratic philosophy, and most of all for his celebrated, multi-volume historical treatise The Philosophy of Greeks in their Historical Development (1844–52). Zeller was also a central figure in the rise of neo-Kantianism.

== Life ==
Eduard Zeller was born in Kleinbottwar in the Kingdom of Württemberg, the son of a government official. He was educated first at the Evangelical Seminaries of Maulbronn and Blaubeuren starting in 1831, and later at the University of Tübingen (the Tübinger Stift), then much under the influence of Hegel. He received his doctorate in 1836 with a thesis on Plato's Laws. In 1840 he was Privatdozent of theology at Tübingen, in 1847 professor of theology at Bern, and in 1849 professor of theology at Marburg, where he soon shifted to the philosophy faculty as the result of disputes with the Clerical party. He became professor of philosophy at the University of Heidelberg in 1862, moved to Berlin in 1872, and retired around 1895. He remained best known for his The Philosophy of Greeks in Their Historical Development (1844–52). He continued to expand and improve this work to reflect new research, and the last edition appeared in 1902. It was translated into most European languages and became the standard textbook on Greek philosophy.

Zeller also published many works on theology and three volumes of philosophical essays. He was also one of the founders of the Theologische Jahrbücher (Theological Yearbooks), a periodical which became well known as the exponent of the Tübingen School historical-critical method of David Strauss and Christian Baur. He wrote much on the debate about whether theology was a kind of science (Wissenschaft).

Like most of his contemporaries, including Friedrich Theodor Vischer, he began with Hegelianism, but subsequently developed a system of his own. He felt the necessity of going back to Kant and critically reconsidering the epistemological problems which, he believed, Kant had only partially resolved.

He died in Stuttgart.

== Philosophical work ==
Nonetheless, his accomplishments in the history of philosophy were far more influential than his contributions as an original thinker. Zeller's conception of the history of Greek thought was influenced by the dialectical philosophy of Hegel. Some critics maintain that Zeller was not alive enough to cultural context and to the idiosyncrasies of individual thinkers. Some hold that he laid too much stress upon Hegel's notion of "concept", and relied too much on the Hegelian antithesis of subject and object, though his history of Greek philosophy was nonetheless influential and highly regarded. He received the highest recognition, not only from philosophers and learned societies all over the world, but also from the German emperor and German people. In 1894 the Emperor Wilhelm II made him a "Wirklicher Geheimrat" with the title of "Excellenz," and his bust, along with that of Helmholtz, was set up at the Brandenburg Gate near the statues erected to the Emperor and Empress Frederick.

The Philosophie der Griechen has been translated into English by S. F. Alleyne (2 vols, 1881) in sections: S. F. Alleyne, History of Greek Philosophy to the time of Socrates (1881) Volume 1 and Volume 2; O. J. Reichel, Socrates and the Socratic Schools (1868; 2nd ed. 1877; 3rd ed. 1885); S. F. Alleyne and A. Goodwin, Plato and the Older Academy (1876); Benjamin Francis Conn Costelloe and J. H. Muirhead, Aristotle and the Earlier Peripatetics (1897)Volume 1 and Volume 2; O. J. Reichel, Stoics, Epicureans and Sceptics (1870 and 1880); S. F. Alleyne, History of Eclecticism in Greek Philosophy (1883).

Zeller was also, in his Philosophie der Griechen, one of the first to use the word 'Superhuman' (übermensch), later central in Nietzsche and the propaganda of the Nazi Party, in adjectival form as a technical term in philosophy. He said "... thus the happiness in her can be designated superhuman (übermenschliche) while in contrast the happiness flowing from ethical virtues is merely a characteristic human good.'

== Works ==
The Philosophie appeared in an abbreviated form as Grundriss der Geschichte der Griechischen Philosophie (1883; 5th ed. 1898); English transl. by Alleyne and Evelyn Abbott (1886), under the title, Outlines of the History of Greek Philosophy.

Among his other works are:

- Platonische Studien (1839)
- Die Apostelgeschichte kritisch untersucht (1854; English translation J Dare, 1875–76: Volume 1 and Volume 2)
- Entwickelung des Monotheismus bei den Griechen (1862)
- Strauss und Renan (1864); (English translation 1866)
- Geschichte der christlichen Kirche (1898)
- Geschichte der deutschen Philosophie seit Leibniz (1873, ed. 1875)
- Staat und Kirche (1873)
- Strauss in seinen Leben und Schriften 1874; (English translation 1874)
- Über Bedeutung und Aufgabe der Erkenntnisstheorie (1862)
- Über teleologische und mechanische Naturerklärung (1876)
- Vorträge und Abhandlungen (1865–84)
- Religion und Philosophie bei den Römern (1866, ed. 1871)
- Philosophische Aufsätze (1887).

== See also ==
- Wilhelm Nestle
