= Tübinger Stift =

German theological school

Coordinates: 48°31′10″N 9°03′12″E

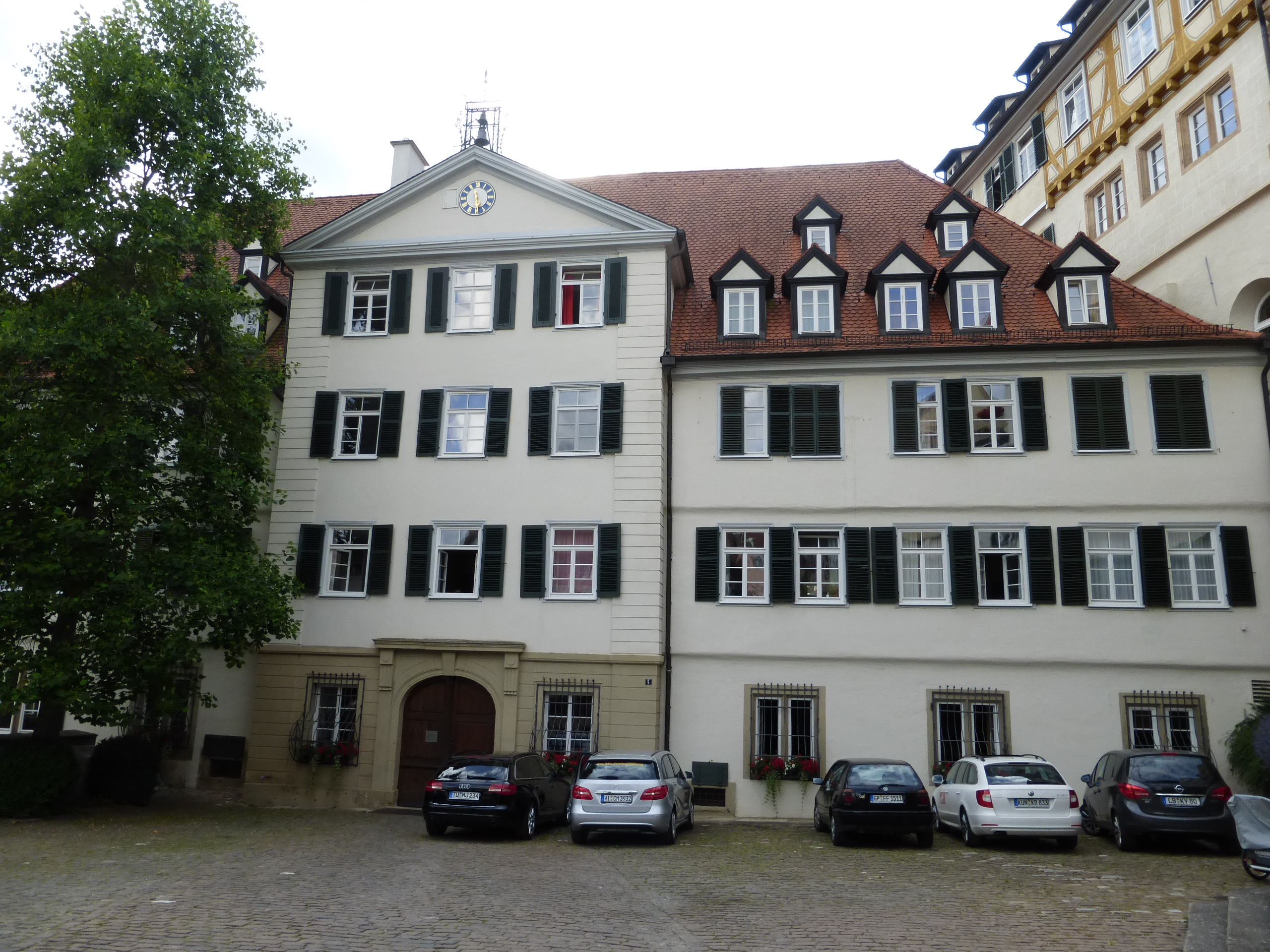
The Tübinger Stift

The Tübinger Stift (German: [ˈtyːbɪŋɐ ˈʃtɪft]) is a hall of residence and teaching; it is owned and supported by the Evangelical-Lutheran Church in Württemberg, and located in the university city of Tübingen, in South West Germany.

== History ==
The Stift was founded as an Augustinian monastery in the Middle Ages. After the Reformation, in 1536, Duke Ulrich turned the Stift into a seminary which served to prepare Protestant pastors for Württemberg. To this day the scholarship is still given to students in preparation for the ministry or teaching in Baden-Württemberg. Students receive a scholarship which consists of boarding, lodging and further academic support.

Some of the well known "Stiftlers" are the astronomer Johannes Kepler and his associate, statesman Hans Ulrich von Eggenberg, the poet Friedrich Hölderlin who had as roommates the philosophers G. W. F. Hegel and Friedrich Schelling (although the latter was five years their junior), the theologians David Friedrich Strauß, Johann Albrecht Bengel, Friedrich Christoph Oetinger, Ferdinand Christian Baur and Eberhard Nestle, and the philologist August Pauly.

The curriculum included two years of philosophical studies and three years of theological studies. The teaching staff imparted a traditional type of education, applying strict discipline and considerable censorship on the students' readings. Nonetheless, during Hegel's tenure, students privately had access to the 'forbidden' texts of Spinoza, Kant and Voltaire.

== Alumni ==
- Nikodemus Frischlin, poet, playwright, humanist, mathematician, astronomer (1547–1590)
- Michael Maestlin, astronomer, mathematician (1550–1631)
- Hans Ulrich von Eggenberg, Statesman (1568–1634)
- Johannes Kepler, astronomer (1571–1630)
- Johann Valentin Andreae, theologian (1586–1654)
- Wilhelm Schickhardt, theologian, astronomer, universal scientist (1592–1635)
- Johann Albrecht Bengel, theologian (1687–1752)
- Friedrich Christoph Oetinger, theologian (1702–1782)
- Karl Friedrich Reinhard, French politician and diplomate (1761–1837)
- Karl Philipp Conz, poet, writer (1762–1827)
- Friedrich Hölderlin, poet (1770–1843)
- Georg Wilhelm Friedrich Hegel, philosopher (1770–1831)
- Friedrich Schelling, philosopher (1775–1854)
- Gustav Schwab, minister, poet, writer (1792–1850)
- Ferdinand Christian Baur, theologian (1792–1860)
- August Pauly, philologist (1796–1845)
- Wilhelm Hauff, writer (1802–1827)
- Wilhelm Waiblinger, poet, writer (1804–1830)
- Eduard Mörike, minister and poet (1804–1875)
- Friedrich Theodor Vischer, writer, professor of literature (1807–1887)
- David Friedrich Strauß, theologian, philosopher, writer (1808–1874)
- Hermann Kurz, poet, writer (1813–1873)
- Eduard Zeller, theologian, philosopher (1814–1908)
- Georg Herwegh, poet, revolutionist (1817–1875)
- Ferdinand von Hochstetter, geologist, naturalist (1829–1884)
- Albert Schäffle, economist, sociologist, politician (1831–1903)
- Eberhard Nestle, theologian, orientalist (1851–1913)
- Hans Vaihinger, philosopher (1852–1933)
- Johannes Hieber, politician (1862–1951)
- Karl Heim, theologian (1874–1958)
- Edwin Hoernle, politician (1883–1952)

== See also ==
- University of Tübingen

== Sources ==
- Martin Leube: Das Tübinger Stift: 1770 – 1950; Geschichte des Tübinger Stifts. Stuttgart, Steinkopf (1954)
- Reinhard Breymayer: Freimaurer vor den Toren des Tübinger Stifts: Masonischer Einfluss auf Hölderlin? In: Tubingensia: Impulse zur Stadt- und Universitätsgeschichte. Festschrift für Wilfried Setzler zum 65. Geburtstag. Hrsg. von Sönke Lorenz und Volker [Karl] Schäfer in Verbindung mit dem Institut für Geschichtliche Landeskunde und Historische Hilfswissenschaften der Universität Tübingen. Redaktion: Susanne Borgards. (Ostfildern:) Jan Thorbecke Verlag, 2008 (Tübinger Bausteine zur Landesgeschichte, 10), pp. 355–395. ISBN 978-3-7995-5510-4.
