= Philipp Nicodemus Frischlin =

German philologist, writer, mathematician and astronomer

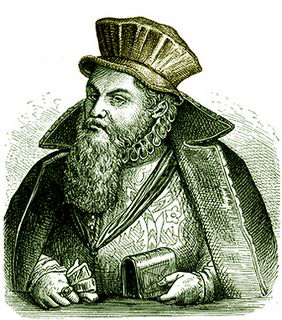
Nicodemus Frischlin

Philipp Nicodemus Frischlin (also spelled Nikodemus) (22 September 1547 – 29 November 1590) was a German philologist, poet, playwright, mathematician, and astronomer, born at Erzingen, today part of Balingen in Württemberg, where his father was parish minister.

== Life ==
He was educated as a scholar of "Tübinger Stift" at the university of Tübingen, where in 1568 he was promoted to the chair of poetry and history. In 1575 for his comedy of Rebecca, which he read at Regensburg before the emperor Maximilian II, he was rewarded with the laureateship, and in 1577 he was made an imperial count palatine (Comes palatinus Caesareus) or Pfalzgraf.

In 1582 his unguarded language and reckless life made it necessary that he should leave Tübingen, and he accepted a mastership at Laibach in Carniola (nowadays Ljubljana in Slovenia), which he held for about two years. Shortly after his return to the university in 1584, he was threatened with a criminal prosecution on a charge of immoral conduct, and the threat led to his withdrawal to Frankfurt am Main in 1587. For eighteen months he taught in the Brunswick gymnasium, and he appears also to have resided occasionally at Strasbourg, Marburg and Mainz. From the last-named city he wrote certain libelous letters, which led to his being arrested in March 1590. He was imprisoned in the fortress of Hohenurach, near Reutlingen, where, on the night of 29 November 1590, he was killed by a fall in attempting to let himself down from the window of his cell.

== Work ==
Frischlin's prolific and versatile genius produced a great variety of works, which entitle him to some rank both among poets and among scholars. In his Latin verse he often successfully imitated the classical models; his comedies are not without freshness and vivacity; and some of his versions and commentaries, particularly those on the Georgics and Bucolics of Virgil, though now well-nigh forgotten, were important contributions to the scholarship of his time. There is no collected edition of his works, but his Opera poetica were published twelve times between 1535 and 1636.

Among those most widely known may be mentioned:

- the Hebraeis (1590), a Latin epic based on the Scripture history of the Jews
- the Elegiaca (1601), his collected lyric poetry, in twenty-two books
- the Opera scenica (1604) consisting of six comedies and two tragedies (among the former, Julius Caesar redivivus, completed 1584)
- the Grammatica Latina (1585)
- the versions of Callimachus and Aristophanes
- the commentaries on Persius and Virgil

See the monograph of David Friedrich Strauss (Leben und Schriften des Dichters und Philologen Frischlin, 1856).

== Literature ==
- D. F. Strauß, "Leben und Schriften des Dichters und Philologen Nicodemus Frischlin", 1856.
- S. Holtz, D. Mertens (Hsg.), "Nicodemus Frischlin (1547 - 1590), poetische und prosaische Praxis unter den Bedingungen des konfessionellen Zeitalters", Stuttgart, Bad Cannstatt 1999.
- Gustav Bebermeyer: Nicodemus Frischlin. In: Neue Deutsche Biographie (NDB). Bd. 5, S. 620
