= Karl August Auberlen =

German theologian (1824–1864)

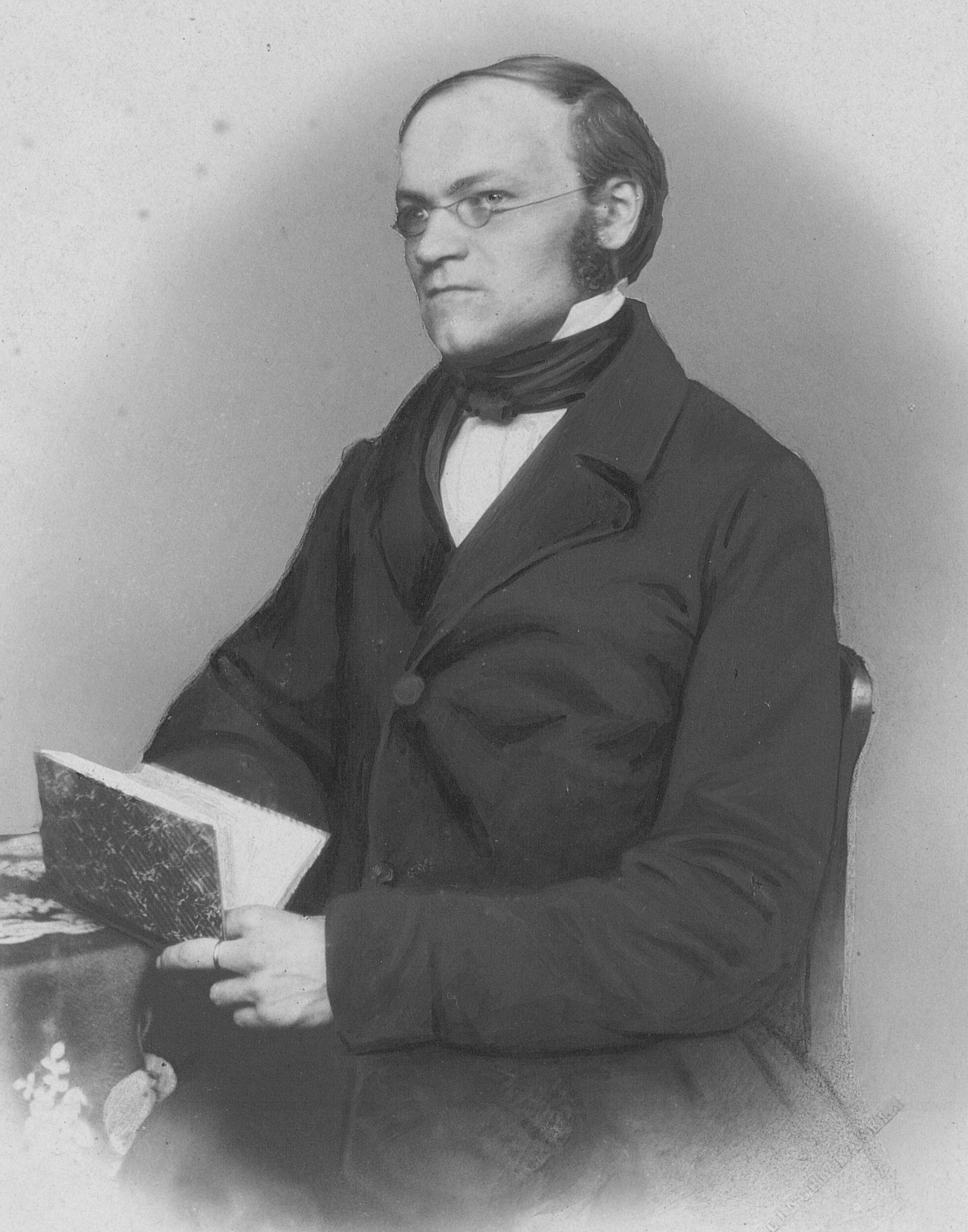
- Born: November 19, 1824; Fellbach, Kingdom of Württemberg
- Died: May 2, 1864 (aged 39); Basel, Switzerland
- Education: University of Tübingen
- Occupations: Theologian, university professor
- Era: 19th-century philosophy and theology
- Notable work: Der Prophet Daniel und die Offenbarung Johannis (1854); Die göttliche Offenbarung (1861)
- Movement: Lutheran theology

Karl August Auberlen (19 November 1824 – 2 May 1864) was a German Lutheran theologian.

== Life ==
He was born at Fellbach, near Stuttgart, 19 November 1824. He studied in the seminary of Blaubeuren 1837-41, and theology at Tübingen 1841-45. He became repentant in theology at Tübingen 1849, and professor at Basel 1851. As a young man he was attracted by the views of Goethe and Hegel and enthusiastic for the criticism of Ferdinand Christian Baur; but he later became an adherent of the old Württemberg circle of theologians, of Johann Albrecht Bengel, Friedrich Christoph Oetinger, Lothar Roos, and others. He died at Basel on 2 May 1864.

== Works ==
He published:

- Die Theosophie Oetingers (Tübingen, 1847);
- Der Prophet Daniel und die Offenbarung Johannis (Basel, 1854; Eng. transl., by Adolph Saphir, The Prophecies of Daniel and the Revelation, Edinburgh, 1874; 2d German ed., 1857);
- Die götttiche Offenbarung (i, Basel, 1861; Eng. transl., with memoir, The Divine Revelation: An Essay in Defence of the Faith, Edinburgh, 1867).

A volume of sermons appeared in 1845; a volume of lectures on the Christian faith in 1861.

== Notes ==
Attribution
