= Albert Gollhofer =

German sport scientist

Albert Gollhofer (born 24 March 1954) is a German sport scientist and academic scholar.

== Life ==
Born in Fellbach, Gollhofer studied sports science, physics and performance physiology at the Albert-Ludwigs-Universität Freiburg. In 1986, his doctoral thesis on "Components of fast strength performance in the stretch-shortening cycle" was accepted in Freiburg, between 1988 and 1994 he led a project funded by the Deutsche Forschungsgemeinschaft. From 1993 to 2000, Gollhofer worked at the University of Stuttgart as a professor of biomechanics.

In September 2000, he took up a position at the Albert-Ludwigs-Universität Freiburg as a professor in the department of exercise and movement sciences, becoming director and full professor at the Institute of Sport and Sport Science. From 2014 to 2016, Gollhofer was dean of the faculty of economics and behavioural sciences. From 2007 to 2009, Gollhofer held the position of chairman of the European College of Sport Science. From 2000 to 2002, Gollhofer was president of the German Society for Biomechanics. In 2013 and 2019, Gollhofer was awarded the IDA Prize of the Albert-Ludwigs-University of Freiburg, respectively, together with colleagues.

Gollhofer's research interests include adaptation mechanisms to training in amateur and elite sport, methods for determining functional performance in sport, technique and condition diagnostics, neuromuscular performance profiles, the relationship between conditional performance and age, functional joint stability, injury prevention and orthopaedic biomechanics. Gollhofer co-authored the book "Einführung in die Sport- und Leistungsmedizin" and edited the "Handbuch Sportbiomechanik" together with Erich Müller.
