= Kappelberg Tunnel =

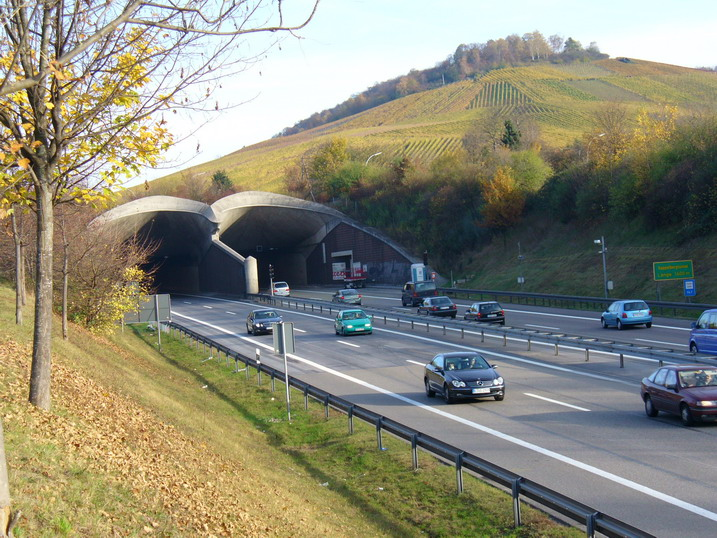

Overview
- Location: Rems-Murr-Kreis, Germany
- Coordinates: 48.80°N 9.28°E
- Route: Bundesstraße 14

Technical
- Length: 1.585 km
- Operating speed: 100 km/h

The Kappelberg Tunnel is a road tunnel on the Bundesstraße 14, located near the city of Stuttgart, Germany.

Following failings identified by the European Tunnel Assessment Programme, the tunnel underwent a €12 million refurbishment programme, which resulted in a rating of "very good" in 2006.
