= Ferdinand Christian Baur =

German theologian (1792–1860)

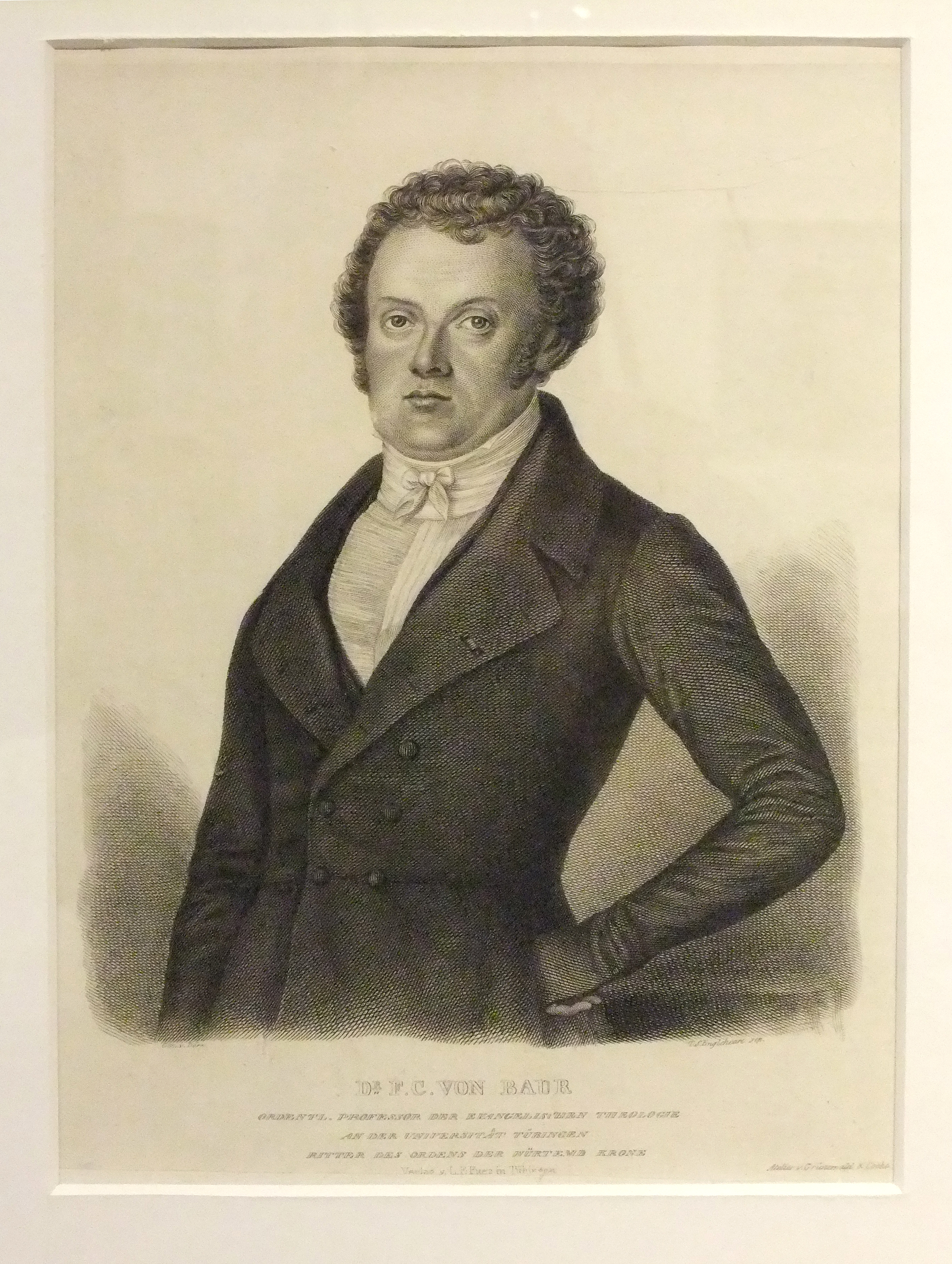
- Dr. F. C. von Baur (steel engraving by Christoph Friedrich Dörr, 1830s)
- Born: 21 June 1792; Schmiden, Duchy of Württemberg
- Died: 2 December 1860 (aged 68); Tübingen, Kingdom of Württemberg

Academic background
- Education: Tübinger Stift

Academic work
- Discipline: Theology; New Testament
- School or tradition: Tübingen School
- Institutions: University of Tübingen
- Notable students: David Strauss; Eduard Zeller

Ferdinand Christian Baur (German: [baʊɐ]; 21 June 1792 – 2 December 1860) was a German Protestant theologian and founder and leader of the (new) Tübingen School of theology (named for the University of Tübingen where Baur studied and taught). Following Hegel's theory of dialectic, Baur argued that second century Christianity represented the synthesis of two opposing theses: Jewish Christianity (Petrine Christianity) and Gentile Christianity (Pauline Christianity). This and the rest of Baur's work had a profound impact on higher criticism of biblical and related texts.

Adolf Hilgenfeld followed Baur's lead and edited the Tübingen School's journal, though he was less radical than Baur. A patristic scholar and philosopher at Tübingen, Albert Schwegler gave the School's theories their most vigorous expression. "The school was at the height of its influence in the 1840s, but it soon lost its prestige through the discrepancy between its axioms and historical fact."

== Early life ==
Baur was born at Schmiden, near Cannstatt. After training at the theological seminary of Blaubeuren, he went in 1809 to the Tübinger Stift. There he studied for a time under Ernst Bengel, grandson of the eminent New Testament critic, Johann Albrecht Bengel, and at this early stage in his career he seems to have been under the influence of the old Tübingen School. But at the same time the philosophers Johann Gottlieb Fichte and Friedrich Schelling were creating a wide and deep impression. In 1817 Baur returned to the theological seminary at Blaubeuren as professor. This move marked a turning-point in his life, for he now set to work on the investigations on which his reputation rests. He had already, in 1817, written a review of G. P. C. Kaiser's Biblische Theologie for Bengel's Archiv für Theologie (ii. 656); its tone was moderate and conservative.

== Early works ==
When, a few years after his appointment at Blaubeuren, he published his first important work, Symbolik und Mythologie oder die Naturreligion des Altertums ("Symbol and mythology: the natural religion of Antiquity", 1824–1825), it became evident that he had made a deeper study of philosophy, and had come under the influence of Schelling and more particularly of Friedrich Schleiermacher. The learning of the work was fully recognized, and in 1826 the author was called to Tübingen as professor of theology. It is with Tübingen that his greatest literary achievements are associated. His earlier publications here treated of mythology and the history of dogma. Das manichäische Religionssystem ("The Manichaean religious system") appeared in 1831, Apollonius von Tyana in 1832, Die christliche Gnosis ("Christian Gnosis") in 1835, and Über das Christliche im Platonismus oder Socrates und Christus ("On Christianity in Platonism: Socrates and Christ") in 1837. As Otto Pfleiderer (Pflederer 1890 p. 285) observes, "the choice not less than the treatment of these subjects is indicative of the large breadth of view and the insight of the historian into the comparative history of religion."

== Simon Magus and Paul ==
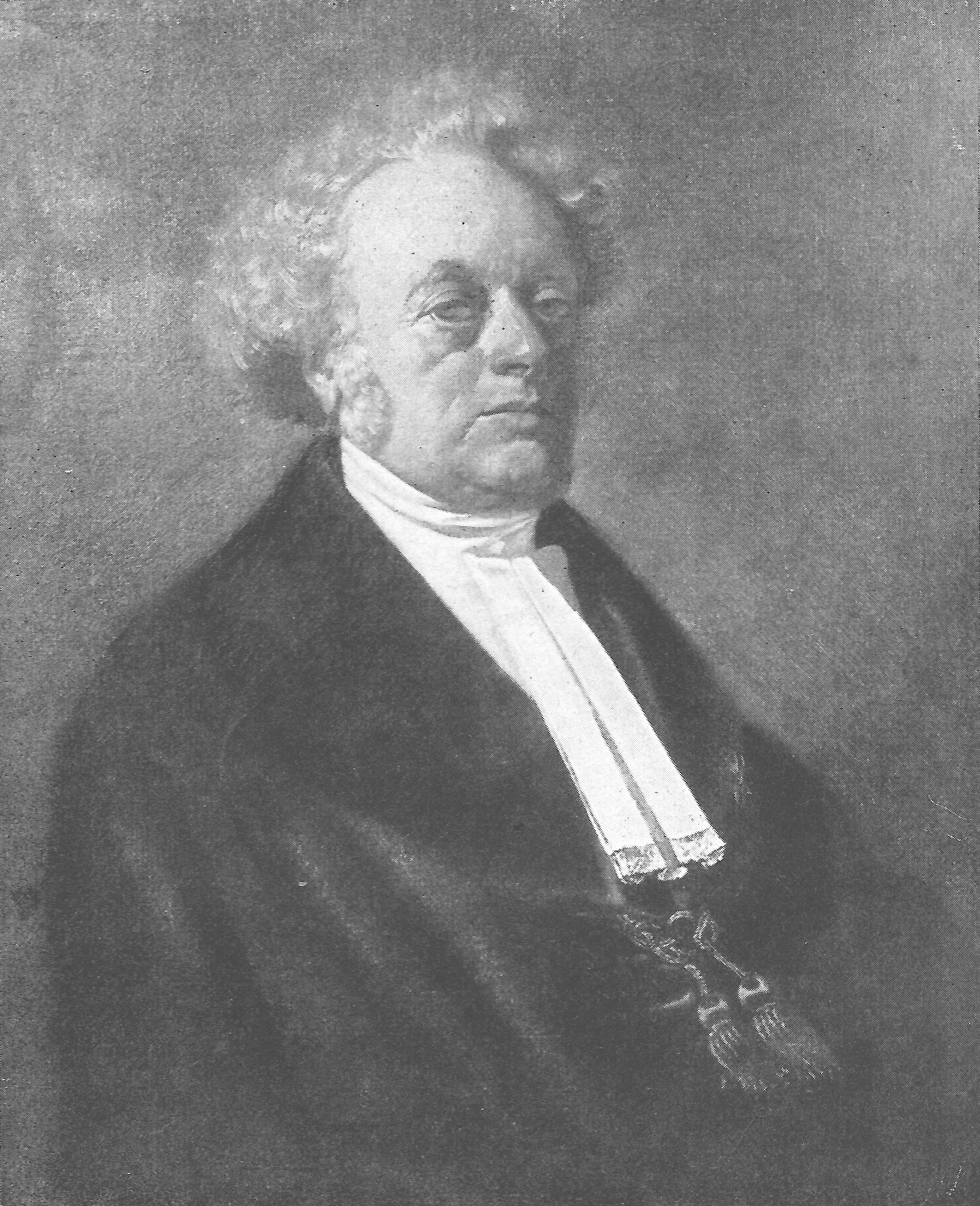
Ferdinand Christian Baur

Baur rested his ideas about the New Testament on the Clementines, and his ideas about the Clementines on St. Epiphanius, who found the writings used by an Ebionite sect in the 4th century. This Judeo-Christian sect at that date rejected St. Paul as an apostate. It was assumed that this 4th century opinion represented the Christianity of the Twelve Apostles; Paulinism was originally a heresy, and a schism from the Jewish Christianity of James and Peter and the rest; Marcion was a leader of the Pauline sect in its survival in the 2nd century, using only the Pauline Gospel, St. Luke (in its original form), and the Epistles of St. Paul (without the Pastoral Epistles). The Clementine literature had its first origin in the Apostolic Age, and belonged to the original Jewish, Petrine, legal Church. It is directed wholly against St. Paul and his sect. Simon Magus never existed; it is a nickname for St. Paul. The Acts of the Apostles, compiled in the 2nd century, have borrowed their mention of Simon from the earliest form of the Clementines. Catholicism under the presidency of Rome was the result of the adjustment between the Petrine and Pauline sections of the Church in the second half of the 2nd century. The Fourth Gospel is a monument of this reconciliation, in which Rome took a leading part, having invented the fiction that both Peter and Paul were the founders of her Church, both having been martyred at Rome, and on the same day, in perfect union.

Throughout the middle of the 19th century this theory, in many forms, was dominant in Germany. The demonstration, mainly by English scholars, of the impossibility of the late dates ascribed to the New Testament documents (four Epistles of St. Paul and the Apocalypse were the only documents generally admitted as being of early date), and the proofs of the authenticity of the Apostolic Fathers and of the use of St. John's Gospel by Justin, Papias, and Ignatius, gradually brought Baur's theories into discredit. Of the original school, Adolf Hilgenfeld may be considered the last survivor (died 1907). He was induced to admit that Simon Magus was a real personage, though he persisted that in the Clementines he is meant for St. Paul. In 1847 Hilgenfeld dated the original nucleus of the Clementine literature (Kerygmata Petrou) soon after the Jewish war of 70; successive revisions of it were anti-Basilidian, anti-Valentinian, and anti-Marcionite respectively. Baur placed the completed form, ‘‘H’’, soon after the middle of the 2nd century, and Schliemann (1844) agreed, placing ‘‘R’’, as a revision, between 211 and 230. Other writers dated both ‘‘H’’ and ‘‘R’’ to between the 2nd and 4th centuries:

- R. 2nd century: Sixtus Senensis (Sixtus of Siena) (1520-1569), David Blondel (David Blondellus Catalaunensis) (1590-1655), Jean-Baptiste Cotelier (1629-1686), William Cave (1637-1713), Casimir Oudin (1638-1717), Noël Alexandre (Natalis Alexander) (1639-1724), Denis-Nicolas Le Nourry (Nourri) (1647-1724), Johann Georg Heinsius (d. 1733), Ernst Friedrich Karl Rosenmüller (1768-1835), Christian Wilhelm Flügge (1773-1828), Karl Gottlieb Bretschneider (1776-1848), Johann Georg Veit Engelhardt (1791-1855), Johann Karl Ludwig Gieseler (1792-1854), Friedrich August Gottreu Tholuck (1799-1877), and August Friedrich Gfrörer (1803-1861).
- R. 2nd or 3rd century: Schröck, Stark, Lumper, Krabbe, Locherer, Gersdorf.
- R. 3rd century: Strunzius (on Bardesanes, 1710), Weismann (17l8), Mosheim, Kleuker, Schmidt (Kirchengesch.)
- R. 4th century: Corrodi, Lentz (Dogmengesch.).
- H. 2nd century (beginning): Credner, Bretschneider, Kern, Rothe.
- H. 2nd century: Clericus, Beausobre, Flügge, Münscher, Hoffmann, Döllinger, Hilgers; (middle of 2nd) Hase.
- H. end of 2nd century: Schröck, Cölln, Gieseler (3rd ed.), Schenkel, Gfrörer, Lücke.
- H. 3rd century: Mill, Mosheim, Gallandi, Gieseler (2nd ed.).
- H. 2nd or 3rd century: Neander, Krabbe, Baur, Ritter, Paniel, Dähne.
- H. 4th century: Lentz.

== Hegel's influence ==
Meantime Baur had exchanged one master in philosophy for another, Schleiermacher for Hegel. In doing so, he had adopted completely the Hegelian philosophy of history. "Without philosophy," he has said, "history is always for me dead and dumb." The change of view is illustrated clearly in the essay, published in the Tübinger Zeitschrift for 1831, on the Christ-party in the Corinthian Church, Die Christuspartei in der korinthischen Gemeinde, der Gegensatz des paulinischen und petrinischen Christentums in der ältesten Kirche, der Apostel Petrus in Rom, the trend of which is suggested by the title (in English, 'The Christ Party in the Corinthian Community, the Opposition of Pauline and Petrine Christianity in the earliest Church, the apostle Peter in Rome'). Baur contends that the apostle Paul was opposed in Corinth by a Jewish Christian party that wished to set up its own form of Christian religion instead of his universal Christianity. He found traces of a keen conflict of parties in the post-apostolic age, which have passed into the mainstream of Early Christian historiography.

== Pauline epistles ==
The theory is further developed in a later work (1835, the year in which David Strauss' Leben Jesu was published), Über die sogenannten Pastoralbriefe. In this Baur attempts to prove that the false teachers mentioned in the Second Epistle to Timothy and Epistle to Titus are the Gnostics, particularly the Marcionites, of the 2nd century, and consequently that the Pastoral Epistles were produced in the middle of the 2nd century in opposition to Gnosticism.

He next proceeded to investigate other Pauline epistles and the Acts of the Apostles in the same manner, publishing his results in 1845 under the title Paulus, der Apostel Jesu Christi, sein Leben und Wirken, seine Briefe und seine Lehre. In this he contends that only the Epistle to the Galatians, First and Second Epistle to the Corinthians and Epistle to the Romans are genuinely Pauline, and that the Paul of the Acts of the Apostles is a different person from the Paul of these genuine Epistles, the author being a Paulinist who, with an eye to the different parties in the Church, is at pains to represent Peter as far as possible as a Paulinist and Paul as far as possible as a Petrinist.

== Early Christian conflicts ==
We are rich in our Christian faith, we become poor if we enter into a compromise with anti-Trinitarianism in any form. F. C. Baur, the father of the Tubingen School, who cannot be accused of being a friend of traditional orthodoxy, was correct in his statement that Christianity would have lost its character as the universal religion of mankind if Arianism had been triumphant at Nicea.

— Modern Anti-Trinitarianism and Islam, 1912

Baur was prepared to apply his theory to the whole of the New Testament; in the words of H. S. Nash, "he carried a sweeping hypothesis into the examination of the New Testament." He considers those writings alone genuine in which the conflict between Jewish-Christians and Gentile-Christians is clearly marked. In his Kritische Untersuchungen über die kanonischen Evangelien, ihr Verhältniss zu einander, ihren Charakter und Ursprung (1847) he turns his attention to the Gospels, and here again finds that the authors were conscious of the conflict of parties; the Gospels reveal a mediating or conciliatory tendency (Tendenz) on the part of the writers or redactors. The Gospels, in fact, are adaptations or redactions of an older Gospel, such as the Gospel of the Hebrews, of Peter, of the Egyptians, or of the Ebionites. The Petrine Matthew bears the closest relationship to this original Gospel (Urevangelium); the Pauline Luke is later and arose independently; Mark represents a still later development according to Baur; the account in John is idealistic: it "does not possess historical truth, and cannot and does not really lay claim to it."

Baur's theory starts with the supposition that Christianity was gradually developed out of Judaism, see also List of events in early Christianity. Before it could become a universal religion, it had to struggle with Jewish limitations and to overcome them. The early Christians were Jewish-Christians, to whom Jesus was the Messiah. Paul, on the other hand, represented a breach with Judaism, the Temple, and the Law. Thus there was some antagonism between the Jewish apostles Peter, James and John, and Paul the "Apostle to the Gentiles", and this struggle continued down to the middle of the 2nd century. In short, the conflict between Petrinism and Paulinism is, as Karl Schwarz puts it, the key to the literature of the 1st and 2nd centuries.

== Theology ==
Baur was a theologian and historian as well as a Biblical critic. As early as 1834 he published a strictly theological work, Gegensatz des Katholicismus und Protestantismus nach den Prinzipien und Hauptdogmen der beiden Lehrbegriffe, a strong defence of Protestantism on the lines of Schleiermacher's Glaubenslehre, and a vigorous reply to J. Möhler's Symbolik (1833). This was followed by his larger histories of dogma, Die christliche Lehre von der Versöhnung in ihrer geschichtlichen Entwicklung bis auf die neueste Zeit (1838), Die christliche Lehre von der Dreieinigkeit und Menschwerdung Gottes in ihrer geschichtlichen Entwicklung (3 vols., 1841–1843), and the Lehrbuch der christlichen Dogmengeschichte (1847). The value of these works is impaired somewhat by Baur's habit of making the history of dogma conform to the formulae of Hegel's philosophy, a procedure "which only served to obscure the truth and profundity of his conception of history as a true development of the human mind" (Pfleiderer). Baur, however, soon came to attach more importance to personality, and to distinguish more carefully between religion and philosophy. The change is noticeable in his Epochen der kirchlichen Geschichtschreibung (1852), Das Christenthum und die christliche Kirche der drei ersten Jahrhunderte (1853), and Die christliche Kirche von Anfang des vierten bis zum Ende das sechsten Jahrhunderts (1859), works preparatory to his Kirchengeschichte, in which the change of view is specially pronounced.

== Death and posthumous publication ==
Baur died, aged 68, in Tübingen. The Kirchengeschichte was published in five volumes during the years 1853-1863, partly by Baur himself, partly by his son, Ferdinand Baur, and his son-in-law, Eduard Zeller, from notes and lectures which the author left behind him. Pfleiderer describes this work, especially the first volume, as a classic for all time. "Taken as a whole, it is the first thorough and satisfactory attempt to explain the rise of Christianity and the Church on strictly historical lines, i.e. as a natural development of the religious spirit of our race under the combined operation of various human causes" (Development of Theology, p. 288). Baur's lectures on the history of dogma, Ausführlichere Vorlesungen uber die christliche Dogmengeschichte, were published later by his son (1865–1868).

== Tübingen School ==
The Tübingen School was at the height of its influence in the 1840s, but lost ground to later historical analysis. Since Adolf von Harnack proposed very early dates for the synoptics and Acts (c. 1910), the Tübingen School has been generally abandoned.

== Sources ==
- Otto Pfleiderer (1890). Development of Theology
