= Kappelberg (Baden-Württemberg) =

Hill in Baden-Württemberg, Germany

Coordinates: 48°47′47″N 9°17′03″E

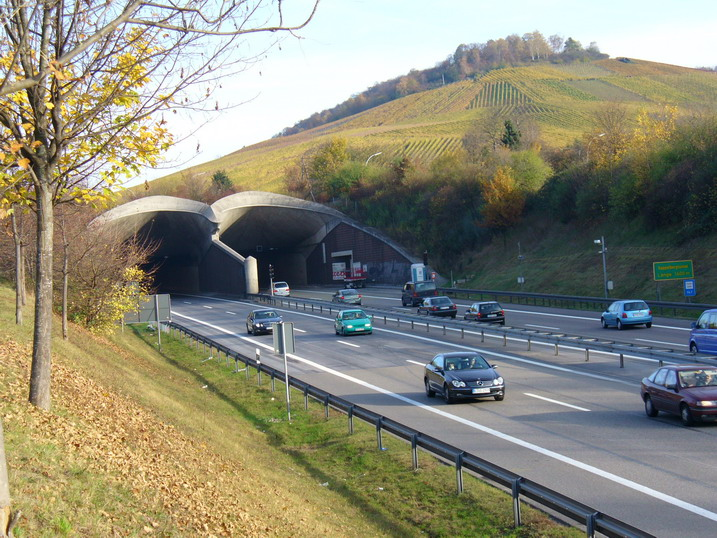
- Kappelberg tunnel with Kappelberg in the background

Highest point
- Elevation: 469 m (1,539 ft)

Geography
- Location: Baden-Württemberg, Germany

The Kappelberg is a hill in Baden-Württemberg, Germany.
