= Tübingen School =

19th-century scientific school

The Tübingen School (German: Tübinger Schule) is a scientific school of Protestant and Roman Catholic theologians who developed the foundations for the historical-critical method of biblical research at the University of Tübingen in the 19th century.

== Protestant school ==
The Tübingen School emerged around 1826 in the circle of the Protestant theologian Ferdinand Christian Baur, who worked as Professor of Church and Dogmatic History from 1826 to 1860 and as Rector of the University of Tübingen in 1841 and 1842. Baur and his students laid the foundations for the historical-critical method of biblical research in the 19th century. Baur's students included, among others, David Friedrich Strauß, Johann Tobias Beck, Karl Reinhold von Köstlin and Baur's student Eduard Zeller.

Beck, however, rejected Baur's speculative view and founded a more biblically based school, while Albert Schwegler switched from theology to philology in 1841 following conflicts with Württemberg church authorities.

The Protestant Tübingen school was involved in a long and fierce dispute with its Tübingen colleague Heinrich Ewald. Albrecht Ritschl, who strove to strike a balance between orthodox and liberal theology, ultimately parted ways with the Tübingen school. Around 1860, the Anglican New Testament scholar and philologist Brooke Foss Westcott took up Baur's methods and developed a historically sharpened critical method of biblical research.

Some historians distinguish between "older" and "younger" schools:

- The Older Tübingen school (German: Ältere Tübinger Schule, Protestant), founded by Gottlob Christian Storr (1746-1805). It essentially represented Kant's supernaturalism, according to which divine revelation is above all human reason. Therefore, the formal authority of the Bible also has its place in research.
- The New (or Younger) Tübingen School (German: Jüngere Tübinger Schule, Protestant), founded around 1826 by F.C. Baur. In contrast to the older school, it advocates a historical-critical theology free of dogmatic presuppositions.

== Catholic school ==
Roman Catholic theologians with a similar line of research to Baur were Johann Sebastian von Drey (1777-1853), Johann Adam Möhler (1796-1838), and Johann Baptist von Hirscher (1788-1865), as well as Franz Anton Staudenmaier (1800-1856) and Johannes von Kuhn (1806-1887). From 1819 they engaged in controversial discussions with Baur and his students, which is why the Catholic Tübingen school can be clearly distinguished from the Protestant school. Inspired by the philosophy of Georg Wilhelm Friedrich Hegel, it also dealt with the issue of divine revelation vs. human reason. In doing so, it endeavored to unite historical and speculative theology.
