= Kernen =

German municipality

Kernen im Remstal
- Municipality
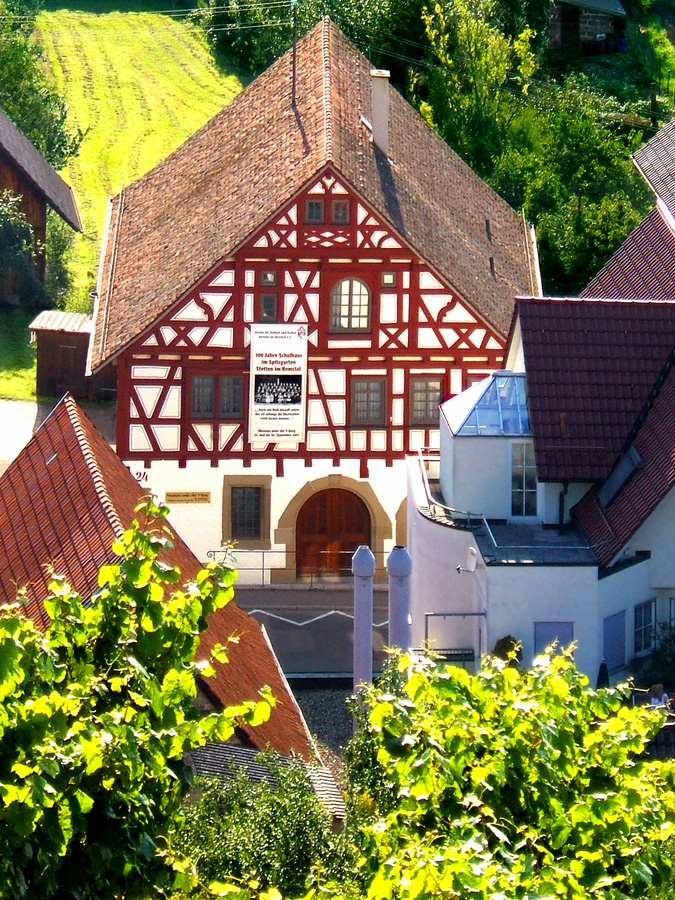
- The Y-Burg Museum

- Coat of arms

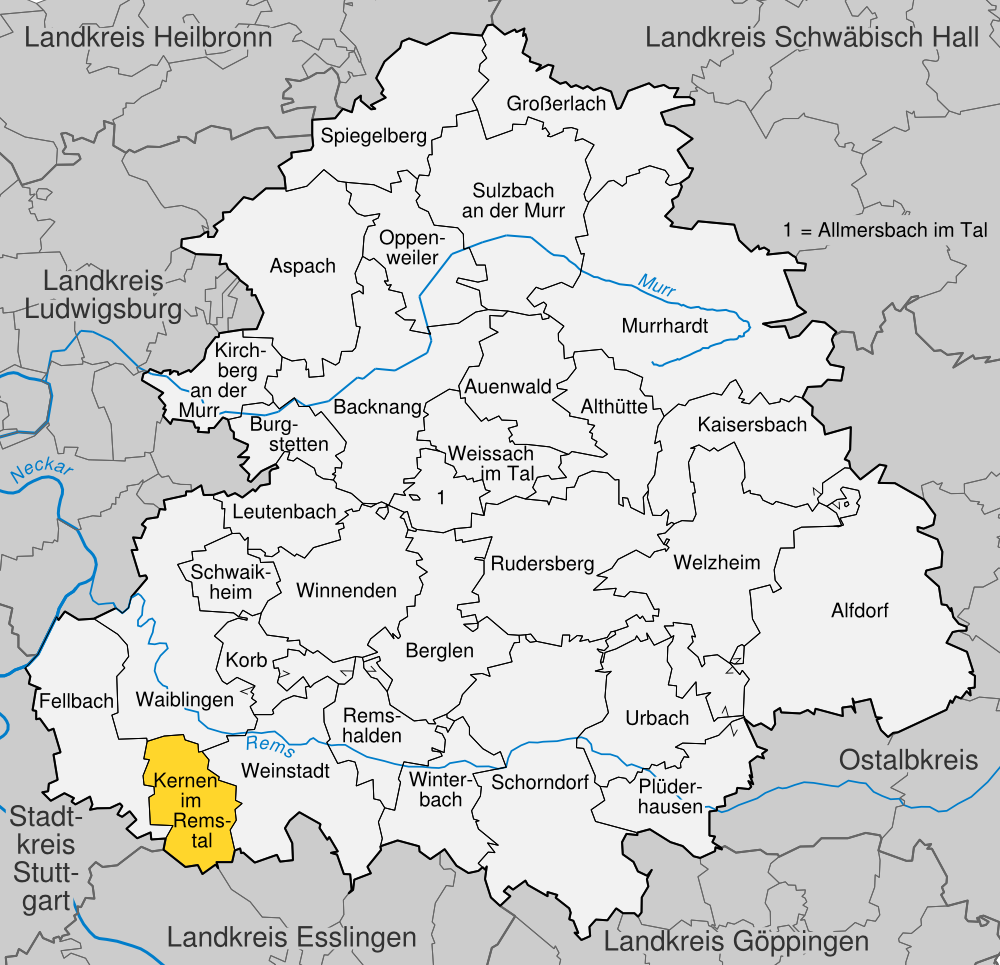
- Location of Kernen im Remstal within Rems-Murr-Kreis district
- Interactive map of Kernen im Remstal
- Location within Germany Location within Baden-Württemberg
- Coordinates: 48°48′24″N 09°19′18″E
- Country: Germany
- State: Baden-Württemberg
- Admin. region: Stuttgart
- District: Rems-Murr-Kreis
- Subdivisions: 2 Ortsteile

Area
  - Total: 15.04 km^{2} (5.81 sq mi)
- Elevation: 270 m (890 ft)

Population (2025-12-31)
  - Total: 15,907
  - Density: 1,058/km^{2} (2,739/sq mi)
- Time zone: UTC+01:00 (CET)
  - Summer (DST): UTC+02:00 (CEST)
- Postal codes: 71394
- Dialling codes: 07151
- Vehicle registration: WN, BK
- Website: www.kernen.de

Kernen im Remstal (German pronunciation: [ˈkɛʁnən ʔɪm ˈʁɛmstaːl], lit. 'Kernen in the Rems Valley') is a municipality in the Rems-Murr district of Baden-Württemberg, Germany. It was formed in January 1975 by the union of the towns of Stetten im Remstal and Rommelshausen. Its name was initially Stetten-Rommelshausen, but a community referendum resulted in its being changed to Kernen im Remstal, after a local hill.

== Name ==
The name "Kernen im Remstal" was decided by the inhabitants of the municipality and refers to the Kernen, the highest point in the municipality. The previous name, used since the formation of the municipality, was "Stetten-Rommelshausen".

== History ==
Stetten im Remstal and Rommelshausen joined into a single municipality on 20 September 1975 as part of the 1968-75 Baden-Württemberg municipal reforms.

=== Rommelshausen ===
Rommelshausen was connected to European railways in 1861 via the Stuttgart-Bad Cannstatt–Aalen railway, and this connection has greatly enabled the town's growth. It began a period of urban sprawl after from 1945 and into the 1970s to the northwest and southeast. Further developments in the 1990s spread Rommelshausen even further to the south.

=== Stetten ===
Stetten also enjoyed a period of growth after World War II and spread to the north and west.

== Geography ==
The municipality (Gemeinde) of Kernen im Remstal is found in the Rems-Murr district of Baden-Württemberg, a state of the Federal Republic of Germany. Kernen is lies at the southern edge of the district, along its border with Stuttgart and the district of Esslingen am Neckar. The municipality is physically located in the Neckar basin. Elevation above sea level in the municipal area ranges from a high of 493 meters (1,617 ft) Normalnull (NN) to a low of 239 meters (784 ft) NN.

== Demographics ==
Population development:

Year	Inhabitants
1990	14,235
2001	14,858
2011	14,745
2021	15,314

== Politics ==
Kernen has two boroughs (Ortsteile): Rommelshausen and Stetten.

=== Coat of arms ===
The municipal coat of arms for Kernen shows six diamonds, the upper three blue and the lower three black, upon a field of yellow. The diamonds are holdovers from the coat of arms of the municipality of Stetten im Remstal, which was itself derived from the arms of the House of Teck, which had been used outright by Rommelshausen. This coat of arms, and an accompanying municipal flag, were awarded to Kernen by the Rems-Murr district office on 3 January 1977.

== Transportation ==
Kernen is connected to Germany's system of roadways by Bundesstraße 29 and to its system of railways by the Stuttgart S-Bahn railway's S2 line, which has a station in the municipality at Rommelshausen. Local public transportation is provided by the Verkehrs- und Tarifverbund Stuttgart.

== People ==
- Karl Mauch (1837-1875), German explorer
- Otto Pfleiderer (1839-1908), German protestant theologian
- Jörg Schlaich (1934-2001), German engineer
- Wolfgang Dietrich (born 1948), German businessman
- Dorothee Schlegel (born 1959), German politician
