= Alice Gurschner =

Austrian writer (1869–1944)

Alice Gurschner (née Pollak, 8 October 1869, Vienna – 26 March 1944, Vienna) was an Austrian writer. She wrote largely under the masculine pen name Paul Althof. She was married to the sculptor Gustav Gurschner.

== Biography ==
Pollak grew up in a middle-class Jewish family in Vienna, and received private lessons in her secondary school subjects, music and modern languages. In 1897 she married the sculptor Gustav Gurschner, a co-founder of the Vienna Secession, and had three children by him. Some of her work was published in the Secession magazine Ver Sacrum. Her family did not approve of her marriage to a Catholic. After the marriage, the Gurschners lived in Paris for two years. After her father's death in 1905, she converted to Catholicism and became a monarchist and an Austro-Hungarian nationalist.

As 'Paul Althof', she had newspaper and magazine articles published in the Neue Wiener Journal, the Illustritre Wiener Extrablatt, the Wiener Fremden-Blatt, the Österreichische Volks-Zeitung and the Berliner Börsen-Courier.

She was a member of the Austrian Association of Women Artists.

== Works ==
- Paul Althof: Drei Häuser: Roman aus Alt-Österreich (Three Houses: A Novel of Old Austria). Europa-Verlag, Vienna, 1938
- Paul Althof: Semiramis: Ein Märchen für Könige (Semiramis: A Fairy Tale for Kings). Vienna: Heller, 1914
- Paul Althof: Der heilige Kuß (The Holy Kiss). Dramatic poem in three acts, Stuttgart & Berlin: Cotta, 1911
- Paul Althof: Die wunderbare Brücke und andere Geschichten (The Wonderful Bridge and other stories), Stuttgart: Cotta, 1908
- Paul Althof: Das verlorene Wort (The Lost World). Novel, Stuttgart & Berlin: J.G. Cotta Nachf, 1907
- Kunsthyänen (Art Hyenas). Drama in three acts (manuscript), Berlin: Bloch, 1903
- Paul Althof: Die schlafende Seele (The Sleeping Soul). Short story, Berlin 1900
- Paul Althof: Coghetta, Berlin: Freund & Jeckel, 1894
- Paul Althof: Die Asolanen (The Asolan), Vienna: C. Daberkow, 1893
- Paul Althof: Gernrode. Poetische Erzählung aus dem zehnten Jahrhundert (Gernrode: Poetic Tale of the Tenth Century), Leipzig 1890
