= Herbert Gurschner =

British painter

- Born: 27 August 1901; Innsbruck, Austria-Hungary
- Died: 10 January 1975 (aged 73); London, England
- Occupation: Painter

Herbert Gurschner (27 August 1901 – 10 January 1975) was a British painter. His work was part of the painting event in the art competition at the 1948 Summer Olympics. He was a nephew of the Austrian sculptors Gustav Gurschner and Emil Gurschner.
