= Oesterreichische Volks-Zeitung =

Austrian newspaper

The Österreichische Volks-Zeitung (German pronunciation: [ˌøːstɐʁaɪçɪʃə ˈfɔlksˌtsaɪtʊŋ], lit. 'Austrian People's Newspaper') emerged from the Konstitutionellen Vorstadt-Zeitung (lit. 'Constitutional Suburban Newspaper'; 16 April 1865 – 31 May 1874) and was published from 19 August 1888 to 13 November 1918. It was published daily in a format of approx. 40 × 30 cm (2°). The imprint names Gustav Hinterhuber as editor and Wilhelm Feldbaum as printer.

From 1 April 1905, a subsidiary edition appeared – the "Kleine österreichische Volkszeitung" (lit. 'Little Austrian People's Newspaper'), which was also published until 13 November 1918.

The Österreichische Volks-Zeitung was continued under the title Kleine Volkszeitung (lit. 'Little People's Newspaper'; 1918–1944).
