= Arnold Ehrlich =

Polish-American biblical scholar and teacher

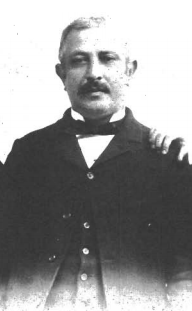
Arnold Ehrlich

Arnold Bogumil Ehrlich (15 January 1848 in Volodovka, Brest-Litovsk – November 1919 in New Rochelle, New York) was a scholar of Jewish scripture in the late 19th and early 20th centuries. He is best known for his book Mik'ra Kiph'shuto ("The Plain Meaning of the Bible") in three Hebrew volumes published from 1899 to 1901, in which he sought to introduce a wider Hebrew audience to modern textual criticism of the Bible, and as a formative intellectual influence on the young Mordecai Kaplan. Ehrlich earned a living as a private tutor, and teaching at the Hebrew Preparatory School of the Temple Emanu-El Theological School of New York. However, he was never considered for a professorial post at Hebrew Union College, likely because of involvement as a young man with Hebrew translation of the New Testament used to proselytize Jewish converts to Christianity.

Ehrlich's exegetical work is an important contribution to modern biblical exegesis. Ehrlich's work was highly influential on the Jewish translation produced by the Jewish Publication Society in 1917 and its successor of 1962–82.

== Life ==
=== Early life ===
Ehrlich was born to a Jewish family in Volodovka, near Brest-Litovsk, in what is now Belarus. At an early age he studied German in his village, and read Moses Mendelssohn's Bible translation. He was married at fourteen and had one son named Mark. At seventeen, Ehrlich came to the conclusion that he could no longer abide with his current stringent environment and sought association with the wider fields of knowledge he hoped to find in Germany. His wife did not agree with the move or his liberal views, and she and their son did not go with him to Germany. He then went on his own and he entered school there to learn arithmetic, geography, and other elementary school subjects alongside boys of ten.

He then worked as a librarian in the Semitics department of the Berlin Royal Library. It was at this time in Germany that Ehrlich somehow came to the attention of Professor Franz Delitzsch, who engaged him as his amanuensis. They both worked in the missionary Institutum Judaicum, and at Delitzsch's insistence Ehrlich revised the Hebrew translation of the New Testament (10th Edition), meant for Christian missionary work among Jews - an action that he would come to regret. During this time he encountered the work of Julius Wellhausen and the concept of Biblical criticism, which led him to accept the documentary hypothesis. (Later, though, he wrote against the perceived destructiveness of higher criticism.) His deep familiarity with the Hebrew language led him to believe that the Bible could be understood only if one devoted oneself to its language and to an understanding of the Hebrew idiom through its cognates.

=== Teaching in America ===
Ehrlich emigrated from Hamburg, Germany in 1874 to Manhattan, New York, where he worked as a teacher in the Emanu-El Theological School of New York, associated with the Temple Emanu-El. His naturalization date is July 11, 1881, and he lists his occupation as "Teacher of Languages." His son, Mark, later followed him to Manhattan in 1885.

Ehrlich wrote in English and spoke it fluently and flawlessly, though with a slight accent. He was said to have known 39 languages, which included all the Semitic languages, all the languages of Western Europe except Finnish, all the Slavic language dialects, as well as Sanskrit, Latin, and Greek. He also took an interest in philology, and explained the relationship that Israelite and Canaanite civilizations bear to that of the Greeks upon the basis of language similarities and idiomatic likeness. He was a lover of the Greek classics and had a great knowledge of classical civilizations, as well as a special love for Arabic literature and poetry. Many of those who taught Arabic in the Semitics departments of universities came to Ehrlich for instruction. Among them was Professor Richard J. H. Gottheil of Columbia University, son of Gustav Gottheil, who claimed that Ehrlich had admitted to changing becoming a Christian in Germany and later regretting for it. Ehrlich never admitted to this, and the event is only claimed to have taken place by witnesses speaking in the late 19th century.

While in America Ehlich authored a biblical commentary called Mik'ra Kiph'shuto ("The Plain Meaning of the Bible"). It embodies his main point of view that the Bible itself is the best source for the knowledge of Hebrew as a language and for the ancient Hebraic ideas, despite the age of the scriptures and the findings of higher biblical criticism. He felt that somehow original meanings persisted and that the cross references or parallel passages often shed light upon obscure sentences as well as upon mistakes in the original biblical text.

During his years in the United States, Ehrlich was sought after by various Jewish scholars and students. He had a strong influence on the young Mordecai Kaplan, and also had affection for Louis Ginzberg of the Jewish Theological Seminary. He admired Ginzberg's thoroughness, his vast and comprehensive knowledge, and the originality of his mind. He also had a high regard for Professors Henry Malter and Max Margolis of the Dropsie College for Hebrew and Cognate Learning. Many older generation rabbis studied under him at one time or another, either at Emanu-El or as private pupils. Among them were Samuel Schulman, Leon Harrison, Bernard Drachman, Stephen S. Wise, and George Alexander Kohut whose father was Alexander Kohut. Another of his mature students was Isaac S. Moses, rabbi of the Central Synagogue. He was also sought by Christian pupils, such as Dr Charles Fagnani and Dr Julius Bewer, both members of the Union Theological Seminary Faculty. Ehrlich was especially interested by Bewer, because he exhibited an unusual aptitude for reading and understanding rabbinic literature. However, Ehrlich took against Bewer's Wellhausen-influenced acceptance of higher biblical criticism, which he dubbed "higher anti-Semitism."

However, the New Testament translation that he contributed to as a young man cost him his reputation. He was sorely resentful of the fact that, despite general recognition of his status as a scholar, he was never chosen as Professor of Bible at the Hebrew Union College, or invited to teach in any of the major rabbinical seminaries. Nobody would want to appoint a man who had engaged in New Testament translation, as it would invite criticism from all conservative quarters. Some time before 1917 he was furious to discover that he had not been included in the committee appointed by the Jewish Publication Society and the Central Conference of American Rabbis to prepare a new translation of the Hebrew Bible, despite having been used (and named in the completed work) as a consultant.

=== Personal and family life ===
Ehrlich was married twice. His son Mark, from his first wife, followed Ehrlich to Manhattan in 1885 without his mother. In America he married his second wife, Pauline (October 13, 1858-?), of Austrian descent. They had a daughter named Olga born 1881 in Manhattan, New York. His grandson Arnold M. Auerbach went on to become a distinguished playwright, essayist, humorist, critic, and an American Emmy-Award winning screenwriter.

Despite his passion for social justice and respect for all people, Ehrlich was uncomfortable in his relationships with others. An avid reader of philosopher, he maintained a steady correspondence with Hermann Cohen until his death one year before Ehrlich. As a matter of self-discipline, he required himself to read through Immanuel Kant's Critique of Pure Reason every year.

Ehrlich was an occasional synagogue attendant. He disliked Reform Judaism's siddur, the Union Prayer Book, primarily because he felt that its reform of the liturgy had not gone far enough. He felt that all the passages which belittled human dignity should be revised or eliminated. He believed that a modern Jewish prayer book should, of course, be rooted in traditional forms, but that prayers which involved a servile humility were inappropriate in the modern age and should be rewritten.

=== Death and legacy ===
Ehrlich died in November 1919.

Israel Friedlander wrote, after his passing (The Nation, January 10, 1920):

The death of Arnold B. Ehrlich, which occurred in the city of New York a short time ago, has deprived the world of Biblical scholarship of one of its most brilliant exponents. Ehrlich was not officially connected with any institution of learning; his name is little known outside of the narrow circle of professional Bible students, and is possibly not sufficiently known even among them. Yet, his life work, represented by eleven substantial volumes dedicated to the elucidation of the Scriptures, merits the grateful appreciation of all those to whom the Bible is an integral part of human civilization.

Ehrlich's exegetical work is an important contribution to modern biblical exegesis. Ehrlich's work was highly influential on the Jewish translation produced by the Jewish Publication Society in 1917 and its successor of 1962–82.

== Works ==
Ehrlich's best known works are:

- (in Hebrew) Mik'ra Kiph'shuto (מקרא כפשוטו) ("The Plain Meaning of the Bible"). Leipzig: 3 vols, 1899–1901; reprinted New York: Ktav, 1969.
- (in German) Randglossen zur Hebräischen Bibel; textkritisches, sprachliches und sachliches ("Notes on the Hebrew Bible"). Leipzig: J.C. Hinrichs. 7 vols, 1908–14; reprinted Hildesheim: Georg Olms, 1968. OCLC 1124545. His most substantial work, which took six years to complete and which was funded by Jacob H. Schiff and Dr. Isaac Adler.

He also prepared textbooks to introduce students to rabbinic literature, and prepared an anthology of aggadic passages entitled "Rashe Perakim" representative of material taught at the Emanu-El Theological School.

His poetic German translation of the Psalms had wide acclaim in its day. Although this volume is now out of print, it is available digitally. His scholarly work is written in German because, prior to World War I, German was regarded as the language of Jewish scholarship.

His unpublished notebooks can be found at the New York library of the Hebrew Union College-Jewish Institute of Religion. These notebooks are the addenda to the Randglossen.
