= Moritz Steinschneider =

Bohemian bibliographer and orientalist (1816–1907)

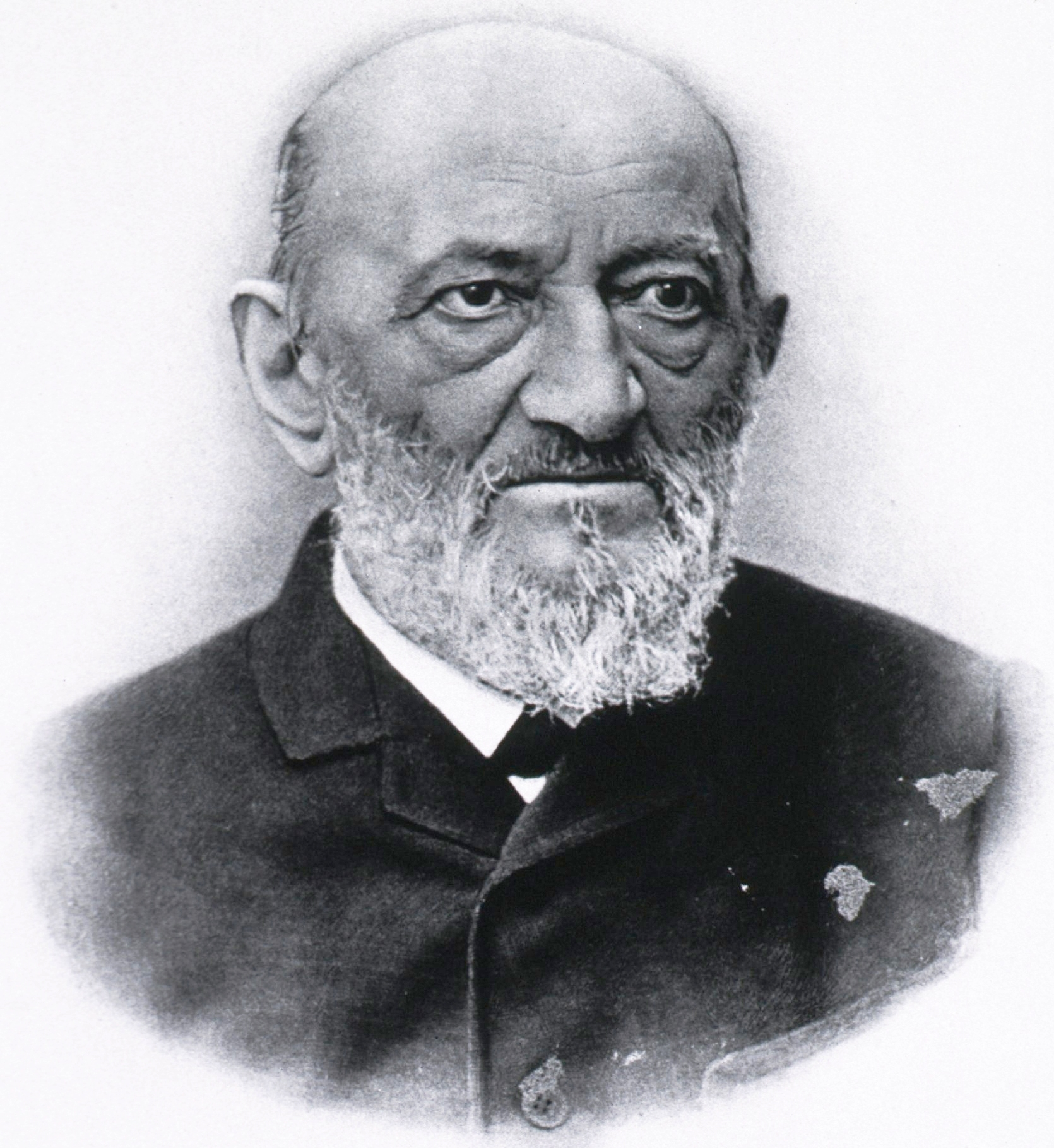
- Born: 30 March 1816; Prostějov, Moravia, Austrian Empire
- Died: 24 January 1907 (aged 90); Berlin, German Empire

Moritz Steinschneider (Yiddish: משה שטיינשניידער; 30 March 1816 – 24 January 1907) was a Moravian bibliographer and Orientalist, and an important figure in Jewish studies and Jewish history. He is credited as having invented the term antisemitism.

== Education ==
Moritz Steinschneider was born in Prostějov, Moravia, in 1816. He received his early instruction in Hebrew from his father, Jacob Steinschneider (b. 1782; d. March 1856), who was not only an expert Talmudist, but was also well versed in secular science. The house of the elder Steinschneider was the rendezvous of a few progressive Hebraists, among whom was his brother-in-law, the physician and writer Gideon Brecher.

At the age of six Steinschneider was sent to the public school, which was still an uncommon choice for Jews in the Austro-Hungarian Empire at the time; and at the age of thirteen he became the pupil of Rabbi Nahum Trebitsch, whom he followed to Mikulov, Moravia in 1832. The following year, in order to continue his Talmudic studies, he went to Prague, where he remained until 1836, attending simultaneously the lectures at the Normal School.

In 1836 Steinschneider went to Vienna to continue his studies, and, on the advice of his friend Leopold Dukes, he devoted himself especially to Oriental and Neo-Hebrew literatures, and most particularly to bibliography, which would become his principal focus. His countryman Abraham Benisch and Moravian Albert Löwy also were studying there at the time. In Lowy's room in 1838 they inaugurated among intimate (and lifelong) friends, a proto-Zionist society called "Die Einheit". The society's objective was to promote the welfare of the Jewish people, and in order to realize this objective, they advocated the settlement of Palestine by Austrian Jews. Their objective however, had to be kept secret for fear it would be put down by the government; England became regarded as the country likely to welcome the new movement. In 1841 Lowy was sent to London as an emissary of the Students' Jewish National Society; Benisch also arrived in England the same year. Somewhat abandoned, Steinschneider would later withdraw from the society completely in 1842, viewing the scheme as impractical compared to his studies.

As a Jew on the continent, Steinschneider was prevented from entering the Oriental Academy; and for the same reason he was unable even to obtain permission to make extracts from the Hebrew books and manuscripts in the Imperial Library, Vienna. In spite of these drawbacks he continued his studies in Arabic, Syriac, and Hebrew with Professor Kaerle at the Catholic Theological Faculty of the University. He had at this juncture the intention of adopting the rabbinical career. In Vienna, as formerly in Prague, he earned a livelihood by giving lessons, teaching Italian among other subjects.

=== University career ===
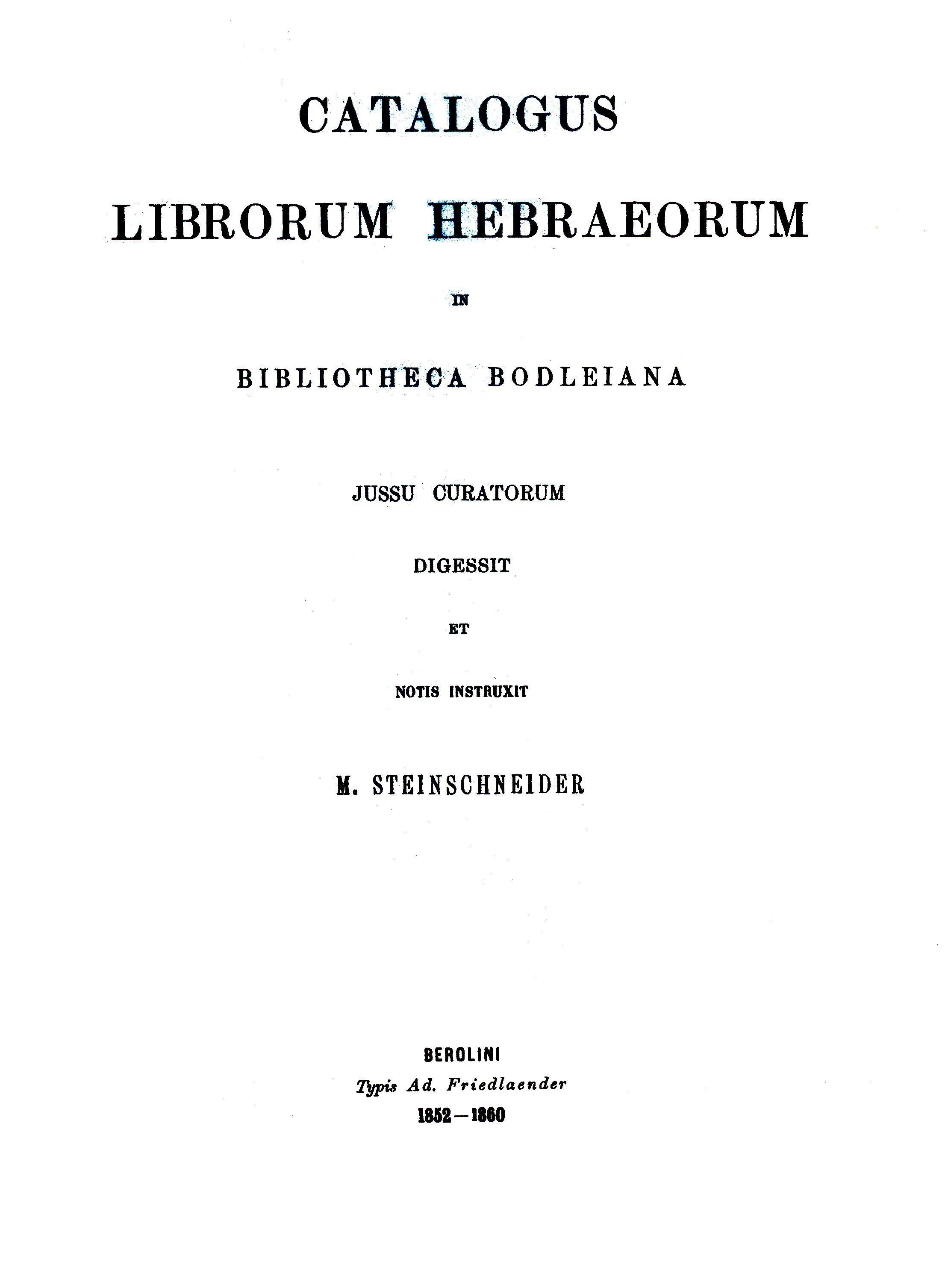
Title page of Moritz Steinschneider's catalogue of Hebrew books in the Bodleian Library, printed in Berlin (1852–1860)

For political reasons he was compelled to leave Vienna and decided to go to Berlin; but, being unable to obtain the necessary passport, he remained in Leipzig. At the university there he continued the study of Arabic under Professor Fleischer. At this time he began the translation of the Qur'an into Hebrew and collaborated with Franz Delitzsch in editing Aaron ben Elijah's 'Etz Chayyim (Leipzig, 1841); but the rules of the Austrian censorship did not permit the publication of his name as coeditor. While in Leipzig he contributed a number of articles on Jewish and Arabic literature to Pierer's Universal Encyklopädie.

Having at length secured the necessary passport, Steinschneider in 1839 proceeded to Berlin, where he attended the university lectures of Franz Bopp on comparative philology and the history of Oriental literatures. At the same time he made the acquaintance of Leopold Zunz and Abraham Geiger. In 1842 he returned to Prague, and in 1845 he followed Michael Sachs to Berlin; but the Orthodox tendencies of the latter caused Steinschneider to abandon definitely his intention of becoming a rabbi. At this time he was employed as a reporter of the National-Zeitung at the sessions of the National Assembly in Frankfurt am Main and as correspondent of the Prager Zeitung. In 1844, together with David Cassel, he drafted the Plan der Real-Encyclopädie des Judenthums, a prospectus of which work was published in the Literaturblatt des Orients; but the project was not carried through by Steinscheider.

On 17 March 1848 Steinschneider, after many difficulties, succeeded in becoming a Prussian citizen. The same year he was charged with the preparation of the catalogue of the Hebrew books in the Bodleian Library, Oxford (Catalogus Librorum Hebræorum in Bibliotheca Bodleiana, Berlin, 1852–60), a work which was to occupy him thirteen years, in the course of which he spent four summers in Oxford.

In 1850 he received from the University of Leipzig the degree of Ph.D. In 1859 he was appointed lecturer at the Veitel-Heine Ephraim'sche Lehranstalt in Berlin, where his lectures were attended by both Jewish and Christian students. From 1860 to 1869 he served as representative of the Jewish community at the administration, before the tribunals of the city, of the oath More Judaico, never omitting the opportunity to protest against this remnant of medieval prejudice. From 1869 to 1890 he was director of the Jüdische Mädchen-Schule (school for girls of the Jewish community), and in 1869 he was appointed assistant ("Hilfsarbeiter") in the Royal Library, Berlin. From 1859 to 1882 he edited the periodical Hebräische Bibliographie. In 1872 and 1876 he refused calls to the Hochschule für die Wissenschaft des Judentums in Berlin and the Budapest University of Jewish Studies, respectively, holding that the proper institutions for the cultivation of Jewish science were not the Jewish theological seminaries, but the universities.

== His field of activity ==
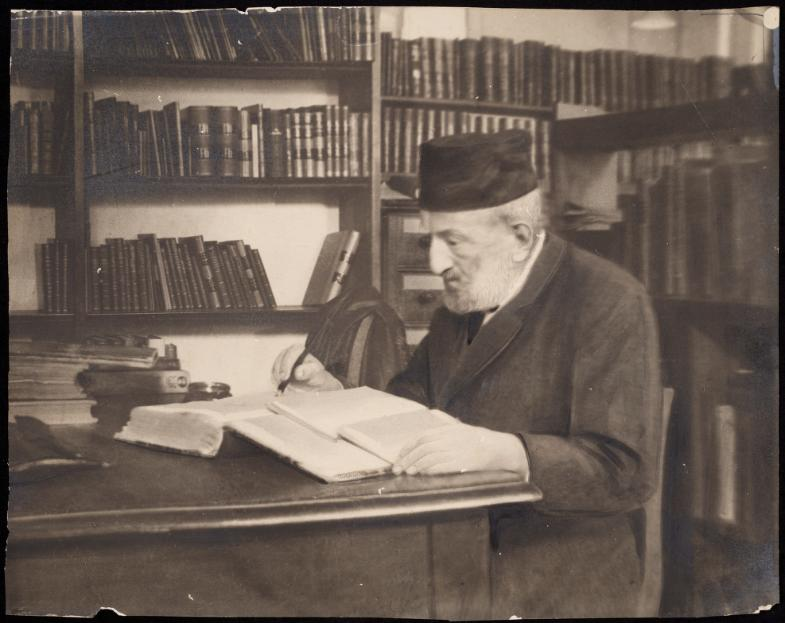
Moritz Steinschneider (1816–1907)

He chose fields far removed from that of theology proper, e.g., mathematics, philology, natural history, and medicine, to display the part which the Jews had taken in the general history of civilization (Kulturgeschichte). While Zunz had laid the foundations of Jewish science, Steinschneider completed many essential parts of the structure. He was the first to give a systematic survey of Jewish literature down to the end of the eighteenth century, and to publish catalogues of the Hebrew books and manuscripts which are found in the public libraries of Europe. The Bodleian catalogue laid the foundation of his reputation as the greatest Jewish bibliographer. This and the catalogues of the libraries of Leiden, Munich, Hamburg, and Berlin, as well as the twenty-one volumes of his Hebräische Bibliographie, form a mine of information of Jewish history and literature.

One of his most important original works is Die Hebräischen Übersetzungen des Mittelalters und die Juden als Dolmetscher: Ein Beitrag zur Literaturgeschichte des Mittelalters; meistenteils nach Handschriftlichen Quellen, (The Hebrew Translations of the Middle Ages and the Jews as Interpreters: a contribution to the literary history of the Middle Ages, mostly according to handwritten sources) published in Berlin, 1893, planned in 1849. While writing on Jewish literature for Ersch and Gruber's Allgemeine Encyclopädie der Wissenschaften und Künste (1844–47), he became conscious of the lack of sources on the influence of foreign works on Jewish literature. He determined to supplement the monographs of Huet, Jourdain, Wüstenfeld, and Johann Georg Wenrich on the history of translations by one having the Neo-Hebrew literature as its subject. In 1880 the Institut de France offered a prize for a complete bibliography of the Hebrew translations of the Middle Ages; Steinschneider for some time had tried to raise money for his work on translations, and his associates in Paris, especially Ernst Renan and Hartwig Derenbourg, were able to convince the Institut to devote the annual prize to that topic. Shortly thereafter, the Institut de France offered the prix Brunet for a work on the translations into Arabic from the Greek, which Steinschneider also won, but he used the prize money from both awards to prepare the German enlarged version of the first French Mémoire, which he self-published in 1893; he then published several articles based on the second Mémoire.

Steinschneider wrote with ease in German, Latin, French, Italian, and Hebrew; his style was not popular, intended only "for readers who know something, and who wish to increase their knowledge"; but he did not hesitate to write, together with Horwitz, a little reader for school-children, Imre Binah (1846), and other elementary school-books for the Sassoon School of the Bene Israel at Bombay. In 1839 he wrote Eine Uebersicht der Wissenschaften und Künste welche in Stunden der Liebe nicht uebersehen sind for Saphir's Pester Tageblatt, and in 1846 Manna, a volume of poems, adaptations of Hebrew poetry, which he dedicated to his fiancée, Augusta Auerbach, whom he married in 1848.

A revision, English translation, and updating of the Hebrew Translations of the Middle Ages is currently under publication. Two volumes have already been published.*

== Works ==
The following is a list of the more important independent works of Steinschneider, arranged in chronological order:

- 'Etz Chayyim, Ahron ben Elias aus Nikomedien des Karäer's System der Religionsphilosophie, etc., edited together with Franz Delitzsch. Leipzig, 1841.
- Die Fremdsprachlichen Elemente im Neuhebräischen. Prague, 1845.
- Imre Binah: Spruchbuch für Jüdische Schulen, edited together with A. Horwitz. Berlin, 1847.
- Manna (adaptations of Hebrew poetry from the eleventh to the thirteenth century). Berlin, 1847.
- Jüdische Literatur, in Ersch and Gruber, "Encyc." section ii, part 27, pp. 357–376, Leipzig, 1850 (English version, by William Spottiswoode, Jewish Literature from the Eighth to the Eighteenth Century, London, 1857; Hebrew version, by Henry Malter, Sifrut Yisrael, Wilna, 1899).
- Catalogus Librorum Hebræorum in Bibliotheca Bodleiana. Berlin, 1852–60.
- Die Schriften des Dr. Zunz. Berlin, 1857.
- Alphabetum Siracidis ... in Integrum Restitutum et Emendatum, etc. Berlin, 1858.
- Catalogus Codicum Hebræorum Bibliothecæ Academiæ Lugduno-Batavæ (with 10 lithograph tables containing specimens from Karaite authors). Leiden, 1858.
- Bibliographisches Handbuch über die Theoretische und Praktische Literatur für Hebräische Sprachkunde. Leipsic, 1859 (with corrections and additions, ib. 1896).
- Reshit ha-Limmud, a systematic Hebrew primer for D. Sassoon's Benevolent Institution at Bombay. Berlin, 1860.
- Zur Pseudoepigraphischen Literatur, Insbesondere der Geheimen Wissenschaften des Mittelalters. Aus Hebräischen und Arabischen Quellen. Berlin, 1862.
- Alfarabi des Arabischen Philosophen Leben und Schriften, etc. St. Petersburg, 1869.
- Die Hebräischen Handschriften der Königlichen Hof- und Staatsbibliothek in München (in the "Sitzungsberichte der-Philosophisch-Historischen Klasse der Königlichen Akademie der Wissenschaften in München"). Munich, 1875.
- Polemische und Apologetische Literatur in Arabischer Sprache Zwischen Muslimen, Christen und Juden. Leipzig, 1877.
- Catalog der Hebräischen Handschriften in der Stadtbibliothek zu Hamburg. Hamburg, 1878.
- Die Arabischen Übersetzungen aus dem Griechischen. Berlin, 1889–96.
- Die Hebräischen Übersetzungen des Mittelalters und die-Juden als Dolmetscher, etc. Berlin, 1893.
- Moritz Steinschneider. The Hebrew Translations of the Middle Ages and the Jews as Transmitters. Vol. I. Preface. General Remarks. Jewish Philosophers. Springer Dordrecht, 2013. Vol. II. Encyclopedias. Logic, Christian Philosophers.Springer, Dordrecht, 2022. (Vol. I edited by Charles Manekin, Y. Tzvi Langermann, and Hans Hinrich Biesterfeldt; vol. II edited by Charles H. Manekin and Hans Hinrich Biesterfeldt.)
- Verzeichniss der Hebräischen Handschriften der Königlichen Bibliothek zu Berlin. Part i, Berlin, 1897; part ii, ib. 1901.
- Die Arabische Literatur der Juden. Frankfurt am Main, 1902.

Besides a great number of contributions, in widely differing forms, to the works of others (see Steinschneider Festschrift, pp. xi–xiv), the following independent essays of Steinschneider deserve special mention:

- "Ueber die Volksliteratur der Juden", in R. Gosche's Archiv für Literaturgeschichte, 1871:
- "Constantinus Africanus und seine arabischen Quellen", in Virchows Archiv für pathol. Anatomie, vol. xxxvii;
- "Donnolo: Pharmakologische Fragmente aus dem 10. Jahrhundert", ib.;
- "Die Toxologischen Schriften der Araber bis zum Ende des XII. Jahrhunderts", ib. lii (also printed separately);
- "Gifte und Ihre Heilung: Eine Abhandlung des Moses Maimonides", ib. lvii;
- "Gab Es eine Hebräische Kurzschrift?" in Archiv für Stenographie, 1877 (reprint of the article "Abbre viaturen", prepared by Steinschneider for the proposed "Real-Encyclopädie des Judenthums", see above);
- "Jüdische Typographie und Jüdischer Buchhandel" with D. Cassel, in Ersch and Gruber, Encyc. section ii, part 28, pp. 21–94;
- "Die Metaphysik des Aristoteles in Jüdischer Bearbeitung", in the Zunz Jubelschrift, 1886;
- "Jehuda Mosconi", in Berliner's Magazin, 1876;
- "Islam und Judenthum", ib. 1880;
- "Ueber Bildung und den Einfluss des Reisens auf Bildung" (two lectures delivered in the Verein Junger Kaufleute; reproduced in the Virchow-Wattenbach "Sammlung Gemeinverständlicher Wissenschaftlicher Vorträge", 1894);
- "Lapidarien: Ein Culturgeschichtlicher Versuch", in the Kohut Memorial Volume, 1896;
- "Jüdisch-Deutsche Literatur", in Neuman's Serapeum, 1848–49;
- "Jüdisch-Deutsche Literatur und Jüdisch-Deutsch", ib. 1864, 1866, 1869;
- articles on Arabia, Arabic, Arabic literature, the caliphs, the Qur'an, the Muslim religion, and Muslim sects in the second edition (1839–43) of Pierer's Universallexikon;
- "Letteratura Italiana dei Giudei", in Il Vessillo Israelitico, 1877–80;
- "Letteratura Anti-giudaica in Lingua Italiana", ib. 1881–83;
- "Zur Geschichte der Übersetzungen aus dem Indischen in's Arabische", in Z. D. M. G. 1870–71;
- "Hebräische Drucke in Deutschland", in Ludwig Geiger's Zeitschrift für die Geschichte der Juden in Deutschland, 1886–92;
- "Abraham Judaeus-Savasorda und Ibn Esra", in Schlömilch's Zeitschrift für Mathematik und Physik, 1867;
- "Abraham ibn Ezra", ib. 1880.

Characteristic is Steinschneider's philosophic testament in the preface to his Arabische Literatur der Juden, in which he who laid the main foundation of the study of Jewish literature and history did not hesitate, at the age of eighty-six, to formulate an agnostic profession de foi.
