= Regine Ulmann =

Austrian school director and feminist

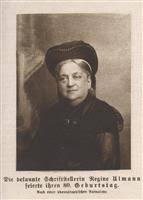
Regine Ulmann

Regine Ulmann née Kohn (1847–1938), also known by her pen names Gertrud Bürger and Agnes Thai, was an Austrian school director, editor and feminist. An active member of the Jewish women's movement, in 1866 she was one of six women who founded the Mädchen Unterstutzungs-Verein (Support Association for Girls), later becoming the director of the association's training schools for poor Jewish girls.

== Family and education ==
Born on 1 September 1847 in Vienna, Regine Kohn was the daughter of the merchant Wolf (Wilhelm) Kohn (c.1810–1884) and his wife Netty née Bisenz (c.1813–1855). In 1867, she married the merchant Sigmund Ulmann (1835–1914). Following the early death of her mother, Kohn was educated privately under the direction of her stepmother.

== Career ==
In 1867, when she was only 19, Regine Ulmann was a co-founder of the Mädchen Unterstutzungs-Verein which was designed to provide educational support and job training to girls from poor Jewish homes. In 1889, she established a training course for women in child care and in 1905, she initiated courses leading to women's employment as legal officials.

As her family suffered from the stock market crash of 1874, she completed a teacher training course and first headed the training school before undertaking further development of the girls' support association. Over the next few years, the number of girls attending the training school grew considerably. Following the death of Paula Frankl-Hochwart in 1895, Ulmann became director of the association which, from 1902, was known as the Bund Österreichischer Frauenvereine (Federation of Austrian Women's Organizations).

In 1896, in collaboration with Marianne Hainisch, she headed the non-confessional the Frauenvereinigung für soziale Hilfstätigkeit (Women's Social Assistance Association), becoming one of the most important figures in the Austrian women's movement. She also became active in many other women's organizations including the Verband Weiblische Fürsorge (Women's Welfare Association) which she later chaired until 1938. In particular, the association brought together 40 non-political welfare organizations in order to ensure better coordination during the First World War.

In 1923, together with Anitta Müller-Cohen and Marianne Hainisch, she organized the First World Congress of Jewish Women which opened in the Hofburg. During the congress, she presented the history of Jewish women's organizations in Austria.

Ulmann was also active as a journalist and editor, contributing articles to all the main organs of the women's movement. For some 27 years, she was editor-in-chief of Das Blatt der Hausfrau (The Housewife's Paper). She also contributed articles to the Austrian, German and Swiss press, especially to the Neue Freie Presse, the Osterreichische Volkszeitung, the Wiener Mode, the Vossische Zeitung and the Neues Wiener Tagblatt.

Regine Ulmann died in Vienna on 13 March 1939.

== Awards and honours ==
In 1937, Ulmann was honoured with the Austrian Civil Medal of Merit in Gold (Goldenes Verdienstzeichen des österreichischen Verdienstordens).
