= Saadia ben Nachmani =

Saadia ben Naḥmani was a German rabbi active in the 11th and 12th centuries.

== Early life and education ==
The Jewish Encyclopedia believed that ben Nachmani was a native of Germany because of the many German words found in his biblical commentaries. His maternal uncle was Kalonymus ben Judah.

He learned under Eleazar ben Meshullam as well as in Narbonne under Isaac ben Samuel.

== Career ==
Ben Nachmani was an author of liturgical poems for the evening prayers on Sukkot. The poems begin with the words "Sukkat shalem selah" and consist of ten strophes of six lines each. According to Leopold Zunz, ben Nachmani also wrote the poem Elohekhem dirshu which is recited on the Shabbat of Rosh Chodesh.

According to Ḥayyim Michael, it was ben Nachmani who was quoted by Rashi as having personally spoken to Rav Saadia in his commentaries. Michael also believed that ben Nachmani himself was a biblical commentator. A commentary on the Book of Chronicles, originally believed to be authored by Rashi, was discovered not to be written by him but instead by the students of Rav Saadia. It has been proven that ben Nachmani's commentary on Chronicles was copied by his pupils in different areas, which caused many variants of the original work. Additionally, Hayyim Michael also believed that ben Nachmani may be the author of a commentary on the Sefer Yetzirah. The commentary is normally attributed to the Saadia Gaon, who wrote a different commentary on the same book, but Joseph Delmedigo et Jacob Emden proved that this particular commentary was attributed to the Saadia Gaon in error. As with ben Nachmani's commentary on Chronicles, the Sefer Yetzirah commentary was arranged by ben Nachmani's students, who are believed to have altered his words in certain parts.

According to Henry Malter, ben Nachmani is the hero of a legend that is attributed to the Saadia Gaon, but which probably takes place in Christian Europe.
