= First World Congress of Jewish Women =

1923 convention in Austria

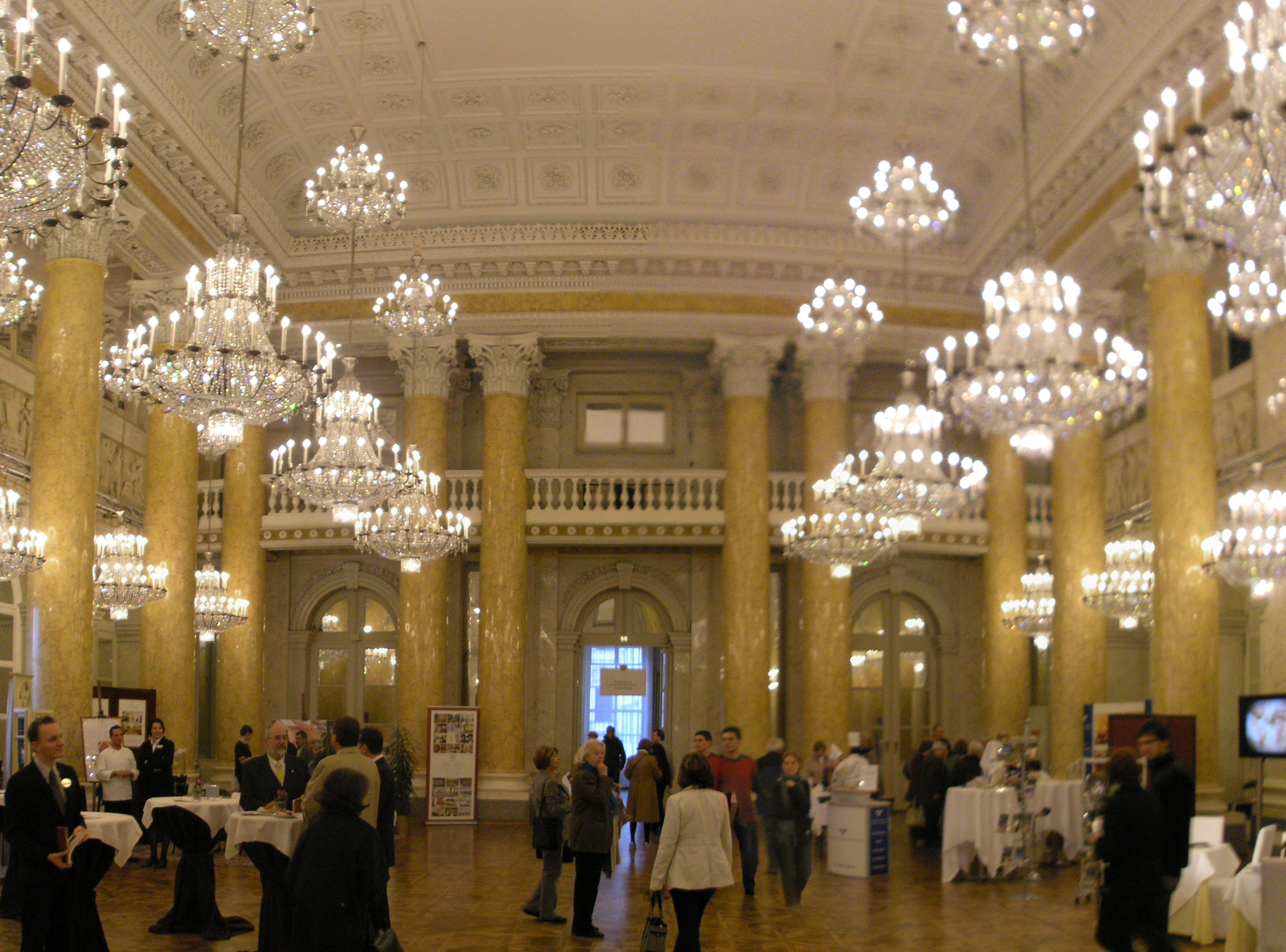
The opening session of the congress was held in the Rittersaal of Vienna's Hofburg.

The First World Congress of Jewish Women was held in Vienna, Austria, from 6 to 11 May 1923. It brought together some 200 delegates from over 20 countries. Zionism was a prominent topic, while emigration to Palestine for Jewish refugees was discussed and strongly supported.

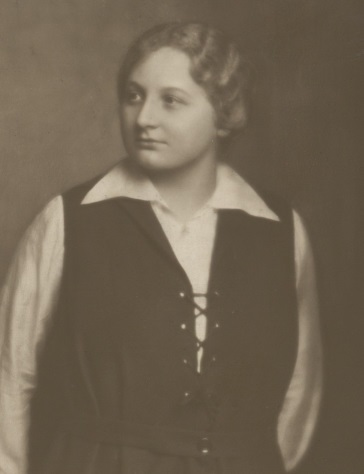
Anitta Müller-Cohen, congress organizer

== Background ==
Interest in international activities grew out of the National Council of Jewish Women (NCJW) which was established in the United States at the end of the 19th century. It was followed by Jewish women's organizations in England and Germany and the foundation of the International Council of Jewish Women. There was renewed interest after the end of World War I when delegates of the NCJW were sent to Europe to investigate the situation there. It was therefore decided to bring together Jewish women from many different countries to a conference in May 1923 where they could "consider problems created by the war and lay constructive plans for working together".

== Conference ==
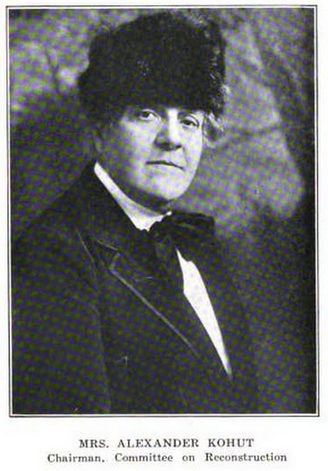
Rebekah Kohut, congress chair

Supported by the Council of Jewish Women, local preparations for the congress were ensured above all by Anitta Müller-Cohen.

Chaired by the Hungarian-born American Rebekah Kohut, the Vienna congress brought together delegates from over 20 countries. Held in the impressive premises of the Hofburg, the opening session was also attended by many illustrious local figures, including the Austrian president Michael Hainisch, the mayor of Vienna, the chief of police, as well as writers and politicians. Subsequent sessions were held in the Commerce Association's building (im Großen Saal des Kaufmännischen Gremiums).

=== Speakers ===
Among the speakers at the congress's opening session were Marianne Hainisch, founder of the Austrian women's movement; Zwi Perez Chajes, chief rabbi of Vienna; Regine Ulmann and Anitta Müller-Cohen from the women's movement; and Alois Pick, president of the Jewish Community of Vienna (German: Israelitische Kultusgemeinde Wien).

Speakers spoke in their first languages, mainly Austrian German and English, but occasionally also French and Italian. Where necessary, interpretation was provided. Speaking on behalf of Vienna's Sephardic community, Mazal Ovadia spoke in Modern Hebrew, receiving wide acclaim. There were some 200 congress delegates from the First Austrian Republic, Belgium, Czechoslovakia, Denmark, the Free City of Danzig, the French Third Republic, the Weimar Republic, the Kingdom of Hungary, Fascist Italy, the Republic of Latvia, Lithuania, the Dutch colonial empire, Mandatory Palestine, Second Polish Republic, Kingdom of Romania, Federal Switzerland, the British Empire, and the United States. There were also women from the Soviet Union and the Ukrainian Soviet Socialist Republic.

=== Topics ===
The five main topics discussed over the conference's six day programme included "the duties of the Jewish woman within the community, the problem of refugees and orphans, the situation of homeless girls, aid for emigration, and support for Palestine." There was lengthy discussion of how Palestine could serve as a sanctuary for European refugees who wished to relocate. Among the speakers on the first days were Roza Pomerantz-Meltzer from Poland on grants for Jewish schools, Bertha Pappenheim from Austria on the need to protect Jewish girls from prostitution, and Dr. Korolik from Russia on the dreadful treatment of Jewish children in Russia.

The discussions revealed the disastrous consequences for refugees and orphans who had been rendered homeless as a result of pogroms and persecution. When representatives from Eastern Europe described the fate of Jews in Russia and Ukraine, the effects on the participants were so distressing that the proceedings had to be interrupted for a few minutes. While there was no support for political action, it was suggested that, in line with the Balfour Declaration, Zionism could serve as a practical means of dealing with the suffering experienced by the Jews.

There was unanimous agreement on the need for support to Palestine. In the words of one of the final congress resolutions: "It appears, therefore, to be the duty of all Jews to co-operate in the social-economic reconstruction of Palestine and to assist in the settlement of Jews in that country."

== Second congress ==
A second World Congress of Jewish Women was held in Hamburg, Germany, from 3 to 6 June 1929.

== See also ==
- 1902 Kosher Meat Boycott
