= Rebekah Bettelheim Kohut =

American educator, writer, and community leader

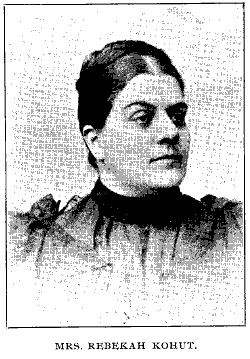
Rebekah B. Kohut, from an 1895 publication.

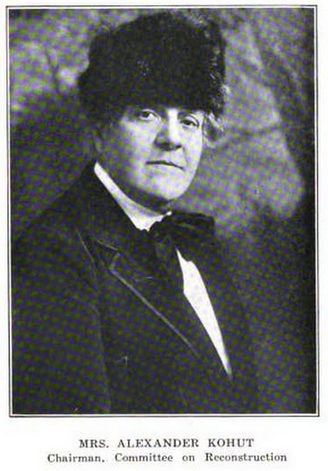
Rebekah B. Kohut, from a 1922 publication.

Rebekah Bettelheim Kohut (September 9, 1864 – August 11, 1951) was an American educator, writer, and community leader, born in Hungary. She was the first president of the World Congress of Jewish Women, elected at its first convention in 1923. In 1935, Lillian Wald called Rebekah Kohut "American Jewry's First Lady."

== Early life and education ==
Rebekah Bettelheim was born in Kassa, Hungary (now Košice, in Slovakia), the daughter of Rabbi Albert Bettelheim and teacher Henrietta A. Weintraub Bettelheim. The Bettelheim family immigrated to the United States when Rebekah was a small child. They lived in Richmond, Virginia before settling in San Francisco, California, where Kohut finished high school. She attended but did not graduate from the University of California.

== Career ==
As a rabbi's wife in New York City, she took a public role in community improvement. She founded a women's organization in her husband's congregation at Central Synagogue; the Central Synagogue Sisterhood of Personal Service helped new immigrants on the Lower East Side. She was also involved in the New York Women's Health Protective Association, which sought improved sanitation in the city.

As an educator, she was the only Jewish woman to address the National Congress of Mothers in 1897, on the topic of "Parental Reverence, as Taught in Hebrew Homes." In 1899, she started the Kohut College Preparatory School for Girls, a boarding school, which she ran until 1905 with her stepson George Alexander Kohut. They started and edited a Jewish school newspaper, Helpful Thoughts. She gave lectures on English literature for many years. In 1933 she began a two-year stint as head of the Columbia Grammar School.

In widowhood, she was president of the New York section of the National Council of Jewish Women (NCJW), served as a trustee of the Young Women's Hebrew Association, and was active in New York City politics. During World War I she worked with the city's Women's Committee for National Defense on placing women in war-related work, and she was a fundraiser for war relief. She became chair of the NCJW's Reconstruction Committee, tasked with aiding Jewish communities in war-ravaged Europe. In 1923, she was a founder and the first president of the World Congress of Jewish Women, organized at Vienna. In 1927, she was the first woman to serve as a judge on the Jewish Court of Arbitration in New York City. In 1932, New York Governor Franklin D. Roosevelt appointed her the sole female member of the Joint Legislative Committee on Unemployment, where she called for the immediate establishment of state unemployment insurance.

She wrote two memoirs, My Portion (1925), and More Yesterdays (1950), and a biography of her stepson, His Father's House: The Story of George Alexander Kohut (1938). In the 1930s, she served as an advisor to the New York State Employment Service, and raised funding and awareness for addressing the plight of German Jewish refugees. "The Jewish woman," she proclaimed, "must choose between a disorganized, chaotic, and insecure world and a world in which there is peace, plenty, freedom, and security."

== Personal life ==
She married Rabbi Alexander Kohut in 1887, a widower with five sons and three daughters from his first marriage, most of them still young. Rabbi Benjamin Szold performed the ceremony. She was widowed when Rabbi Kohut died in 1894. "I was born in Europe, grew to girlhood in Virginia, was educated in California, and hope to end my days in New York," she wrote in 1895.

== Death and legacy ==
Kohut died in 1951, aged 86 years, in New York.

In 1952, Kohut's stepdaughter, Julia Kahn, donated two Assyrian tablets to Yale University in memory of Rebekah Kohut. The Kohut Family Papers, including ledgers from Rebekah Kohut's school for girls, are archived at Yale University.

== Selected works ==
- My Portion (1925)
- More Yesterdays (1950)
- His Father's House: The Story of George Alexander Kohut (1938)

== See also ==
- List of first women lawyers and judges in New York
