= Roza Pomerantz-Meltzer =

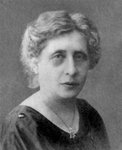
Roza Pomerantz-Meltzer

Roza Pomerantz-Meltzer (Polish: Róża Pomeranc-Melcer; November 5, 1880 – October 19, 1934) was a Polish writer and novelist based in the city of Lviv. In 1922 she became the first Jewish woman to be elected to the Sejm, the Parliament of Poland, as a member of the Committee of United National Jewish Parties. A strong promoter of Zionism, she was an influential member of local Jewish women's organizations, especially the Koło Kobiet Żydowskich (Jewish Women's Circle). She contributed to a number of local and foreign journals, writing in both German and Polish, and participated in international congresses.

== Biography ==
Born in 1880 in Tarnopol, Roza Pomerantz was brought up in a well-to-do Jewish family. In addition to her schooling, she had private lessons in music and German. After studying for three years at the Leipzig Conservatoire, she returned to Tarnopol where she supported initiatives providing assistance to Jewish orphans, especially those returning from the 1903 Kishinev pogroms without their parents. In 1906, she married Izaak Melcer, a railways official.

Pomerantz contributed articles to a wide variety of newspapers and journals in both Polish and German. These included the Lviv Zionist papers Wshód and Przyszlośé as well as Die Welt and Das Israelische Familienblatt and the Swiss Jüdische Arbeiter and Dr. Blochs Wochenschrift. Among her contributions were the short stories Ein Chazarenkönig, Chancia and the play Matka which was first performed in Lviv in Polish. In the 1920s, she published the short story Der Chossen Bocher. As a result, she became well known to those who read Zionist publications in German. She also wrote novels featuring Galician Jews such as Im Land der Not. Other works included An die jüdischen Frauen: Ein Appell (1898) and "Die Bedeutung der zionistischen Idee im Leber der Jüdin" in Der Zionismus und die Frauen (c.1905).

She also exerted considerable influence on Zionist youth in Galicia, arranging and attending festivities and functions. She was an active member of the women's movement, helping to establish a Zionist women's association in Stryi as early as 1898. In 1908, it was registered as Ognisko Kobiet Żydowskich (Jewish Women's Cercle). In 1901 in Tarnopol, she was elected chair of the district committee while in 1903, she proposed the establishment of a Galician Zionish women's association which led to the founding of the Kolo Kobiet Żydowskich (KKZ) in 1908 in Lviv. After the end of the First World War, under the KKZ, she established a Jewish kindergarten (1918) and a girls' home (1919).

In 1911, Pomerantz represented Galicia at the 10th Zionist Congress in Basel, becoming one of the pioneers of the Women's International Zionist Organization which was established in London in 1920. In 1923, she participated in the First World Congress of Jewish Women in Vienna, demanding support for Jewish emigrants to Palestine.

Róża Pomerantz-Meltzer died on 20 October 1934, aged 55.
