= Gideon Brecher =

Austrian writer and physician

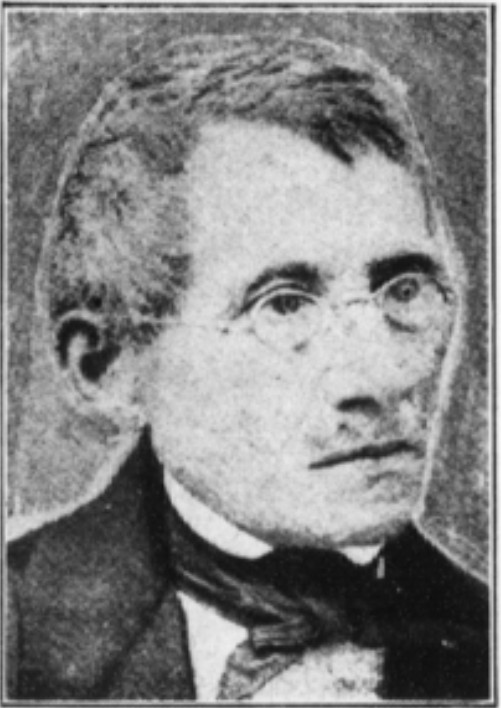
- Born: 12 January 1797; Prossnitz, Moravia, Habsburg Empire
- Died: 14 May 1873 (aged 76); Prossnitz, Moravia, Austria-Hungary
- Education: University of Erlangen
- Spouse: Josephine Zadek
- Relatives: Moritz Steinschneider (nephew)

Gideon Brecher (Hebrew: גדעון ברכר; 12 January 1797 – 14 May 1873), also known by the pen name Gedaliah ben Eliezer (Hebrew: גדליה בן אליעזר, was an Austrian writer and medical doctor. He was a central figure in the Moravian Haskalah.

== Biography ==
Brecher was born in Prossnitz, Moravia, and attended yeshivot in Eibenschütz and Nikolsburg. He was the first Jew of Prossnitz to study medicine or any other professional field. Brecher received a graduate degree in surgery and obstetrics at the University of Pest in 1824, and obtained a doctorate in medicine at the University of Erlangen in 1849, with the thesis Das Transcendentale, Magie und Magische Heilarten im Talmud (Vienna, 1850).

Brecher's fame in Jewish literature rests principally on this work and upon his lucid commentary on the Kuzari of Judah ha-Levi, which appeared with the text in four parts (Prague, 1838–1840). His correspondence with Samuel David Luzzato about this commentary was also published.

In addition to many contributions to scientific and literary periodicals and collections, as well as providing several important "Gutachten" (expert opinions) on social and religious questions submitted to him by imperial and local government officials, Brecher is the author of a monograph on circumcision, Die Beschneidung der Israeliten (Vienna, 1845), with an introduction by Hirsch Fassel, and an appendix on Circumcision Among the Semitic Nations, by Moritz Steinschneider. Brecher also wrote Die Unsterblichkeitslehre des Israelitischen Volkes (Vienna, 1857), of which a French translation appeared in the same year by Isidore Cahen; and Concordantiæ nominum propriorum, a concordance of Biblical proper names, part of which was revised and published after his death by his son Adolph Brecher.

== Partial bibliography ==
- Das Transcendetale, Magie, und Magische Heilertarten im Talmud [Transcendental magic, and the supernatural methods of curing disease, as given in the Talmud] (in German). Vienna: Klopf und Eurich. 1850. hdl:2027/hvd.ah599p.
- L'immortalité de l'âme chez les Juifs (in French). Translated by Cahen, Isidore. Paris: A. Franck. 1857.
- Die Beschneidung der Israeliten von der historischen, praktisch-operativen und ritualen Seite [Israelite circumcision, described from historical, practical-operative, and ritual aspects] (in German). Vienna: F. E. von Schmid and J. J. Busch. 1845.
- Die Unsterblichkeitslehre des Israelitischen Volkes (in German). Leipzig: Oskar Leiner. 1857. hdl:2027/hvd.hnx7vf.
- Concordantiæ nominum propriorum quæ in libris sacris continentur, a divo patre (in Latin). Frankfurt: J. Kauffmann. 1876. hdl:2027/hvd.ah5lvg.
