= Franz Delitzsch =

German Lutheran theologian and hebraist

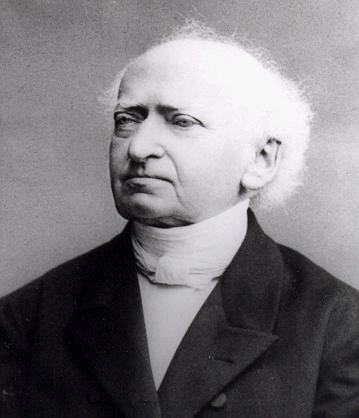
Franz Delitzsch.

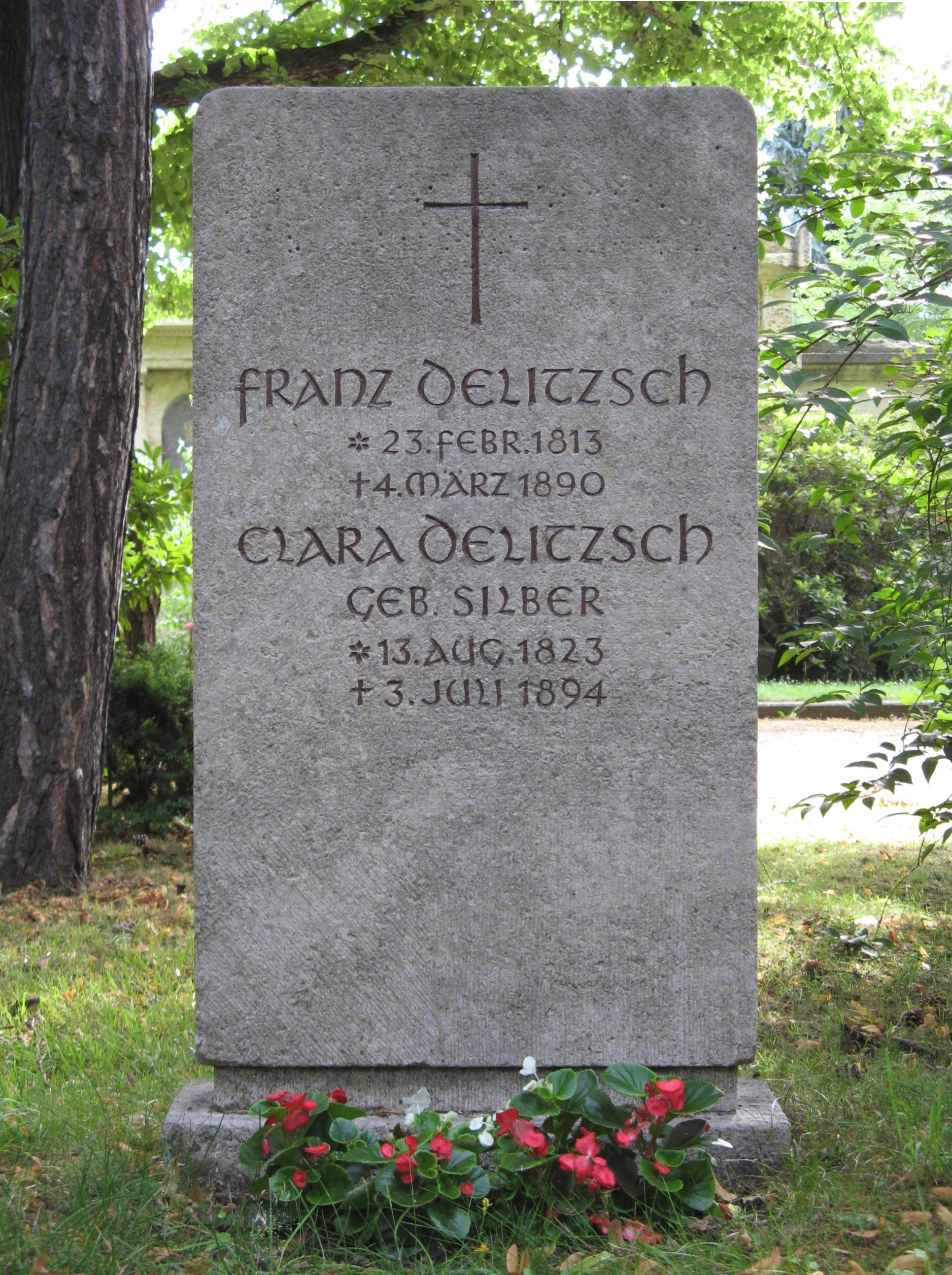
Franz Delitzch's gravestone in Leipzig.

Franz Delitzsch (23 February 1813, in Leipzig – 4 March 1890, in Leipzig) was a German Lutheran theologian and Hebraist. Delitzsch wrote many commentaries on books of the Bible, Jewish antiquities, Biblical psychology, as well as a history of Jewish poetry, and works of Christian apologetics. Today, Delitzsch is best known for his translation of the New Testament into Hebrew (1877), and his series of commentaries on the Old Testament published with Carl Friedrich Keil.

Delitzsch's son, Friedrich Delitzsch (1850–1922), was an influential Assyriologist and author of works on Assyrian language, literature, and history.

== Biography ==
Although Delitzsch was Christian, he was often supposed to be of Jewish ancestry, due to the unusual breadth of his rabbinical learning, as well as his strong sympathy with the Jewish people, whom he defended against attacks. His family circumstances were also unusual, in that he had a Jewish benefactor who lived in the family house, and a Jewish godfather.

Delitzsch was baptized on March 4, 1813, at the big St. Nicholas Church in central Leipzig, with the name "Franz Julius". His father Johann Gottfried Delitzsch was a peddler, craftsman and day laborer. His mother's name was Susanna Rosina. Franz was the youngest of three children, but the only one to survive early infancy. His godfather's name was given on the baptismal record as Franz Julius Hirsch, a dealer in second-hand furniture. The fact that the godfather's given name was the same as his own is a first indication of possible filiation.

Another unusual detail has to do with his schooling. Despite his parents' humble circumstances, Delitzsch was able to attend school and university thanks to the patronage of one Lewy Hirsch, a Jewish antiques dealer whom Delitzsch called his "benefactor". Hirsch lived in the same house as the Delitzsch family. It seems that Hirsch may have later been baptized thanks to Delitzsch's influence, taking the name "Theodor". There was speculation during Delitzsch's lifetime that Lewy Hirsch and the godfather Franz Julius Hirsch were actually the same person, and that this was in fact Delitzsch's biological father. Delitzsch himself always rejected this allegation. But the notion that Delitzsch's family harbored a secret Jewish identity under a Christian facade is not far-fetched. Conversion to Christianity was common among German Jews at the turn of the 19th century, and it was usually motivated by pragmatic considerations, since government posts and teaching positions were restricted to Christians.

Delitzsch specialized early on in Semitic studies. He became assistant professor at the University of Leipzig in 1844, and full professor at the University of Rostock in 1846, then the University of Erlangen in 1850, and in 1867 he came back to the University of Leipzig, where he spent the rest of his life.

Delitzsch had two sons, Johannes (1846-1876), who became a theologian, and Friedrich (1850-1922), the noted Assyriologist.

Delitzsch collaborated with Carl Friedrich Keil on a commentary series which covers the whole of the Old Testament. First published in 1861, it is still in print. Delitzsch contributed the commentaries on the Book of Job, Psalms, Book of Proverbs, Ecclesiastes, Song of Solomon, and the Book of Isaiah. Independent of this series, Delitzsch also wrote a commentary on the Book of Genesis, published in 1888.

Delitzsch's translation of the New Testament into Hebrew (1877) is still considered the standard New Testament edition in Hebrew and in its 10th Edition it was revised by a young Arnold Ehrlich at Delitzsch's insistence. This edition was intended to be used for proselytization among Jews. Later it was revised by Gustaf Dalman, with whom he shared "a common interest in the evangelization of the Jews". It is remarkable that these editions were composed before the modern revival of the Hebrew language, but the translations still remain fresh and alive for readers today.

In 1880 Delitzsch established the Institutum Judaicum in Leipzig for the training of Christian missionary workers among Jews.

Another Christian missionary to the Jews, John Duncan, wrote that Delitzsch "stood firm in maintenance of the divine authority and inspiration of the whole Old Testament" at a time when many "seemed willing to surrender".

== Works ==
=== Old Testament Commentary ===
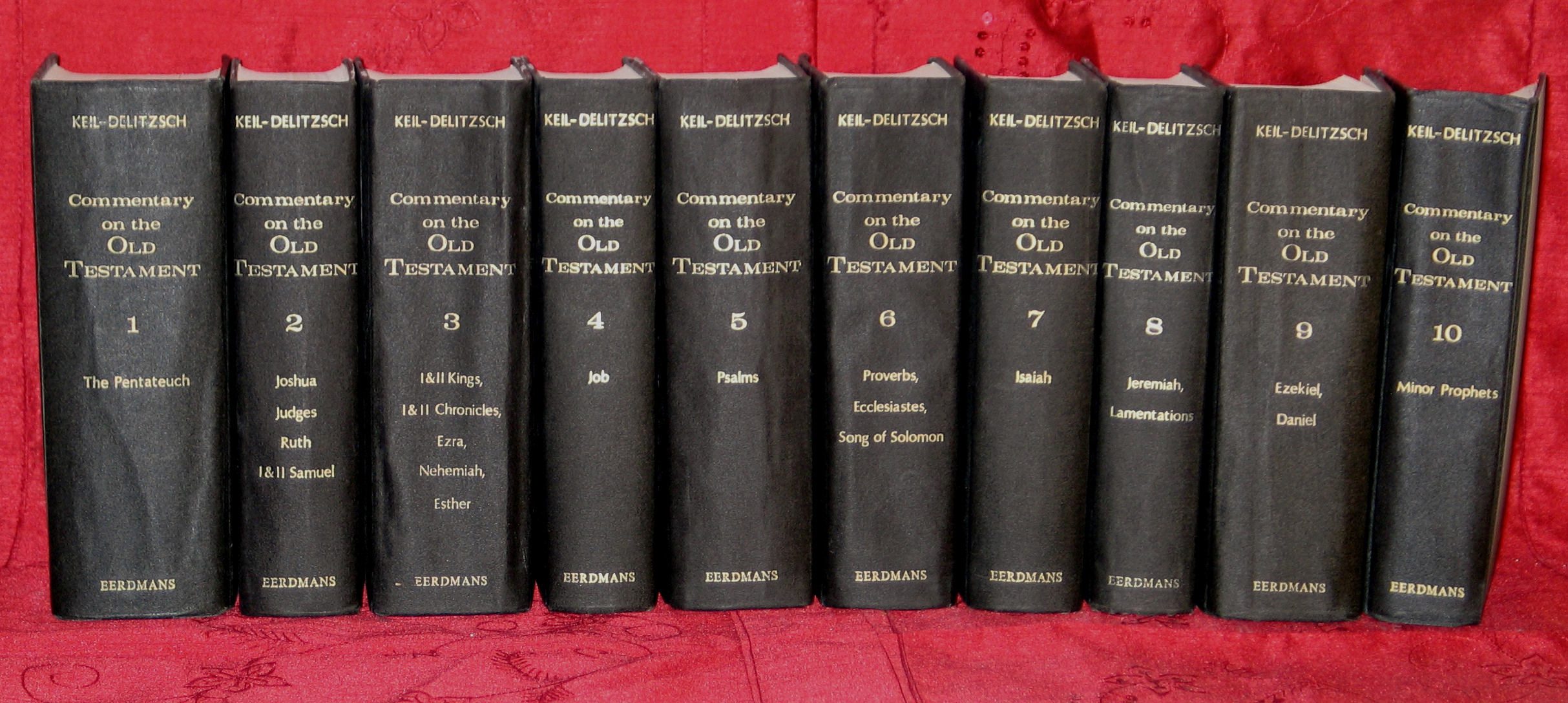
Keil–Delitzsch: Commentary on the Old Testament I–X. Grand Rapids 1975.

From the commentary compilations by Keil and Delitzsch:

- Volume 1: Pentateuch
- Volume 2: Joshua, Judges, Ruth, 1 & 2 Samuel
- Volume 3: 1 & 2 Kings, 1 & 2 Chronicles
- Volume 4: Ezra, Nehemiah, Esther, Job
- Volume 5: Psalms
- Volume 6: Proverbs, Ecclesiastes, Song of Songs
- Volume 7: Isaiah
- Volume 8: Jeremiah, Lamentations
- Volume 9: Ezekiel, Daniel
- Volume 10: Minor Prophets

=== Other ===
- "Die Genesis, by Franz Delitzsch". The Online Books Page. 1852.
- Handschriftliche Funde: Die Erasmischen Entstellungen des Textes der Apokalypse (Leipzig 1861)
- Jesus und Hillel, essay of 1865/66
- ברית חדשה (Berit Khadasha), Hebrew New Testament, Leipzig 1877
- Rohling's Talmudjude beleuchtet, Leipzig 1881 (Delitzsch's arguments on the misrepresentation of the Talmud by August Rohling)
- Neuer Kommentar über die Genesis, mit einem Geleitwort von Prof.Dr. Siegfried Wagner, Gießen/Basel (Brunnen), 1999 (Nachdruck der Ausgabe Leipzig [Dörffling und Franke] 1887). Sophia Taylor's 'A New Commentary of Genesis' (1888, 1889) is the English translation (in two volumes).
- Messianische Weissagungen in geschichtlicher Folge, mit einem Geleitwort von Dr. Gerhard Maier, Gießen/Basel (Brunnen), 1992. (Nachdruck der ersten Auflage Leipzig [Faber] 1890).
- Die Psalmen, Gießen/Basel (Brunnen), 2005 (Nachdruck der fünften, bearbeiteten Auflage Leipzig Dörffling und Franke 1894)
- System der biblischen Psychologie, (Leipzig: Dorffling & Franke, 1861); English Translation: A System of Biblical Psychology, (Edinburgh: T&T Clark, 1869); 2nd ed. (Grand Rapids: Baker Book House, 1966).
- Commentary on the Epistle to the Hebrews by Franz Delitzsch, translated from the German by Thomas L. Kingsbury (Grand Rapids, Michigan, Wm. B. Eerdmans Publishing Company, 1952) 2 volumes
