= Alexander Kohut =

Rabbi and orientalist (1842–1894)

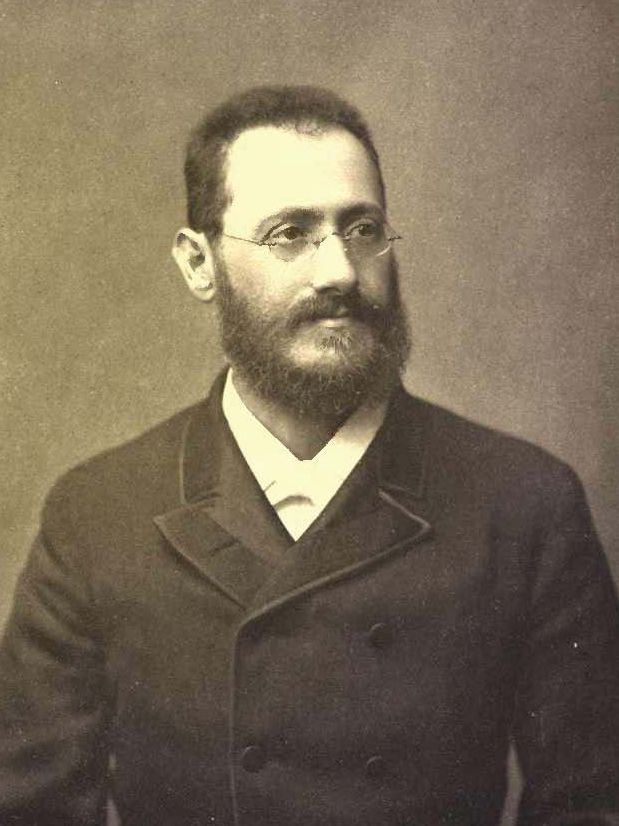
- Alexander Kohut

Personal life
- Born: April 22, 1842 Irsa, Hungary
- Died: May 25, 1894 (aged 52) New York City, United States
- Parent: Israel Kohut (father)

Religious life
- Religion: Judaism

Alexander (Chanoch Yehuda) Kohut (Hebrew: חנוך יהודה קוהוט; April 22, 1842 – May 25, 1894) was a rabbi and orientalist. He belonged to a family of rabbis, the most noted among them being Rabbi Israel Palota, his great-grandfather, Rabbi Amram (called "The Gaon," who died in Safed, Palestine, where he had spent the last years of his life), and his great-granduncle Rabbi Chayyim Kitssee, rabbi in Erza. The last-named was the author of several rabbinic works.

== Early training ==
Kohut's father, Israel Kohut, was a great linguist and well versed in rabbinic literature. He was so poor that he could not afford to send his son to the village school. There being no Hebrew school (cheder) in his native town, Alexander reached his eighth year without having learned even the rudiments of Hebrew or Hungarian. His family soon relocated to Kecskemét, where Kohut received his first instruction. He attended the gymnasium and at the same time studied Talmud with an old scholar, Reb Gershom Lövinger. In his fifteenth year, while trying to decipher some foreign words in the Talmud with the aid of Landau's Dictionary, he conceived the plan of writing a complete lexicon of the Talmud, not having found the etymology of many words in Landau.

After finishing the gymnasium course in Kecskemét, he removed to Budapest. Anxious to continue his rabbinical studies, he went to Breslau. In 1865, he received a call to the rabbinate of Tarnowitz, Upper Silesia. He then spent another year in Breslau, devoting his time to Oriental philology and Semitics. During the previous year he received his Ph.D. degree from the University of Leipzig, with a dissertation called "Ueber die Jüdische Angelologie und Daemonologie in ihrer Abhängigkeit vom Parsismus." The essay was published by the Deutsche Morgenländische Gesellschaft in 1866, it being the first Jewish work issued under the auspices of that society. He obtained his rabbinical diploma in 1867.

It was in 1864 that he began to collect materials for a critical edition of the 'Aruk of Nathan ben Jehiel.

In 1867 he was called to the rabbinate of Székesfehérvár, Hungary. Baron József Eötvös, the famous Hungarian poet and novelist, and afterward "Cultusminister," appointed him superintendent of all the schools in the county, this being the first time that such a position had been tendered to a Jew. The Congress of Jewish notables held in Budapest in 1868 appointed Kohut its secretary. Notable among his literary labors falling in this period is his study entitled "Etwas über die Moral und Abfassungszeit des Buches Tobias," originally published in Abraham Geiger's Jüdische Zeitschrift für Wissenschaft und Leben vol. x., several monographs in the Zeitschrift der Deutschen Morgenländischen Gesellschaft which developed his original thesis concerning Persian influence on Judaism, and his "Kritische Beleuchtung der Persischen Pentateuch-Uebersetzung des Jakob ben Joseph Tavus" (Leipzig, 1871).

Among his literary remains are to be found materials for a critical edition of the Persian text of this version. In 1872 he was elected chief rabbi of Pécs, Hungary, remaining there eight years. By this time his reputation as a Hungarian orator had spread so far that many noted statesmen and church dignitaries came to hear him from distant towns.

== Dictionary of the Talmud ==
Around 1873, Kohut began to compile his Dictionary of the Talmud, entirely in German, encouraged by the promise of a Christian nobleman to bear all costs of publication. He had proceeded as far as the third letter of the alphabet when he found that the work was assuming such gigantic proportions as to preclude the possibility of its being confined within the projected limits. Arduous as the merely mechanical labor of copying the manuscript was, he rewrote what he had written, intending to publish the original text of the old 'Aruk, with a German commentary.

On the advice of Leopold Zunz and Salomon Buber, however, who argued that the 'Aruk, being a national classic, ought to be compiled in Hebrew throughout, he again rewrote the work in that language, the labor of copying occupying two more years. It is this trait of untiring patience, which scorned all obstacles, that made the publication of vol. I, in 1878, possible. His Maecenas, in the meantime, had died, and Kohut was left to bear the burden of expense alone, save for the subvention of the Academy of Sciences in Vienna and of the Cultusministerium in Berlin. He called his work Aruch Completum or 'Aruk ha-Shalem, and its production occupied twenty-five years of his life.

The first four volumes were printed during his residence in Hungary, and the last four during his sojourn in the United States, covering a period of fourteen years (Vienna, 1878–92); the supplement appearing from a New York press; and the whole work aggregating more than 4,000 double-column pages. Seven manuscripts of the 'Aruk were used by the editor in determining the etymology of the words, and countless doubtful and corrupted passages in the Talmud were thus corrected and restored. Kohut identified in an elaborate special study (printed in the supplement) the often unacknowledged sources of Nathan ben Jehiel's information, though everywhere defending him against the charge of plagiarism. The 'Aruk has been justly characterized as one of the monuments of Hebrew literature.

In 1880, Kohut was called to Oradea, now Romania, where he remained until 1884. While there he published (1881) A Zsidók Története. A Biblia Befejezésétől a Jelenkorig (introduced into many schools in Hungary as a text-book), and translated the entire Bible into Hungarian. Part of the manuscript was, however, lost, and the work never appeared in print. At Oradea he became acquainted with Kálmán Tisza, prime minister of Hungary, who, hearing him speak at a national gathering of notables, was so carried away by his eloquence that he caused him to be called to the Hungarian parliament as representative of the Jews.

In 1885, Kohut was invited to be the rabbi of Congregation Ahavath Chesed in New York. His arrival in the U.S. was the signal for rallying the conservative forces of American Jewry; and it was not long before he was bitterly assailed by the radical wing. A series of lectures on Ethics of the Fathers, only the first part of which was printed in book form (New York, 1885), clearly set forth his conservatism; and so marked was this attitude and the influence it had upon the public mind that the leaders of Reform felt called upon to institute the memorable Pittsburg Conference, to accentuate their own advanced views and their independence of the historic traditions of the past.

== New York ==
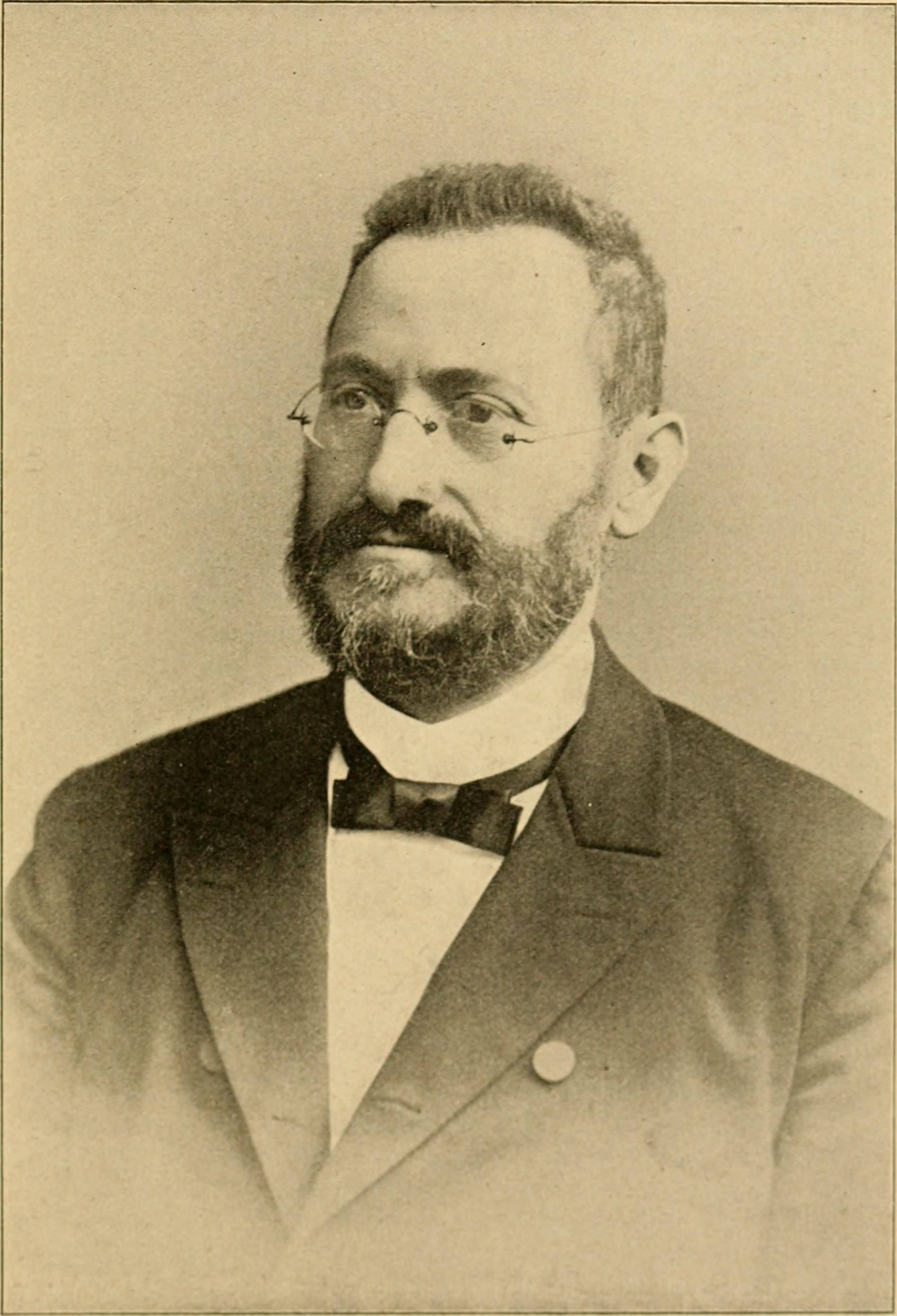
Rabbi Kohut, c. 1893

Kohut was associated with the Rev. Sabato Morais in founding the Jewish Theological Seminary of New York, becoming one of its advisory board, and being active as professor of Talmudic methodology up to the time of his death. In 1889, on the occasion of his finishing the Aruch Completum, he was the recipient of many honors, notably at the hands of various learned bodies in Europe. It was called a "great work", "epoch making" and "foremost work in Semitic lexicography". In 1891 he was appointed examiner in rabbinics at Columbia College. In March, 1894, while delivering a stirring eulogy on Lajos Kossuth, he was stricken in his pulpit, and, after lingering a few weeks, expired on the eve of the Sabbath (25 May 1894). His widow was his second wife, Jewish women's leader Rebekah Bettelheim Kohut.

A volume containing memorial addresses and tributes was published by Congregation Ahavath Chesed in 1894 in New York; and another, containing learned essays by forty-four noted scholars in Europe and America, entitled Semitic Studies in Memory of Rev. Dr. Alexander Kohut, was published in Berlin in 1897 by his son, G. A. Kohut. The latter work contains a memoir of Kohut's life written by his brother, Dr. Adolph Kohut.

A complete list of Kohut's published writings has been compiled by G. A. Kohut, in the appendix to the Proceedings of the Fourth Biennial Convention of the Jewish Theological Seminary Association (New York, 1894) and in Tributes to the Memory of Rev. Dr. Alexander Kohut, pp. 49–64 (ib. 1894).

His son, George Alexander Kohut, often known as "G. A. Kohut," was an American writer and bibliographer, who donated his father's important library of Judaica to Yale University in 1915. This established the "Alexander Kohut Memorial Collection". The son also created the "Kohut Endowment" to maintain and improve the Yale collection.
