= International Council of Jewish Women =

International Council of Jewish Women (ICJW) (Hebrew: המועצה הבין-לאומית של נשים יהודיות), is an international Jewish women's organization, founded in 1912.

It represents the interests of Jewish women in 46 countries.

It has the status of a consultative NGO within the United Nations Economic and Social Council.

== Link ==
https://icjw.org
