= Anitta Müller-Cohen =

Austrian Jewish Zionist (1890–1962)

- אניטה מולר-כהן
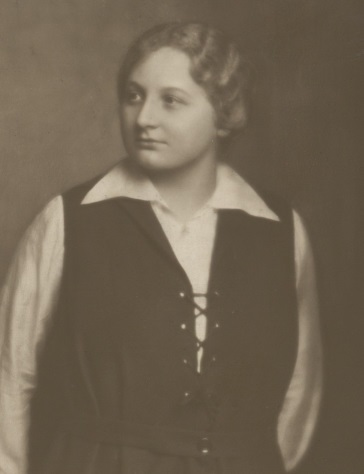
- Anitta Müller-Cohen
- Born: Anitta Rosenzweig; 6 June 1890; Vienna, Austria-Hungary
- Died: 26 June 1962 (aged 72); Tel Aviv, Israel
- Occupations: Social worker; Politician; Writer; Zionist activist
- Known for: Founding the Women's Social Service in Tel Aviv and her work in the Mizrahi Women's Organization

Anitta Müller-Cohen born Rosenzweig (Hebrew: אניטה מולר-כהן; 1890–1962) was an Austrian-born Jewish woman who emigrated to Tel Aviv, Mandatory Palestine, in 1935. In Austria, she was a prominent social worker, politician and writer who became increasingly interested in Zionism. One of the leading members of Vienna's Jewish National Party, she organized and actively contributed to the First World Congress of Jewish Women which was held in Vienna in May 1923. At the American Jewish Congress in Chicago in 1925, she addressed the opening session. After emigrating to Palestine in 1935, she became a member of the Mizrahi Women's Organization, founded the Women's Social Service, and continued her welfare work which was mainly concerned with children and immigrants.

== Biography ==
Born on 6 June 1890 in Vienna, Anitta Rosenzweig was the daughter of the merchant Salomon Rosenzweig and his wife Sofie née Schnabel. Brought up in a well-to-do Jewish home, she is thought to have attended the Vienna Bürgerschule or high school and the Von Hoeniger boarding school in Breslau. She then spent two years at Vienna's Pädagogikum or teacher training college where she may have qualified as a schoolteacher.

In 1909, she married Arnold Müller, a merchant, with whom she had a daughter, Blanka, who died in 1938. After they divorced in August 1921, the following October she married Samuel Cohen, also a merchant, with whom she had a daughter, Ruth, in 1928, in addition to the two daughters, Eliezer and Ester, he brought into the household. She had met Cohen, a keen Zionist, while accompanying children on a recovery stay in Switzerland. The marriage significantly strengthened Anitta Müller-Cohen's own interest in Zionism.

During the years of World War I, she devoted herself to social work, establishing the Soziale Hilfsgemeinschaft Anitta Müller (Anitta Müller Social Assistance Community) which managed a group of institutions for homeless children, mothers and refugees. Her tea and soup kitchen catered to some 3,000 people a day. In particular, she provided assistance to refugees from Galicia and Bukovina.

In 1923, Müller-Cohen made all the main local preparations for the World Congress of Jewish Women which opened on 6 May 1923 at the Hofburg in the presence of the Austrian president Michael Hainisch and other dignitaries. At the congress, she made a detailed presentation on problems facing the care of children as a result of the First World War. During the 1920s, she made several trips to Palestine and also visited the United States where she spoke during the opening session of the 1925 American Jewish Congress in Chicago. At the second World Conference of Jewish Women, held in 1929 in Hamburg, she was elected as a vice-president of the World Federation of Jewish Women.

Although Müller had planned to emigrate to Palestine with her family in the mid-1920s, in the end they first moved to Luxembourg (1929) and then to London (1932) where she was able to continue her Zionist activities. They finally moved to Tel Aviv in 1935. She continued her work on new children and worked with new immigrants, creating Hitahdut Olei Austria, the Association of Austrian Immigrants. She founded Sherut Nashim Sozialit (the Women's Social Service, 1936), and was active in the Mizrahi women's organization but later joined the Herut party. She participated in several Zionist Congresses in Jerusalem and was elected a delegate-at-large to the Greater Actions Committee at the 1956 Congress.

Anitta Müller-Cohen died in Tel Aviv on 26 June 1962 after a long illness. In recognition of her refugee work, on 28 March 1966, a Tel Aviv old people's home for former Austrian refugees was given her name.

== Bibliography ==
- Zweiter Tätigkeits- und Rechenschafts-Bericht : der Wohlfahrtsinstitutionen, 1917
- Dritter Tätigkeits- und Rechenschaftsbericht der Wohlfahrtsinstitutionen der Frau Anitta Müller für Flüchtlinge aus Galizien und der Bukowina, 1918
- Zehn Jahre Arbeit des Vereines Sozilae Hilfsgemeinschaft : 1914-1924, 1924
