= Johann Georg Wenrich =

Austrian orientalist and theologian

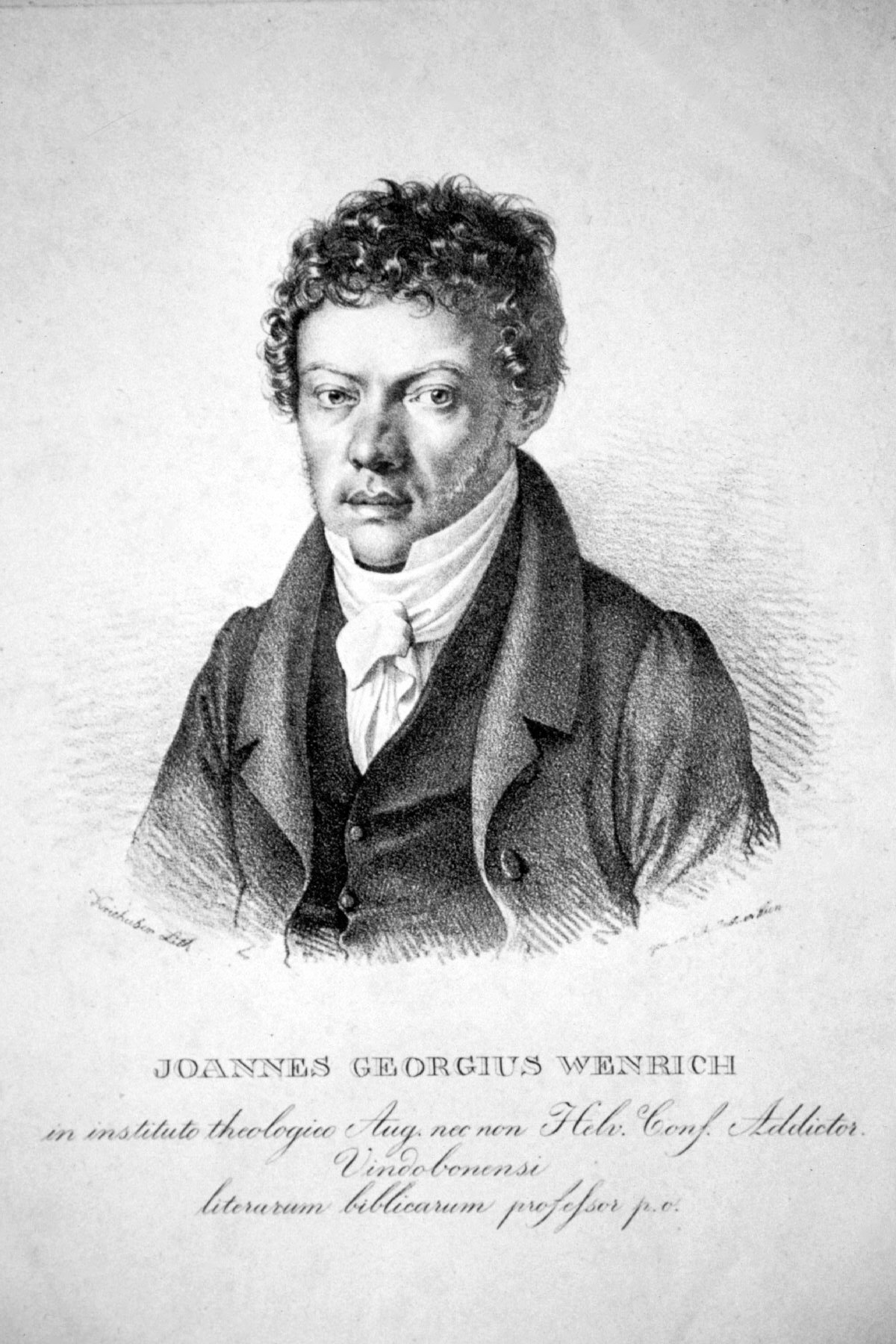
- Johann Georg Wenrich (lithograph (ca. 1830)
- Born: 13 October 1787; Schäßburg, Transylvania (now Sighișoara, Romania)
- Died: 15 May 1847 (aged 59); Vienna, Austrian Empire
- Occupations: Orientalist, Theologian, Professor
- Awards: Appointed to the Austrian Academy of Sciences (Kaiserliche Akademie der Wissenschaften in Wien)

Johann Georg Wenrich (13 October 1787 in Schäßburg – 15 May 1847 in Vienna) was an Austrian orientalist and theologian.

He worked as a schoolteacher at the Evangelical gymnasium in Hermannstadt, where he later served as school director. In 1821 he was named professor of Biblical literature at the faculty of Protestant theology at the University of Vienna. He is credited with giving the first lectures on Sanskrit at the university.

In 1847 he was appointed to the Academy of Sciences in Vienna (Kaiserliche Akademie der Wissenschaften in Wien), however, he died on May 15, before he had received news of the honor.

== Selected works ==
- Johann Wächter, als Mensch, als Diener des Staates und der Kirche (biography of Johann Wächter), (1831).
- De auctorum Graecorum versionibus et commentariis Syriacis, Arabicis, Armeniacis Persicisque commentatio, (1842).
- De poeseos Hebraicae atque Arabicae origine, indole, mutuoque consensu atque discrimine commentatio, (1843).
- Rerum ab Arabibus in Italia insulisque adjacentibus, Sicilia maxime, Sardinia atque Corsica gestarum commentarii, (1845).
