= Henry Malter =

Henry Malter (March 23, 1867 at Zabno, Galicia – 1925) was an eastern European-born rabbi and scholar who immigrated to the United States.

== Life ==
Malter was educated at the Zabno elementary school, and at the universities of Berlin (1889–93) and Heidelberg (Ph.D. 1894). He pursued his Jewish studies at the Veitel Heine-Ephraimsche Lehranstalt in Berlin (under Moritz Steinschneider) from 1890 to 1898, and at the Berlin Hochschule from 1894 to 1898, receiving his rabbinical diploma from the latter institution. He served as librarian of the scientific library of the Jewish community at Berlin in 1899.

In 1900 he was appointed professor of medieval philosophy and Arabic at the Hebrew Union College in Cincinnati; from 1902 he was also rabbi of the Sheerith Israel Congregation of Cincinnati. From 1909 he taught at Dropsie College, as professor of rabbinical literature.

== Works ==
His publications include:

- "Sifrut Yisrael," a Hebrew edition of Steinschneider's "Jewish Literature," with additional bibliographical notes
- "Die Beschneidung in der Neueren Zeit" (in Glasberg's "Die Beschneidung," Berlin, 1896)
- "Die Abhandlung des Abu Hamid al-Gazzali" (Frankfort-on-the-Main, 1896)
- "Katalog der von Fischel Hirsch Nachgelassenen Bücher" (Berlin, 1899)
- Shem Tob ben Joseph Palquera (1910)
- Saadia Gaon: His Life and His Works (1926)
- Treatise Taanit of the Babylonian Talmud

He also contributed to "Ha-Maggid," "Ha-Shiloaḥ," "Mi-Mizraḥ umi-Ma'arab," "Jüdischer Volkskalender," "Deborah," "American Journal of Semitic Languages," and the "Hebrew Union College Journal" and "Annual and "Ha-Toren."
