= George Alexander Kohut =

American writer and rabbi

George Alexander Kohut (February 11, 1874 – December 31, 1933) was an American rabbi and bibliographer; born in Stuhlweissenburg (modern Székesfehérvár), Hungary.

== Biography ==
George Alexander Kohut studied at the gymnasium in Grosswardein, public schools in New York, Columbia University (1893–1895), Berlin University, and the Berlin Hochschule für die Wissenschaft des Judentums (1895–97). In 1897 he became rabbi of the Congregation Emanu-El, Dallas, Texas, a post which he occupied for three years. In 1902 he became super-intendent of the religious school of Temple Emanu-El in New York, and was assistant librarian of the Jewish Theological Seminary of America.

== Published works ==
Kohut was the author of:

- The Index to the Italian words in the "Aruch," published in A. Kohut's "Aruch Completum," vol. viii. (1892);
- "Early Jewish Literature in America" ("Publications Am. Jew. Hist. Soc." No. 3, 1895, pp. 103–147);
- "Sketches of Jewish Loyalty, Bravery, and Patriotism in the South American Colonies and the West Indies," in Simon Wolf's "The American Jew as Patriot, Soldier, and Citizen" (1895);
- "Martyrs of the Inquisition in South America" (1895);
- "A Memoir of Dr. Alexander Kohut's Literary Activity," in "Proceedings of the Fourth Biennial Convention of the Jewish Theological Seminary Assoc.";
- "Bibliography of the Writings of Prof. M. Steinschneider," in the "Steinschneider Festschrift" (Leipsic, 1896);
- "Simon de Caceres and His Project to Conquer Chili" (New York, 1897);
- "Ezra Stiles and the Jews" (ib. 1902),

and many other monographs on historical subjects and on folklore. He also edited "Semitic Studies in Memory of Rev. Dr. Alexander Kohut" (Berlin, 1897), and, since 1902, has edited Helpful Thoughts, now the Jewish Home, a monthly periodical published in New York.

== Pedagogic career ==
In 1907, Dr. Kohut founded Kamp Kohut in Maine. In 1909, he established the Kohut School For Boys, a New York Jewish boarding school. The Kohut School moved to Harrison, NY in the 1920s, and continued there until it closed in 1960.

Kohut established a library of Judaica at Yale in 1915, an important collection made by his father, Alexander Kohut, and the "Kohut Endowment" to maintain and improve the "Alexander Kohut Memorial Collection".
