= Right Hegelians =

Group of followers of Hegel

The Right Hegelians (German: Rechtshegelianer), Old Hegelians (Althegelianer), or the Hegelian Right (die Hegelsche Rechte) were those followers of German philosopher Georg Wilhelm Friedrich Hegel in the early 19th century who took his philosophy in a politically and religiously conservative direction. They are typically contrasted with the Young Hegelians (Hegelian Left), who interpreted Hegel's political philosophy as supportive of left-wing and progressive politics or views on religion.

== Overview ==
Hegel's historicism holds that both ideas and institutions can only be understood by understanding their history. Throughout his life, Hegel said he was an orthodox Lutheran. He devoted considerable attention to the Absolute, his term for the infinite Spirit responsible for the totality of reality. This Spirit comes to fullest expression in art, religion, and philosophy. But the objectivity of these is the State, specifically the modern constitutional monarchy. In his Philosophy of Right, Hegel writes that:

The state is absolutely rational inasmuch as it is the actuality of the substantial will which it possesses in the particular self-consciousness once that consciousness has been raised to consciousness of its universality. This substantial unity is an absolute unmoved end in itself, in which freedom comes into its supreme right. On the other hand this final end has supreme right against the individual, whose supreme duty is to be a member of the State.

— Philosophy of Right (1821), "The State", paragraph 258

The Hegelian right expanded this conception of statism, seizing on it as an affirmation of establishment politics and orthodox religion. Hegel's historicism could be read to affirm the historical necessity of modern forms of government. The Right Hegelians believed that advanced European societies, as they existed in the first half of the nineteenth century, were the summit of all social development, the product of the historical dialectic that had existed thus far. Most praised the Prussian state, which enjoyed an extensive civil service system, good universities, industrialization, and high employment, as the acme of progress and the incarnation of the Zeitgeist.

Many of the members of the Hegelian right went on to have distinguished careers in public academia or the Lutheran Church. As a school, they were closely associated with the University of Berlin, and held many of the chairs of philosophy and theology there. Generally, the philosophers of the Hegelian right have been neglected; their fame, if not their reputations, has been eclipsed by the Young Hegelians, including Bruno Bauer and Karl Marx. They left their mark chiefly in theology. Their efforts did not have the intended effect of bolstering a sense of the inevitability of faith as a product of history; rather, they pioneered the introduction of higher criticism by demonstrating the influence of an era on the development of Christianity. Other members of the Hegelian Right included the Erlangen School of Neo-Lutherans, whose influence continues to the present day in confessional Lutheranism.

Recent studies have questioned the paradigm of Left- and Right-Hegelianism. No Hegelians of the period ever referred to themselves as "Right Hegelians", which was a term of insult originated by David Strauss, a self-styled Left Hegelian. Critiques of Hegel offered by the Left Hegelians radically diverted Hegel's thinking into new directions and eventually came to form a large part of the literature on and about Hegel.

== Speculative theism ==
Speculative theism was an 1830s movement closely related to but distinguished from Right Hegelianism. Its proponents (Immanuel Hermann Fichte, Christian Hermann Weisse, Hermann Ulrici) were united in their demand to recover the "personal God" after panrationalist Hegelianism. The movement featured elements of anti-psychologism in the historiography of philosophy.

== Figures ==
Philosophers within the camp of the Hegelian right include:

- Johann Philipp Gabler
- Hermann Friedrich Wilhelm Hinrichs
- Karl Daub
- Heinrich Leo
- Leopold von Henning
- Heinrich Gustav Hotho

Other thinkers or historians who may be included among the Hegelian right, with some reservations, include:

- Johann Karl Friedrich Rosenkranz
- Eduard Gans
- Karl Ludwig Michelet
- Philip Marheineke
- Wilhelm Vatke
- Johann Eduard Erdmann
- Eduard Zeller
- Albert Schwegler
- Hans Lassen Martensen

=== Hegelian theologians ===
==== Rationalistic ====
- Karl Daub
- Philip Marheineke
- Ferdinand Christian Baur
- Richard Adelbert Lipsius
- Otto Pfleiderer

==== Erlangen school ====
- G. C. A. von Harless
- J. W. F. Höfling
- Gottfried Thomasius
- J. C. K. von Hofmann
- Franz Delitzsch
- K. F. A. Kahnis
- Theodosius Harnack
- C. E. Luthardt
- F. H. R. von Frank
- Paul Althaus
- Werner Elert

== See also ==
- Ritter School
