= Karl Friedrich August Kahnis =

German Neo-Lutheran theologian (1814–1888)

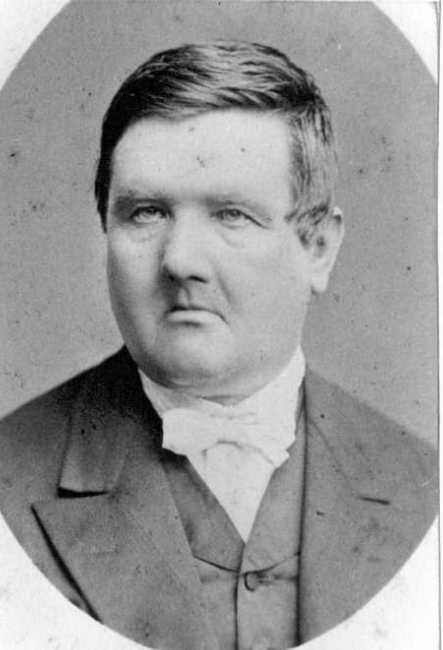
Karl Friedrich August Kahnis

Karl Friedrich August Kahnis (22 December 1814 – 20 June 1888) was a German Neo-Lutheran theologian.

== Early life ==
From a poor background, Kahnis was educated at the gymnasium of his native town Greiz, and after acting as private tutor for several years began the study of theology at Halle. He was at first an ardent Hegelian, but he passed to orthodox Lutheranism. The transition may be dated from the publication of his Dr. Ruge und Hegel: Ein Beitrag zur Würdigung Hegelscher Tendenzen (Quedlinburg, 1838).

At the invitation of Hengstenberg, Kahnis went in 1840 to Berlin, where he studied under August Neander, Marheineke, Twesten, and others. To August Tholuck's Litterarischer Anzeiger für christliche Theologie he contributed a criticism of David Strauss, which appeared in expanded form under the title Die moderne Wissenschaft des Dr. Strauss und der Glaube unserer Kirche (Berlin, 1842). In 1842 he became privat-docent and then spent two years in close relationship with Neander, Henrik Steffens, and the circle of romanticists who gathered about Ludwig von Gerlach.

In 1844 he was called to Breslau as professor extraordinary to represent the orthodox party in a rationalistic faculty, but in his inaugural speech De Spiritus Sancti persona he departed from the accepted doctrine of Trinitarianism, ranking the Son as subordinate to the Father, and assigning the last place to the Holy Spirit, which he described as the impersonal principle of life, binding together the other two. Hampered by the lack of harmony between himself and his colleagues, he devoted himself to investigation in theology, the first results being his Lehre vom heiligen Geiste (Halle, 1847).

== Professor at Leipzig ==
After the revolution of 1848, in which Kahnis supported the king and the established order, he came to believe that the safest defense against irreligion was in rigid orthodoxy, and gradually drifted into an attitude of opposition to the Union (the consolidation of the Lutheran and Reformed churches in Prussia effected by a royal decree in 1817). Convinced that the Lutheran confession possessed neither a logical nor a legal basis under the Union, he joined the old Lutheran party in November 1848, a step making his academic activity at Breslau still more difficult. In 1850, therefore, he accepted a call to Leipzig, where he succeeded Gottlieb Christoph Adolf von Harless in the chair of dogmatics, to which he later united that of church history. In the following year the University of Erlangen gave him the degree of D.D., and he acknowledged this honor by his Lehre vom Abendmahle (Leipzig, 1851), a formulation of the type of Lutheranism taught at Erlangen. He would have accepted a call to Erlangen in 1856 had not the authorities promised to fill the first vacancy in the faculty by a theologian in agreement with his own views. In the same year, Christoph Ernst Luthardt was called from Marburg, and he and Kahnis, together with Franz Delitzsch, who came to Leipsic from Erlangen in 1867, constituted a triumvirate in theology.

In addition to his academic duties, Kahnis from 1851 to 1857 was a member of the board of missions, from 1853 to 1857 edited the Sächsische Kirchen- und Schulblatt, and from 1866 to 1875 was one of the editors of Niedner's Zeitschrift für historische Theologie. At Leipzig in 1854 he published Der innere Gang des deutschen Protestantismus seit Mitte des vorigen Jahrhunderts, expanded in the second edition (1860) to include the period from the Reformation.

The same years witnessed a literary controversy with Karl Immanuel Nitzsch over the question of the Union and confessional latitudinarianism, a controversy in which Kahnis sought to demonstrate the lack of doctrinal unity prevailing among the supporters of the movement.

== Later views and works ==
In 1860 Kahnis became canon of Meissen Cathedral and in 1864-65 he was rector of Leipzig University. Before that time, however, his religious views had undergone a change which found expression in his Lutherische Dogmatik (3 volumes, Leipzig, 1861–68). The character of the work was foreshadowed in the second edition of Der Innere Gang, which revealed an approximation to rationalism, the abandonment of his old belief in inspiration, a readiness to admit the necessity of progress in doctrine, and an insistence on the importance of recognizing the facts of human nature and natural morality. The five divisions of the Dogmatik deal with the history of Lutheran dogmatics, religion, revelation, creed, and system. The problem which Kahnis set himself was the derivation of the doctrines of the Lutheran Church from the basic principle of justification by faith, and the proof of their verity by the sole authority of the Scriptures. He found the nature of Christianity in the community of salvation between man and God through Christ in the Holy Spirit, seeking his proof in history, philosophy, and the common facts of life. It was not the system he advanced that aroused opposition, but the attitude assumed by him toward the higher critics of the New Testament, his readiness to adopt the most of their theories, and his consequent modification of the doctrine of inspiration, as well as his dissent from the dogma of the Church in respect to the Trinity and the Lord's Supper.

Hengstenberg (Evangelische Kirchenzeitung, 1862), with August Wilhelm Dieckhoff and Franz Delitzsch (Für und wider Kahnis, 1863), was prominent among those who now accused Kahnis of apostasy, and Kahnis replied to Hengstenberg in a pamphlet, Zeugniss für die Grundwahrheiten des Protestantismus gegen Dr. Hengstenberg (1862). In 1884 he published the second volume of his Dogmatik, tracing the history of the development of dogma in connection with the history of the Church, to prove the Lutheran doctrines of the present day the logical result of this twofold development. The third volume, Das System, which appeared in 1868, repeated matter contained in the first two volumes, and contradicted the basic principle of investigation laid down in the first part. In 1871 he published at Leipsic a condensation of the historical portion of the work under the title Christentum und Luthertum.

After the completion of his Dogmatik, Kahnis devoted himself to historical studies. To this period belong his Deutsche Reformation (Leipzig, 1872) and his Gang der Kirche in Lebensbildern (1887). He died at Leipzig.
