= Johann Christian Konrad von Hofmann =

German professor of theology

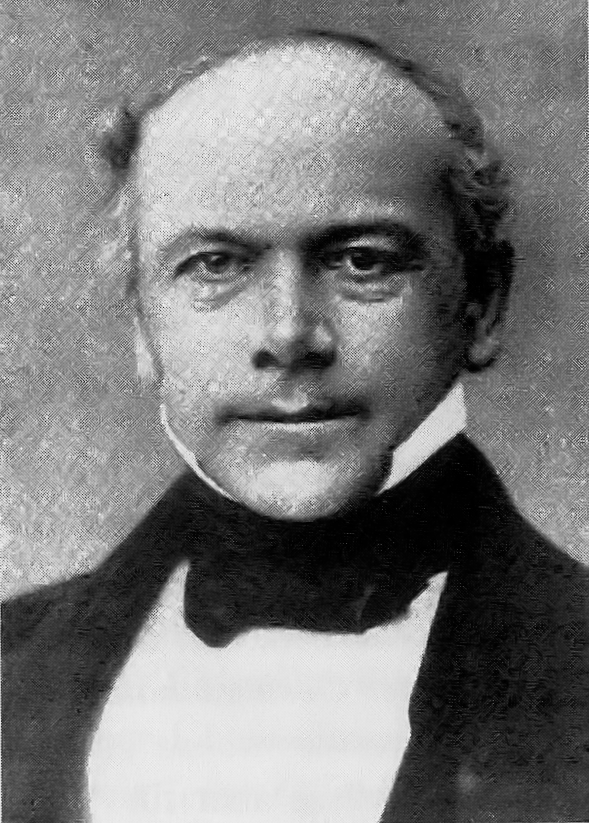
Johann Christian Konrad von Hofmann

Johannes Christian Konrad von Hofmann (21 December 1810 – 20 December 1877) was a Lutheran professor of systematic and historical theology.

== Biography ==
He was born on 21 December 1810 at Nuremberg, and studied theology and history at the University of Erlangen. In 1829 he went to Berlin, where he heard lectures by Schleiermacher, Hegel, Hengstenberg, Neander, and Ranke. The latter almost persuaded Hofmann to focus entirely upon secular history rather than Christian theology. Other figures who had an influence on his faith and thinking included Christian Krafft, a Reformed pastor and associate professor of theology at Erlangen, and Friedrich Ludwig Georg von Raumer, a professor of natural history and pedagogics there.

In 1833 Hofmann received an appointment to teach Hebrew and history in the gymnasium of Erlangen. In 1835 he became Repetent, in 1838 Privatdozent, and in 1841 professor extraordinarius in the theological faculty at Erlangen. In 1842 he became professor ordinarius at the University of Rostock, but in 1845 he returned to Erlangen as the successor to Gottlieb Christoph Adolf von Harless, founder of the journal Zeitschrift für Protestantismus und Kirche. Between 1846 and 1852 Hofmann served as co-editor of this journal, along with J. F. Höfling (1802–1853) and Gottfried Thomasius (1802–1875). (Between 1853 and 1858 he and Thomasius were co-editors. From 1859 until his death, Hofmann was the principal editor.) He died in Erlangen, on 20 December 1877. While he operated with a conservative biblical hermeneutic, he was a member of a progressive political party, and served as its representative (for Erlangen and Fürth) in the Bavarian parliament between 1863 and 1868.

Hofmann stood out among his Erlangen colleagues for many reasons, not least because he was the most prolific among them but also because of his progressive political views. Beyond several dozen smaller essays and editorials (that dealt with both theological and political issues), Hofmann wrote the two-volume Prophecy and Fulfillment in the Old and New Testaments, the two-volume Scriptural Proof, and an unfinished eleven-volume commentary on the whole of the New Testament. He also delivered important lectures on biblical hermeneutics, theological ethics, and theological encyclopedia, which were published posthumously by some of his students.

Hofmann's contribution to the history of Christian theology resides in four main areas: his reflections on biblical hermeneutics, his understanding of the Bible as "Heilsgeschichte" or "salvation history", his understanding of the atonement, and his renewal of trinitarian theology in the wake of Schleiermacher's dogmatics. According to Matthew Becker, whose study of Hofmann's life and theology is the only comprehensive overview and analysis of this theologian's ideas in the English language, "Hofmann's Trinitarian view of God is grounded in the divine love, which is the cause of God's free decision to self-differentiate God’s self in history and give God’s self (divine kenosis or 'divine self-emptying') in history in order to realize in the human Jesus a new humanity. The focal point of Hofmann's conception of 'salvation history' (Heilsgeschichte) is his understanding of Trinitarian kenosis, that the eternal God has become historical by 'emptying' God's self into Jesus in order to reconcile the whole world to God. According to Hofmann, world history can only be understood properly within the historical self-giving of the triune God who is love. Salvation history, therefore, is not separate from history but ultimately embraces and fulfills all history within itself. Thus salvation history (Heilsgeschichte) is not a part of world-history, but rather world-history is a part of salvation history".

Hofmann's Trinitarian theology of history is properly eschatological: History is given its unity and meaning by viewing it from its end—not from its beginning—though its end appears in the midst of history and is discernible only in faith. Hofmann believed, in light of his baptismal regeneration and by faith, that God has already revealed the end or goal of history (its unity) in the event of Jesus, who is "the center of all history". In Jesus the eternal God has become temporal to give the eternal Self in love in order to restore and unite the temporal to God.

Hofmann's historical perspective was tempered by his concern to take seriously the inescapable pre-understanding that every interpreter of the Bible brings to the biblical text and to reckon with the hermeneutical implications that a particular religious perspective creates for biblical interpretation. Hofmann acknowledged that the interpreter’s personal participation in his knowledge and understanding, in both its discovery and its validation, is an indispensable part of interpretation itself. According to Becker, Hofmann's hermeneutical reflections thus form an important development between the hermeneutics of Schleiermacher and later thinkers such as Martin Heidegger, Hans-Georg Gadamer, Rudolf Bultmann, and Paul Ricoeur, who have also analyzed the historicity of language and the historicality of the biblical interpreter.

== Works ==
Hofmann wrote:

- De bellis ab Antiocho Epiphane adversus Ptolemaeos, Ph.D. diss., (1835)
- Die siebzig Jahre des Jeremias u. die siebzig Jahrwochen des Daniel (1836)
- Geschichte des Aufruhrs in den Cevennen (1837)
- De argumento psalmi centesimi decimi, Th.D., diss., (1838)
- Lehrbuch der Weltgeschichte fur Gymnasien (1839), which became a text-book in the Protestant gymnasia of Bavaria
- Weissagung u. Erfullung im allen u. neuen Testamente (1841–1844; 2nd ed., 1857–1860)
- Der Schriftbeweis (1852–1855; 2nd ed., 1857–1860)
- Die heilige Schrift Neuen Testaments zusammenhängend untersucht (1862–1878, 2nd ed., 1896)
- Schutzschriften (1856–1859), in which he defends himself against the charge of teaching an unorthodox understanding of the Atonement.
- Die Augsburger Rechtfertigung der Augsburger Adresse (1874)
- Theologische Ethik (1878)
- Vermischte Aufsaetze (1878)
- Encyklopaedie der Theologie (1879)
- Biblische Hermeneutik (1880)
- Die Offenbarung St. Johannis (1896)

In theology, as in ecclesiastical polity, Hofmann was a conservative, confessional Lutheran, although the strongly marked individuality of some of his opinions laid him open to repeated accusations of heterodoxy. He was the principal figure in what has been called the Erlangen School, although his unique theological positions frequently put him at odds with his fellow colleagues and set him apart. Elected provost of Erlangen University more times than any other professor there in the nineteenth century, he was unquestionably the leading figure on that faculty during his years of service.
