= Hegelians =

Hegelians may refer to:

- Right Hegelians
- Young Hegelians (Left Hegelians)
- Hegelianism
- Neo-Hegelianism
