= Friedrich Philippi =

Friedrich Philippi may refer to:

- Friedrich Adolf Philippi (1809–1882), Lutheran theologian
- Friedrich Philippi (historian) (1853–1930), German archivist and historian
