= Ludwig Adolf Petri =

German Neo-Lutheran clergyman

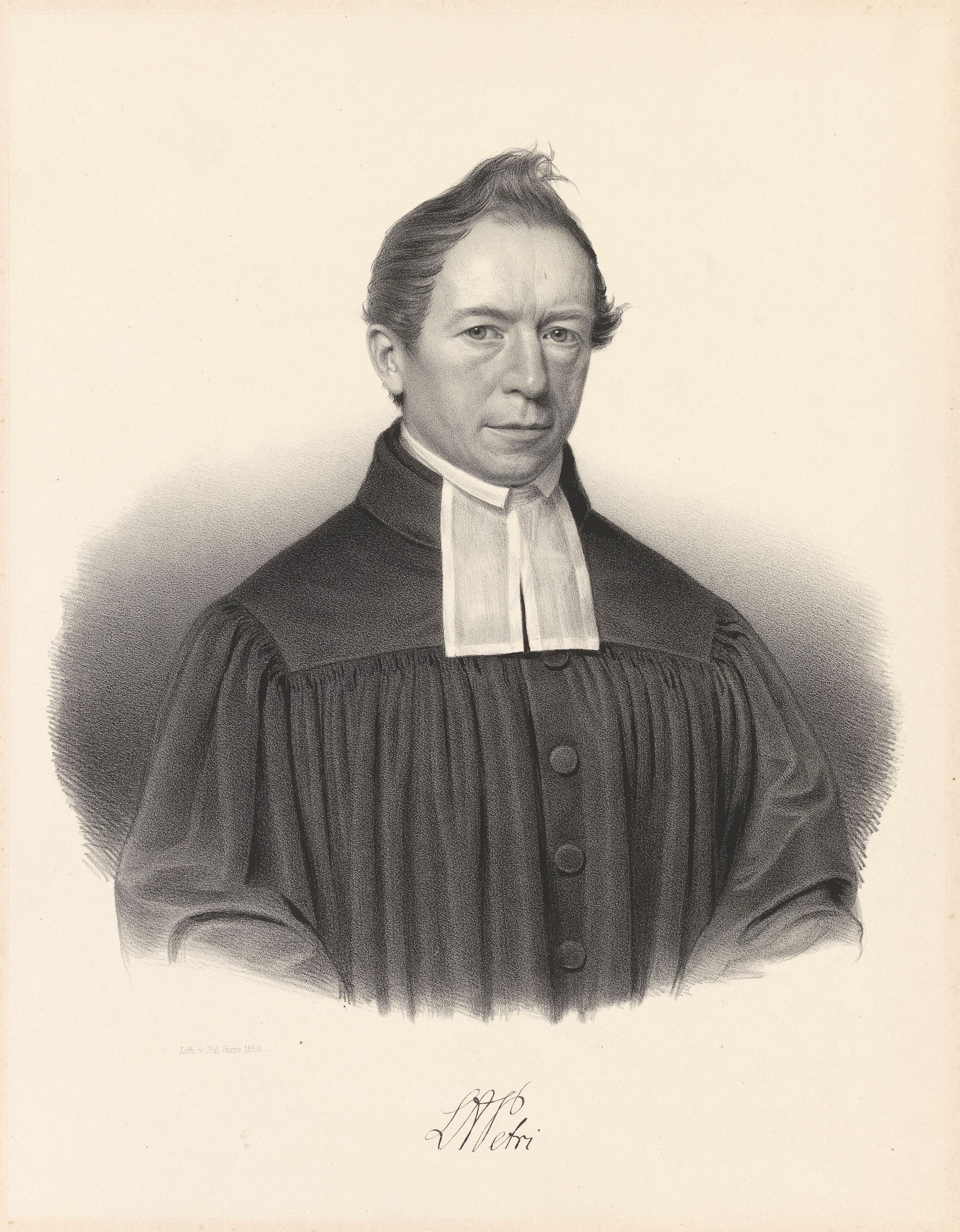
Half length portrait of L A Petri; Lithography by Julius Giere, dated 1850, Rijksmuseum Amsterdam

Petri, Ludwig Adolf (16 November 1803 – 8 January 1873) was a German Neo-Lutheran clergyman.

== Life ==
He was born at Lüthorst (by then a village of the Kingdom of Hanover), and was educated at the University of Göttingen (1824–27) and, after being a private tutor for some time, became, in 1829, "collaborator" at the Kreuzkirche in Hanover, where he was assistant pastor from 1837 until 1851, and senior pastor from 1851 until his death. During the years 1830–37 his convictions gradually changed from rationalistic to orthodox. His power as a preacher was especially shown by his Licht des Lebens (Hanover, 1858) and Salz der Erde (1864). For the improvement of the liturgy of his communion he wrote Bedürfnisse and Wünsche der protestantischen Kirche im Vaterland (Hanover, 1832); and still more important service was rendered by his edition of the Agende der hannoverschen Kirchenordnungen (1852). In behalf of religious instruction he wrote his Lehrbuch der Religion fur die oberen Klassen protestantischer Schulen (Hanover, 1839; 9th ed., 1888), and later collaborated on the ill-fated new catechism of 1862. He likewise conducted for many years the theological courses in the seminary for preachers at Hanover, and in 1837 founded in the same city an association for theological candidates, over which he presided until 1848. In 1845–47 he edited, together with Eduard Niemann, the periodical Segen der evangelischen Kirche, and in 1848–55 was editor of the Zeitblatt fur die Angelegenheiten der lutherischen Kirche. In 1842 he founded an annual conference of the Hanoverian Lutheran clergy; and in 1853, together with General Superintendent Steinmetz and August Friedrich Otto Münchmeyer, he established the well-known "Lutheran Poor-box" (Lutherischer Gotteskasten).

At the same time, Petri was firmly opposed to any amalgamation of the Lutheran and Reformed Churches, and assumed an unfavorable position even toward the Inner Mission.

In 1834 he helped to found the Hanoverian missionary society, of which he was first secretary and then president, while he materially aided the cause of foreign missions by his Die Mission and die Kirche (Hanover, 1841), which can be regarded as an “Agenda of Lutheran Church Design in the 19th Century” (Wilhelm Maurer). His opposition to all movements in favor of a union of Lutherans and Reformed found renewed expression in his Beleuchtung der Göttinger Denkschrift zur Wahrung der evangelischen Lehrfreiheit (Hanover, 1854), an attack on the unionistic sympathies of the theological faculty of Göttingen. After this, Petri withdrew more and more from public life; and the only noteworthy work which he subsequently wrote was Der Glaube in kurzen Betrachtungen (4th ed., Hanover, 1875).

He died at Hanover.

== Sources ==
- Werner Raupp (Ed.): Mission in Quellentexten. Geschichte der Deutschen Evangelischen Mission von der Reformation bis zur Weltmissionskonferenz Edinburgh 1910, Erlangen/Bad Liebenzell 1990 (ISBN 3-87214-238-0 / 3-88002-424-3), p. 270-273 (Excerpt: Die Mission und die Kirche, 1841, p. 4-48).
