= Systematic theology =

Orderly, rational, and coherent account of the doctrines of the Christian faith

Systematic theology, or systematics, is a discipline of Christian theology that formulates an orderly, rational, and coherent account of the doctrines of the Christian faith. It addresses issues such as what the Bible teaches about certain topics or what is true about God and God's universe. It also builds on biblical disciplines, church history, as well as biblical and historical theology. Systematic theology shares its systematic tasks with other disciplines such as constructive theology, dogmatics, ethics, apologetics, and philosophy of religion.

== Method ==
With a methodological tradition that differs somewhat from biblical theology, systematic theology draws on the core sacred texts of Christianity, while simultaneously investigating the development of Christian doctrine over the course of history, particularly through philosophy, ethics, social sciences, and natural sciences. Using biblical texts, it attempts to compare and relate all of scripture which led to the creation of a systematized statement on what the whole Bible says about particular issues. In other words, "In reconstructing Christian teaching, systematic theology proceeds by a process of conceptual abstraction and schematization."

In a seminal article, "Principles of Systematic Theology", Anglican theologian John Webster describes systematic theology as proceeding along a series of principles, which he draws from various theologians including Thomas Aquinas:

- The Trinity: The Ontological Principle (principium essendi)
- Scripture: The External/Objective Cognitive Principle (principium cognoscendi externum)
- The Redeemed Intelligence of the Saints: The Internal/Subjective Cognitive Principle (principium cognoscendi internum)

Webster has also considered the task of all systematic theology as articulating the Creator/creature distinction, known also as the Categorical Distinction or the Infinite Qualitative Distinction, a concept also explored from the perspective of compatiblistic metaphysics by Kathryn Tanner in God and Creation in Christian Theology (1988).

Within Christianity, different traditions (both intellectual and ecclesial) approach systematic theology in different ways impacting a) the method employed to develop the system, b) the understanding of theology's task, c) the doctrines included in the system, and d) the order those doctrines appear. Even with such diversity, it is generally the case that works that one can describe as systematic theologies begin with revelation and conclude with eschatology.

Since it is focused on truth, systematic theology is also framed to interact with and address the contemporary world. Many authors have explored this area, including Charles Gore, John Walvoord, Lindsay Dewar, and Charles Moule. The framework developed by these theologians reviews the postbiblical history of a doctrine, following a treatment of the biblical materials. This process concludes with applications to contemporary issues.

== Categories ==
Systematic theology approaches the theological search for truth under different themes, sometimes categorised as 'doctrines' and the exact list adopted by different theologians and branches of the Church varies a great deal. Some key themes include:

- Theology proper – The study of the character of God
- The Doctrine of Creation - Study of the nature of the universe and its relationship to God
- Christology- The study of the person of Christ
- Pneumatology - The study of the Holy Spirit
- Ecclesiology – The study of the Church
- Eschatology – The study of the end times
- Soteriology – The study of salvation
- Theological anthropology or Christian Anthropology– The study of humanity as relating to God

There are many more themes in systematic theology, such as sacramental theology, Biblical theology, hagiography (the study of saints) and hamartiology (the study of sin), etc.; as systematic theology attempts to address the whole spectrum of human experience and existence through the lens of Christian understanding.

== History ==
The establishment and integration of varied Christian ideas and Christianity-related notions, including diverse topics and themes of the Bible, in a single, coherent and well-ordered presentation is a relatively late development. The first known church father who referred to the notion of devising a comprehensive understanding of the principles of Christianity was Clement of Alexandria in the 3rd century, who stated thus: "Faith is then, so to speak, a comprehensive knowledge of the essentials." Clement himself, along with his follower Origen, attempted to create some systematic theology in their numerous surviving writings. The first systematic theology in Latin was Lactantius's Divine Institutes, and the term Intitutio would set a precedence for works of systematic theology in the western tradition. In Eastern Orthodoxy, an early example is provided by John of Damascus's 8th-century Exposition of the Orthodox Faith, in which he attempts to set in order and demonstrate the coherence of the theology of the classic texts of the Eastern theological tradition.

In the West, Peter Lombard's 12th-century Sentences, wherein he thematically collected a great series of quotations of the Church Fathers, became the basis of a medieval scholastic tradition of thematic commentary and explanation. Thomas Aquinas's Summa Theologiae best exemplifies this scholastic tradition. The Lutheran scholastic tradition of a thematic, ordered exposition of Christian theology emerged in the 16th century with Philipp Melanchthon's Loci Communes, and was countered by a Calvinist scholasticism, which is exemplified by John Calvin's Institutes of the Christian Religion.

The 17th century saw a boom in focused systematic theologies within a renaissance of the scholastic method. Francis Turretin's Institutes of Elenctic Theology (1696) and Petrus van Mastricht's Theoretical-Practical Theology (1680) became touchstone works in the field, profoundly influencing later theologians like William Cunningham, Jonathan Edwards, Charles Hodge, and Herman Bavinck. Similarly, William Ames's systematic treatise, The Marrow of Theology (1629), would become the standard textbook for Harvard and Yale in their nascent years.

In the 19th century, primarily in Protestant groups, varieties of systematic theology arose that attempted to demonstrate that Christian doctrine formed a more coherent system premised on one or more fundamental axioms, often reasoned out as a form of dogmatic theology. Such theologies often involved a more drastic pruning and reinterpretation of traditional belief in order to cohere with the axiom or axioms, and continental theology divided between various schools of dogmatic theology, e.g. Erlangen Theology (e.g. F.C.K. Hoffman, Thomasius, and Gisle Johnson), Mediating Theology (e.g. Isaak Dorner), classical confessionalism (e.g. Hans Lassen Martensen and Herman Bavinck), and liberal theology (e.g. Friedrich Schleiermacher and Albrecht Ritschle). In the United States, Charles Hodge's Systematic Theology became a popular text in conjunction with his work at Princeton Theological Seminary. Significant for this period, Friedrich Daniel Ernst Schleiermacher's Der christliche Glaube nach den Grundsätzen der evangelischen Kirche (The Christian Faith According to the Principles of the Protestant Church [1821–1822]) espoused the fundamental idea of a universal presence among humanity, sometimes more hidden, sometimes more explicit, of a feeling or awareness of 'absolute dependence', and this became a focal point of either acceptation, integration, or rejection among theologians. As such, systematic theology in the 19th century became a sophisticated endeavor of developing and articulating theology from certain assumed first principles, often on the back of the philosophical conversations inherited from Hegel, Kant, and Schleiermacher.

Systematic theology likewise saw a great variety of development into the 20th century, most notably with the advancement of Neo-Orthodoxy and the multivolume Church Dogmatics of Karl Barth. Helmuth Thielicke wrote his three-volume work, The Evangelical Faith, as a confessionally-Lutheran theology with existentialist emphases, and Wolfhart Pannenberg's three-volume Systematic Theology is an eclectic example of modernist systematics that attempts to integrate faith and science. Robert Jenson's two-volume Systematic Theology, stands as a final installment of 20th century systematic theology, looking to questions of postmodernity from a Barthian perspective. Several popular-level textbook-style works emerged during this period within Evangelical theology, from Lewis Sperry Chafer's eight-volume Systematic Theology to Wayne Grudem's stand-alone title Systematic Theology, a particularly sophisticated non-textbook example being the epistemological worldview theology of Carl F.H. Henry, contained in his six-volume God, Revelation and Authority. Reformed theology also saw considerable contributions in the twentieth century, including Louis Berkhof's popular Systematic Theology and G.C. Berkouwer's multivolume Studies in Dogmatics. The latter half of the twentieth century also saw the emergence of systematic theologies dealing with critical themes from social, political, and economic perspective, including the Liberation Theology of James Cone and Gustavo Gutiérrez, the Post-liberal Theology associated with Yale Divinity School, and Feminist Theology (e.g. Sarah Coakley). As such, the variety and perspectives of systematic theology in the 20th century has tracked well with both the broadening of ethical concerns post-World War II, its expansive pluralism, and the advent of postmodernism.

== See also ==
- Biblical exegesis
- Biblical hermeneutics
- Biblical theology
- Christian apologetics
- Christian philosophy
- Christian theology
- Constructive theology
- Dispensationalist theology
- Dogmatic theology
- Ethical monotheism
- Feminist theology
- Historicism (Christianity)
- Liberal Christianity
- Liberation theology
- Philosophical theology
- Political theology
- Postliberal theology
- Process theology
- Systematic theologians
- Theodicy
- Theology of Anabaptism
- Theology of the Unification Church

== Resources ==
- Barth, Karl (1956–1975). Church Dogmatics. (thirteen volumes) Edinburgh: T&T Clark. (ISBN 978-0-567-05809-6)
- Berkhof, Hendrikus (1979). Christian Faith: An Introduction to the Study of the Faith. Grand Rapids: Eerdmans. (ISBN 978-0-8028-0548-5)
- Berkhof, Louis (1996). Systematic Theology. Grand Rapids: Wm. B. Eerdmans Publishing Co.
- Bloesch, Donald G. (2002–2004). Christian Foundations (seven volumes). Inter-varsity Press. (ISBN 978-0-8308-2753-4, ISBN 978-0-8308-2754-1, ISBN 978-0-8308-2755-8, ISBN 978-0-8308-2757-2, ISBN 978-0-8308-2752-7, ISBN 978-0-8308-2756-5, ISBN 978-0-8308-2751-0)
- Calvin, John (1559). Institutes of the Christian Religion.
- Chafer, Lewis Sperry (1948). Systematic Theology. Grand Rapids: Kregel
- Chemnitz, Martin (1591). Loci Theologici. St. Louis: Concordia Publishing House, 1989.
- Erickson, Millard (1998). Christian Theology (2nd ed.). Grand Rapids: Baker, 1998.
- Frame, John. Theology of Lordship (ISBN 978-0-87552-263-0)
- Fruchtenbaum, Arnold (1989). Israelology: The Missing Link in Systematic Theology. Tustin, CA: Ariel Ministries
- Fruchtenbaum, Arnold (1998). Messianic Christology. Tustin, CA: Ariel Ministries
- Geisler, Norman L. (2002–2004). Systematic Theology (four volumes). Minneapolis: Bethany House.
- Grenz, Stanley J. (1994). Theology for the Community of God. Grand Rapids: Eerdmans. (ISBN 978-0-8028-4755-3)
- Grider, J. Kenneth (1994). A Wesleyan-Holiness Theology (ISBN 0-8341-1512-3)
- Grudem, Wayne (1995). Systematic Theology. Zondervan. (ISBN 978-0-310-28670-7)
- Hodge, Charles (1960). Systematic Theology. Grand Rapids: Wm. B. Eerdmans Publishing Co.
- Jenson, Robert W. (1997–1999). Systematic Theology. Oxford: Oxford University Press. (ISBN 978-0-19-508648-5)
- Melanchthon, Philipp (1543). Loci Communes. St. Louis: Concordia Publishing House, 1992. (ISBN 978-1-55635-445-8)
- Miley, John. Systematic Theology. 1892. (ISBN 978-0-943575-09-4)
- Newlands, George (1994). God in Christian Perspective. Edinburgh: T&T Clark.
- Oden, Thomas C. (1987–1992). Systematic Theology (3 volumes). Peabody, MA: Prince Press.
- Pannenberg, Wolfhart (1988–1993). Systematic Theology. Grand Rapids: Wm. B. Eerdmans Publishing Co.
- Pieper, Francis (1917–1924). Christian Dogmatics. St. Louis: Concordia Publishing House.
- Reymond, Robert L. (1998). A New Systematic Theology of the Christian Faith (2nd ed.). Word Publishing.
- Schleiermacher, Friedrich (1928). The Christian Faith. Edinburgh: T&T Clark.
- St. Augustine of Hippo (354–430). De Civitate Dei
- Thielicke, Helmut (1974–1982). The Evangelical Faith. Edinburgh: T&T Clark.
- Thiessen, Henry C. (1949). Systematic Theology. Grand Rapids: William B. Erdsmans Publishing Co.
- Tillich, Paul. Systematic Theology. (3 volumes).
- Turretin, Francis (3 parts, 1679–1685). Institutes of Elenctic Theology.
- Van Til, Cornelius (1974). An Introduction to Systematic Theology. P & R Press.
- Watson, Richard. Theological Institutes. 1823.
- Weber, Otto. (1981–1983) Foundations of Dogmatics. Grand Rapids: Eerdmans.
