= Franz Hermann Reinhold von Frank =

German theologian (1827–1894)

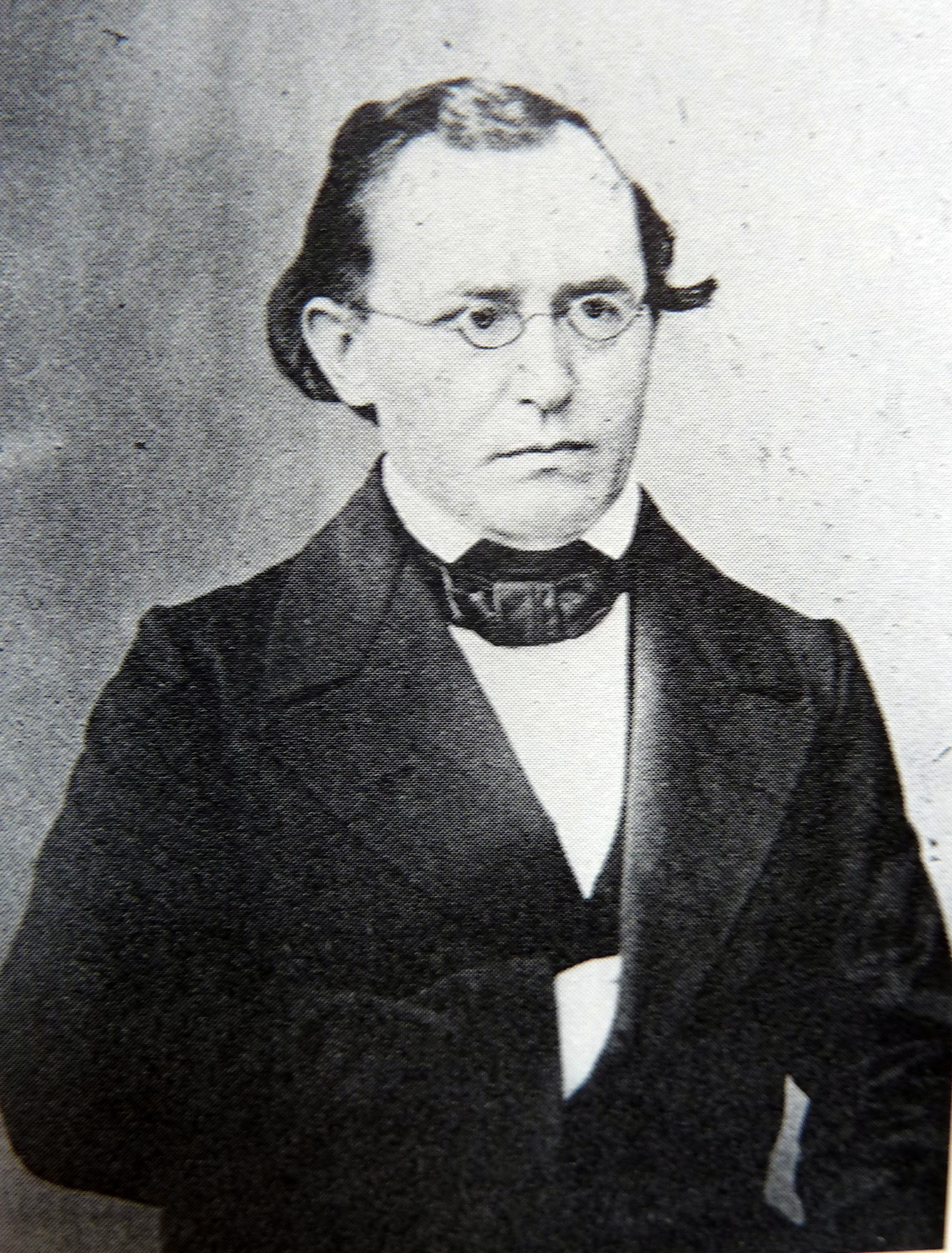
Franz Hermann Reinhold von Frank

Franz Hermann Reinhold von Frank (2 May 1827 – 7 February 1894) was a German theologian born in Altenburg. He was an important figure in the "Erlangen School" of the German Neo-Lutheranism movement, and a specialist in theological dogmatics.

In 1850 he received his PhD at the University of Leipzig, where he was a disciple of Gottlieb Christoph von Harless. Afterwards, he worked as a school subrector in Ratzeburg, and in 1853 began teaching classes at the Gymnasium in Altenburg. In 1857 he was appointed professor of church history and systematic theology at the University of Erlangen. He died in Erlangen.

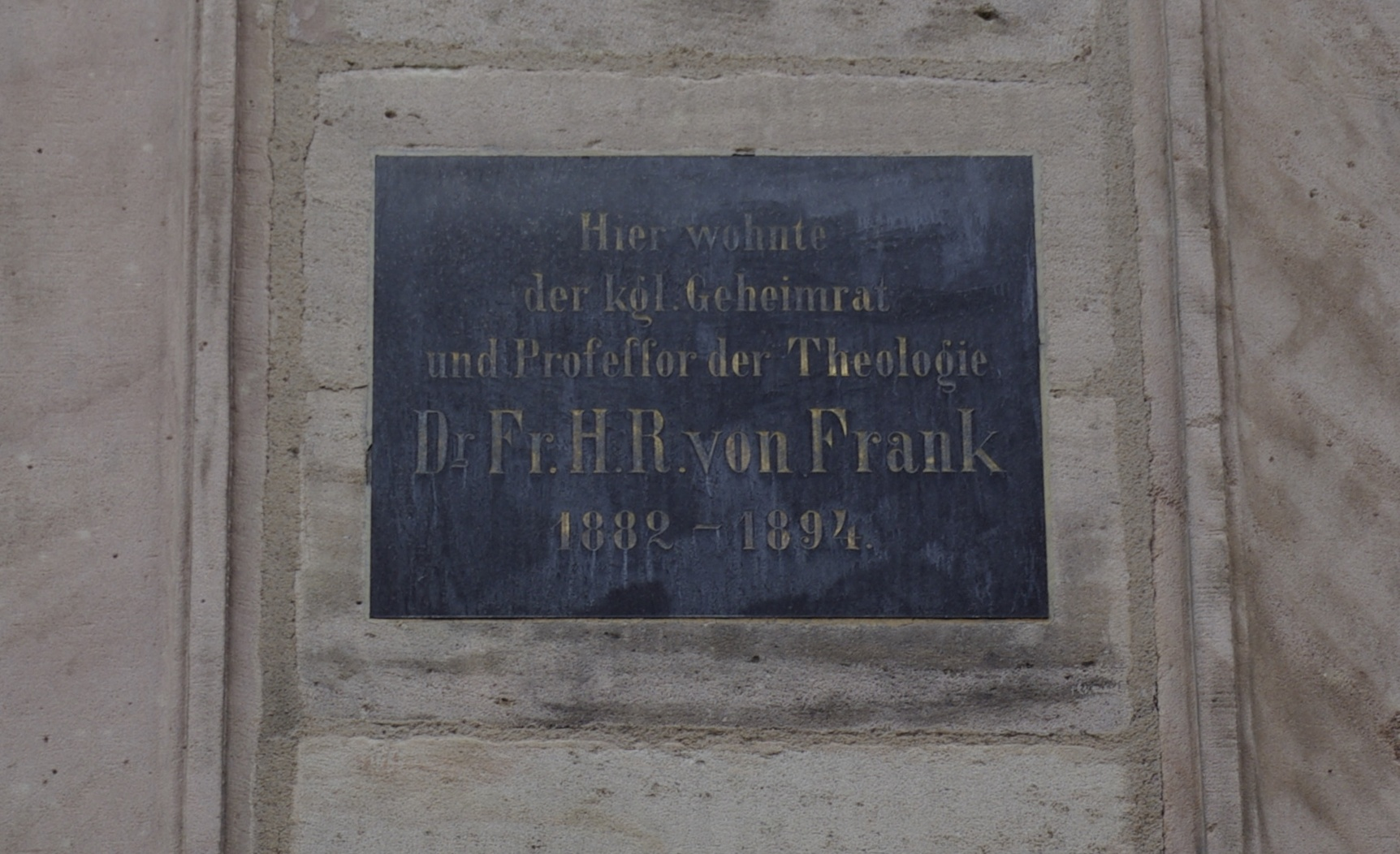
Plaque commemorating Franz Hermann Reinhold Frank at Hauptstraße 13 in Erlangen.

== Written works ==
- System der christlichen Gewissheit, 1870-1873 (2 volumes) – System of Christian certainty.
- System der christlichen Wahrheit, 1878-1880 (2 volumes) – System of Christian truth.
- System der christlichen Sittlichkeit, 1884-1887 (2 volumes) – System of Christian morality.
- Über die kirchliche Bedeutung der Theologie A. Ritschl's: Conferenzvortrag, 1888 – On the ecclesiastical importance of Albrecht Ritschl's theology.
- Zur Theologie A. Ritschl's (third edition, 1891) – On the theology of Albrecht Ritschl.
- Dogmatische Studien, 1892 – Dogmatic studies.
- Geschichte und Kritik der neueren Theologie insbesondere der systematischen, seit Schleiermacher, 1898 – History and criticism of modern theology : in particular, the systematic, since Friedrich Schleiermacher.
