= Sophia Susannah Taylor =

Translator of theological books

Sophia Susannah Taylor (1817 – 1911) was a prolific translator of theological books.

Sophia was born in Westminster, London, on 17 February 1817, the eldest of twelve children of architect John Henry Taylor and his wife Sophia, née Wilford. She lived with her parents in and around London and, after her parents’ deaths, lived with two of her sisters in Battersea, earning an income as landladies. She was a friend of Sir Morton Peto, whose son Basil defended her in the House of Commons against attempts by Inland Revenue officials to tax her small income in her later life.

From 1843 she began producing translations of theological works from German and French, mostly for T&T Clark. Her correspondence with the younger Thomas Clark shows that he found her a reliable translator and would turn to her where other translators struggled. She made her own suggestions for books to translate and her translations were generally praised, making German commentaries accessible to English clergy and theological students.

She died in Willingdon, Sussex, on 14 January 1911.

== Works ==
=== Translation from German ===
- Jerusalem: As it was, and as it is by Karl Johann Ball (1843)
- Theological and Homiletical Commentary on the Gospel of St. Luke by J.J. van Oosterzee (1862–3)
- The Church: Is Origin, its History, its Present Position by Christoph Ernst Luthardt, Karl F. A. Kahnis and Benno Brückner (1867) IA
- Apologetic Lectures on the Saving Truths of Christianity by Christoph Ernst Luthardt (1868)
- (with George Robson) History of Protestant Theology by Isaak Dorner (1871)
- (with Jonathan Edwards Ryland) The life of the lord Jesus Christ by Johann Peter Lange
- Biblical Commentary on the Old Testament: The Books of Ezra, Nehemiah, and Esther by Karl Keil (1873)
- Apologetic Lectures on the Moral Truths of Christianity by Luthardt (1873)
- (with Ellen Deans Smith) Theology of the Old Testament by Gustav Friedrich Oehler (1874–5)
- (with William Affleck) Christian Ethics: Second Division: Social Ethics by Hans Martensen (1882)
- Christian Charity in the Ancient Church by Gerhard Uhlhorn (1883)
- The Doctrine of Divine Love by Ernst Sartorius (1884)
- Scenes from the Life of Jesus by Lehmann (1885)
- (with Peter Christie and John Macpherson) A History of the Jewish People by Emil Schürer (1885–90)
- A New Commentary on Genesis by Franz Delitzsch (1888–94)
- The World of Faith and the Everyday World by Otto Funcke (1891)
- How to be Happy and Make Others Happy by Otto Funcke (1896)
- Sinlessness of Jesus by Karl Ullmann
- Apologetic Lectures on the Fundamental Truths of Christianity by Christoph Ernst Luthardt

=== Translation from French ===
- (with Frances Crombie and Mary Davidson Cusin) Commentary on the Gospel of St. John by Frédéric Louis Godet (1876–7)
