= Münchmeyer =

Münchmeyer is a surname. Notable people with the name include:

- Friedrich Münchmeyer (1807–1992), German Lutheran pastor
- Gloria Münchmeyer (born 1938), Chilean television, film and theatre actress
- Ludwig Münchmeyer (1885–1947), German Lutheran pastor
