= Old Lutherans =

Prussian religious denomination

Old Lutherans were German Lutherans in the Kingdom of Prussia, especially in the Province of Silesia, who refused to join the Prussian Union of churches in the 1830s and 1840s. Prussia's king, Frederick William III, was determined to unify the Protestant churches and homogenise their liturgy, organisation, and architecture. In a series of proclamations over several years the Church of the Prussian Union was formed, bringing together a group that was majority Lutheran and minority Reformed. As a result, the government of Prussia had full control over church affairs, with the king recognised as its leading bishop.

The attempted suppression of the Old Lutherans led many to emigrate to Australia, Canada, and the United States, which resulted in the creation of significant Lutheran denominations in those countries.

The legacy of Old Lutherans also survives in the Independent Evangelical Lutheran Church in modern Germany.

== Prussian Union ==
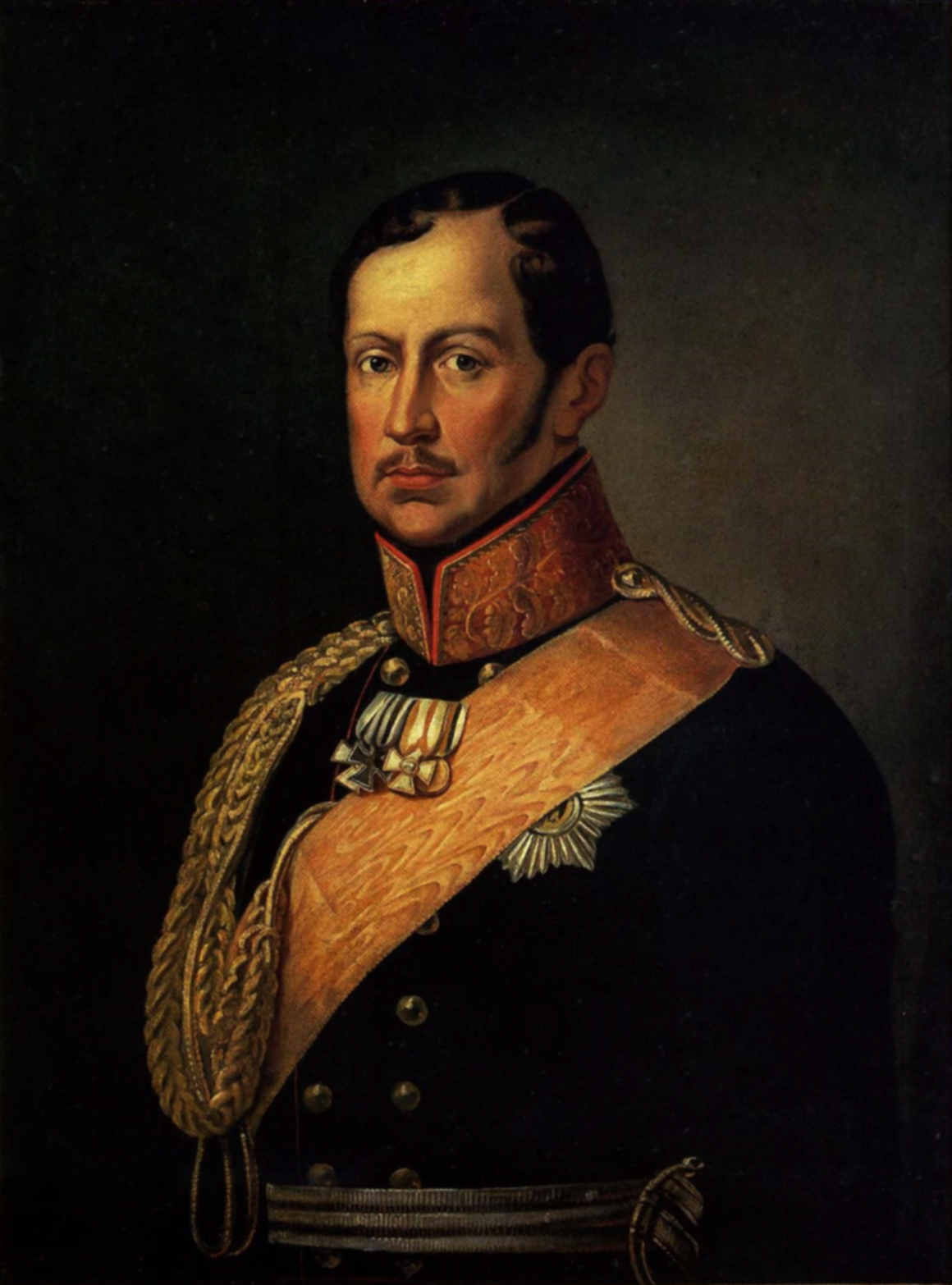
King Frederick William III of Prussia

In 1799 King Frederick William III of Prussia issued a decree for a new common liturgical Agenda (service book) to be published, for use in both the Lutheran and Reformed congregations. To accomplish that, a commission to prepare a common agenda was formed.

After more than 20 years of effort, a common liturgical agenda was finally published in 1821. The agenda was not well received by many Lutherans, as it was seen to compromise in the wording of the Words of Institution, to the point where the Real Presence of Christ in the Eucharist was not proclaimed.

The Protestant congregations were directed in 1822 to use only the newly formulated agenda for worship. That met with strong objections and non-compliance from Lutheran pastors around Prussia.

The liturgical agenda was subsequently modified to appease many of the objections of the dissenting Lutherans, and in 1830 Frederick William ordered all Protestant congregations in Prussia to celebrate the Lord's Supper using the new agenda.

Rather than having the unifying effect that Frederick William desired, the decree created a great deal of dissent among Lutheran congregations.

In a compromise with dissenters, who had now earned the name "Old Lutherans", in 1834 Frederick William issued a decree, which stated that the union would be only in the areas of governance and liturgy but that the respective congregations could retain their confessional identities. In addition, dissenters were forbidden from organising sectarian groups.

In defiance of the decree, a number of Lutheran pastors and congregations continued to use the old liturgical agenda and sacramental rites of the Lutheran church.

Becoming aware of the defiance, the officials sought out those who acted against the decree. Pastors who were caught were suspended from their ministry. Suspended pastors caught acting in a pastoral role were imprisoned.

Among the leaders of the Old Lutherans was Johann Gottfried Scheibel (1783–1843). Scheibel was a professor of theology in Breslau from 1818 until 1830 when he was suspended from his post for his dissenting views.

Scheibel came to prominence as a leader of the Old Lutherans in their dissent against the Prussian Union. He spoke, preached and wrote against the Union, which consequently resulted in suspension from his post as theological professor.

Undaunted, Scheibel continued in his dissent as he moved to new cities. He was in Dresden in 1832 when he was ordered to leave that year. He moved to Hermsdorf, where likewise he was asked to leave in 1836, then on to Glauchau and Nuremberg.

He died at Nuremberg around the time that he was being restored to his post as professor at Breslau.

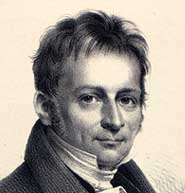
Henrik Steffens, scientist and Old Lutheran

After Scheibel, Eduard Huschke became the leader of Old Lutherans. Other famous Old Lutherans included Henrik Steffens, H. E. F. Guericke, Kahnis and Rudolf Rocholl.

Union also caused a confessional Lutheran counter-reaction, Neo-Lutheranism.

Upon Frederick William's death in 1840, the persecution of the Old Lutherans eased substantially. However, Old Lutherans continued to find themselves marginalised, especially the clergy, which had fewer rights and less support than those accorded to clergy of the Union Church.

Old Lutherans formed several synods, such as in 1841 the Evangelical Lutheran Church in Prussia, seated in Breslau, officially recognised on 23 July 1845. Through various mergers, they have eventually resulted in the Independent Evangelical-Lutheran Church (SELK).

== Immigration to Australia, New Zealand and America ==
By 1835 many dissenting Old Lutheran groups were looking to emigration as a means to finding religious freedom. Some groups emigrated to Australia and the United States in the years leading up to 1841.

=== Australian and New Zealand migration ===
The first Lutherans to come to Australia in any significant number were immigrants from Prussia, who arrived in South Australia in 1838 with Pastor August Kavel. The immigrants created three settlements at Klemzig, Hahndorf, and Glen Osmond. In 1841, a second wave of Prussian immigrants arrived, led by Pastor Gotthard Fritzsche. His group settled in Lobethal and Bethanien.

The Lutherans in South Australia established the Killalpaninna Mission (Bethesda) Station, at Cooper's Creek. Johann Flierl, the pioneer missionary of German New Guinea, served there for seven years (1878–1885). When he left for Kaiser-Wilhelmsland in 1885, his cousin, also named Johann Flierl, replaced him at the mission.

There have been five waves of migration into the Lutheran Church in New Zealand:

- In the 1840s, people came from Germany.
- In the 1860s, a second wave of migrants from Germany settled in Marton in the Rangitikei. Some had first settled in Australia.
- In the 1870s, significant numbers arrived from Denmark and the rest of Scandinavia.
- In the years after the Second World War, many came from Europe.
- In the early 21st century, there has been an influx of people from Africa, Asia and other parts of the world.

In January 1843, just three years after the signing of the Treaty of Waitangi, the first Lutheran missionaries arrived in Otago. Finding that the Wesleyan and Anglican Mission Societies had already become well established in New Zealand, they took up the suggestion that they move to the Chatham Islands, where they arrived on 20 February. It has been said that they had "faith in their souls and next to nothing in their pockets".

In June of the same year, a shipload of German migrants arrived in Nelson. They settled in what is now Upper Moutere and built a church. There is still a thriving Lutheran congregation worshipping there.

In the 1860s, a number of German people arrived in the Rangitikei. They convinced others from German speaking communities in South Australia to join them. Most initially settled along Pukepapa Road in Marton, which is still the location of the St Martin's Lutheran Church.

In the 1870s, other Lutheran migrants arrived in New Zealand including large numbers from Scandinavia who settled in the Wairarapa, Manawatu and Hawkes Bay regions. Norsewood and Dannevirke owe their origins to those settlers.

=== North American migrations ===
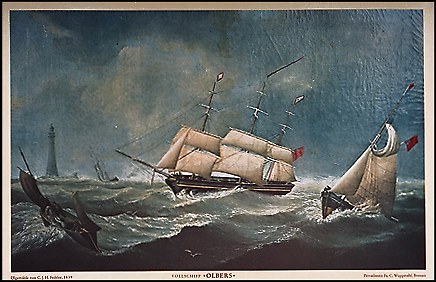
The Olbers carried some of the Saxon emigrants.

Numerous waves of Old Lutherans immigrated to the United States as well during this time. Among them was a group from Prussia of about 1000 Old Lutherans. Coming from Erfurt, Magdeburg and the surrounding area, they were led by J. A. A. Grabau and emigrated to the United States in summer 1839. Grabau and his friends founded the "Synod of Lutherans immigrated from Prussia", later known as the Buffalo Synod.

Thousands of other Old Lutherans settled in the Midwest and Upper Midwest of the United States during this period. In addition to the Old Lutherans, there were also Neo-Lutheran immigrants from the German Kingdom of Saxony, where there was no evangelical union. The Lutheran pastor Martin Stephan and nearly 1100 other Saxon Lutherans left for the United States in November 1838, eventually settling in and around St. Louis, Missouri in the Saxon Lutheran immigration of 1838–39. They were the predecessors to the Lutheran Church–Missouri Synod.

== See also ==
- German Australian
- Klemzig, South Australia, a major colony
- Kulturkampf
- Persecution of Christians
- Wends of Texas
