= Karl Rosenkranz =

German philosopher and pedagogue (1805–1879)

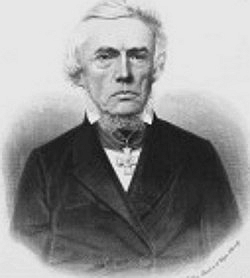
- Born: Johann Karl Friedrich Rosenkranz; April 23, 1805; Magdeburg, Duchy of Magdeburg, Kingdom of Prussia
- Died: July 14, 1879 (aged 74); Königsberg, East Prussia, German Empire
- Spouse: Laure Adéline Aspasie Cécile (née Gruson)
- Children: 3

Academic background
- Education: University of Berlin; University of Halle (Ph.D., 1828); University of Heidelberg
- Thesis: Abhandlung über die Periodisierung der deutschen Nationalliteratur (1828)
- Academic advisors: G. W. F. Hegel; Leopold von Henning

Academic work
- Era: 19th-century philosophy
- Region: Western philosophy
- School or tradition: German idealism Old Hegelians
- Institutions: University of Halle; University of Königsberg
- Notable students: Ferdinand Gregorovius
- Main interests: Philosophy of nature, epistemology, aesthetics
- Notable ideas: Aesthetics of ugliness

Johann Karl Friedrich Rosenkranz (German: [ˈʁoːzn̩kʁants]; April 23, 1805 – July 14, 1879) was a German philosopher and pedagogue.

== Life ==
Born in Magdeburg, he read philosophy at Berlin, Halle and Heidelberg, devoting himself mainly to the doctrines of Hegel and Schleiermacher. After holding the chair of philosophy at Halle for two years, he became, in 1833, a professor at the University of Königsberg. In his last years, he was blind.

He died in Königsberg.

== Philosophy ==
Throughout his long professorial career, and in all his numerous publications he remained, in spite of occasional deviations on particular points, loyal to the Hegelian tradition as a whole. In the great division of the Hegelian school, he, in company with Michelet and others, formed the "centre," midway between Erdmann and Gabler on the one hand, and the "extreme left" represented by Strauss, Feuerbach and Bruno Bauer.

Karl Rosenkranz was the editor-in-chief of Hegel's Collected Works, vols. 1–12 (1832–44). He published Hegel's Life (1844) as a supplement to these Works. He personally met Hegel and talked with him about philosophy. Rosenkranz had access to Hegel's manuscripts, letters, and the recollections of students, family members, and acquaintances.

Rosenkranz's writings on pedagogy were popular in translation among the St. Louis Hegelians. They appeared (translated by Anna Brackett) in multiple volumes of the Journal of Speculative Philosophy.

== Selected works ==
- Kritik der Schleiermacherschen Glaubenslehre (1836)
- Psychologie oder Wissenschaft vom subjektiven Geist (1837; 3rd edition, 1863)
- Kritische Erläuterungen des Hegelschen Systems (1840)
- Vorlesungen über Schelling (1842)
- Hegels Leben (1844). English: The Life of Georg Wilhelm Friedrich Hegel by Karl Rosenkranz (Scholarly Translations, 2026)
- System der Wissenschaft (1850)
- Meine Reform der Hegelschen Philosophie (1852)
- Ästhetik des Häßlichen (Königsberg 1853). English: Aesthetics of Ugliness: A Critical Edition. Bloomsbury 2015.
- Wissenschaft der logischen Idee (1858–59), with a supplement (Epilegomena, 1862)
- Diderot's Leben und Werke (1866)
- Hegels Naturphilosophie und die Bearbeitung derselben durch Vera (1868)
- Hegel als deutscher Nationalphilosoph (1870)
- Erläuterungen zu Hegels Encyklopädie der philosophischen Wissenschaften (1871).

Between 1838 and 1840, Rosenkranz published an edition of the works of Kant in conjunction with F. W. Schubert, to which he appended a history of the Kantian doctrine.
