= Martin Stephan =

Lutheran pastor (1777–1846)

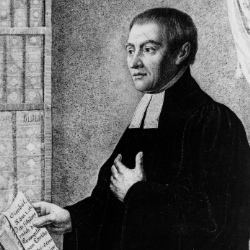
Martin Stephan

Martin Stephan (1777–1846) was pastor of St. John Lutheran Church in Dresden, Germany during the early 19th century. He organized the Saxon emigration to the United States in the early 19th century.

== Biography ==
Martin Stephan was born August 13, 1777, in Stramberg, Moravia, presently the Czech Republic, of Czech parents. Martin attended St. Elizabeth's Gymnasium in Breslau, sponsored by local pietist and pastor Johann Ephraim Scheibel, rector of the gymnasium and father of Johann Gottfried Scheibel, a professor at the University of Breslau. He then attended the University of Halle and the University of Leipzig from 1804 to 1809.

Stephan became pastor in Haber, Bohemia, in 1809. In 1810, Martin became the pastor of St. John's in Dresden, a specially chartered church that had its origins in those who had fled from Moravia and Bohemia in 1650. Stephan preached in Czech and German. For the next 30 years, Martin was known for his teaching, preaching, and compassionate counseling. He led the protest against oppressive practices by the Saxon State Consistory in the state-governed Evangelical Lutheran State Church of Saxony. He came under attack by the rationalist pastors for his confessional and orthodox stand. Stephan continued to uphold biblical and sacramental practices in his church.

In 1824, Stephan began to consider America as a place to practice the faith without harassment. He and ten other men formed a Gesellschaft or society for emigration from Dresden to St. Louis, Missouri. He organized the emigration of 665 people in November 1838 from Bremen to New Orleans on five ships. When four of the five the ships landed at the Port of New Orleans, Martin Stephan was elected bishop of this small band of Lutherans, according to the travel regulations of the Emigration Society. Forster indicates that Stephan was made bishop initially only by the passengers and clergy on board the Olbers at about the time this ship entered the waters of the Gulf of Mexico. Forster states, "On January 14, 1839...they made Stephan their bishop and endowed him with a liberal grant of power to carry out the functions of his office." Only four of the five immigrant ships arrived safely in New Orleans (the Amalia never arrived) and the ships arrived at varying times over the course of a couple of weeks. Of note, after his appointment, it was Stephan who originated the practice of kissing the bishop's hand.

After two months, the Saxon immigrants purchased land in Perry County, Missouri, at the confluence of Brazeau Creek and the Mississippi River. Here they built homes, towns, schools, and churches. The organization of the community was disrupted when Stephan was accused of sexual misconduct (as he had previously been in Germany). Pastors G. H. Loeber and C. F. W. Walther told lay leaders of this confession. Walther made two trips to Perry County to prepare Stephan's deposition.

Stephan soon became embroiled in additional allegations. On May 30, 1839, Stephan was deposed and excommunicated from the community on the grounds of sexual misconduct and embezzlement, leaving C. F. W. Walther as the senior clergyman. Stephan was put across the river to wilderness near Kaskaskia, Illinois, followed by one of the women with whom he had been accused of consorting, and who stayed with him until his death.

Stephan continued to hold worship in the county court house in Kaskaskia every two weeks. He taught German and guest-preached in other Protestant churches until called in 1845 as a pastor to Trinity Lutheran Church in Horse Prairie, a rural church a few miles east of Red Bud, Illinois. Stephan was pastor there for four months until his death on February 26, 1846, in Prairie, Illinois. According to the custom, Stephan's coffin was carried around the church three times before he was interred in Trinity's cemetery. A fence was placed around the grave and a wooden 10-foot (3.0 m) cross was erected. A memorial marker was erected by the congregation in 1988.

== Bibliography ==
- Forster, W.O. Zion on the Mississippi. (St. Louis: Concordia Publishing House, 1953)
- Meyer, Carl S. (ed). Moving Frontiers: Readings in the History of the Lutheran Church -- Missouri Synod. (St. Louis: Concordia Publishing House, 1964)
- Rast, Lawrence R. Jr. Demagoguery or Democracy? The Saxon Emigration and American Culture [online] (Concordia Theological Quarterly) 63.4 (1999), 247-268. Available from <http://www.ctsfw.net/media/pdfs/rastdemagogueryordemocracy.pdf>
- Schönfuß-Krause, Renate: Ein Sachse wurde zum "Luther Amerikas" - Auswanderung von 665 sächsischen Lutheranern aus Dresden nach Nordamerika (in German). In: "die Radeberger" Nr.43 vom 27. Oktober 2017; Archiv "die Radeberger", Ausg. 43/2017 (PDF) Retrieved January 27, 2018.
- Stephan, Martin. The Christian Faith. (Dresden: The Royal Printers, 1825)
- Todd, Mary. Authority Vested. (Grand Rapids, MI: Wm. B. Eerdmans, 2000)
- Stephan, Philip G. In Pursuit of Religious Freedom: Bishop Martin Stephan's Journey. (Lanham, MD: Lexington Books, 2008)
- Schönfuß-Krause, Renate: Kreuzessucht ward Kreuzesfluch(t). Die Auswanderung sächsischer Altlutheraner - zwischen Utopie und Realität. Teil I. In: Altenburger Geschichts- und Hauskalender 2018. E. Reinhold Verlag, Altenburg 2017, ISBN 978-3-95755-033-0. In German.
