= Kenosis =

Christian theological concept

In Christian theology, kenosis (Ancient Greek: κένωσις, romanized: kénōsis, lit. 'the act of emptying') is the "self-emptying" of Jesus. The word ἐκένωσεν (ekénōsen) is used in the Epistle to the Philippians: "[Jesus] made himself nothing" (NIV), or "[he] emptied himself" (NRSV) (Philippians 2:7), using the verb form κενόω (kenóō), meaning "to empty".

The exact meaning varies among theologians. The less controversial meaning is that Jesus emptied his own desires, becoming entirely receptive to God's divine will, obedient to the point of death—even death on a cross, and that it encourages Christians to be similarly willing to submit to divine will, even if it comes at great personal cost. The phrase is interpreted by some to explain the human side of Jesus: that Jesus, to truly live as a mortal, had to have voluntarily bound use of his divine powers in some way, emptying himself, and that it says that "though [Jesus] was in the form of God, [he] did not regard equality with God as something to be exploited," suggesting that Jesus was not "abusing" his divine status to avoid the implications of a mortal life. This interpretation is contested by others, who consider this to overly downplay the divine power of Jesus, for example.

== Etymology and definition ==
The term kenosis comes from the Greek κενόω (kenóō), meaning "to empty out". The Liddell–Scott Greek–English Lexicon gives the following definition simplified for the noun:

1. emptying, depletion, emptiness (of life) (Vettius Valens)
2. depletion, low diet, as opposed to plerosis, fullness (Hippocrates)
3. waning (of the moon) (Epicurus)

== New Testament usage ==
The New Testament does not use the noun form kénōsis, but the verb form kenóō occurs five times (Romans 4:14; 1 Corinthians 1:17, 9:15; 2 Corinthians 9:3; Philippians 2:7) and the future form kenōsei once. (Note: 1 Corinthians 9:15: γάρ μοι μᾶλλον ἀποθανεῖν ἢ – τὸ καύχημά μου οὐδεὶς κενώσει. ἐὰν γὰρ εὐαγγελίζωμαι, οὐκ ἔστιν μοι καύχημα, ἀνάγκη) Of these five times, Philippians 2:7 is generally considered the most significant for the Christian idea of kenosis:

Let the same mind be in you that was in Christ Jesus, who, though he was in the form of God, did not regard equality with God as something to be exploited, but emptied himself (ekenōsen heauton), taking the form of a slave, being born in human likeness. And being found in human form, he humbled himself and became obedient to the point of death—even death on a cross. Therefore God also highly exalted him and gave him the name that is above every name...

— Philippians 2:5-9 (NRSV)

== Christology ==
=== Kenotic Christology ===
Philippians 2 is sometimes used to explain the human side of Jesus's existence. In early Christianity, some groups propounded beliefs of a fully human Jesus who was especially honored and raised up by God (adoptionism), while other groups argued for a fully divine Jesus that was more like a spiritual apparition (docetism). The Chalcedonian doctrine that prevailed was that Jesus had a dual nature, and was both fully human and fully God. Kenotic Christology essentially states that in order to truly live a human experience, Jesus, despite being a preexisting divine being, voluntarily humbled himself. He could still perform miracles, heal the sick, and dispense reliable moral doctrine, but was not using divine might to resolve all of his problems as a mortal, and struggled through all the usual human problems. Thus, Jesus needed to sleep and eat; was tempted by the Devil in the wilderness; could become frustrated at fig trees not being in season; stated that no one knows the day or hour of the end of the world; and so on.

Gottfried Thomasius is the first theologian to discuss and expound upon kenotic Christology by name. Other theologians associated with kenotic Christology include P. T. Forsyth, H. R. Mackintosh, Charles Gore, Fisher Humphreys, Donald G. Dawe, and Roger E. Olson.

=== Eastern Orthodoxy ===
Orthodox theology emphasises following the example of Christ. Kenosis is only possible through humility and presupposes that one seeks union with God. The Poustinia tradition of the Russian Orthodox Church is one major expression of this search.

Kenosis is not only a Christological issue in Orthodox theology, but also relates to Pneumatology, matters of the Holy Spirit. Kenosis, relative to the human nature, denotes the continual epiklesis and self-denial of one's own human will and desire. With regard to Christ, there is a kenosis of the Son of God, a condescension and self-sacrifice for the redemption and salvation of all humanity. Humanity can also participate in God's saving work through theosis; becoming holy by grace.

In Eastern Orthodoxy, kenosis does not concern becoming like God in essence or being, which is pantheism; instead, it concerns becoming united to God by grace, through his "Energies". Orthodox theology distinguishes between divine Essence and Energies. Kenosis therefore is a paradox and a mystery since "emptying oneself" in fact fills the person with divine grace and results in union with God. Kenosis in Orthodox theology is the transcending or detaching of oneself from the world or the passions, it is a component of dispassionation. Much of the earliest debates between the Arian and Orthodox Christians were over kenosis. The need for clarification about the human and divine nature of the Christ (see the hypostatic union) were fought over the meaning and example that Christ set, as an example of kenosis or ekkenosis.

=== Catholicism ===
Pope Pius XII, in his 1951 Sempiternus Rex Christus, condemned a particular interpretation of Philippians in regards to the kenosis:

There is another enemy of the faith of Chalcedon, widely diffused outside the fold of the Catholic religion. This is an opinion for which a rashly and falsely understood sentence of St. Paul's Epistle to the Philippians (ii, 7), supplies a basis and a shape. This is called the kenotic doctrine, and according to it, they imagine that the divinity was taken away from the Word in Christ. It is a wicked invention, equally to be condemned with the Docetism opposed to it. It reduces the whole mystery of the Incarnation and Redemption to empty the bloodless imaginations. 'With the entire and perfect nature of man'—thus grandly St. Leo the Great—'He Who was true God was born, complete in his own nature, complete in ours' (Ep. xxviii, 3. PL. Liv, 763. Cf. Serm. xxiii, 2. PL. lvi, 201).

In John of the Cross's thinking, kenosis is the concept of the 'self-emptying' of one's own will and becoming entirely receptive to God and the divine will. It is used both as an explanation of the Incarnation, and an indication of the nature of God's activity and will. Mystical theologian John of the Cross' work "Dark Night of the Soul" is a particularly lucid explanation of God's process of transforming the believer into the icon or "likeness of Christ".

=== Unitarianism ===
Since some forms of Unitarianism do not accept the personal pre-existence of Christ, their interpretations of Philippians 2:7, and the concept of kenosis—Christ "emptying" himself—take as a starting point that his "emptying" occurred in life, and not before birth. However, as Thomas Belsham put it, there are varying views on when in life this emptying occurred. Belsham took this to be at the crucifixion, whereas Joseph Priestley took this to be in the Garden of Gethsemane when Christ did not resist arrest. The Christadelphian Tom Barling considered that the "emptying" of Christ was a continual process which started in the earliest references to Christ's character, Luke 2:40,52, and continued through the temptations of Christ and his ministry.

=== Gnosticism ===
The equivalent to kenosis in Gnostic literature is Christ's withdrawal of his own luminosity into himself, so as to cease dazzling his own disciples. In the Pistis Sophia, at the request of his disciples, "Jesus drew to himself the glory of his light".

== Kenotic ethic ==
The kenotic ethic is an interpretation of Philippians 2:7 that takes the passage, where Jesus is described as having "emptied himself", as not primarily as Paul putting forth a theory about God in this passage, but as using God's humility exhibited in the incarnation as a call for Christians to be similarly subservient to others.

== See also ==
- Communicatio idiomatum
- Ego death
- Katabasis
- Martyrdom
- Nirodha
- Surrender (religion)
