= August Wilhelm Dieckhoff =

German theologian (1823–1894)

August Wilhelm Dieckhoff (5 February 1823 in Göttingen – 12 September 1894 in Rostock) was a German Lutheran theologian known for his studies on the history of evangelical doctrine during the Reformation.

In 1850 he obtained his habilitation from the University of Göttingen, and several years later became an associate professor of systematic and historical theology (1854). In 1860 he was appointed professor of historical theology at the University of Rostock. In 1887 he was named rector of the university. From 1860 to 1864, with Theodor Kliefoth, he edited the Theologische Zeitschrift.

From 1884 onward, he was embroiled in a heated controversy with the "ultra-Lutheran" Missouri Synod that stemmed from a decision that favored the Wisconsin Synod.

== Selected works ==
- Die evangelische Abendmahlslehre im Reformationszeitalter, 1854 – The Protestant doctrine of the Eucharist in the Reformation age.
- Die Waldenser im Mittelalter, zwei historische. Untersuchungen, 1851 – The Waldensians in the Middle Ages, two histories; Investigations.
- Der Ablassstreit: dogmengeschichtlich dargestellt, 1886 – The indulgence controversy; the history of dogma presented.
- Civilehe und kirchliche Trauung, 1880 – Civil and religious marriage.
- Die Stellung Luthers zur Kirche und ihrer Reformation in der Zeit vor dem Ablassstreit, 1883 – The position of Martin Luther to the Church and its Reformation in the time before the indulgence controversy.
- Der Missourische Prädestinatianismus und die Concordienformel, 1885 – The Missouri Synod in regards to predestinarianism and the Concordian formula.
- Zur Lehre von der Bekehrung und von der Prädestination zweite Entgegnung gegen missourische Ausflüchte, 1886 – The doctrine of conversion and of predestination, second rebuttal against the Missouri Synod's excuses.
- Die Inspiration und Irrthumslosigkeit der heiligen Schrift, 1891 – The inspiration of the Scriptures and inerrancy.
