= Theodor Kliefoth =

German Neo-Lutheran (1810–1895)

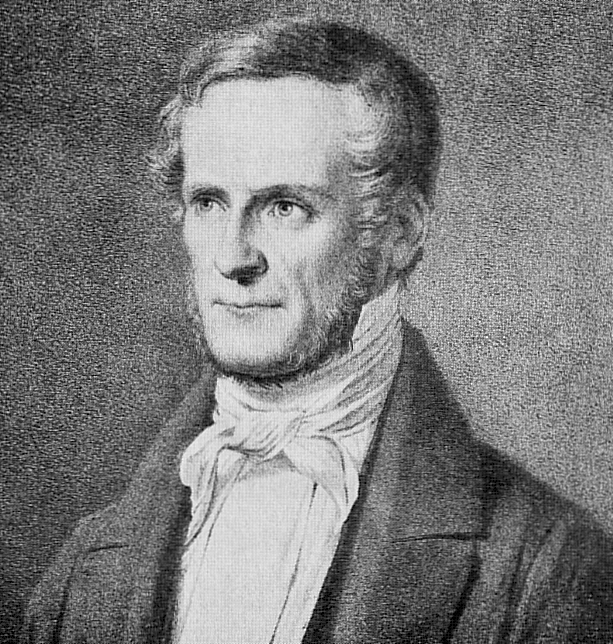
- Born: 18 January 1810; Körchow, Duchy of Mecklenburg-Schwerin
- Died: 26 January 1895 (aged 85); Schwerin, Grand Duchy of Mecklenburg-Schwerin, German Empire
- Movement: Neo-Lutheranism

Theodor Friedrich Dethlof Kliefoth (18 January 1810 – 26 January 1895) was a German Neo-Lutheran.

== Life ==
He was educated at the gymnasium of Schwerin, and at the Universities of Berlin and Rostock. In 1833 he was appointed instructor of Duke William of Mecklenburg, and in 1837 accompanied Grand Duke Frederick Francis as tutor to Dresden. He became pastor at Ludwigslust in 1840, and superintendent of Schwerin in 1844. Since 1835 he had been the leading spirit in the ecclesiastical and theological affairs of his state. With the abolishment of the old constitution of the estates in 1848 and the organization of a parliamentary government, the rule of the Church by the State had become an impossibility. Thus there originated in 1850 a superior ecclesiastical court with Kliefoth as chief ecclesiastical councilor. In 1886, he became its president. During the decades 1850-70, he was actively engaged in ecclesiastical reforms. Being convinced that the prosperity of the Church is principally dependent upon the efficiency of the administrators of the Means of Grace, he was intent upon filling the clergy with the spirit and doctrines of the Lutheran Church. To this end the faculty of Rostock was reorganized with teachers of strictly Lutheran tendency, the institution of church inspections by superintendents was again called into life, abuses in the church service and in the administration of ecclesiastical acts were abolished, and the rationalistic spirit was removed from the pulpit. New formularies of liturgy on the basis of the old church orders were made, and the old treasures of Lutheran church music were embodied in a new book of melodies.

== His Views of the Church and Church Polity ==
Kliefoth laid down his conception of the Church and church polity in his Acht Bücher von der Kirche (vol. i., Schwerin, 1854). The first four books treat of the kingdom of God founding of the Church, of the means of grace, of the congregation and its service, and of the Church and its order and government. The last four books, which were to treat of the development and completion of the Church never appeared. Kliefoth's peculiar conception was due chiefly to his occupation with the old Lutheran church orders. With great energy he emphasizes the divine foundation of the Church through the acts of salvation of the triune God; its divine basis in the Means of Grace, which mediate and vouchsafe the continuous effect of Christ and his spirit; the divine institution of the office of the means of grace; and the necessity of the organization and incorporation of the Church in church order and church government. The Church is for him the empirical congregation of the called, and not merely the congregation of true believers; and for him Lutheranism is not merely a doctrine or dogmatical tendency, but a distinctive church body whose peculiar historical development is to be perpetuated. He opposed the territorialism of state omnipotence, which denied the independence of the Church, the collegialism of modern representative church government, which originated in the Reformed Church and seemed to him to endanger the privilege and authority of the office of the means of grace; unionism, which threatened to absorb the Lutheran Church as such, or at least its confession; and the amalgamation of Church and politics, with its tendency toward the establishment of a national German Evangelical Church. On the other hand, he aimed at the restoration of the Lutheran state churches and the strengthening of Lutheranism through a closer union. In this sense he represented the government of the Mecklenburg church at the Eisenach Conference after 1852; and in 1868 he founded with others the Allgemeine evangelisch-lutherische Konferenz.

Kliefoth was one of the strongest men among the churchmen and theologians of his day, and one of the most effective preachers of the nineteenth century. The political and ecclesiastical liberals decried him as a dangerous reactionist, the unionists hated his strict Lutheranism, the representatives of pietistic subjectivism were offended by his ecclesiasticism, and popular sentiment disliked his hierarchical tendencies. He was also the most notable authority of his time on liturgies and the old Lutheran church orders. His Liturgische Abhandlungen (8 vols., Schwerin, 1854–61, 2d. ed., 1858–69) is his most prominent work, the most peculiar expression of his spirit. Other important works are: Einleitung in die Dogmengeschichte (Ludwigslust, 1839); Theorie des Kultus der evangelischen Kirche (1844); Ueber Predigt und Katechese in der Vergangenheit und in der Gegenwart (in Mecklenburgisches Kirchenblatt, ii.1-55, 169-245, Rostock, 1846); Die ursprüngliche Gottesdienst-ordnung in den deutschen Kirchen lutherischen Bekenntnisses (Rostock, 1847); Das Verhältnis der Landesherren als Inhaber der Kirchengewalt zu ihren Kirchenbehörden (Schwerin, 1861); Der preussische Staat und die Kirchen (1873); and Christliche Eschatologie (Leipzig, 1886). He also wrote commentaries on Zechariah (Schwerin, 1859), Ezekiel (2 parts, Rostock, 1864–65), Daniel (Schwerin, 1868), and Revelation (Leipsic, 1874). With Prof. O. Mejer of Rostock he edited the Kirchliche Zeitschrift (Schwerin, 1854–59), which, with A. W. Dieckhoff, he continued as Theologische Zeitschrift (1860–64). He published several collections of sermons, and a great number of single and occasional sermons.

== Secondary Literature ==
English

Conser, Jr., Walter H. Church and Confession: Conservative Theologians in England, Germany, and America, 1815–1866. Macon: Mercer University Press, 1994.

Klenig, John. “The Liturgical Heritage of Theodor Kliefoth.” In Lord Jesus Christ, Will You Not Stay: Essays in Honor of Ronald Feuerhahn on the Occasion of His Sixty-Fifth Birthday. Edited by Bart J. Day, et al., 105–20. Houston: Feuerhahn Festschrift Committee, 2002.

Masaki, Naomichi. “The Confessional Liturgical Revival of Theodor Kliefoth and the Works of Liturgical Revision of the Preface in Nineteenth-Century Sweden: The Vitality of the Lord's Supper As Confessed in ‘He Alone Is Worthy!’” Ph.D. diss., Concordia Seminary, St. Louis, 2005.

———.Theodor Kliefoth and Theological Revisions of the Liturgy in Sweden. Lutheran Quarterly, volume XXIII, pp. 49–74
