= Neo-Lutheranism =

19th-century Lutheran revival movement

Neo-Lutheranism was a 19th-century Christian revival movement within Lutheranism that began with the Pietist-driven Erweckung (Awakening) and developed in reaction against theological rationalism and Pietism.

The movement followed the Old Lutheran tradition in the Kingdom of Prussia and focused on a reassertion of the identity of Lutherans as a distinct group within the broader community of Protestant Christians, with a renewed focus on the Lutheran Confessions as a key source of Lutheran doctrine in the modern era. Associated with those changes was an Evangelical-Catholic renewed focus on traditional doctrine and liturgy in the German Confederation, which paralleled the growth of Anglo-Catholicism in England.

In the German Catholic Church, neo-Lutheranism was paralleled by the German Catholic theologian and priest Johann Adam Möhler and was sometimes even called "German Puseyism". The chief literary organ of the neo-Lutheran movement was Evangelische Kirchenzeitung, edited by the German Lutheran theologian and professor Ernst Wilhelm Hengstenberg.

== Background ==
Neo-Lutheranism emerged as a Christian revival movement in the 19th-century German Confederation in reaction to the Prussian Union of Churches, in a similar manner to the development of Tractarianism against the British government's decision to reduce the number of Irish bishoprics. The term has been defined different ways to distinguish it from the Old Lutherans, a movement that was a schism in areas that a church union was enforced.

A distinction developed in neo-Lutheranism whereby one side held to repristination theology, which attempted to restore historical Lutheranism, and the other held to the theology of the Erlangen School, which was developed at the Friedrich-Alexander-University of Erlangen. The repristination theology group was represented by Ernst Wilhelm Hengstenberg, Carl Paul Caspari, Gisle Johnson, Friedrich Adolf Philippi, C. F. W. Walther, and others. Repristination theology is more similar to later Confessional Lutheranism.

In contrast, Confessional Lutheranism was to the Erlangen School to be not static but dynamic. The Erlangen School tried to combine Reformation theology with new learning and included Franz Hermann Reinhold von Frank, Theodosius Harnack, Franz Delitzsch, Johann Christian Konrad von Hofmann, Karl Friedrich August Kahnis, Christoph Ernst Luthardt and Gottfried Thomasius.

== High Church Lutheranism ==
Neo-Lutheranism is sometimes limited only to the theology and activity represented by Theodor Friedrich Dethlof Kliefoth, August Friedrich Christian Vilmar, Johann Konrad Wilhelm Löhe, August Friedrich Otto Münchmeyer and Friedrich Julius Stahl, who had particularly high ecclesiology. They were against the idea of the invisible church and strongly contended that the church was an outward visible institution of salvation.

They emphasised the ordained ministry instituted by Christ and the significance of the sacraments over the Word as Means of Grace. However, unlike the Erlangen School, this type of neo-Lutheranism did not have a lasting influence on Lutheran theology. Properly speaking, High Church Lutheranism began in Germany much later, with the creation of the Hochkirchliche Vereinigung Augsburgischen Bekenntnisses in 1918, inspired by 95 theses Stimuli et Clavi of 1917, exactly 100 years after Claus Harms's 95 theses.

== See also ==
- Byzantine Rite Lutheranism
- Evangelical Catholicism
- History of Christianity in England
- Luther's Large Catechism
- Luther's Small Catechism
- Protestantism in Germany

=== Neo-Lutheran theologians ===
- Carl Paul Caspari
- Franz Delitzsch
- Franz Hermann Reinhold von Frank
- Theodosius Harnack
- Gottlieb Christoph Adolf von Harless
- Fredrik Gabriel Hedberg
- Ernst Wilhelm Hengstenberg
- Johann Christian Konrad von Hofmann
- Gisle Johnson
- Karl Friedrich August Kahnis
- Ulrik Vilhelm Koren
- Christoph Ernst Luthardt
- Friedrich Adolf Philippi
- Charles Porterfield Krauth
- Ludwig Adolf Petri
- Herman Amberg Preus
- Andreas Gottlob Rudelbach
- Gottfried Thomasius
- C. F. W. Walther

== Bibliography ==
- Lee II, James Ambrose (2022). Confessional Lutheranism and German Theological Wissenschaft: Adolf Harleß, August Vilmar, and Johannes Christian Konrad von Hofmann. Theologische Bibliothek Töpelmann. Vol. 198. Berlin and Boston: De Gruyter. doi:10.1515/9783110760781. ISBN 9783110760781. ISSN 0563-4288.
