= Hermann Friedrich Wilhelm Hinrichs =

German philosopher (1794–1861)

- Born: 22 April 1794; Karlseck, Hohenkirchen, Lower Saxony, Germany (now Wangerland, Lower Saxony, Germany)
- Died: 17 September 1861 (aged 67); Friedrichroda, Gotha, Thuringia, Germany

Hermann Friedrich Wilhelm Hinrichs (22 April 1794 – 17 September 1861) was a German right Hegelian philosopher.

== Biography ==
Hinrichs was the son of a Protestant pastor. He studied theology at Strassburg, and, following a crisis of faith, philosophy at Heidelberg under Hegel, who wrote a preface to his Religion im innern Verhältniss zur Wissenschaft (Heidelberg, 1822), describing Hinrichs's work as turgid and difficult to follow. Hinrichs was convinced that philosophy was superior to theology in knowing and reconciling with God.

He became a Privatdozent in 1819, and held professorships at Breslau (1822) and Halle (1824), which were important centers of Hegelianism outside Berlin.
