= Arnold Fruchtenbaum =

Russian-born American theologian (born 1943)

Arnold G. Fruchtenbaum (born September 26, 1943) is a Russian-born American theologian. He is a leading expert in Messianic Judaic theology and the founder and director of Ariel Ministries, an organization which prioritizes the evangelization of Jews in an effort to bring them to the view that Jesus is the Jewish Messiah. He formerly lectured and traveled widely.

== Biography ==
Fruchtenbaum was born on September 26, 1943, in Tobolsk, Tyumen Oblast, Siberia, Russian SFSR to Henry (a photographer) and Adele (Suppes) Fruchtenbaum. Fruchtenbaum's ancestors were leaders in a Hasidic group in Poland. His grandfather was known to have the whole Tanakh memorized in Hebrew by age 18 and had been the one to call the final edict on the debate ruling the consumption of tomatoes as kosher for their community in Poland. After the Nazi invasion of Poland, the Fruchtenbaum family had fled to the Soviet Union, where Fruchtenbaum's father was falsely accused of being a Nazi spy. Before Fruchtenbaum was born, his Jewish father was released from a communist prison in Siberia. After World War II, the family returned to Poland and lived in the Jewish ghetto where Fruchtenbaum had his first encounter with the name of Jesus during an encounter with a mob. In 1947, by means of the Israeli underground who bribed border guards, the family escaped to Czechoslovakia. But then a year later, after the communists seized power in Czechoslovakia, the family posed as Greeks and escaped from behind the Iron Curtain to West Germany. There, the Fruchtenbaums were kept in British Displaced Persons' Camps where Henry Fruchtenbaum taught his son the traditions of Orthodox Judaism and where their family came in contact with a Lutheran minister and his daughter who visited the camp to bring food and clothing. This minister would eventually connect Fruchtenbaum and his mother with the American Board of Missions to the Jews (ABMJ; today, Chosen People Ministries) in New York and greatly influence Fruchtenbaum becoming a Messianic Jew. Fruchtenbaum and the family then moved to New York in 1951 where they lived in a Jewish section of Brooklyn. At age 13, Fruchtenbaum came to believe that Jesus was the Messiah after attending Hebrew-Christian meetings with Chosen People Ministries. But his father opposed Fruchtenbaum's faith and forbade him to read the Bible, attend meetings, or otherwise meet with Messianic Jews. The family moved to Los Angeles in 1958.

In 1962 after being forced to leave the family home because of his faith, Fruchtenbaum began his college education at Shelton College in New Jersey until 1965. He then transferred to Cedarville College in Ohio where he graduated with a BA degree in Hebrew and Greek in 1966. He then moved to Israel where he studied archaeology, ancient history, historical geography, and Hebrew in his graduate studies at the American Institute of Holy Land Studies and the Hebrew University in Jerusalem. During this time, he witnessed the Six-Day War in 1967.

Later that year, Fruchtenbaum returned to the U.S. and entered Dallas Theological Seminary to continue his studies in Hebrew and the Old Testament. He also began working as a minister with Chosen People Ministries in Dallas, Texas until 1971. On June 29, 1968, Fruchtenbaum married Mary Ann Morrow, a graduate of Gordon College in Massachusetts. Three years later (1971), he graduated with a Master of Theology degree from Dallas Theological Seminary. He and his wife then moved to Jerusalem, Israel and settled in Jerusalem to work with a local church and train young Israeli Jewish believers for Christian service. Because of their work, however, religious authorities in Jerusalem pressured the Fruchtenbaums to leave after working at the Messianic Assembly for three years in 1973.

During the two years following, Fruchtenbaum served as a minister and as editor of "The Chosen People," a monthly publication with Chosen People Ministries in New Jersey and the same publication that the Lutheran minister shared with him in West Germany. Then in 1976 he joined the staff of The Christian Jew Foundation in San Antonio, Texas as associate director for one year.

Fruchtenbaum originally was of the view that Jewish converts should attempt to integrate with local Gentile congregations, but later came to regard separate Jewish congregations as valid. In Messianic Jewish congregations, Dr. Fruchtenbaum has written, the leader should not have the title 'Rabbi'.

At this time he struggled with the issue of discipleship and perceived a need for biblical and theological training for Jewish Messianic believers. This was discussed with other leaders and this turned into the ideas for Ariel Ministries. In late 1977, Ariel Ministries, based in San Antonio, Texas, was established with the mission to "evangelize and disciple our Jewish brethren." Fruchtenbaum is the founding director of Ariel Ministries and continues in this role and as a speaker at conferences.

He travels internationally throughout Europe, Israel and the United States. This has given him a broad knowledge of the messianic movement. He completed his doctoral dissertation, Israelology: The Missing Link in Systematic Theology at New York University in 1989. Fruchtenbaum has published a number of books and recorded many biblical studies.

== Ariel Ministries ==
Fruchtenbaum is the founder of Ariel Ministries. Ariel Ministries was created on December 1, 1977, in San Antonio, Texas to evangelize and disciple Jewish Christians while emphasizing the importance of Bible doctrine and theology. Their name, "Ariel," means "Lion of God" in reference to Messiah Yeshua as the Lion of Judah. Ariel Ministries has branches in Australia, Canada, Germany, Hungary, India, Israel, New Zealand, and the United States and partners with Gafen International and Messiah Comes.

In September 2024, Tim Sigler was appointed as Fruchtenbaum's successor and currently serves as Ariel Ministries' chief executive officer.

== Theology ==
Fruchtenbaum is a Messianic Jew who believes that the Bible is inspired by the Word of God and is inerrant and is the authority in all things related to faith and practices and all of which it speaks. He believes in the full deity of Jesus Christ.

His theology is largely traditional dispensational with some variation only in detail. The eschatological viewpoint retains a role for Israel and Jewish believers in his view of future theology.

Dispensationalism holds that God is faithful to keep His promises to the Jewish people... Dispensationalism makes the most sense biblically because it takes the Bible literally unless the text indicates otherwise, and that is a safe position to be in.

— Arnold Fruchtenbaum, "Dispensationalism and Covenant Theology: Q & A", Bible Prophecy Blog (July 24, 2010)

Fruchtenbaum continues to teach based on what some call a "Midrashic Hermeneutic", his particular focus is on the Judaic background of the Gospels.

== Works ==
=== Books ===
- Fruchtenbaum, Arnold (1970). A Passover Haggadah for Jewish Believers. Tustin, CA: Ariel Ministries.
- ——— (1971). Jewishness and Hebrew Christianity. Chosen People Publications.
- ——— (1974). Hebrew Christianity: Its Theology, History & Philosophy. Washington: Canon Press. ISBN 978-0-9136-8611-9.
- ——— (1981). Jesus was a Jew. Nashville, TN: Broadman Press. ISBN 978-0-8054-6209-8.
- ——— (1983). Biblical Lovemaking: A Study of the Song of Solomon. San Antonio, TX: Ariel Press. ISBN 978-0-9148-6303-8.
- ——— (1983). Footsteps of the Messiah: A Study of the Sequence of Prophetic Events. San Antonio, TX: Ariel Press.
- ——— (1989). Israelology: The Missing Link in Systematic Theology. Tustin, CA: Ariel Ministries. ISBN 978-0-9148-6305-2.
- ——— (1998). Messianic Christology. Tustin, CA: Ariel Ministries. ISBN 978-0-9148-6307-6.
- ——— (1999). A Study Guide of Israel: Historical & Geographical. Tustin, CA: Ariel Ministries.
- ——— (2003). Footsteps of the Messiah: A Study of the Sequence of Prophetic Events (rev. ed.). Tustin, CA: Ariel Ministries. ISBN 978-0-9148-6309-0.

=== Bible commentary series ===
- Fruchtenbaum, Arnold (2004). The Messianic Jewish Epistles - Hebrews, James, I Peter, II Peter, Jude. Tustin, CA: Ariel Ministries. ISBN 978-0-9148-6311-3.
- ——— (2006). Judges & Ruth. Tustin, CA: Ariel Ministries. ISBN 978-0-9765-2523-3.
- ——— (2008). The Book of Genesis. Tustin, CA: Ariel Ministries. ISBN 978-1-9351-7400-4.
- ——— (2018). The Book of Joshua. Tustin, CA: Ariel Ministries. ISBN 978-1-9510-5980-4.
- ——— (2018). The Book of Isaiah. Tustin, CA: Ariel Ministries. ISBN 978-1-9510-5987-3.
- ——— (2020). The Book of Acts. Tustin, CA: Ariel Ministries. ISBN 978-1-9510-5966-8.
- ——— (2022). The Book of Romans. Tustin, CA: Ariel Ministries. ISBN 978-1-9510-5994-1.

=== Chapters and articles ===
- Fruchtenbaum, Arnold; et al. (1999). Crouch, Mal (ed.). A Bible Handbook to The Acts of The Apostles. Grand Rapids, MI: Kregal. ISBN 978-0-8254-2391-8.
- ———; et al. (1999). Crouch, Mal (ed.). A Biblical Theology of The Church. Grand Rapids, MI: Kregal. ISBN 978-0-8254-2411-3.
- ———; et al. (2000). Crouch, Mal (ed.). The Fundamentals For The 21st Century: Examining The Crucial Issues of The Christian Faith. Grand Rapids, MI: Kregal. ISBN 978-0-8254-2368-0.
- ———; et al. (2001). Cohn-Sherbok, Daniel C. (ed.). Voices of Messianic Judaism: Confronting Critical Issues Facing a Maturing Movement. Clarksville, MD: Lederer/Messianic Jewish Publisher. ISBN 978-1-8802-2693-3.
- ———; et al. (2003). LaHaye, Tim; Ice, Thomas (eds.). The End Times Controversy: The Second Coming Under Attack. Eugene, OR: Harvest House. ISBN 978-0-7369-0953-2.
- ———; et al. (2003). How Jewish Is Christianity?: 2 Views on the Messianic Movement. Counterpoints: Bible and Theology. Grand Rapids, MI: Zondervan. ISBN 978-0-3102-4490-5.
- ———; et al. (2005). One World.

=== Systematic theology correspondence courses ===
- Fruchtenbaum, Arnold, Bibliology: The Doctrine of the Scriptures.
- ———, Theology Proper: The Doctrine of God.
- ———, Christology: The Doctrine of the Son.
- ———, Pneumatology: The Doctrine of the Holy Spirit.
- ———, Soteriology: The Doctrine of Salvation.
- ———, Anthropology: The Doctrine of Man & Hamartiology: The Doctrine of Sin.
- ———, Angelology: The Doctrine of Angels (Elect and Fallen).

== Sources ==
- "Biography of Dr. Arnold Fruchtenbaum". Ariel Ministries Website. Archived from the original on 2005-11-25.
