= Leopold von Henning =

German philosopher (1791–1866)

Leopold August Wilhelm Dorotheus von Henning (originally von Henning auf Schönhoff; 4 October 1791 – 5 October 1866) was a German philosopher associated with the Hegelian Right.

== Biography ==
Leopold von Henning was born in Gotha in 1791 to Colonel Christian von Henning (1748–1809). He studied history, law and philosophy at Heidelberg University; and, following participation in the wars of liberation, economics at the University of Vienna. In 1815 he began his training in Königsberg in der Neumark. After re-participation in the war, he held a clerkship in Erfurt, and from 1818 onwards, lived in Berlin. He was a student of Hegel's and a friend of Friedrich Wilhelm Carové. Due to the Persecution of Demagogues, he was arrested on 8 July 1819 but released ten weeks later. He received his doctorate in 1821 at the University of Berlin.

In 1823, he married Emilie Krutisch (180–1853). The couple had three sons and seven daughters, including Laura Henning (1826–1911), who married the lawyer Berthold Delbrück (1817–1868) and was the mother of historian Hans Delbrück (1848–1929) and chemist Max Delbrück (1850–1919).

In 1825, von Henning was appointed associate professor of philosophy at the University of Berlin; in 1835 he was awarded a full professorship. From 1827 he was editor of the Jahrbücher für wissenschaftliche Kritik (Annals for scientific criticism), which for 20 years was the most influential Hegelian magazine.

In a document from 1839, he was one of the owners of the Henningshofs in Wandersleben, being named as the ancestral seat of the Henning family.

Henning died in Berlin in 1866, aged 75.
