= Johann Wilhelm Friedrich Höfling =

German Lutheran theologian (1802–1853)

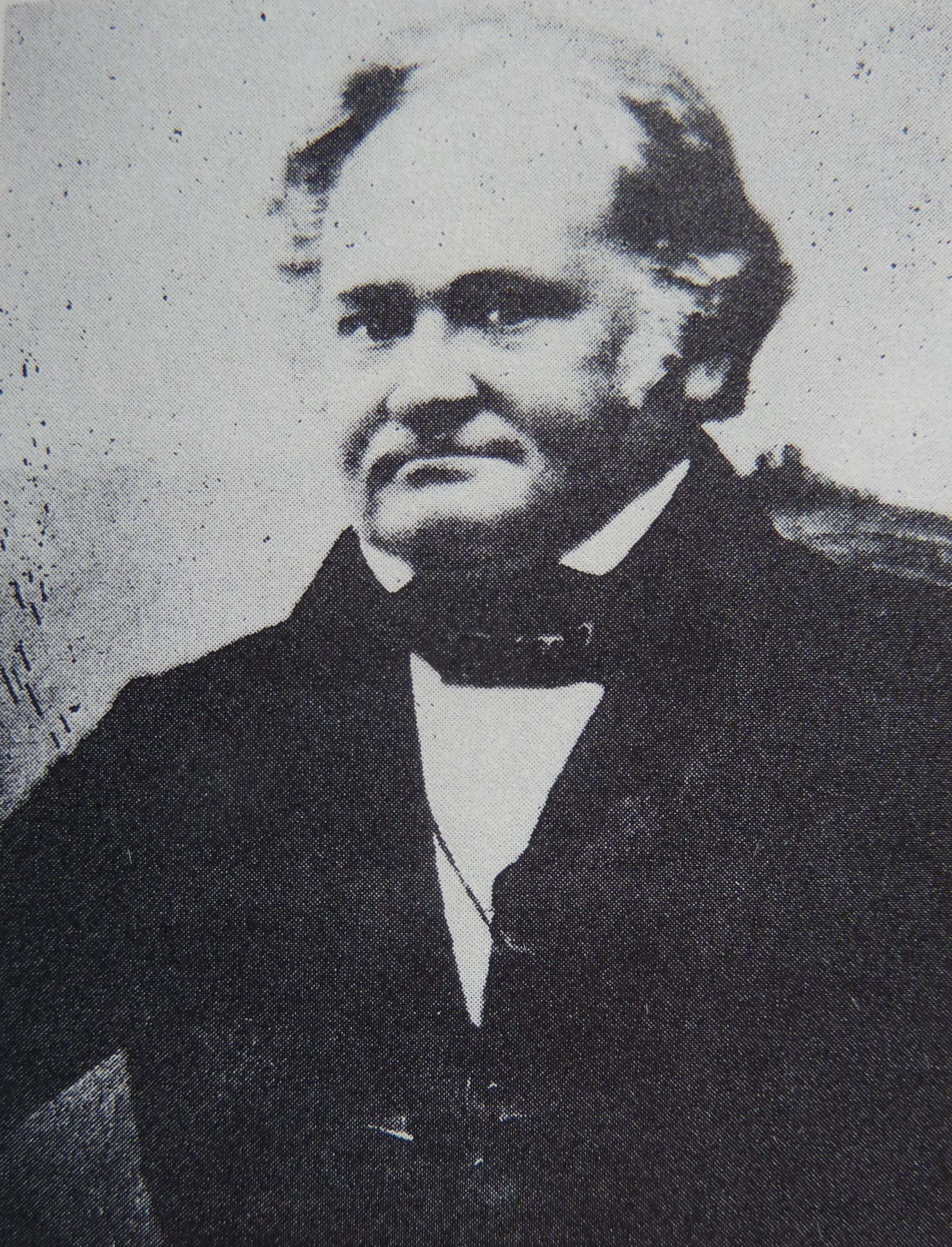
Johann Wilhelm Friedrich Höfling (ca. 1845)

Johann Wilhelm Friedrich Höfling (30 December 1802 – 5 April 1853) was a German Lutheran theologian born in Neudrossenfeld, Bavaria. He specialized in the field of liturgical science.

He studied philology and theology at Erlangen, and following his theological exam served as a vicar in Würzburg (1823) and as a minister in Nuremberg (1827). In 1831 he earned his doctorate in philosophy at Tübingen, and in 1835 received his theological degree. In 1833 he was appointed professor of practical theology at the University of Erlangen. He died in Munich.

== Published works ==
Höfling was a prominent member of the so-called "Erlangen School" within the German Neo-Lutheranism movement. He collaborated with Gottlieb Christian Harless (1806–1879) on edition of the periodical "Zeitschrift für Protestantismus und Kirche". Among his more important publications are the following:

- Das Sacrament der Taufe nebst den anderen damit zusammenhängenden Akten der Initiation, (The sacrament of baptism, together with other related acts of initiation); (volume 1- 1846, volume 2- 1848).
- Grundsätze evangelisch-lutherischer Kirchenverfassung,(Principles of Evangelical Lutheran faith) 1850.
- Die Lehre der ältesten Kirche vom Opfer im Leben und Cultus der Christen, Zeugenverhör in einer Reihe akademischer Programme, angestellt, (The teaching of the Early Christian Church in regards to sacrifice in the life and worship of Christians) 1851.
- Publications about Höfling:
- Johann Wilhelm Friedrich Höfling. Leben und Werk by Manfred Kiesseg, Gütersloh, Mohn 1991.
