= Christoph Ernst Luthardt =

German Lutheran theologian, Biblical commentator and Christian apologist

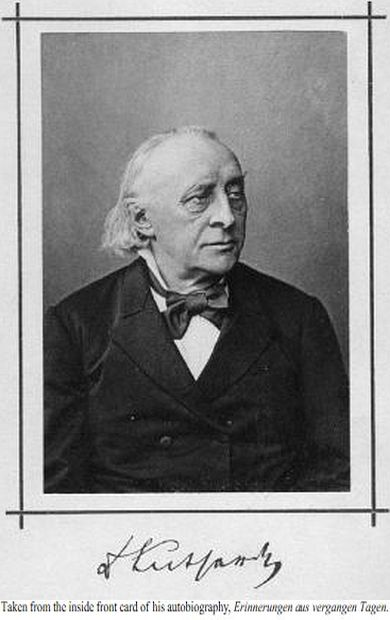
- Luthardt c. 1891, a flyleaf of his autobiography published 1891
- Born: 22 March 1823; Maroldsweisach, Bavaria.
- Died: 21 September 1902 (aged 79); Leipzig, Saxony
- Education: Theology in Erlangen, Berlin (1841-1845), Munich (1846+-1847), Erlangen; Doctoral Licentiate of Theology, University of Erlangen (1852)
- Spouses: Maria (m. 1850–1867) Fanny (m. 1869–1902)
- Church: Lutheran
- Offices held: Professor of Dogmatic theology and exegesis at the University of Marburg (1854-1856).; Professor of Lutheran Theology at the University of Leipzig (1856-1896).; Dean of the Faculty of Theology (1860-1861), (1866-1867), (1869-1870), (1876-1877) & (1884-1885).

Christoph Ernst Luthardt (22 March 1823– 21 September 1902), was a conservative German Lutheran theologian, Biblical commentator and Christian apologist. He was born in Maroldsweisach, Bavaria.

== Biography ==
From 1841 to 1845 he studied theology at Erlangen and Berlin, and in 1854 became an associate professor of dogmatic theology and exegesis at the University of Marburg. In 1856 he became professor ordinarius of systematic theology and New Testament exegesis at Leipzig. On five occasions he was dean of the Leipzig theology faculty. In 1865 he was made a counsellor to the State Consistory of the Lutheran Church of Saxony, in 1871 canon of Meissen Cathedral, and in 1887 a privy councillor to the church. In 1868 he founded the Allgemeinen Evangelisch-Lutherischen Konferenz. He died at Leipzig.

A strictly orthodox theologian and a clear writer, Luthardt became widely appreciated as the author of apologetic lectures. These were collected under the title Apologie des Christentums (vol. i., 1864, 14th ed. 1896; vol. ii. 7th ed., 1901; vol. iii. 7th ed., 1898; vol. iv. 2nd ed., 1880), a work of which the first three volumes have been translated into English. In 1868 he founded and edited the Allgemeine Evangelisch-Lutherischen Kirchenzeitung, with its supplement, the Theologisches Litteraturblatt, and in 1880 became editor of the Zeitschrift für Kirchliche Wissenschaft und Kirchliches Leben.

== Additional published works ==
- Die Offenbarung des Johannes (1861).
- Das johanneische Evangelium nach seiner Eigenthümlichkeit geschildert und erklärt (1852–1853; 2nd edition in 2 volumes, 1875–1876); Later translated into English and published as "St. John's Gospel described and explained according to its peculiar character" (3 volumes, 1876–78).
- Kompendium der Dogmatik (1865; 9th edition, 1893).
- "The church : its origin, its history, its present position", by Luthardt, Karl Friedrich August Kahnis and Bruno Brückner; translated from the German by Sophia Taylor (1867).
- Gnade und Wahrheit (1874).
- Examen Concilii Tridentini A condensed version of Martin Chemntiz's 4 volume work condensed to a single volume of 287 pages, (1884).
- Lehre von den letzten Dingen : In Abhandlungen Und Schriftauslegungen Dargestellt (1861; 3rd edition 1885).
- Geschichte der christlichen Ethik (2 volumes, 1888–1893) — History of Christian ethics. I. History of Christian ethics before the reformation. (translated from the German by W. Hastie, 1889).
- "An introduction to dogmatic theology : based on Luthardt" by Revere Franklin Weidner (1895).

His autobiography was published with the title Erinnerungen aus vergangenen Tagen (1889; 2nd edition, 1891).
