= Friedrich Münchmeyer =

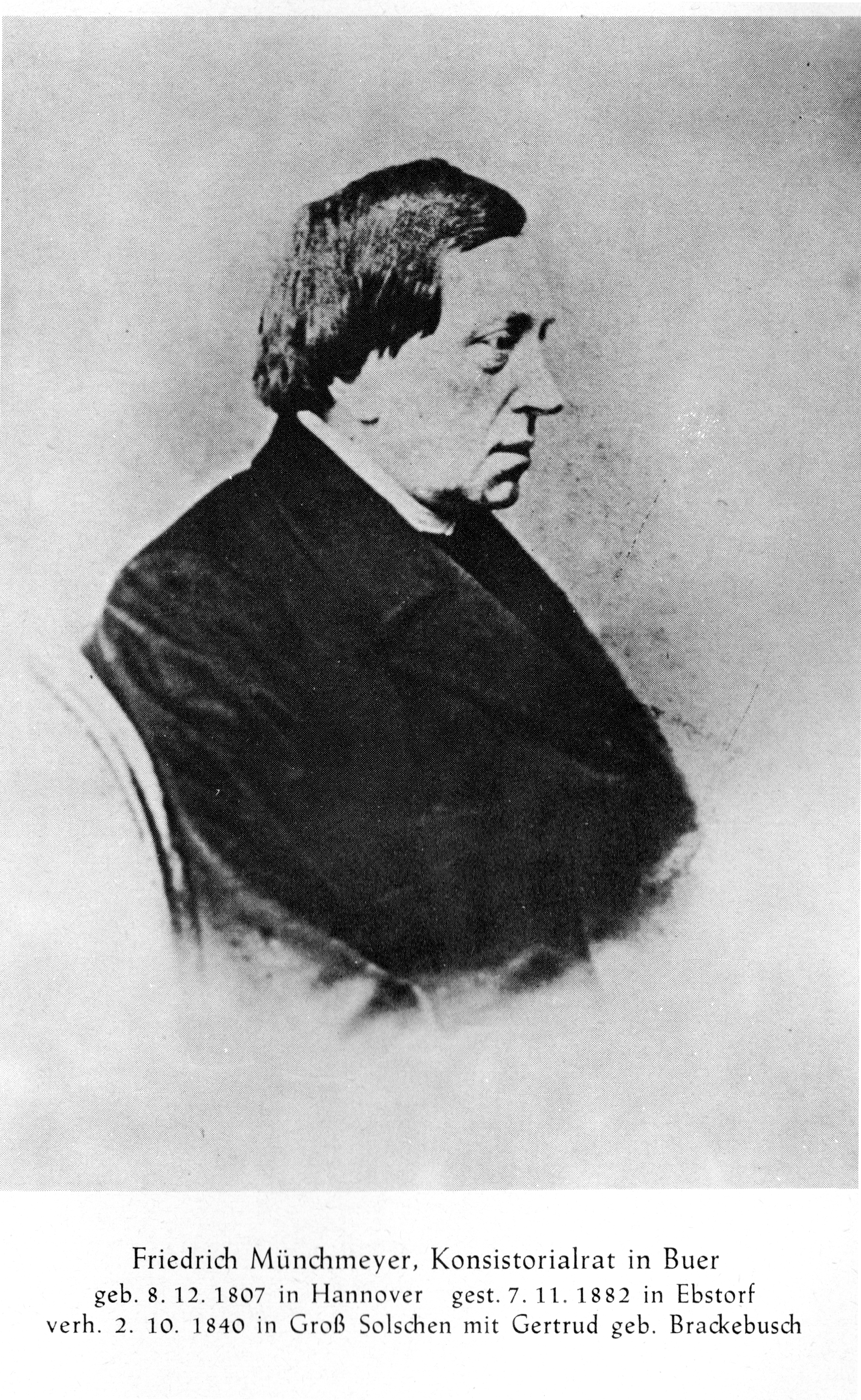
Friedrich Münchmeyer before 1880

August Friedrich Otto Münchmeyer was a German neo-Lutheran pastor. He was born in Hanover on 8 December 1807 and he died in Buer (10 miles north Essen), Münster on 7 November 1882.

He studied at Lüneburg, Holzminden, Göttingen, Berlin, and at the preachers' seminary in Hanover. In 1840 he was appointed pastor at Lamspringe, near Hildesheim; in 1851, superintendent at Catlenburg; and in 1855, consistorial councilor and superintendent at Buer, and member of the ecclesiastical court of Osnabrück.

He was a zealous advocate of the complete separation of State and Church, which he supported in the Zeitschrift für Protestantismus und Kirche, and in the Göttinger Monatsschrift (1846-1847). He engaged in a controversy with Höfling over the latter's Grundsätze evangelisch-lutherischer Kirchenverfassung, to refute which he published Das Amt des Neuen Testaments nach Lehre der Schrift und der lutherischen Bekenntnisse (Osterode, n.d.). He was also the author of Das Dogma von der sichtbaren und unsichtbaren Kirche (Göttingen, 1854).
