= Johann Gottfried Scheibel =

German theologian

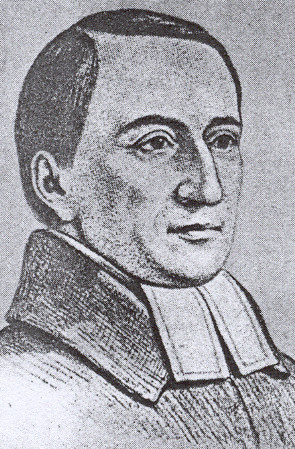
Johann Gottfried Scheibel.

Johann Gottfried Scheibel (16 September 1783 – 21 March 1843) was a German theologian and a leader of the Old Lutherans.

== Education and Ministry ==
Johann Scheibel was born in Breslau, Silesia, and studied at the University of Halle from 1801 to 1804. He went on from there to be the assistant minister at St Elisabeth's Church in Breslau from 1804 to 1815, then advancing to deacon. Between 1811 and 1830 he was a professor of theology, first on an extraordinary, since 1818 on an ordinary chair, at the Silesian Frederick William's University in Breslau until he was suspended from his post.

Scheibel came to prominence as a leader of the Old Lutherans in the dissent against the Prussian Union of churches. He became noted "in 1817 when he was the only theology professor to refuse to take part in the united Holy Communion service for the anniversary of the Reformation. Later when the new liturgy was first recommended and then obligatory, he totally rejected it." He spoke, preached and wrote against the Union, which consequently resulted in the suspension from his post as theological professor and deacon of St. Elisabeth's. He then collected fellow Lutherans from many congregations in Breslau, about 300 families, and founded a Lutheran congregation seceded from the Union church. 16 persons were elected as the new Collegial Body of Representatives (Repräsentantencollegium) governing the independent Lutheran church. The Prussian government considered these acts as illegal.

Undaunted, Scheibel continued in his dissent as he moved to new cities. In 1832 he emigrated from Prussia and found refuge in Lutheran Saxony. He was at Dresden in 1832 where he was ordered to leave that same year, indeed leaving in 1833. Then he stayed in Hermsdorf in the Ore Mountains until 1836 where likewise he was asked to leave, then in Glauchau, Saxony, and Nuremberg in Bavaria. He died at Nuremberg about the time that he was being restored to his post as professor at Breslau. Only two years after his death the separate Evangelical Lutheran Church in Prussia gained royal recognition and established its Supreme Church Collegial Body (Oberkirchenkollegium) in Breslau, formed after his initial Collegial Body of Representatives.
