= Friedrich Adolf Philippi =

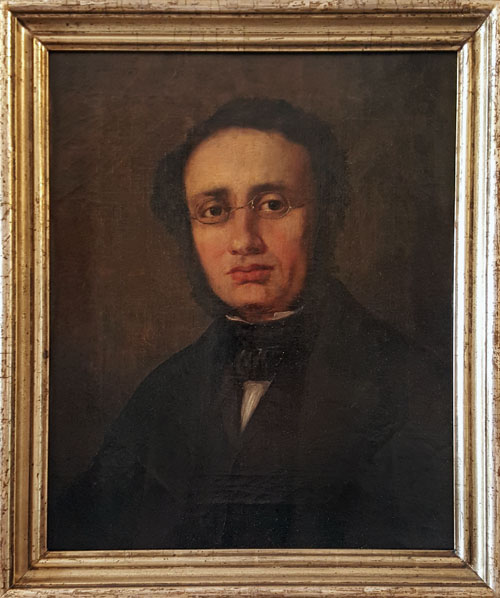
Friedrich Adolf Philippi

Friedrich Adolf Philippi (October 15, 1809 in Berlin – August 29, 1882 in Rostock) was a Lutheran theologian of Jewish origin.

He was the son of a wealthy Jewish banker, a friend of the Mendelssohn family.

Converted to Christianity in 1829, he studied philosophy and theology at Berlin and Leipzig (PhD 1831), and became successively a teacher at a private school in Dresden and at the Joachimsthalsche Gymnasium at Berlin (1833).

In 1837 he received his diploma as Lutheran minister, and in 1838 was admitted as privatdozent to the theological faculty of the Humboldt University of Berlin.

In 1841 he was elected professor of theology at the Imperial University of Dorpat; he received the degree of D.D. "honoris causa" from the Friedrich-Alexander-University, Erlangen-Nuremberg in 1843.

== Bibliography ==
- Die Lehre vom Thätigen Gehorsam Christi, Berlin, 1841
- Kirchliche Glaubenslehre, Berlin, 1859 (Volumes 3-4)
- Kirchliche Glaubenslehre, Berlin, 1879 (Volumes 6)
- Commentar über den Brief Pauli an die Römer, Frankfurt, 1856
- De Celsi, Adversarii Christianorum, Philosophandi Genere, Berlin, 1868
- Vorlesungen über Symbolik, Gütersloh, 1883
