= Philip Marheineke =

German Protestant church leader (1780-1846)

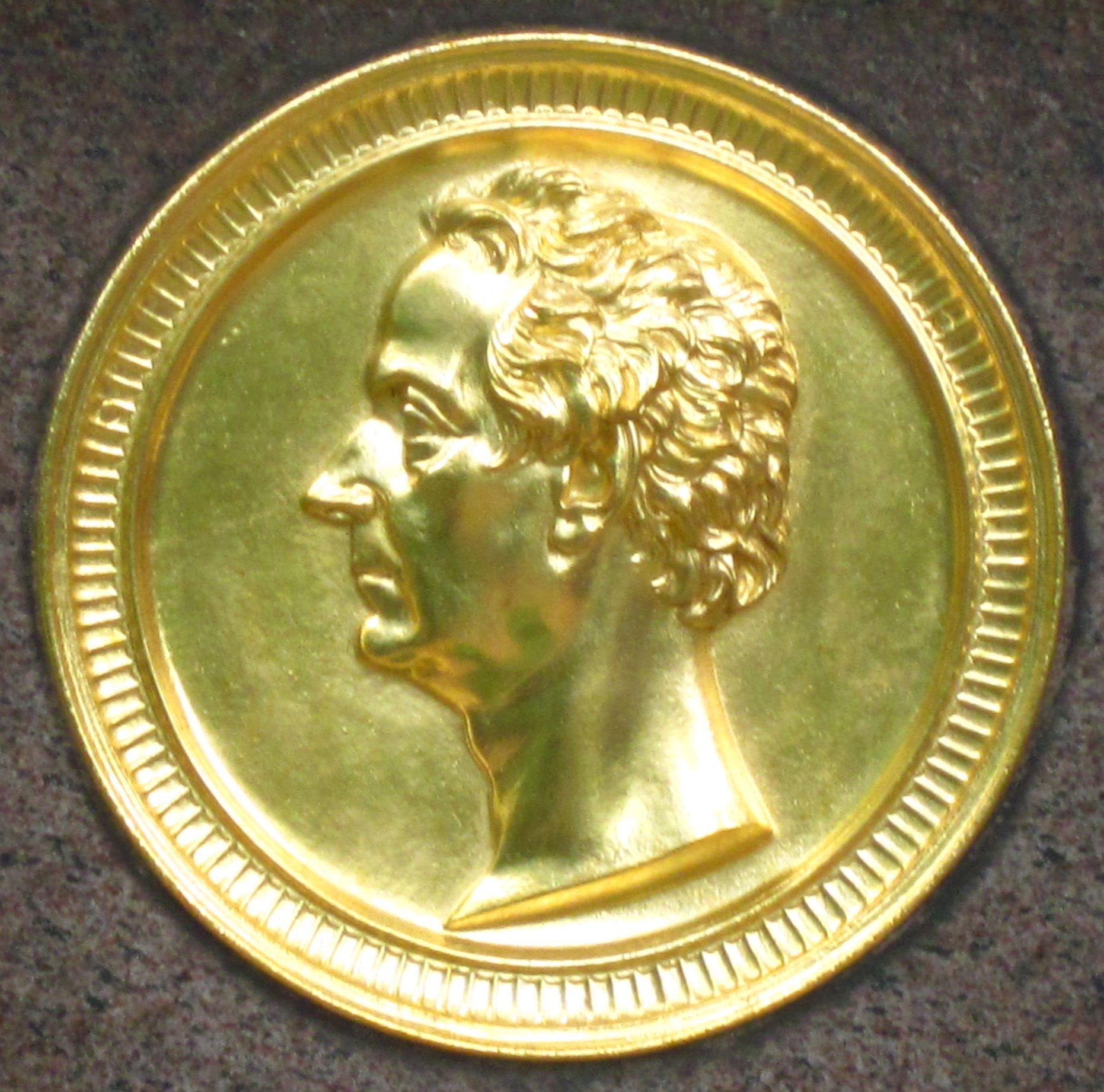
Portrait tondo from Marheineke's headstone in the Dreifaltigkeitsfriedhof II of Kreuzberg, Berlin

Philip Konrad Marheineke (German: [maʁˈhaɪnəkə]; May 1, 1780 – May 31, 1846) was a German Protestant theologian and church leader within the Evangelical Church in Prussia.

== Life ==
He was born in Hildesheim, in the Bishopric of Hildesheim, and studied at the University of Göttingen. In 1805, he was appointed professor extraordinarius of philosophy at Erlangen; in 1807, he moved to Heidelberg. In 1811 he became professor ordinarius at Frederick William University, Berlin, where from 1820 he was also preacher at Trinity Church and worked with Schleiermacher.

He died in Berlin in 1846. When he died, he was a member of the supreme consistorial council.

== Work ==
At first influenced by Friedrich Schelling, Marheineke found a new master in G. W. F. Hegel, and came to be regarded as the leader of the Hegelian Right. He sought to defend and explain all the orthodox doctrines of the Church in an orthodox way in the terms of Hegel's philosophy.

The Christliche Symbolik (1810–1814) has been pronounced his masterpiece.

He published the first edition of ‘’Die Grundlehren der christlichen Dogmatik als Wissenschaft’’ in 1819 when he influenced by Schelling. The second edition in 1827 showed a change of view. The third edition (1847) showed Marheineke's developed views on dogmatics.

His other works include Institutiones symbolicae (1812; 3rd ed. 1830), Geschichte der deutschen Reformation (1816; 2nd ed. 1831–1834); Die Reform der Kirche durch den Staat (1844), and the posthumous Theol. Vorlesungen (1847–1849).

He co-edited Hegel's posthumous Werke series (1832–1845) and an 1840 edition of Lectures on the Philosophy of Religion.

== Publications ==
- Gesch. d. christlichen Moral seit d. Anfange d. Reformation (1805)
- Universalkirchenhistorie (1806)
- Studien (Frankfort, 1805–11) (contributor)
- Chrisuiche Symbolik (3 vols., Heidelberg, 1810–14)
- Grundlegung der Homiletik (Hamburg, 1811)
- Predigten (1814–18)
- Geschichte der deutschen Reformation (2 vols., Berlin, 1817)
- Die Grundlehren der christlichen Dogmatik als Wissenschaft (1819)
- Vorlesungen caber die Philosophie der Religion (Berlin, 1832) (editor)
- Zeitschrift für spekulative Theologie (Berlin, 1836-38) (contributor)
- Philosophische and theologische Vorleaungen (7 vols., 1838–1841) (co-editor)
- Zur Kritik der Schellinyschen Ofenbarungs philosophie (Berl. 1843)
- Die Reform der Kirche durch den Staat (1844)
- System der theologischen Moral (Berlin, 1847)
- System der christlichen Dogmatik (Berlin, 1847)
- Theol. Vorlesungen (1847–1849)
