= Gottfried Thomasius =

German Lutheran theologian (1802-1875)

Gottfried Thomasius (/toʊˈmeɪʃəs/; 26 June 1802 – 24 January 1875) was a German Lutheran theologian. He was born in Egenhausen (in present-day Middle Franconia) and he died in Erlangen.

== Biography ==
He studied philosophy and theology in Erlangen, Halle and Berlin, and as a student had renowned instructors that included Friedrich Schleiermacher, August Neander, G. W. F. Hegel, Philip Marheineke and Friedrich Tholuck. In 1829 he began serving as a pastor in Nuremberg, and in 1842 was appointed professor of dogmatics at the University of Erlangen.

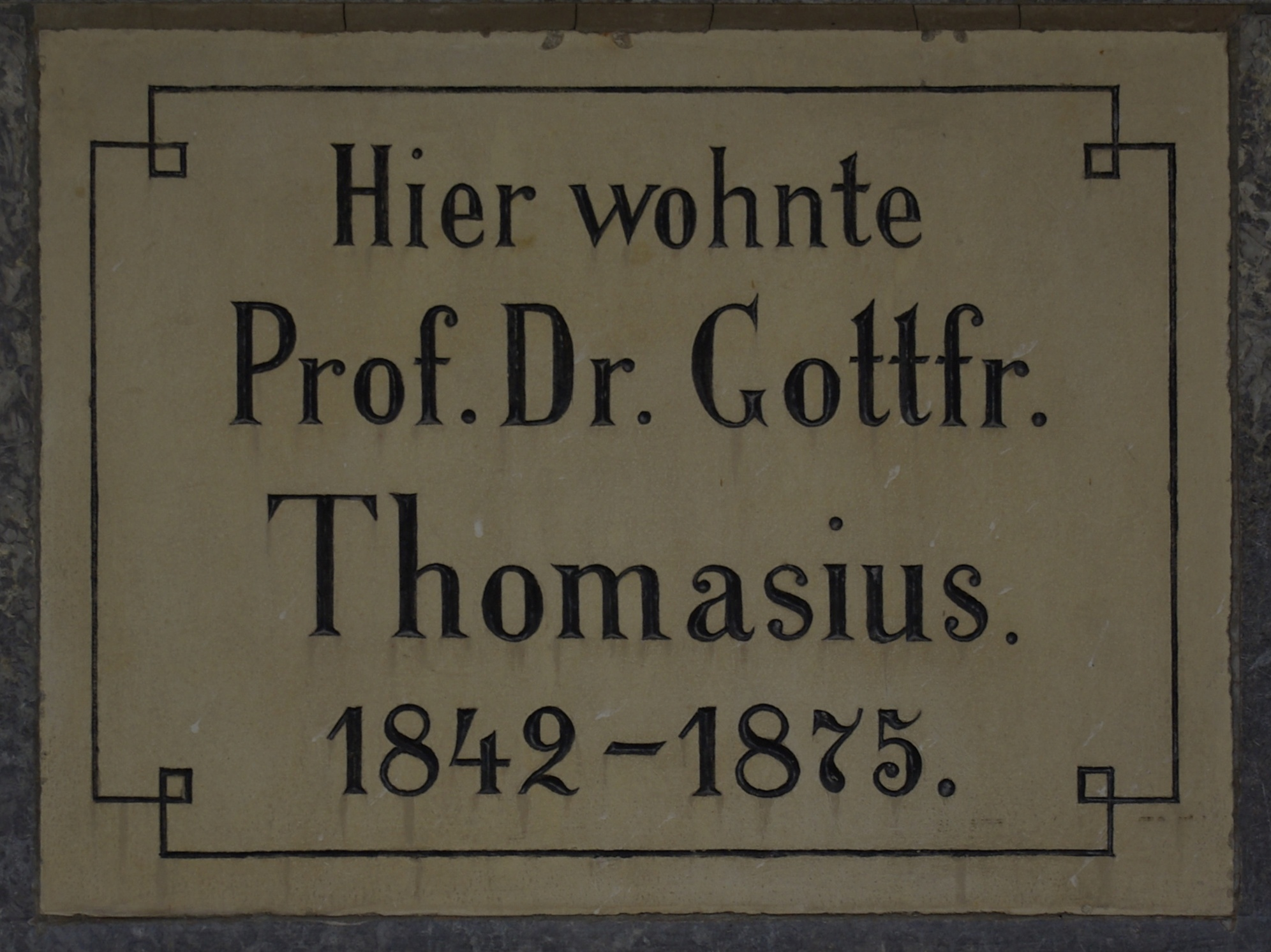
Commemorative plaque for Thomasius at Haus Halbmondstraße 2 in Erlangen

Thomasius was an important representative of the "Erlangen School" within the German Neo-Lutheranism movement and a major influence on, for instance, the church historian Albert Hauck. He is credited for introducing the concept of Kenotic Christology into German theology, of which, his aim was to provide an understanding of the limited consciousness of Jesus Christ, without denying the unity of deity and humanity in Christ.

== Works ==
- Origen. Ein Beitrag zur Dogmengeschichte des dritten Jahrhunderts (Origen, A contribution to dogmatic history of the third century), (1837).
- Beiträge zur kirchlichen Christologie, (Contributions to church-based Christology), (1845).
- Christi Person und Werk, (Christ's person and work), (1852-1861).
- Das Bekenntnis der lutherischen Kirche von der Versöhnung, (1857).
- Die christliche Dogmengeschichte, (History of Christian dogma), (1874-1876).
