= Gottlieb Christoph Adolf von Harless =

German Lutheran theologian

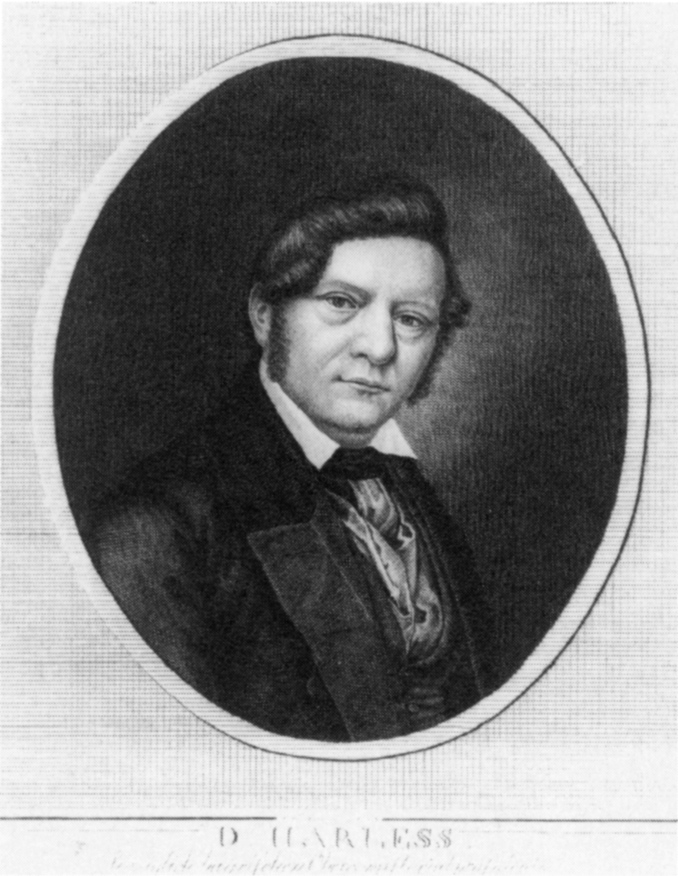
Gottlieb Christoph Adolf von Harless

Gottlieb Christoph Adolf von Harless (German: von Harleß; 21 November 1806 – 5 September 1879) was a German Lutheran theologian.

== Life ==
He was born on 21 November 1806 in Nuremberg. As a youth, he was interested in music and poetry, and was attracted by ancient and German classical literature, especially by Jean Paul. He was indifferent to Christianity. In 1823 he entered the University of Erlangen, at first studying philology, then law; but he finally tried theology. The teacher who particularly influenced him was Georg Benedikt Winer.

Harless wanted to understand the reasons for the importance of the Christian religion in the life of the people and the history of the world. He first thought that the philosophy of Georg Wilhelm Friedrich Hegel was adapted to the solution of this problem. Later he was led to the philosophy of Baruch Spinoza, in whose system he searched for the roots of Hegel's and Friedrich Wilhelm Joseph Schelling's philosophy. He moved, in 1826, to the University of Halle, attracted by Friedrich Tholuck. He conceived a plan of studying the literature of the ancient philosophers and theologians. Harless received a further impulse from his study of Blaise Pascal's Pensées, but at about this time he had a crisis of conscience; he turned to the confessional writings of the Lutheran Church and found their contents in conformity with the experience of his faith. The chief attraction in the Lutheran confession was, for him, the doctrine of justification, which would become the central point of his theology.

In 1828 Harless returned from Halle to Erlangen as privat-docent in theology, and three years later became professor of New Testament exegesis. The theological faculty at Erlangen owed its later conservative tendency chiefly to Harless. In 1836 he became ordinary professor, and as such lectured also on Christian ethics, theological encyclopedia, and methodology. In 1836 he became preacher of the university. He declined calls to Rostock, Berlin, Dorpat, and Zurich. In 1840 he was appointed delegate of the chamber of states in Munich to defend the rights of the Lutheran Church against the measures of the ministry. Harless won popularity by defending the interests of his church but the opposition party succeeded in removing him in 1845 to Baireuth, as second councilor of the consistory. In the same year, however, he was appointed professor of theology in Leipzig, where he lectured for the first time on dogmatics. Within two years he was appointed preacher at St. Nicolai, in addition to his duties as professor.

In 1850 he moved to Dresden as court preacher, reporting councillor in the ministry of public instruction, and vice-president of the state consistory, but two years later was called by King Maximilian II of Bavaria to return to his native state as president of the supreme consistory. Here Wilhelm Löhe and his adherents opposed the existing condition of the State Church, and insisted on an entire change, or, if this should be impossible, on separation. The influence of Harless, a friend of Löhe from former days, persuaded him not to separate himself from the State Church.

A new hymn-book in the spirit of orthodox Lutheranism was soon introduced. The introduction of a new order of church service was more difficult. Here the question of private confession, which was confused with auricular confession, led to opposition, but the organization of the State Church, firmly established under Harless, finally achieved a victory.

Harless now became the acknowledged leader of the whole Lutheran Church. He presided for a long time over the missionary board at Leipzig. During his latter years he was almost blind from cataracts. He died at Munich on 5 September 1879.

== Works ==
His three most important works were written while professor at Erlangen, as his later public activity left him little time for literary work. They are:

- Commentar über den Brief Pauli an die Ephesier (Erlangen, 1834);
- Theologische Encyclopädie und Methodologie vom Standpunkte der Protestantischen Kirche (Nuremberg,-1837);
- Christliche Etik (Stuttgart, 1842; Eng. transl., Edinburgh, 1868).

The commentary and the work on ethics marked an epoch in their respective spheres. The encyclopedia is less important for its methodological arrangement than for Harless' clear and energetic views of the Church, the main points being the close relation of theology to the Church; the unity of theory and practise in a common living faith; the living continuity of the Church from her very foundation as an ideal factor of history, the emphasis of a common faith as the basis of Protestant theology; the entire transformation of this theology by the principle of justification; the necessity of preserving the principles of the Reformation in their purity; the obscurity caused by the later Protestant scholasticism, which considered the dogmas laid down in the confessional writings of the Church as the final conclusion of all dogmatic knowledge; and the sound reaction against this tendency by the Pietistic movement.

The Christliche Etik (Eng. transl., System of Christian Ethics, Edinburgh, 1868) is without doubt Harless' most important work. Its chief excellence are its scientific structure, the emphasis and consistent application of the Christian ethical principle, and the interrelation and connection of the Biblical factor with the historical factor in the more general sense of the word.

He died on 5 September 1879, having, a few years earlier, written an autobiography under the title Bruchstücke aus dem Leben eines süddeutschen Theologen.
