= German settlement in Australia =

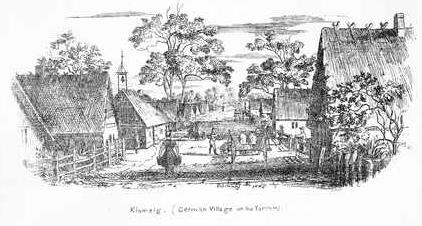
"Klemzig – German Village on the Torrens"

German settlement in Australia began in large numbers in 1838, with the arrival of immigrants from Prussia to Adelaide, in the then colony of South Australia. German immigrants became prominent in settling South Australia and Queensland. From 1850 until World War I, German settlers and their descendants comprised the largest non-British or Irish group of Europeans in Australia.

== Kinnear winegrowers – April 1838 ==
On 23 April 1838, the barque Kinnear arrived at Sydney carrying six German wine growing families. Johann Justus, Friedrich Seckold, Johann Stein, Caspar Flick, Georg Gerhard and Johann Wenz, were the first German vinedressers in Australia. Hundreds of Germans followed their arrival in Australia. They worked in the vineyards belonging to John Macarthur's son William Macarthur in what is now Camden Park. These six families were recruited from the Rheingau region of Hesse by Major Edward Macarthur.

== Teichelmann and Schürmann – October 1838 ==
Two Lutheran missionaries whose work later proved significant in the preservation of Aboriginal Australian languages such as Bangarla and Kaurna, Clamor Wilhelm Schürmann and Christian Gottlieb Teichelmann, arrived in Adelaide on the Pestonjee Bomanjee on 12 October 1838. Schürmann founded a mission at Encounter Bay and was also involved with missions in the Port Lincoln area, and the pair founded a school for Kaurna people at Piltawodli in the Adelaide parklands. Teichelmann married the Scottish Margaret Nicholson in 1843, and they went on to have 14 children and settled on a farm at Morphett Vale. Schürmann married the German Lutheran Wilhelmine Charlotte Maschmedt, also from Osnabrück, in 1847, and moved to Victoria in 1853. They had nine children.

== The Prince George and Bengalee group – November 1838 ==
The second group arrived with Pastor Kavel on the ships Prince George, and Bengalee from the Prussian Province of Brandenburg. The group was composed of Lutheran immigrants who had left their homeland escaping what they considered to be religious persecution at the hands of Prussian King Frederick William III, mainly because of their rejection of Prussian state enforcement of a new prayer book for church services. They settled at Klemzig, 6 km (3.7 mi) from Adelaide, named after their home town in the Prussian province of Brandenburg.

== The Zebra Group – December 1838 ==
The next group arrived on 28 December 1838, on the Zebra with Captain Dirk Meinerts Hahn. Captain Hahn, assisted this group in acquiring land in the Adelaide Hills, where they settled Hahndorf.

== The Catharina Group – January 1839 ==
The last of the initial wave of immigrants arrived in January 1839, on the Catharina. This group settled predominantly at Glen Osmond.

== The GH Wappaus Group - March 1839 ==
Sixty-three German passengers from Silesia, Prussia arrived March 31 on the GH Wappaus. Dr. Asscheanfeldt, surgeon-superintendent and among whom are two Roman Catholic missionaries. The Wappaus had sailed from Hamburg.

== The Skjold Group – October 1841 ==
In 1840 a letter was sent to the Old Lutherans in Prussia to encourage others to also emigrate. Included in this letter was a request for a second pastor to be sent also. The group set sail for Australia, on 11 July 1841 on the Skjold. On a trip beset with sickness, 55 people, mainly young children and the elderly, died. On 28 October 1841, 213 emigrants from Prussia arrived at Port Misery in South Australia. With them was Pastor Gotthard Fritzsche, who had been encouraged to emigrate because of the Prussian government's requirement for a Pastor to accompany the emigrants. The migrants settled at Lobethal, and Bethenien.

In 1842, Langmeil was settled.

== Hermann von Beckerath Group – 1847 ==
Early German immigrants were instrumental in the creation of the South Australian wine industry. One of the earliest wine makers, whose descendants still produce wine, was Carl August Sobels. Born in Dresden in 1802, he arrived in South Australia on the Hermann von Beckerath in 1847. At first he farmed at Macclesfield before moving to Tanunda where he produced table wines. After his death in 1863 the business was conducted by his son Ferdinand.

By the mid-1840s, the German community in South Australia had become large enough to warrant its own German-language newspaper. The first German language newspaper in Australia, Die Deutsche Post, was founded in Adelaide c. 6 January 1848.

== San Francisco Group – October 1850 ==
The barque San Francisco (a three masted barque of 450 tons (nm) built in Bjornberg, Sweden in 1846 and owned by J C Godeffroy & Sons) landed a number of emigrants in South Australia on 14 October 1850 on 15 June 1850 after leaving Hamburg. The ship almost never arrived, as it sailed straight into a major storm at Port Misery (Port Adelaide), which also wrecked the barque Grecian (three-masted, built at Sunderland, England in 1841) earlier that day. It was reported in a local newspaper of the time that the newly arrived emigrants on the ship were from the linen-producing Prussian province of Silesia. Like previous German emigrants to South Australia, the passengers then dispersed throughout the colony.

== Herrnhut – 1852 ==
Herrnhut was established as an intentional community based on the principles of shared property and fervent prayer, in 1852 in western Victoria (about 3 miles (4.8 km) north-west from Penshurst). It was founded by former Grovedale (then-known as Germantown) residents and led by Moravian preacher, Johann Krummnow (1811–1880). Krummnow had arrived in Adelaide via Catharina in 1839 and subsequently became a naturalised British citizen, he relocated to Lobethal, South Australia and later Germantown, Victoria. He used the residents' funds to purchase land and erect buildings with deeds in his name. Herrnhut once numbered about 40 but had dissipated by 1889.

== See also ==
- German Australians
- Forty-Eighters
- Barossa German
- German settlements in the Riverina
- Ethnic Germans
- Immigration to Australia
- German Baptist settlers in Australia
- Australian place names changed from German names
- Zion Hill Mission
