= St Michael's Lutheran Church, Hahndorf =

Lutheran church in Hahndorf, South Australia

Coordinates: 35°01′39″S 138°48′42″E

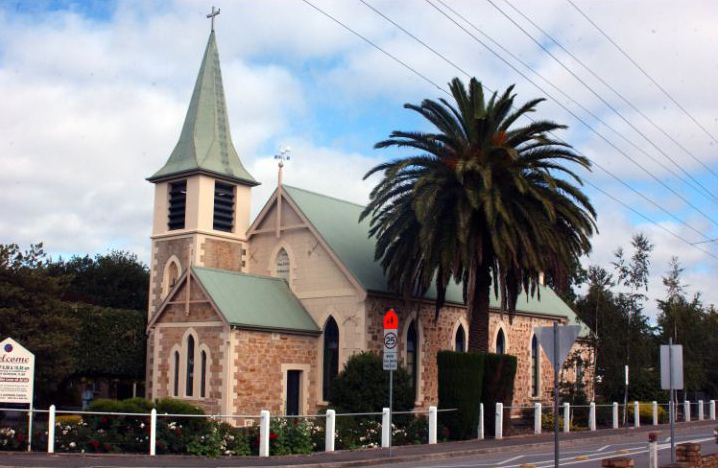
St Michael's Lutheran Church in 2013

St Michael's Lutheran Church is an historic church, built in 1857 in Hahndorf, South Australia, and continued to serve its congregation into the 21st-century.

== History ==
In 1838, following offers by George Fife Angas, a contingent of Lutherans from Prussia were led by pastor Augustus Kavel to South Australia in four ships, leaving the country rather than accept King Frederick's reforms to the Lutheran Church. Passsengers on the first ship, Prince George, included Kavel and his wife, and Angas's confidential clerk Charles Flaxman, a fluent German speaker, who acted as guide and interpreter. (Note: Fourteen passengers on the first two ships died on the voyage, and eight on the Zebra.) Passengers on the fourth ship, Catharina briefly settled at Glen Osmond. Passengers from the first two ships initially settled in Klemzig, named for Kavel's old pastorate and to a lesser extent Glen Osmond, but eventually joined passengers of a fifth ship Skjold and their pastor Gotthard Daniel Fritzsche, founding the village of Lobethal in 1842.

The third ship was Zebra, whose captain was Dirk Meinerts Hahn. Its passengers, between 200 and 250 in number, settled on 150 acres (61 ha) chosen by Hahn from the 4,000 acres (1,600 ha) selected by F. H. Dutton, MacFarlane and Moore (Note: By 1840 that property had changed hands, as on 18 May 1840 the settlers additionally purchased sections 4002, 4003 and 4004 from W. H. Dutton, Duncan MacFarlane and J. Finnis) from the Mount Barker special survey of 15,000 acres (6,100 ha). Hahn acted for the Zebra passengers, and the agreement he reached with Dutton gained for them 150 acres rent free for one year, of which 38 acres was to be reserved for building allotments, and provisions given to them for one year: six cows and a quantity of fowls, ducks, geese and pigs. At the end of the year each family was to take, at fair rent, as much land as they could manage. Dutton and MacFarlane would provide materials for them to build a church, and £30 or £40 towards a year's salary for the pastor. They named the settlement Hahndorf in recognition of the lengths the captain went to on their behalf. A schoolroom was built on the main street and classes were conducted by (Johann Wilhelm) Ferdinand "Fitz" Kavel (died 1850), the pastor's brother.

Kavel served as pastor of the Hahndorf congregation, also of Klemzig, where he lived, for about seven years, staying in Hahndorf for two weeks out of six. Pastor Gotthard Daniel Fritzsche arrived in 1841 in a fourth ship, some of whose passengers settled in Hahndorf and others at Bethany. (Note: Pastor Alfred Ernest Richard Brauer (1866–1949) later counted the Hahndorf pioneers as: 38 families from the Zebra and 14 from the earlier ships Prince George and Bengalee.) Fritzsche lived in Hahndorf until 1842, when he moved to Lobethal, along with most of the Skjold passengers.

The settlers, as pious Lutherans, held services under a large gum tree or, in less clement weather, in a shepherd's hut, then in 1840 completed a chapel built of pug-and-pine with a thatched roof. A rift developed between followers of Kavel and those of Fritzsche, which developed into a tussle for ownership of the chapel

Kavel retired in 1846, and for some years Fritzsche was required to take services in both villages, by necessity hiking from Lobethal to Hahndorf, a distance of some 12 miles (20 km). He was generally accompanied by students, to whom he would give instruction as they walked. One of these, Carl Frederich Adolph Strempel, became pastor in 1855. It was while he had charge of the church that it was resolved to erect a more substantial building, and a foundation stone was laid on 29 September 1858, the Feast of St Michael hence the name of the church, which was dedicated on 3 July 1859 and consecrated in October 1859. St Michael's church, which still stands, had cost £1200.

=== Dispute over control of church land ===
The split in the church created a practical hurdle to overcome, which was taken to the High Court of South Australia to resolve: In May 1839 a synod was held at Glen Osmond, with all South Australian Lutherans represented, to hammer out a charter of rights and responsibilities of the individual churches. It was resolved, amongst other issues, that church land and buildings would be vested in the synod.

==== The court case ====
In 1840 Christian Jaensch and J. C. E. Jaensch, (the defendants) together with others, purchased lots 4002, 4003, and 4004 of the Mount Barker special survey, from which certain lands were reserved for streets and church property, the latter being held in trust by the defendants under a deed executed in May 1850. The remainder of the land and expenses were divided equitably among the settlers: J. F. Thiele, J. C. Thiele, F. W. Witwer (the plaintiffs) and 49 other persons, including the defendants, as heads of families. In the intervening years, 43 had either died or dispersed, leaving only 11 of the original purchasers, of which nine preferred the plaintiffs to be appointed trustees of the church property, and requested the Court to resolve the matter.

In later years Hahndorf would be known briefly as Ambleside, Klemzig as Gaza and Lobethal as Tweedvale (1917–1935).

== Pastors ==
- 1839–1846 August Ludwig Christian Kavel (1798–1860)
- 1846–1855 Gotthard Daniel Fritzsche (1796–1863)
- 1855–1901 Carl Frederich Adolph Strempel (1832–1908)
- 1902–1921 Alfred Ernest Richard Brauer (1866–1949), an historian of the Lutheran Church
- 1922–1926 Johannes Peter Albrecht Homann (14 September 1875 – 28 August 1929)
- 1927–1943 Frederick John Henry Blaess (died 1969) lived in the area from about 1880
- 1943–1961 Theodor Christoph Backen
- 1961–1971 Elmore Norman Zweck
- 1971–1994 Gordon Wilfred Mibus
- 2002–2017 Stephen Paul Schultz
- 2013–2015 Dean J. Mills
- 2016– Michael Desmond Dutschke
