= August Kavel =

Australian Lutheranist

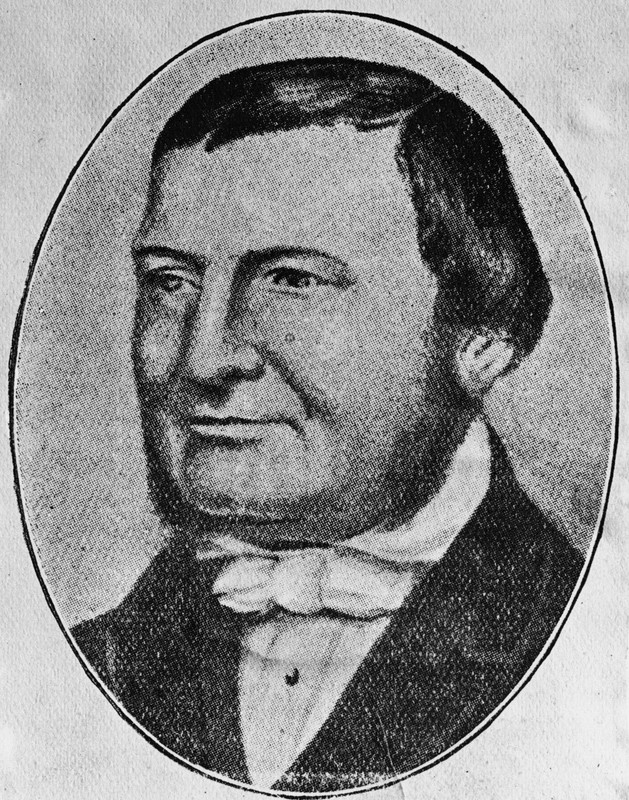
August Kavel c. 1840

August Ludwig Christian Kavel (3 September 1798 – 12 February 1860) was a founder of Lutheranism in Australia.

== Training and early ministry ==
Kavel was born in Berlin, where he attended the Gymnasium zum Grauen Kloster school and went on to study theology. In 1826, he was ordained and installed as the pastor at the church in the village of Klemzig, located near the city of Züllichau (Sulechów) in what as then the German state of Prussia and is now Klępsk, Poland. Between 1798 and 1840, the Protestant churches in Prussia had been subjected to a number of changes, brought about by the decrees of King Frederick William III. These decrees were intended to unify the Lutheran and Reformed Churches into one Evangelical Christian Church. By 1826, there was some opposition to the intentions of Frederick William. This escalated in 1830, when Frederick William announced a number of changes that outlawed the traditional rites of the churches and prescribed a form of worship which many Lutherans believed was against the Will of God. It was in this environment that dissent against the decrees of Frederick William arose.

Pastor Kavel was not initially one of this group, who had come to be known as the Old Lutherans. Frederick William's revised edition of the worship agenda, which was released in 1829, was voluntary for usage in congregations, as was the first edition. Pastor Kavel used this worship order until 1834 when, under the influence of the writings of Johann Gottfried Scheibel, he ceased and joined the ranks of the dissenters. Kavel wrote to the King in January 1835, informing him that he would no longer use the worship agenda. On Easter Monday 1835, Kavel was removed from the ministry and was prohibited from practising as a pastor. His congregation likewise were prohibited from using the church premises, and participating in any worship services presided by suspended Pastors.

== Emigration to Australia ==
Pastor Kavel began to look for avenues to lead his congregation in an exodus from Prussia to a place where they could worship in freedom. In early 1836, Kavel travelled to Hamburg to enquire into the possibility of migrating to Russia or the United States; however, both of these options were not possible.

While in Hamburg, Kavel was informed of the possibility of migrating to Australia. He travelled to London, England, to meet with George Fife Angas, the chairman of the South Australia Company, which was searching for emigrants to settle the land acquisitions it had in South Australia. Kavel was received favourably by Angas, who sent his chief clerk, Charles Flaxman, to Prussia to meet with Kavel's group and to prepare them for emigration. Kavel remained in London, ministering to the German community.

The congregation in Klemzig went through a number of setbacks in their application to emigrate. Requiring permission from the government, they were informed that their request for emigration had been denied in 1837. Representatives who were sent to appeal against the denial were arrested and imprisoned. It was only at the end of 1837 that the group was finally given permission to emigrate.

Financially, the migration was expensive. Angas had lobbied the South Australia Company to provide funding for the Lutheran dissenters, arguing that the character of the people was the ideal type for the new settlement in South Australia. However, due to financial problems within the company, the request by Angas, which had initially been approved, was now denied. Many of the Prussian migrants had also encountered financial hardship due to the extended emigration application process. A migration to Australia now appeared to be impossible.

George Angas decided to personally provide funding to Kavel and the Klemzig group. Four ships were chartered on their behalf: Prince George, Bengalee, Zebra and Catharina. Prince George and Bengalee left Hamburg on 8 July 1838 with about 250 of the emigrants. They travelled to Plymouth, where they picked up Kavel, and then continued on their journey until they arrived in Port Adelaide on 20 November 1838. Zebra left in August 1838 with 187 on board and arrived in Holdfast Bay on 28 December. Eleven people, six adults and five children, died on the trip. Catharina left in September 1838 and arrived in January 1839. In all, this group of ships transported 596 migrants from Prussia to Australia.

== Settlement in South Australia ==
Kavel, as the leader of the group of immigrants, acted as a negotiator for securing land for the settlers. These new migrants rented 61 hectares (150 acres) from George Angas and established their first settlement in Australia at Klemzig. On the arrival of the third ship, Zebra, the town Hahndorf was established. A third settlement of the Prussian migrants was established at Glen Osmond by many of the passengers from Catharina. One of Kavel's followers, Johann Friedrich Krummnow, taught the girls en route but was deemed "not completely satisfactory and the community did not allow him to teach in Australia".

On 23 and 24 May 1839, Kavel convened a meeting of the elders of the three villages. At this meeting, the constitution of the new Australian Lutheran synod was adopted. At the following synodical gathering in 1840, a letter was drafted and subsequently sent to the "Old Lutherans" in Prussia. Its purpose was to encourage others to emigrate and, most importantly, have a second pastor immigrate to Australia. On 28 October 1841, 224 further Prussian immigrants arrived in Adelaide on Skjold, among them Pastor Gotthard Fritzsche. This group formed the main part of the settlements at Lobethal and Bethanien. Krummnow, who was now a naturalised English citizen and therefore able to purchase land, was provided by the settlers at Lobethal with funds to establish a community; Krummnow wanted this community to be based on his own principles of shared property and fervent prayer. The Lobethal settlers rejected Krummnow's vision and legally disputed his right to the land titles. In 1842, Langmeil was settled. Kavel remained in South Australia until his death.

== Division in the Church ==
Tension arose between Kavel and the settled migrants at Hahndorf and Klemzig when he strongly urged them to relocate to Langmeil.

== Family ==
Kavel's parents, Albrecht Christian Kavel (c. 1766 – August 1842) and (Charlotte) Sabine Kavel, née Fillgraf, (25 December 1767 – 1852) also emigrated aboard Prince George in 1838.

- August Kavel married Anne Catherine Pennyfeather, an English woman, on 28 March 1840. She died on 25 December 1841 after giving birth to a stillborn son and was buried in the tiny Klemzig cemetery (Kavel's parents would also be buried there). Kavel married again on 26 May 1851, to Johanna Beata Irrgang; they had no offspring.
- His sister Maria Charlotte Sabine Kavel (2 August 1806 – 6 April 1880) emigrated aboard Prince George in 1838 and married (Johann Friedrich) August Fiedler (21 February 1796 – 17 September 1880).
- Three brothers Johann Wilhelm Ferdinand Kavel (died 1850), Ferdinand "Fitz", was a teacher at Hahndorf; Johann Friedrich Wilhelm Kavel, and Daniel Samuel Kavel also emigrated on the same voyage.

== Literature (in English and German) ==
- Theodor Hebart: Die Vereinigte Evangelisch-Lutherische Kirche in Australien ... 1838–1938. Lutheran Book Depot, Adelaide 1938. – Detailed description of the early years of the Lutheran Church in Australia, including an illustration and explanation of the theological conflicts between Kavel and Fritsche.
- Wilhelm Iwan: Um des Glaubens willen nach Australien: Eine Episode deutscher Auswanderung. Luth. Bücherverein, Breslau 1931. – General description of the Lutheran’s migration from Klemzig to South Australia and August Kavel's role in the event.
- David Schubert: Kavel’s People: Their Story of migration from Prussia to South Australia ... Second edition, with corrections. Highgate (SA), [self published] 1997. – Detailed documentation of Kavel's motives for the migration, including facsimiles and/or extensive quotations from relevant documents.
- Chris Illert: Traditional German Folkstories from the Barossa Valley / Traditionelle deutsche Volksmärchen vom Barossatal. East Corrimal (NSW), [self published] 1988. – August Kavel and his opponent Fritzsche depicted as sorcerers in a small collection of Folkstories, reflecting the migration, the foundation of the new church in Australia and the upcoming theological conflicts.
- Jakob Anderhandt: ”Deutschaustralische Märchen von der Freiheit des Glaubens“. Eremitage: Zeitschrift für Literatur, No. 14, Ludwigsburg: Valentin Verlag, 2007, pp 9–37. – Essay comparing and analysing the relations between the folkstories collected by Chris Illert and the real events, including Kavel’s achievements in Germany, England and Australia.

== General references ==
- "The Confessional Lutheran Emigrations From Prussia And Saxony Around 1839", Westerhaus, Martin O.
- "Captain Dirk Hahn and the "Hahndorf" passengers to South Australia", German Australia, David Nutting
- "Records from the following Lutheran Churches", Lutheran Church of Australia Archives
