= Skjold =

Skjold may refer to:

== Places ==
- Skjold, Bergen, a neighborhood in Bergen municipality in Vestland county, Norway
- Skjold, Rogaland, a village in Vindafjord municipality in Rogaland county, Norway
- Skjold Municipality, a former municipality in Rogaland county, Norway
- Skjold, Troms, a village in Målselv municipality in Troms county, Norway
- Skjold (garrison), a Norwegian army garrison in Målselv municipality in Troms county, Norway

== Other uses ==
- HDMS Skjold, ships of the Royal Danish Navy
- Skjold-class corvette, a Norwegian class of patrol boats
- Skjold (1839 ship), a Danish three mast barque built in 1839
- Skjöld or Skjöldr, a king in Norse mythology
- Boldklubben Skjold, a Danish football team
- Skjold oil field, an oil field in the Danish sector of the North Sea

== See also ==
- Skjold Church (disambiguation)
- Skjoldungen, an island in Greenland
