= George Fife Angas =

Australian politician

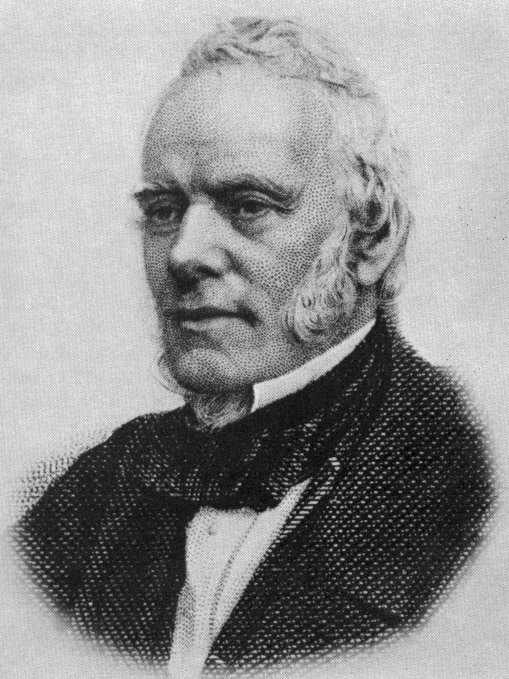

Member of the South Australian Legislative Council
- In office 8 July 1851 – 28 August 1866
- Constituency: Barossa (1851–1857); The Province (1857–1866)

Chairman of the South Australia Company
- In office 9 October 1835 – April 1848
- Preceded by: office established
- Succeeded by: J. Russell Todd

Personal details
- Born: 1 May 1789 Newcastle upon Tyne, England
- Died: 15 May 1879 (aged 90) Angaston, South Australia
- Spouse: Rosetta French
- Children: Sarah Lindsay Angas; George French Angas; John Howard Angas
- Occupation: Coachbuilder, banker, politician

George Fife Angas (1 May 1789 – 15 May 1879) was an English businessman and banker who, while residing in England, played a significant part in the formation and establishment of the Province of South Australia. He established the South Australian Company and was its founding chairman of the board of directors.

In later life he migrated to the colony and served as a member of the first South Australian Legislative Council. His financial contribution of some £40,000 was instrumental to the creation of South Australia.

== Early life ==
Angas was born at Newcastle upon Tyne, England, fifth son of coachbuilder and ship owner Caleb Angas of Newcastle (1743–1831) and his second wife Sarah Angas née Lindsay (1749–1802). After his mother's death, Angas continued his education at a boarding school and at age 15, became an apprentice coachbuilder under his father's direction. He started the Benevolent Society of Coachbuilders in Newcastle in 1807 "to provide for sick members and others requiring relief, and promote habits of economy and temperance". In 1808, he went to London to gain further experience and returned to Newcastle in 1809 where he worked as a supervisor for his father's business.

On 8 April 1812, in Hutton, Essex, he married Rosetta French (1793–1867), daughter of John French (1761–1829), "Gentleman of Hutton, Essex", and Rosetta French née Rayner (1756–1836). They had three sons and four daughters.

- Rosetta French Angas (1813–1898)
- Sarah Lindsay Angas (1816–1898), Australian temperance worker
- Emma Angas (1818–1885), caught smallpox and died while nursing refugees in Beirut
- George French Angas (1822–1886), artist
- John Howard Angas (1823–1904), Australian pioneer, politician and philanthropist
- Mary Ann Angas (1826–1831)
- William Henry Angas (1832–1870)

== Career ==
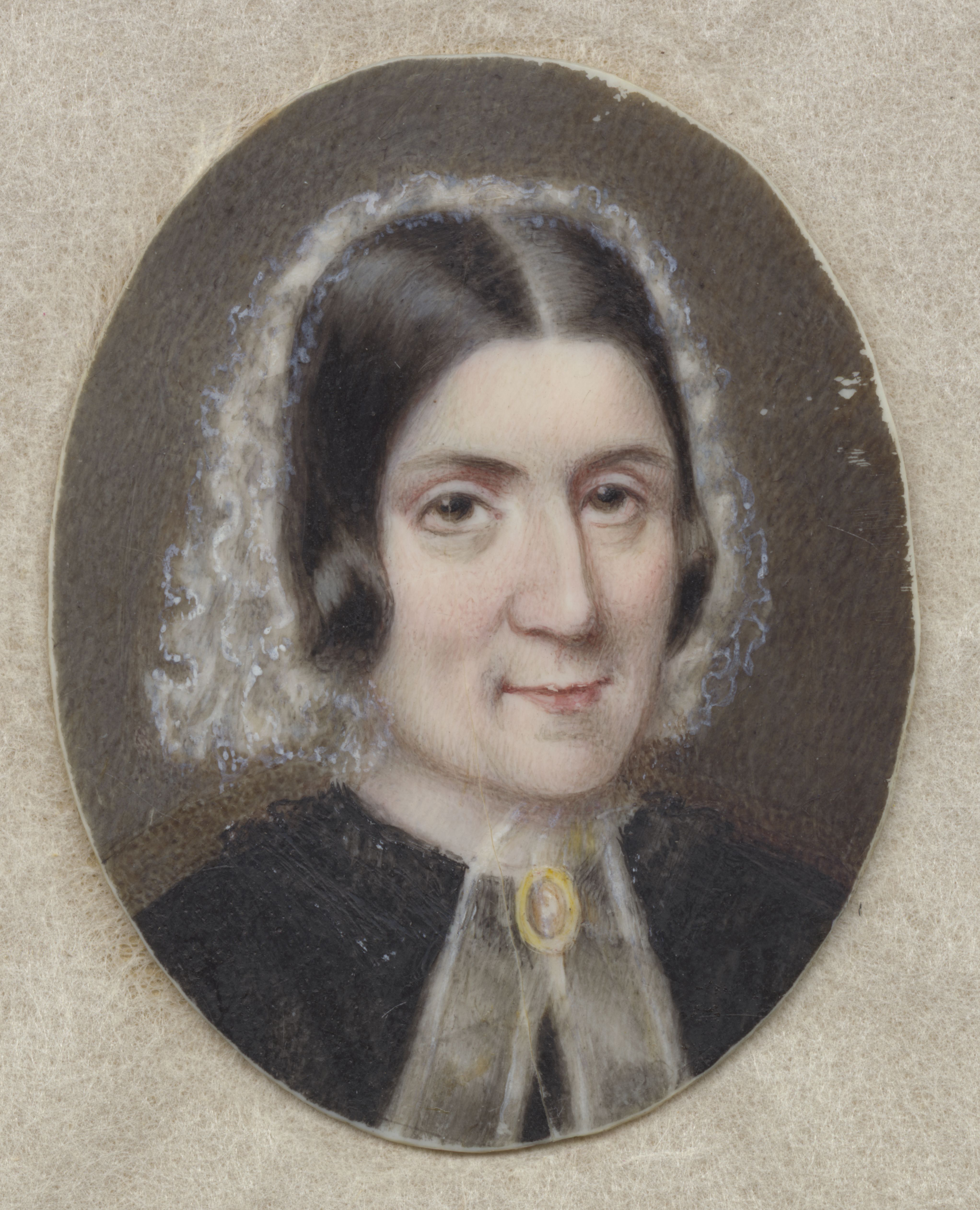
Rosetta Angas, wife of George Fife Angas, about 1840

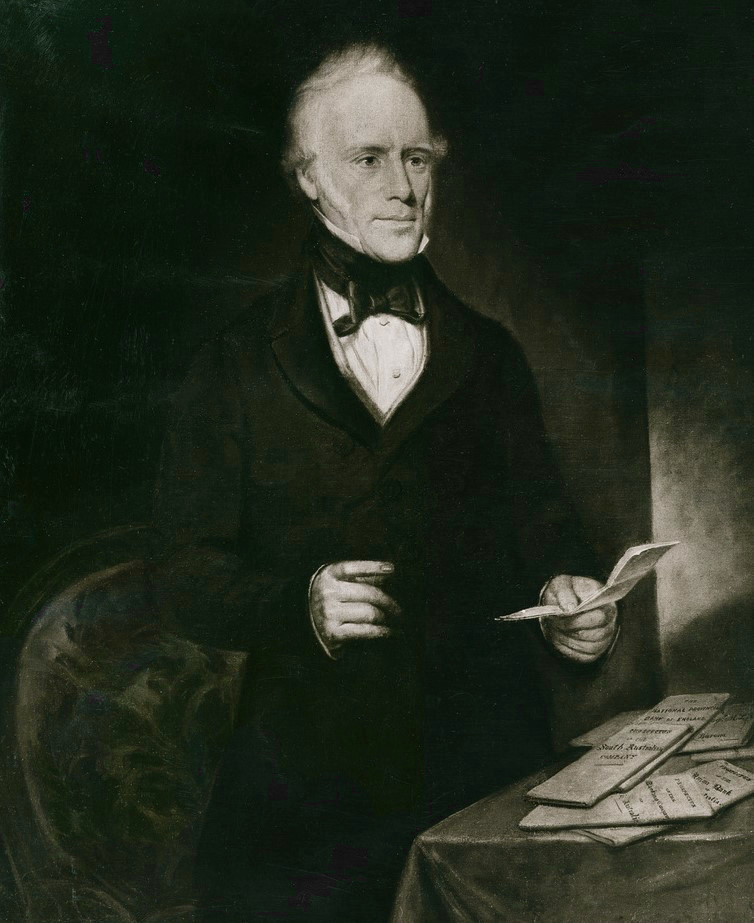
George Fife Angas (c.1860)

Over the next 20 years Angas took a large role in the family business in Newcastle, which also had branches in British ports, the West Indies and Spanish America, and steadily developed his own shipping business in London. By 1831, his business owned three ships, commercial business in British Honduras, Buenos Aires and London, coach factories in Durham and Newcastle, with mahogany trade and copperas works.

Angas came from a non-conformist religious household, and as a religious person became a secretary of the Newcastle Sunday School Union, founded in 1815 to educate poor children in Newcastle and Gateshead. On two occasions after the repeal of the Test Act and the Corporation Act in 1828, which barred non-conformists from public office, Angas was asked to stand for Parliament, but declined partly due to reasons of poor health. He had a talent for banking, and played a large part in the founding of the National Provincial Bank of England in 1833 (which exists today after several mergers as NatWest), sitting as a director on its first board, the Union Bank of Australia (in 1836) and the South Australian Banking Company (in 1840).

In 1835, he held shares in the British American Land Company.

=== South Australia ===
Angas had become relatively wealthy and was concerned with putting his money to the best use. He became interested in a proposed settlement in South Australia and in 1832 joined the committee of the South Australian Land Company and took up enough shares to become a director. His own views on systematic colonisation dealt with the exclusion of convicts, concentration of settlers, sending out (preferably religious) intelligent people with capital, the emigration of young couples of good character, free trade, free government, and freedom of religion. As such, South Australia became the first Australian colony to provide residents with religious freedom and to grant land rights to indigenous people.

Angas was discouraged by the company's failure to get government support, but continued his involvement with the South Australian Association which was formed in 1834, with Robert Gouger as secretary.

During debates on the price of land Angas, who held the opposite view to Edward Gibbon Wakefield, wanted the price of land to be low. However, the South Australian Colonization Commission set a high price for land, which brought sales of land, and hence establishment of the colony, to a standstill. Angas formed a joint-stock company to buy the remaining land, which was transferred in January 1836 to the newly formed South Australian Company. In February 1836, the first of three ships set sail for South Australia with emigrants, livestock and provisions on board. The company supervisors were provided with minutely detailed instructions covering almost any problem which might have arisen. All three ships arrived by the middle of August.

The colonial office, the Colonization Commissioners, and the South Australian Company would determine the success or failure of the colony, and it was still unclear which was the controlling body. There was initial friction between the company and the commissioners. The establishment of a banking business in 1837, and its separation as the South Australian Banking Company in 1840, at the behest of Angas, played an important part in the early growth of the colony. Angas worked on behalf of the bank in England, giving lectures, writing pamphlets and supplying information to newspapers. He also helped to establish the South Australian School Society, and sent out missionaries and German colonists. He set up the Union Bank of Australia in England and also found the time to be active in the colonisation of New Zealand.

In recognition of his efforts in making New Zealand a British colony rather than a French colony, Angas was offered a knighthood and a then baronetcy, but he declined both.

Angas was also a leading figure in attempting to establish and secure proper treatment of the Aboriginal people of South Australia. "Mr Angas set before himself the model of William Penn and his treaty with the North American Indians for establishing friendly and equitable relations with the Europeans." Using his position as Commissioner, he attempted to secure Aboriginal rights in both legislature and through financing missionary actions.

In 1836, Angas met with Pastor August Kavel, who was Pastor in Klępsk (Klemzig) in Prussia. Kavel and his Lutheran congregation at Klemzig faced oppression due to decrees made by King Frederick William III. They sought to regain their religious freedom by emigrating to another country. Angas sent his chief clerk, Charles Flaxman to Prussia to meet with Kavel's group. Flaxman, on returning, gave a favorable report to Angas, who then sought to have the South Australian Company meet the cost of the transport for the whole congregation from Hamburg to South Australia. This request was declined, and so Angas made a loan to this group of emigrants, by meeting the cost of securing vessels himself. In 1838 Angas chartered four ships on their behalf; Prince George, Bengalee, Zebra, and Catharina. This loan, along with another Angas had made to his chief clerk Charles Flaxman (who invested in land in South Australia), put Angas in a difficult financial situation the next year. Angas had borrowed heavily and was forced to sell his interests in the Union Bank and other companies.

News came that the British government had dishonoured drafts drawn by the Governor, George Gawler and that the colony was in danger of ruin. Angas appealed to the government, his efforts resulting in a loan to the colony and payment of the dishonoured drafts.

In 1842 Angas lectured extensively on South Australia and wrote a pamphlet, "Facts Illustrative of South Australia", which was widely distributed. Gawler, who had been recalled to England, suggested that Angas should settle in South Australia. In early 1843, his finances still troubled, he sent out his 19-year-old son John Howard Angas to supervise his land and recover the family fortunes. Angas was unable to sell his northern England properties until 1850 but some repayments had come in from the German settlers. The stress had affected his health and he decided to migrate to Australia, arriving in Adelaide with his wife and youngest son in January 1851.

=== Slavery ===
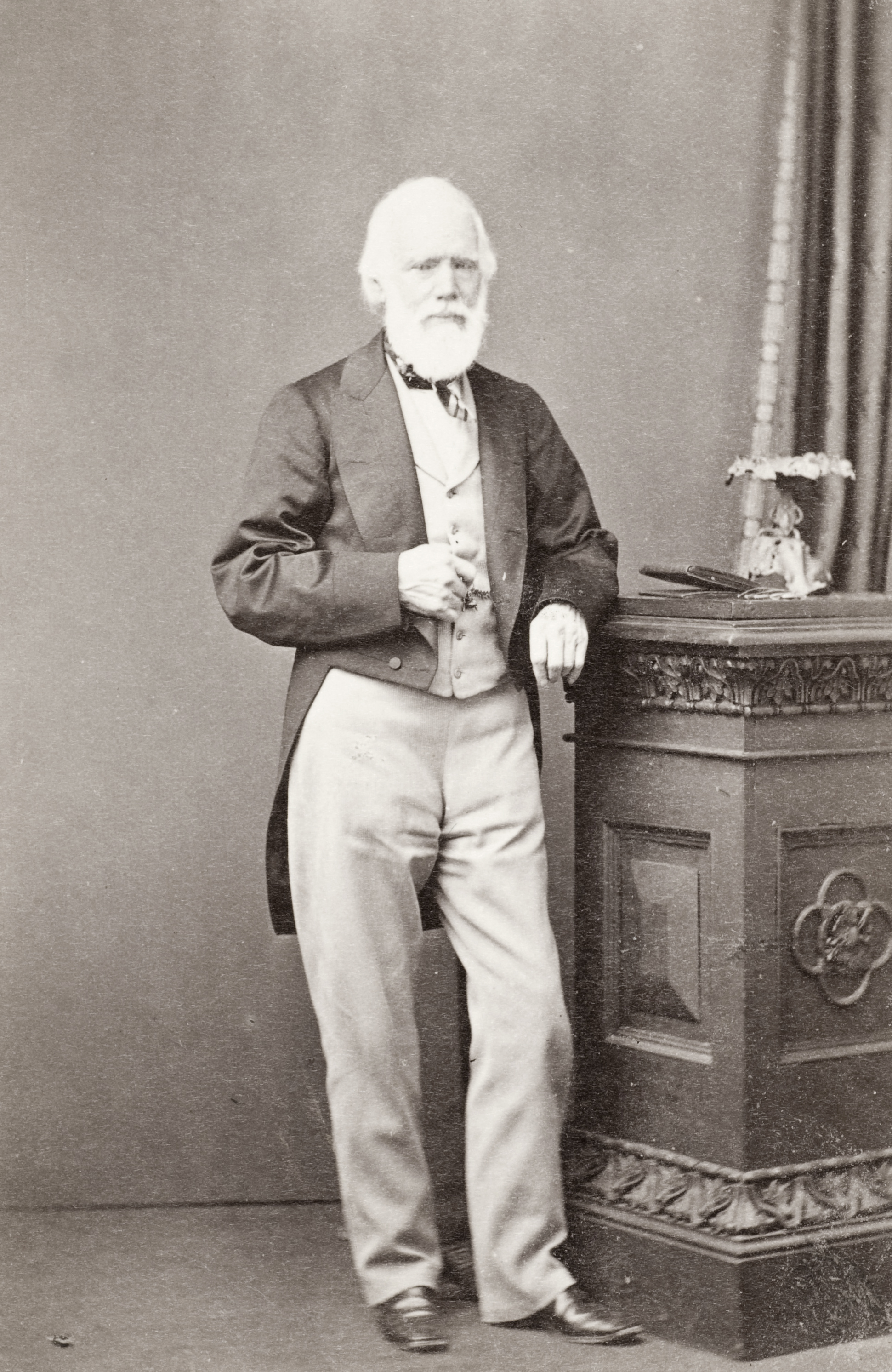
George Fife Angas, 1870

According to Humphrey McQueen and Catherine Hall, the Angas family business supply chain included dealings with businesses in the Caribbean that used slaves. McQueen, as well as Clinton Fernandes and journalists Paul Daley and Peter Goers went further than others, incorrectly arguing or implying that Angas was an actual slave owner who was compensated by the British government.

Angas is not recorded by the Legacies of British Slave-ownership database as having held slaves himself, nor of having obtained any meaningful benefit from them. As was typical for the period, his business associates in British Honduras included people who owned slaves. He collected compensatory claims on behalf of four former slave owners, totalling £6,942 after abolition, with a total of 121 slaves.

The claims he collected were:

- 5 October 1835, Honduras 231, 40 enslaved, £2176 17/3d, equivalent to £268,963.15 in 2024
- 26 October 1835, Honduras 51, 12 enslaved, £685 15/1d, equivalent to £84,728.22 in 2024
- 26 October 1835, Honduras 199, 35 enslaved, £1642 17/2d, equivalent to £202,984.48 in 2024
- 9 November 1835, Honduras 244, 34 enslaved, £2439 17/3d, equivalent to £301,458.26 in 2024

On 12 June 1840, he was delegate number 196, one of eight representing Newcastle upon Tyne, at the World Anti-Slavery Convention.

A commemorative newspaper article in The Advertiser (an Adelaide daily) in 1909 described how Angas sought to protect the poorer classes from oppression and endeavoured to help slaves who, he argued, were held in illegal bondage. In 1824, over 200 Indians were set free as a result of his efforts.

== Later life, death and legacy ==
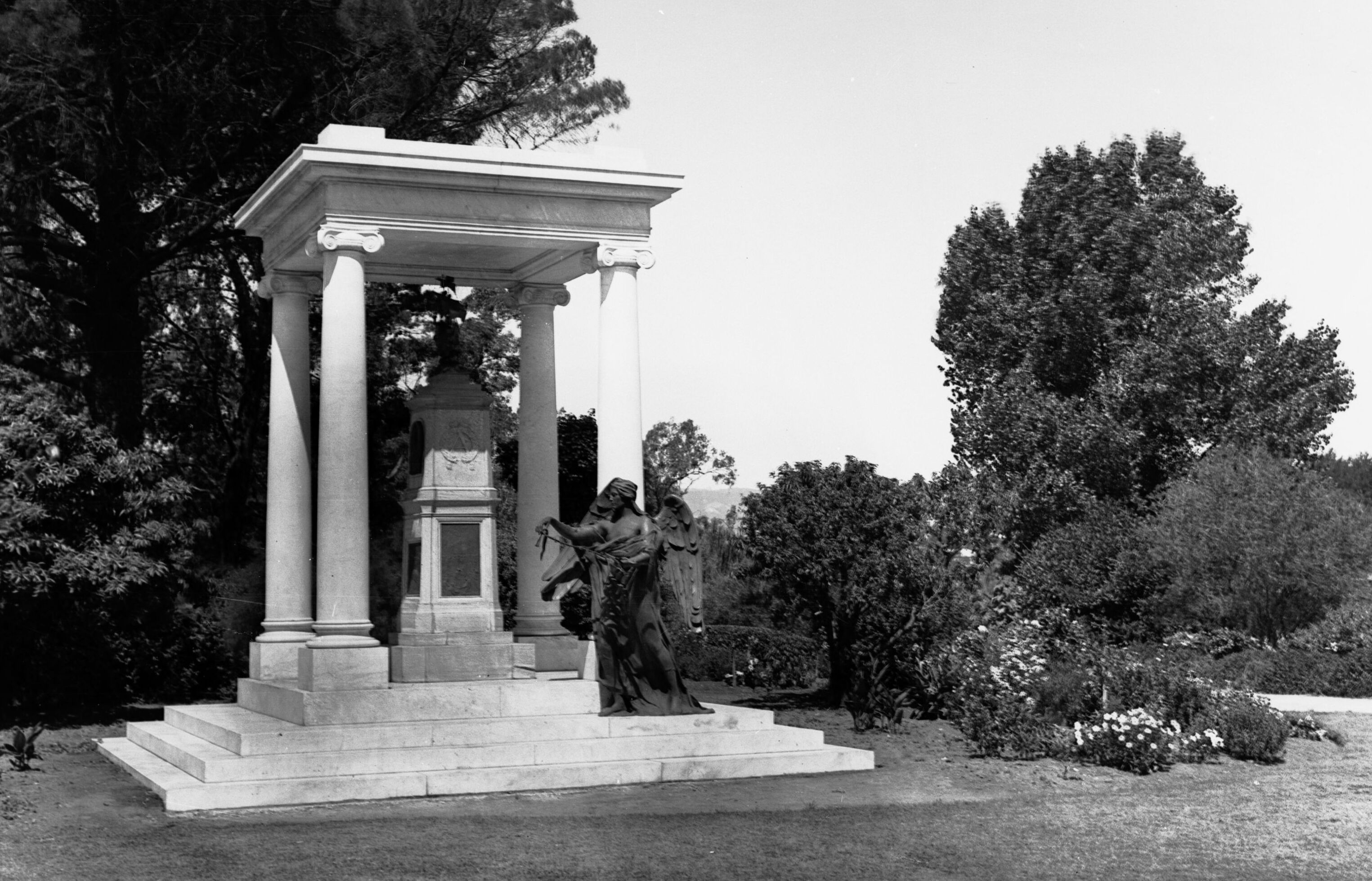
Angas Memorial in Angas Gardens

Upon arriving in Adelaide in January 1851, Angas, by then almost 62, was met by his two sons and eldest daughter. His work on behalf of the colony was widely known and a few days later a public dinner was held in his honour. He found work, becoming elected as a member of the Legislative Council for the Barossa district and turned his attention towards education and other public interests. Being kept busy improved his health, and he was able to pay off his debts in short order.

Angas bought Merino sheep and cattle, employing out-of work migrants on his property. He returned to England from 1857 to September 1859 to settle matters in his father's estate. He continued parliamentary work and lobbied against South Australia being given responsibility for the administration of the Northern Territory. He resigned in 1866, feeling that he could not fully fulfil his role, and continued to contribute to schools, churches and charities. His wife of 55 years died in 1867.

In 1869 he published The History of the Newcastle-on-Tyne Sunday School Union, which was compiled by secretary William Ramage Lawson. (Note: Lawson was later (1866–1870) with the Register and in 1890 editor of the Financial Times. Lawson's successor as secretary to Angas was Henry Hussey, a fellow-religionist, who collected and selected documents for his proposed biography, eventually written by Edwin Hodder (1837–1904).) Although retired from parliamentary duties, managing his property at Angaston gave him plenty to do.

He recovered from a serious illness at 87 and died on 15 May 1879 at 90 years of age. He was survived by three sons, notably John Howard Angas and George French Angas, and three daughters.

A grandson, James Angas Johnson (c. 1842 – 19 May 1902), generally referred to as J. Angas Johnson, was one of the founding trustees of the Savings Bank of South Australia. His son E. Angas Johnson (1873–1951), was City Health Officer of Adelaide, and a defender of his father's reputation.

Angas' financial contribution of some £40,000 was instrumental to the creation of South Australia.

== See also ==
- British colonisation of South Australia
- History of Adelaide

== Sources ==
- Hodder, Edwin (1891). George Fife Angas, Father and Founder of South Australia. London: Hodder and Stoughton. LCCN 47036965. OCLC 5072687. OL 7066984M.

== General references ==
- Serle, Percival (1949). "Angas, George Fife". Dictionary of Australian Biography. Sydney: Angus & Robertson.
- "Angas, George Fife (1789–1879)". Australian Dictionary of Biography. Vol. 1. National Centre of Biography, Australian National University. 1966. pp. 15–18. ISBN 978-0-522-84459-7. ISSN 1833-7538. OCLC 70677943.
- "The Confessional Lutheran Emigrations From Prussia And Saxony Around 1839", Westerhaus, Martin O.
