= HDMS Skjold =

HDMS Skjold is the name of the following ships of the Royal Danish Navy:

- HDMS Skjold (1792)
- HDMS Skjold (1896)

== See also ==
- HNoMS Skjold (P963)
- Skjold (disambiguation)
- Skjold (1839 ship)
