= Hermann Herlitz =

Prussian Lutheran pastor (1834–1920)

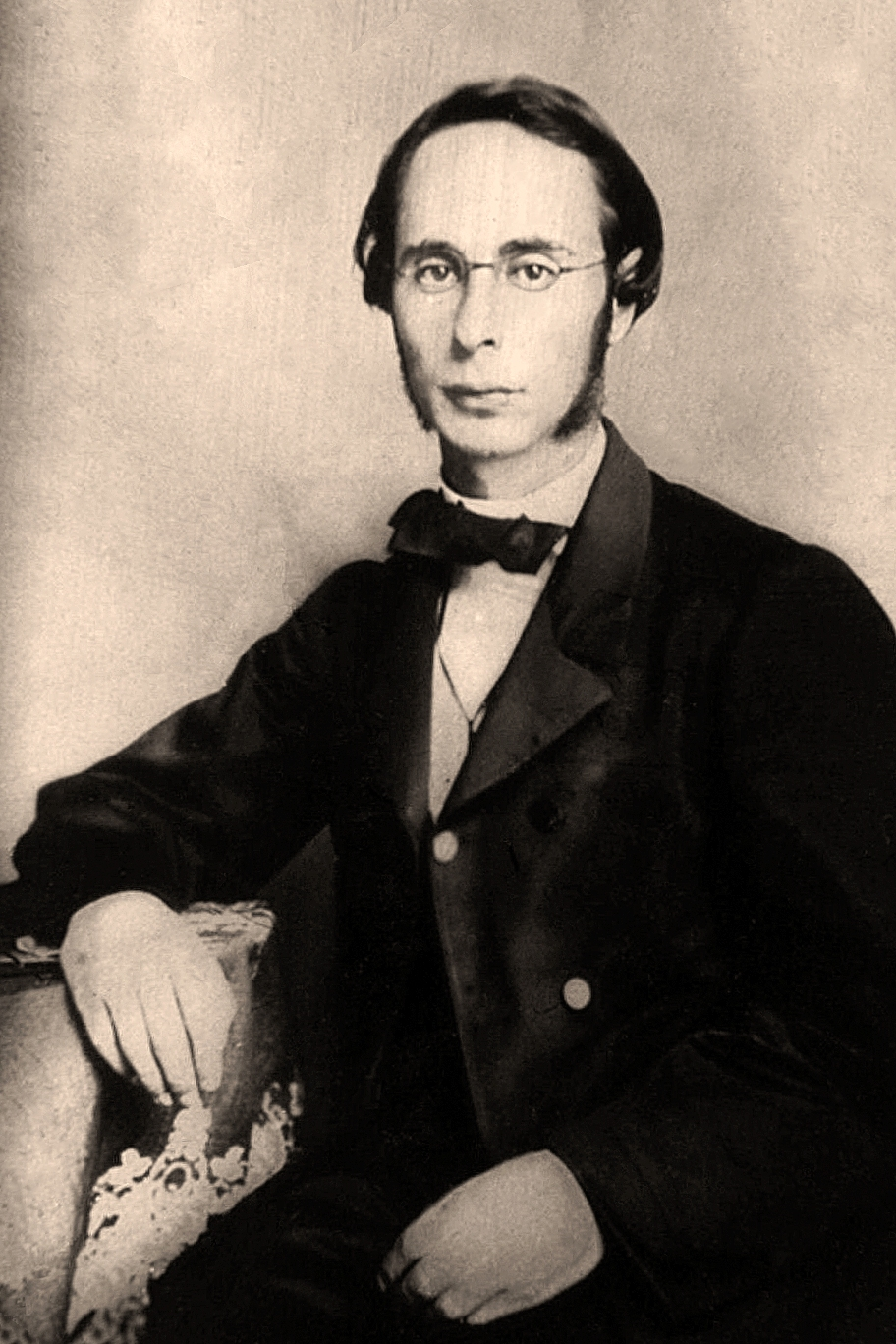
- Herlitz at the Basel Mission in 1857
- Born: 10 June 1834; Neiße, Prussia
- Died: 9 June 1920 (aged 85)
- Occupation: Pastor
- Spouse: Wilhelmine Feldmann (m. 1864; died 1917)
- Ordained: 17 August 1862

Hermann Herlitz (10 June 1834 – 9 June 1920) was a Prussia Lutheran pastor. He was the pastor of the Lutheran Trinity Church in East Melbourne, Australia, for 46. He was president of the Evangelical Lutheran Synod of Victoria and of the Evangelical Lutheran General Synod. Born to Jewish parents, he converted to Christianity in 1857.

== Personal life ==
Herlitz was born on 10 June 1834 in Neiße, Silesia, Prussia (now Nysa, Poland). He was the only child of Jewish parents although his father died before he was born. He attended a Lutheran primary school from age 5, and a Catholic grammar school from age 10. He also studied Hebrew and Judaism until his bar mitzvah at age 13.

Herlitz left school in his final year, at age 16. He then completed a commercial apprenticeship and worked as a clerk, bookkeeper and salesman for several companies over six years. After moving to London his money was stolen and he was forced to sell his belongings. He turned to Dr J. C. Ewald for assistance. Ewald was of Jewish descent and a graduate of the Basel Evangelical Missionary Society and after three months of deliberation Herlitz was baptised by Ewald on 1 March 1857. After studying at the Basel Mission Society, Herlitz was ordained on 17 August 1862, and in January 1863 was the first of their graduates to arrive in Australia.

Herlitz married Wilhelmine "Minnie" Feldmann on 27 September 1864; they had three surviving children.

Herlitz was naturalised on 25 July 1865; he died on 9 June 1920.

== Grovedale ==
Herlitz's first position as a pastor was in Germantown (now known as Grovedale) in Victoria, Australia. After arriving in Victoria on 23 January 1863, Herlitz was advised that the Germantown congregation had revoked his call, with one group led by Pastor Peter Jacobsen occupying the church and manse, while another wanted Herlitz to be their pastor. Herlitz arrived at Germantown in January 1863 and took legal action against the leaders of the congregation for breach of contract. A settlement left Jacobsen in control of the church and manse, while Herlitz received compensation for non-employment and loss of the manse.

The conservative group supporting Jacobsen believed that the Basel Mission Society was unionistic and non-confessional. Herlitz acted as pastor of the St Pauls congregation at Germantown, ministering from the school for five years.

== East Melbourne ==
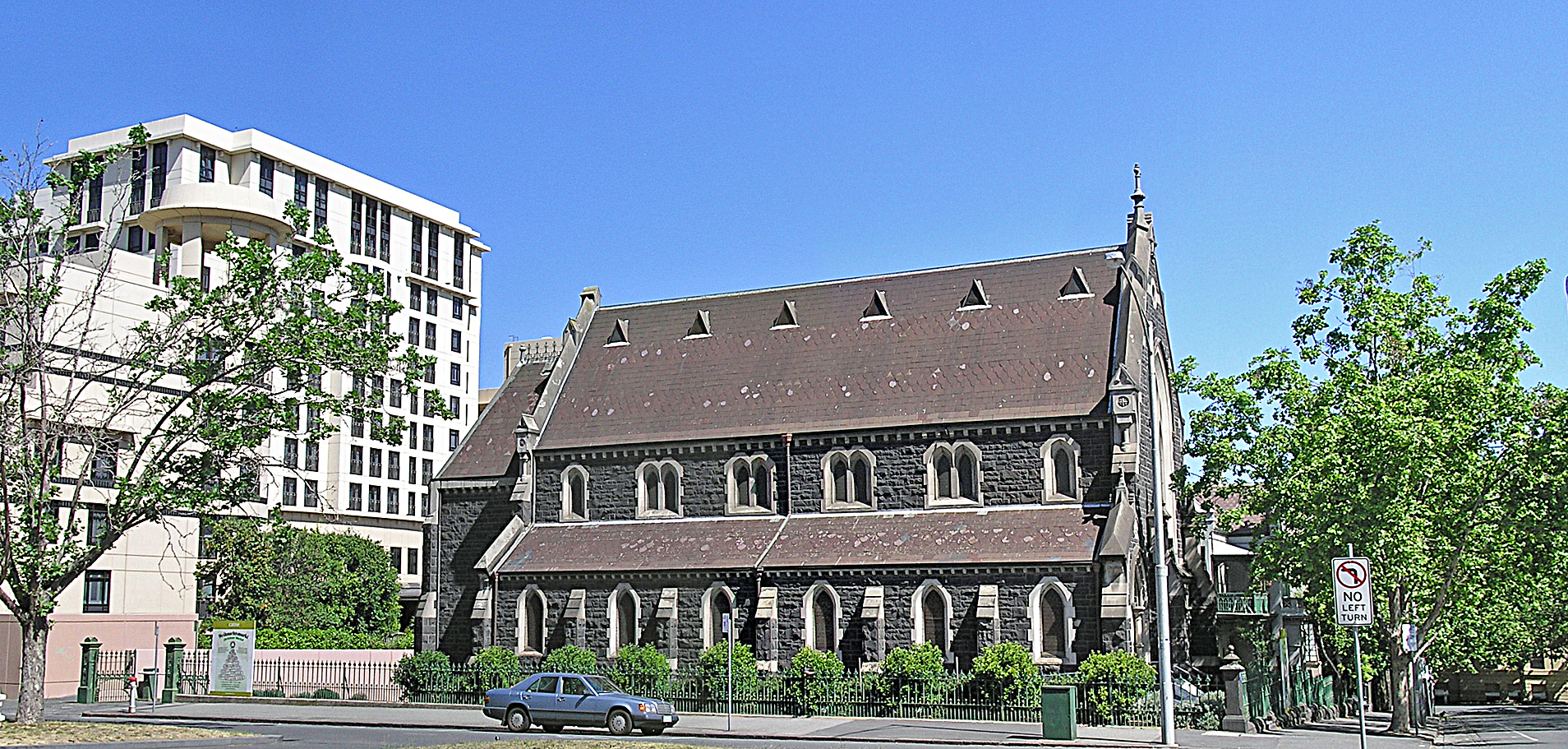
Lutheran Trinity Church, East Melbourne, built in 1874 while Herlitz was pastor

In February 1867, Matthias Goethe requested six months' leave from his role as pastor of the Lutheran Trinity Church in East Melbourne. As a temporary replacement, Herlitz was invited to conduct two services a month at the Trinity Church and to edit Der Australische Christenbote (The Australian Christian Messenger). Goethe did not return to Melbourne; instead he sent a letter of resignation in December 1867. Two pastors, Herlitz and Friedrich Munzel, were considered as successors to Goethe with Herlitz chosen by lot; he became pastor of Trinity Church on 22 March 1868.

In 1874 a new church was built on the site of the existing Trinity Church. This was followed in 1890 by a new manse adjacent to the church.

Church services were in German. Herlitz proposed that some evening services should be in English to increase attendances but no change occurred.

Due to poor health, Herlitz resigned on 14 June 1914 after 46 years as pastor of the Trinity Church.

== Work ==
In addition to his work as pastor of the Trinity Church, Herlitz ministered several outlying congregations and was editor of the monthly Der Australische Christenbote from 1867 to 1910.

Herlitz was president of the Evangelical Lutheran Synod of Victoria (ELSV) from 1868 to 1914 and president of the Evangelical Lutheran General Synod from 1876 to 1914. The ELSV was part of the Victorian Council of Churches from the Council's formation and was the only Lutheran organisation to join. Herlitz was president of the Council from 1896 to 1897.

Like many pastors from the Basel Mission Society, Herlitz regarded all protestant denominations as having a common goal of following God's teachings. Accordingly, Herlitz strove for unity among the Australian Lutheran congregations and was disappointed that his work was sometimes regarded as drifting away from traditional Lutheranism. Herlitz advocated for the union of Lutheran synods in the General Synod while opposing the idea that union could only involve groups following the strict confessionalism of the South Australian Lutherans.

== See also ==
- History of the Lutheran Church of Australia
