= History of the Lutheran Church of Australia =

Aspect of religious history in Australia

The history of the Lutheran Church of Australia is the sequence of events related to divisions, mergers and affiliations of Lutheran church organisations from the time Lutheranism first arrived in Australia, to the time of unification of the two main synods in 1966.

== First Lutheran body in Australia (Kavel-Fritzsche Synod) ==
The first Lutherans to come to Australia in any significant number were Old Lutherans who refused to join the Prussian Union under King Frederick Wilhelm III and, sponsored by George Fife Angas, arrived in South Australia in 1838 with Pastor August Kavel and settled in Klemzig and Hahndorf. On 23 and 24 May 1839, Kavel convened a meeting of church elders under a great gum tree (Note: Perhaps "The Big Tree" which stood for a hundred years at the intersection of four roads: Glen Osmond Road, Cross Road, Mount Barker Road (later South Eastern Freeway), and Portrush Road.) at Glen Osmond and adopted the constitution of the new Australian Lutheran synod.

In 1841, a second wave of Prussian immigrants arrived with Pastor Gotthard Fritzsche. They settled in Lobethal and Bethanien.

== Division into Immanuel Synod and Evangelical Lutheran Synod of Australia ==
Relations with the earlier Prussian settlers was initially quite harmonious; however this soon changed. In 1842, Kavel, in an attempt to consolidate the settlers into one localized community, strongly urged the settlers in the early settlements at Klemzig and Hahndorf to relocate to the newly settled Langmeil. Many of the settlers in these towns refused, and an underlying tension arose between these communities and Kavel.

At the synodical gatherings of 1844 and 1845, the subject of millennialism was discussed. Kavel who had developed millennialistic views, was preaching on the subject. Fritzsche disagreed with millennialism, and had the subject discussed at these gatherings. No resolution was reached by the end of the synod in 1845. This disagreement between the two pastors divided the Lutheran community.

In 1846, Kavel released a proclamation regarding the power of civil government in the church. Kavel specifically pronounced disagreements with the Lutheran Confessions, favoring instead statements made in the 1838 church constitution. Fritzsche explicitly disagreed with Kavel, affirming the Confessions over the constitution. As a result, the divide between the followers of Fritzsche and of Kavel intensified.

At the synodical gathering at Bethany, on 16 and 17 August 1846, the most significant event took place. The subject of millennialism was once again brought up, and as the discussion became heated, Kavel and his followers left the synod. They went to nearby Langmeil and had their own synod gathering there, while the remainder continued with their synod. The followers of Kavel formed the Immanuel Synod, and those of Fritzsche, the Evangelical Lutheran Synod of South Australia. The latter was renamed as the Evangelical Lutheran Synod of Australia (ELSA) in 1863.

After Kavel's (1860), and Fritzsche's (1863) deaths, the Immanuel Synod, and the ELSA were able to reconcile some of their differences. This resulted in a "Confessional Union", but not an organizational merger.

== Evangelical Lutheran Church of Australia ==
The ELSA continued to coexist independently with the other Lutheran synods until 1866. It underwent a name change in 1944, to the Evangelical Lutheran Church of Australia (ELCA). One group broke away from the ELSA in 1904, and became a district of the Evangelical Lutheran Joint Synod of Ohio. This group called themselves the Evangelical Lutheran Synod of Australia auf alter Grundlage (ELSA a.a. G) (auf alter Grundlage being German for "on old basis").

== Lutherans in Victoria ==
In 1856, a new independent synod, the Evangelical Lutheran Synod of Victoria (ELSV), with Pastor Matthias Goethe serving as president, was founded to serve the Lutheran congregations in Victoria.

== General Synod and the Immanuel Synod ==
In 1860, the year of Kavel's death, a group broke away from the Immanuel Synod. This break away group developed a union with the ELSV that was called the Evangelical Lutheran General Synod (General Synod).

In 1874, the Immanuel Synod also developed an affiliation with the ELSV. The ELSA was opposed to the practice of ELSV calling non-Lutheran pastors, so the Confessional Union they had with Immanuel Synod was dissolved. With this event the Immanuel Synod renamed themselves the Evangelical Lutheran Immanuel Synod (ELIS).

The ELIS in 1884 broke ties with the General Synod, due to this same practice of calling non-Lutheran pastors. When this event occurred in 1884, a small group from the ELIS choose not to break away, and they organised as a separate synod named the Evangelical Lutheran Immanuel Synod auf alter Grundlage (ELIS a.a. G).

== Lutherans in Queensland ==
In 1885, two Lutheran groups formed in Queensland, namely, the Evangelical Lutheran Synod of Queensland (ELSQ) and the United German-Scandinavian Evangelical Lutheran Synod of Queensland (UGSELSQ). The ELSQ was initially independent, but joined the General Synod in 1889. The UGSELSQ was also independent at first but merged with the ELIS in 1910.

== United Evangelical Lutheran Church in Australia ==
After World War I, Papua New Guinea was put into the hands of the Australian government. As part of this, a large number of German missionaries were to be transferred to the control of Australian churches. This issue is cited as a major reason for the formal amalgamation in 1921 of all the independent synods affiliated in the General Synod and the ELIS. The new organization was known as the United Evangelical Lutheran Church in Australia (UELCA). The ELSA a.a. G, which had continued to operate independently since they formed in 1904, merged with UELCA in 1926.

== Merger of UELCA and ELCA into the Lutheran Church of Australia ==
On 27 August 1956, the UELCA and ELCA both adopted the Theses of Agreement, which set the stage for the merging of the two organizations. The final merge occurred in Tanunda, South Australia, at a joint synod held on 29 October to 2 November 1966. The merged organization was named the Lutheran Church of Australia (LCA).

In 1973, the Lutheran Church of Australia published its first hymnal, the Lutheran Hymnal, revised in the mid-1980s into the present hymn book, the Lutheran Hymnal with Supplement.

== Sources ==
- ‘Guide to Compiling a Connection Report for Native Title Claims in Queensland October 2003’, ‘Native Title and Indigenous Land Services’
- 'Records from the following Lutheran Churches', Lutheran Church of Australia Archives
- 'Synod Diagram', Lutheran Church of Australia Archives (Good diagrammatical representation. Nomenclature varies)
- Wilhelm Iwan, Because of their beliefs: emigration from Prussia to Australia [Uniform title: Um des Glaubens willen nach Australien (Engl.), 1931], David Schubert (trl. and ed.), Highgate, South Australia: H. Schubert, 1995. ISBN 0-646-25324-7.
- Wilhelm Iwan, Die altlutherische Auswanderung um die Mitte des 19. Jahrhunderts: 2 vols. (i.e. The Old Lutheran Emigration at the Middle of the 19th Century), Johann-Heß-Institut Breslau (ed.), Ludwigsburg: Eichhornverlag Lothar Kallenberg, 1943, vol. II (list of emigrants), Retrieved 25 February 2016.
