= Lutheran Trinity Church, East Melbourne =

Lutheran church in Melbourne, Australia

Lutheran Trinity Church
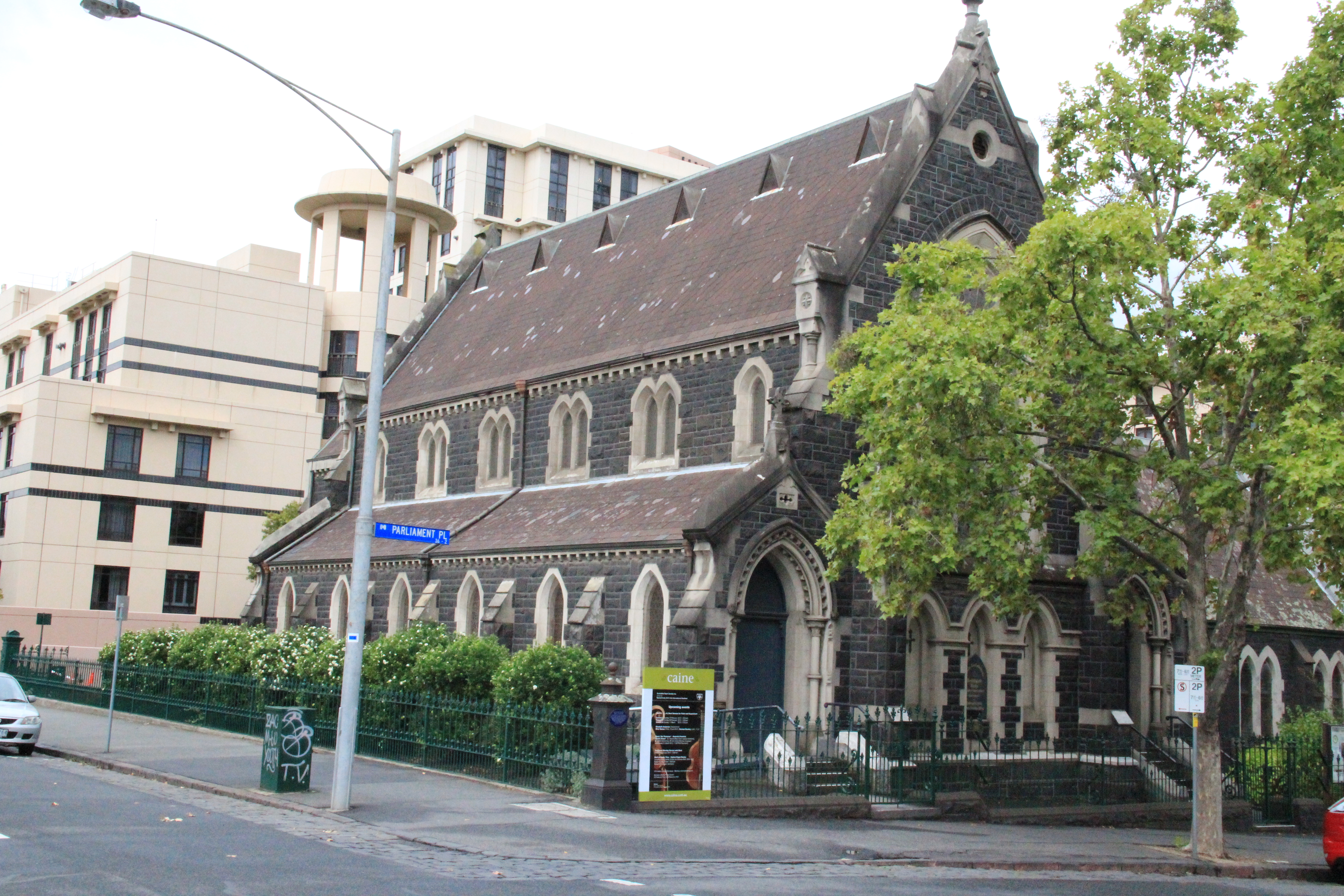
- Church in 2012, with hall on right

- Location within Victoria Location within Australia
- 37°48′39.5″S 144°58′32.8″E
- Location: 22 Parliament Place, East Melbourne, Victoria, Australia

The Lutheran Trinity Church in East Melbourne, Australia, is a Lutheran heritage-listed church. It was built in 1874 and was added to the Victorian Heritage Register on 9 October 1974. The church is on Parliament Place, immediately to the south of St Patrick's Cathedral and east of Parliament House. Most church services are in German.

== History ==
The first church, built in 1854, was replaced in 1874 by the existing structure.

Half an acre of land (2,000 m^{2}) in East Melbourne was granted on 19 January 1853 for construction of a church. Donations, a government grant and a bank loan covered the cost; the foundation stone was laid on 27 September 1853 and the dedication of the completed church occurred on 11 June 1854. Additional land was granted in February 1855 for the manse.

From 1870, discussions occurred concerning enlargement of the church and repairs that were required. The sale of some land allowed the construction of a new church; its foundation stone was laid on 17 March 1874 and the completed church was dedicated on 22 November 1874.

Architect John Koch, a member of the Trinity Church Committee, started preparing plans for the second church but another architect, Carl Blackmann, offered his services free of charge. Blackmann, also known as Charles Blachmann, sent plans which were accepted. Koch later designed the manse which was built in 1890.

Matthias Goethe was appointed as the church's first pastor on 25 March 1853. Goethe was succeeded by Hermann Herlitz who was the pastor from 1868 to 1914.

== Description ==
The church is built of bluestone with a pitched slate roof. The building follows a basilica design. The church exterior is 27 by 13 metres (90 by 42 feet) with an interior height to the apex of the ceiling of 14 metres (46 feet). The church was intended to hold from 370 to 500 people.

Internally, each side of the church has five pointed and moulded arches which separate the aisle from the nave. The arches are supported by columns with foliated capitals.

== Heritage listing ==
The church, hall, manse, fencing and land were added to the Victorian Heritage Register on 9 October 1974. The heritage statement of significance mentions that the congregation has occupied the site continuously since 1853, and that services have always been conducted in German. As of 2021, an English-language service is held every fourth Sunday, with German-language services on other Sundays. The architecturally important bluestone church shows a rich interior decoration, with a timber ceiling and stained glass by Ferguson and Urie.

A pipe organ was dedicated on 16 May 1875. The church heritage listing states that the organ is significant for having been built by Robert Mackenzie and, while having been rebuilt twice, for retaining the original pipework and case.

== See also ==
- History of the Lutheran Church of Australia
