= Gotthard Fritzsche =

Lutheran pastor (1797–1863)

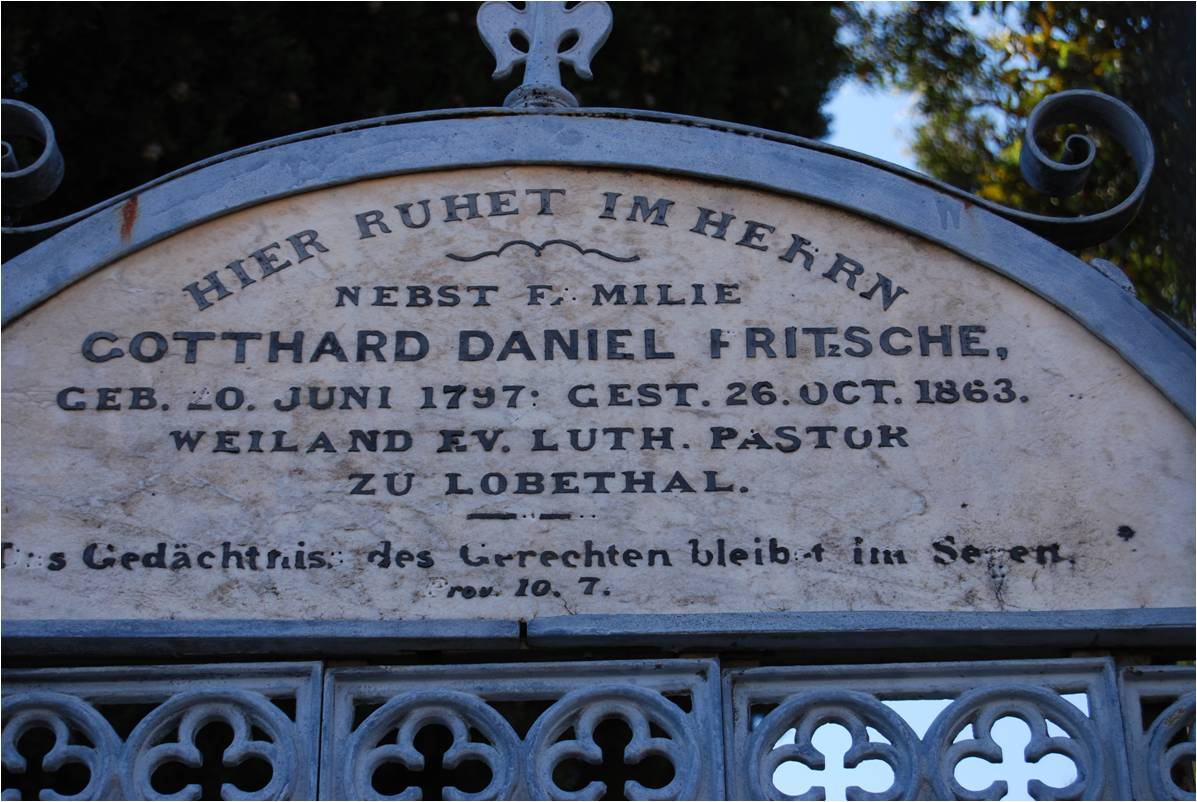
Gravestone of Gotthard Fritzsche in Lobethal: Hier ruhet im Herrn (Here rests in the Lord), Geboren 20. Juni 1797, Gestorben 26. Oct. 1863.

Gotthard Daniel Fritzsche (20 July 1797 – 26 October 1863) (Note: The gravestone has birthdate as 20 June 1797, not July ("Geboren 20. Juni 1797").) was a Prussian Lutheran pastor who became instrumental in furthering that religion in South Australia. He was born in Liebenwerda, in the Electorate of Saxony, Germany, and migrated to Australia in 1841. From 1842 to 1863, he was pastor of the Evangelical Lutheran Church. He died and was buried at Lobethal, South Australia.

== Early life, training, and early ministry ==
Gotthard Fritzsche was born in Liebenwerda, in the Electorate of Saxony, where his father was town musician. He attended gymnasium in Dresden, but while studying, his hometown became part of Prussia following the Congress of Vienna, so he was required to enter military service for a short period. He went to Breslau after his gymnasium training, to receive his university training. There he studied under Johann Gottfried Scheibel. As was customary, after his university education, he served as a private tutor.

At his first examination for entering the ministry, he declared himself to be against the Prussian Union, and was banned from ministry in the State church. He joined the underground Old Lutheran church as a Flying Pastor, who travelled from place to place disguised as a travelling tradesman, performing secret worship services and rites to those opposed to the State church. He was taken on by a man called Zahn, lord of the manor at Turowo, who was a sympathetic Lutheran. He was the only Lutheran pastor who is known to have avoided imprisonment, while still remaining in the country. After a time, he grew weary of the work, and he travelled to Hamburg.

== Immigration to Australia ==
Fritzsche arrived in Hamburg when a group of Prussian Old Lutherans were searching for financing and a pastor to join their group in emigrating to South Australia. In 1840, at the synodical gathering of the newly constituted Lutheran Church in Australia, a request had been sent to the Old Lutherans in Prussia to send a second pastor to the young German settlement. A requirement had been imposed on them by the Prussian government, that they must be accompanied by a pastor before being allowed to emigrate.

Fritzsche was not eager to emigrate. He had already declined an invitation by Johannes Grabau to emigrate to the United States. However, he did relent to the requests of the people who were waiting to emigrate to South Australia. Fritzsche travelled to England to meet with George Angas in an attempt to gain financing for the balance of the fares, a sum of over £2000. Angas was unable to provide any financing to the group. It was in early June that a letter was received from a "Mrs. Richardson in Newcastle UK", with a sum of £270. The remainder of the required finances (£1800) was donated by one of the other emigrants, Mrs Anna (Hannchen) Nehrlich. Fritzsche had become engaged to her daughter Johanna Dorothea (Dorchen, Dorette), while in Hamburg.

The group set sail for Australia, on 11 July 1841 on the ship Skjold, arriving on 28 October 1841 at Port Misery, South Australia. The migrants briefly settled at Klemzig and Glen Osmond but soon moved to Lobethal, and Bethanien. Fritzsche made his home at Lobethal.

== Settlement in South Australia ==
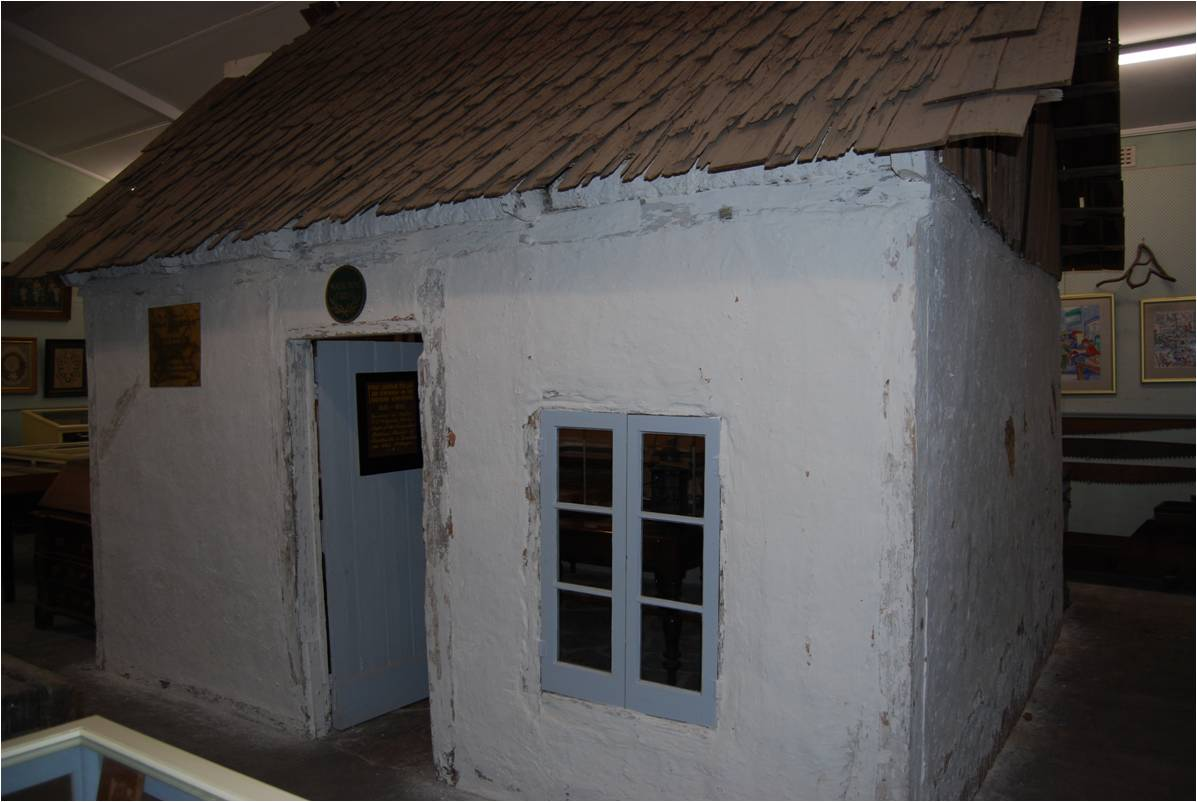
Original Seminary School in Lobethal

Fritzsche took on pastoral duties at Lobethal and the neighbouring communities, as part of the German settlement in Australia. In Lobethal he founded the faith community zum Weinberge Christi ("Christ's Vineyard") that would build St John's Lutheran Church in 1845. He lived in Hahndorf for the first few years before settling permanently in Lobethal. Relations with the earlier Prussian settlers was initially harmonious, but soon deteriorated. In 1842 Pastor August Kavel, in an attempt to consolidate the settlers into one localised community, strongly urged the settlers in the early settlements at Klemzig and Hahndorf to relocate to the newly settled Langmeil. Many of the settlers in these towns refused, and an underlying tension arose between these communities and Pastor Kavel.

== Division in the Church ==
Over time, Fritzsche learned that Kavel had developed a millennialistic point of view (which Fritzsche disagreed with), and had the subject discussed at the synod gatherings in 1844 and 1845. No resolution was reached at these gatherings. In addition to this disagreement, Fritzsche also differed with Kavel, in a proclamation released in 1846, regarding the power of civil government in the church. These disagreements between the two pastors intensified a division which had developed in the Lutheran community.

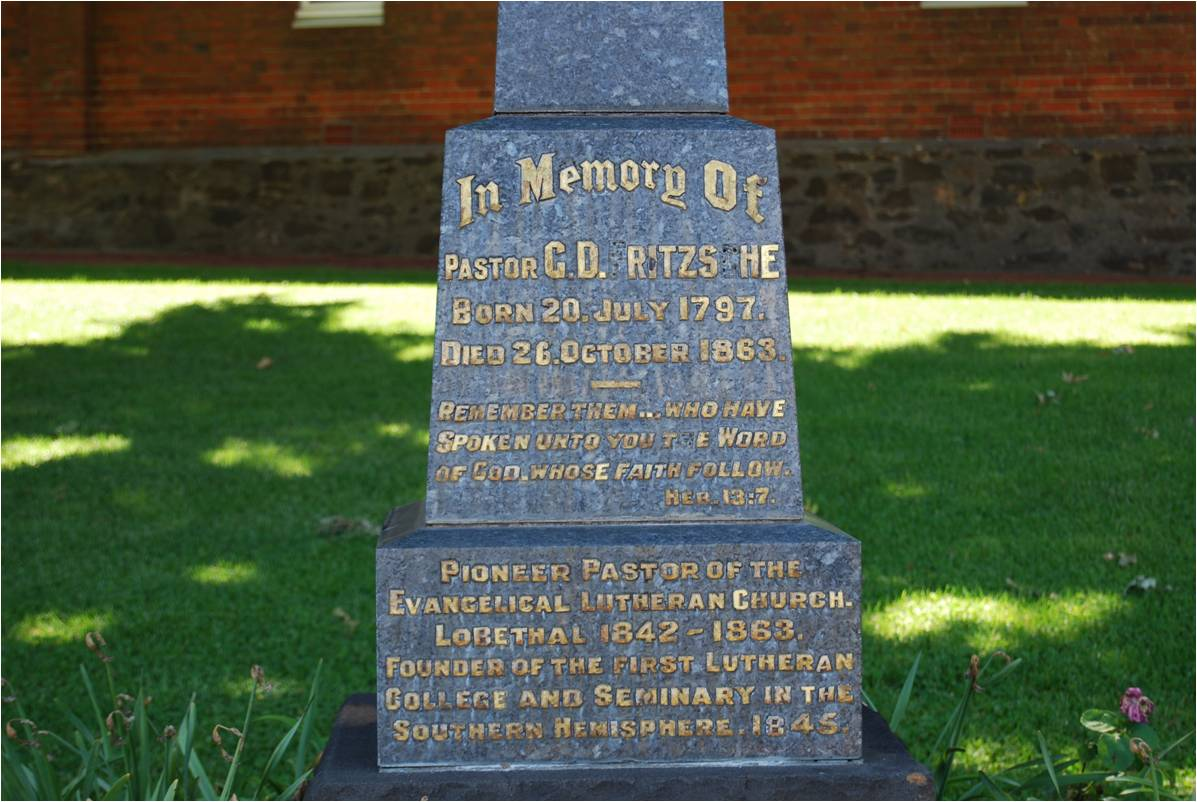
Memorial of Gotthard Fritzsche in Lobethal

At the synodical gathering at Bethany, on 16 and 17 August 1846, the subject of millennialism was again raised, and when the disagreement became heated, a divide was forged, the greatest part of the congregation siding with Fritsche, so the Kavel followers left, forming their own synod, and worshipped in a plain brick church at the southern end of the township. Fritzsche was pastor of St Michael's Lutheran Church, Hahndorf from 1846 to 1855. Ownership of the church property became an issue, but was settled by the Supreme Court in favour of Fritzche's church.

At this point, Fritzsche became the head of the Evangelical Church of South Australia. His prohibition of dancing created antipathy amongst his Lobethal flock, and in 1853 a breakaway group led by Pastor Adelbert Fiedler of Hahndorf founded the rival St Paul's church. (Note: Fiedler returned to Germany in 1874.) Adolph Strempel, one of his Lobethal students, was inaugurated as pastor of Hahndorf in 1855; his duties included ministering to congregations at Callington, Salem, and Monarto.

In later years Fritzsche was assisted by Rev. Dr C. H. Loessel (Lössel). After Fritzsche's death his congregation demanded the sacking of Loessel, and from 1871 were led by Rev. L. F. E. Krause, but he was expelled from the church and the Evangelical synod in May 1876.

== Sources ==
- The Confessional Lutheran Emigrations From Prussia And Saxony Around 1839, Westerhaus, Martin O.
- Records from the following Lutheran Churches, Lutheran Church of Australia Archives
- The Diary of the Voyage, Private webpages of DIANE CUMMINGS
- Australia. and Fritzsche, Gotthard Daniel, Christian Cyclopedia, The Lutheran Church-Missouri Synod
