= Matthias Goethe =

Australian Lutheran pastor

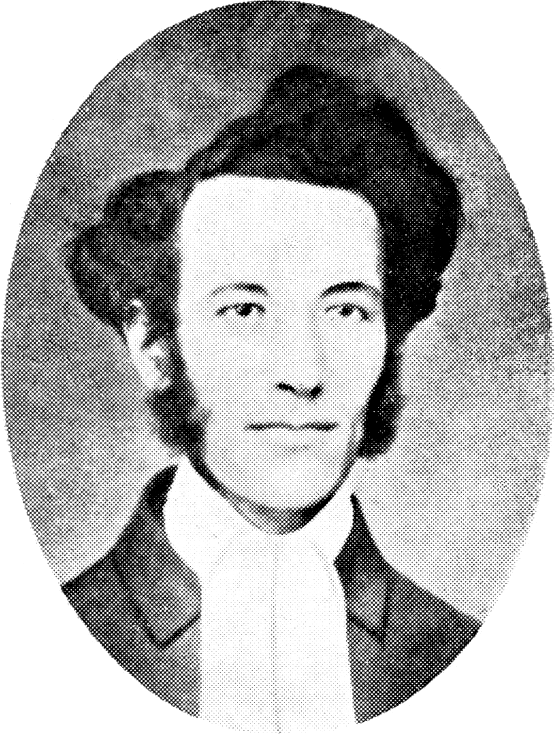
- Born: 29 March 1827; Neuendorf, Rhine Province, Prussia
- Died: 25 October 1876 (aged 49); Mexico City
- Occupation: Pastor
- Spouse: Harriet Alice Wells (m. 1849)
- Ordained: 9 October 1850

Matthias Goethe (29 March 1827 – 25 October 1876), also known as Matthias Göthe or Matthias Goëthe, was pastor of the Lutheran Trinity Church in East Melbourne, Australia, for 14 years from 25 March 1853 to 15 December 1867. He helped form the Evangelical Lutheran Synod of Victoria, was its first president, and established congregations in Australia, the United States and Mexico.

== Personal life ==
Matthias Goethe was born on 29 March 1827 at Neuendorf (now part of Koblenz, Germany), Rhine Province, Prussia, the eldest child of Johann Heinrich Göth, a labourer, and Anna Katharina Günther.

Goethe was baptised as a Roman Catholic. After training to become a Catholic priest, he became a Protestant and went to England. Goethe married Harriet Alice Wells on 9 June 1849 in England after meeting her in Brussels.

In England, Goethe met John Dunmore Lang, a leader of the Presbyterian Church in New South Wales. Lang invited Goethe to become a teacher at Lang's college in Sydney. Goethe took the position but soon moved to Melbourne seeking relief from his asthma.

Goethe was naturalised on 6 July 1854 and died on 25 October 1876 while in Mexico City, survived by his wife and four children, after establishing congregations in Australia, the United States and Mexico.

== Sydney ==
The ship carrying Goethe and his wife from London to Sydney travelled via Melbourne where it spent 32 days before arriving in Sydney on 19 March 1850. In April 1850, Goethe became a teacher of mathematics and languages at Lang's Australian College; he was also licensed to preach. As well as teaching, Goethe conducted religious services in German and French and, on 8 September 1850, gave the first service in German in Sydney. Lang ordained Goethe on 9 October 1850.

Due to a shortage of funding at the college, Goethe was encouraged to become a pastor and he travelled to Melbourne on 17 December 1852.

== Melbourne ==
Goethe reached Melbourne in December 1852, intending to provide ministry for settlers in the Hamilton area.

In Melbourne, a Presbyterian minister, Andrew Ramsay, allowed his St Enoch's United Presbyterian Church to be used by Goethe to provide a Christmas Day service on 25 December 1852 and a regular service on the following day, a Sunday. That was followed by Sunday meetings where Goethe preached to the German congregation. In March 1853 the congregation asked Goethe to become their pastor and, on 25 March 1853, Goethe was appointed as the first Lutheran pastor in Victoria in a service conducted by Presbyterian and Congregational Church ministers.

As well as serving as pastor for the Lutheran Trinity Church in East Melbourne, Goethe established congregations in Grovedale, Ballarat, Bendigo and Castlemaine, and conducted services at other locations.

Starting in July 1853, Goethe produced a monthly paper, Der Pilger in Victoria (The Pilgrim in Victoria), a German-language calendar from 1854, and the Australischer Christenbote (Australian Christian Messenger) from January 1860.

Goethe wanted his congregation to affiliate with the Evangelical Lutheran Synod of Australian (ELSA) but there were insurmountable disagreements concerning the hymn and prayer book used in Victoria and other matters. Instead, an independent synod, the Evangelical Lutheran Synod of Victoria (ELSV), was established with Goethe as president, starting in 1856.

Citing health reasons, Goethe requested six months' leave on 21 February 1867; the congregation meeting of 9 April 1867 was his last in Melbourne. Goethe travelled to Sydney, leaving his family in Melbourne. A congregation meeting on 15 December 1867 discussed a letter from Goethe saying that he had reached San Francisco in August 1867 and wanted to resign as their pastor. His resignation was accepted, with a letter of rebuke saying that no one in the congregation believed that Goethe had intended to return when he left Melbourne. He was succeeded by Hermann Herlitz.

== Sacramento ==
On 30 August 1867, Goethe arrived in San Francisco by sea, having departed from Sydney. He was advised that Sacramento needed a Lutheran pastor so he travelled there, arriving on 24 September 1867. He advertised a German service to be held in a local hall and led the first service at St. John's Lutheran Church on 29 September 1867.

Goethe remained in Sacramento for eight years, establishing a school and leading the new Lutheran congregation. Incorporated in April 1868, the congregation purchased a Methodist church and built a new church which was opened in December 1873.

In 1875 Goethe went on leave for health reasons.

== Mexico City ==
While on leave, Goethe travelled by ship to Acapulco in September 1875, then by mule to Mexico City. After advertising, he helped form a German congregation and was its first pastor. Goethe preached in German, English and Spanish, and translated Luther's Small Catechism into Spanish.

Twelve months after arriving in Mexico City, Goethe died there on 25 October 1876.

== See also ==
- History of the Lutheran Church of Australia
