= W. R. Lawson =

British journalist, economist and author (1840–1922)

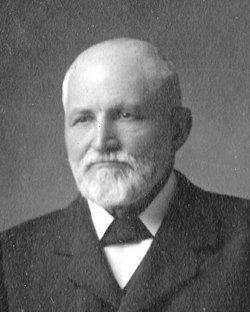
- Born: William Ramage Lawson; 3 December 1840; Kirriemuir, Scotland
- Died: 15 January 1922 (aged 81); Worthing, West Sussex, England
- Occupation(s): Journalist, economist, author

William Ramage Lawson (3 December 1840 – 15 January 1922) was a British journalist, economist and author.

== Biography ==
Lawson was born on 3 December 1840, in Kirriemuir, Scotland, to James Lawson (1802–1871) and Margaret Lawson (née Webster) (1814–1870).

Around 1864, he arrived in Adelaide, South Australia, and was employed by pastoralist George Fife Angas as his private secretary. One of his tasks was to prepare for publication Angas's History of the Newcastle upon Tyne Sunday School Union (1869). He was noticed by the editor of the South Australian Register, and offered a position with the paper, which had a reputation for high-quality journalism. Lawson accepted and spent three years with them, during which time his abilities were recognised, and when he announced he was leaving for Europe, hastened on account of his wife's precarious health, his farewells attested to his contribution to the paper and his personal popularity.

He was a prolific writer, though his handwriting was execrable. During his time in Adelaide he also supplied individual essays to The Argus, The Sydney Morning Herald and the Brisbane Courier, and a weekly letter to selected country newspapers. While in Europe, he continued sending copy to The Register, and acted as that paper's correspondent covering the Franco-Prussian War, for which he had the advantage of a fluent knowledge of German. On reaching England he found employment with the London Standard, The Evening News, the Financial News and the Financial Times, which he served as Editor 1890–1891.

He wrote around a dozen books, mostly on economics topics.

He died on 15 January 1922, aged 81, in Worthing, West Sussex, and was buried at the Heene Cemetery in Worthing, West Sussex.

== Family ==
Lawson married Ida Dora Eisenhuth (1836 – 27 May 1889) on 23 May 1864. Their children include:

- James Christian Eisenhuth Lawson (18 July 1865 – 27 May 1926)
- Emil Alexander Webster Lawson (28 May 1867 – )
- Caroline Lawson (7 February 1869 – )
- William Eisenhuth Lawson (19 September 1871 – 17 August 1932)
- Herbert Julius Eisenhuth Lawson (12 Feb 1879 – 6 Oct 1925)

== Publications ==
- Our Wool Staple; or, A History of Squatting in South Australia (1865) Adelaide, John Howell
- British Economics in 1901 (1905) William Blackwood & Sons, London
- The Chances of Canada (1911) Blackwood & Sons Edinburgh
- Modern Wars and War Taxes; A Manual of Military Finance (1912) London: William Blackwood & Sons.
- British Railways : A Financial and Commercial Survey
- British War Finance, 1914-15
- American Finance : Part First.--Domestic
- Spain of To-Day. a Descriptive, Industrial and Financial Survey of the Peninsula, with a Full Account of the Rio Tinto Mines
- Europe After the World War; A Financial and Economic Survey (1921) Financial News Office, London

Most, if not all, of these titles are available as modern facsimile reprints.
