= Zebra (ship) =

Ship built in 1818

History
- Name: Zebra
- Launched: 1818

General characteristics
- Class & type: Full-rigged ship, 3 masts
- Tons burthen: 350 (bm)
- Complement: 16

Zebra was a three-masted ship, built in 1818. On 12 August 1838, Zebra, Dirk Meinerts Hahn, master, departed from Altona, Hamburg on a voyage to Port Misery, South Australia. The ship arrived at its destination on 28 December 1838. On board was a crew of 16 and 188 passengers with their belongings. In addition, the ship carried 100 barrels of pork, 100 barrels of flour, 65 barrels of fresh water, 17 hogsheads of beer and vinegar, 14 barrels of herrings, two boxes of boots and 40,924 bricks.

Two passengers died before the journey began. Furthermore, some passengers were on board several weeks prior to departure, leading to an additional two that perished before reaching open sea. For the time, a relatively low number of passengers, 12, died during the journey at sea. This brought the number of passengers down from 199 leaving Germany to 188 arriving in Adelaide. The last corpse was buried at sea as Zebra was approaching Kangaroo Island. Due to a low tide, the passengers could not disembark until 2 January 1839.

Zebra was the third ship bringing Prussian Lutheran migrants to South Australia, after Bengalee and Prince George. The founders of Hahndorf, South Australia came from these three ships, many from Zebra. On arrival and inspection, the migrants were very pleased and impressed with their newly acquired land and, despite many offers of employment whilst shipboard, stayed together and sought farming land.

Hahndorf was named after Captain Hahn in honour of his efforts in securing good land, his superb interpersonal skills which settled many arguments on ship and his care of his passengers. A literal translation of Hahndorf's name is "rooster-village".

== Voyages ==
- Cuxhaven to New York City – departed 15 September 1836 to 10 November 1836
- Elbe to Hamburg – departed 22 June 1838
- Altona to Port Misery, South Australia – 12 August 1838 to 28 December 1838 Transportation of Prussian immigrants from Kay near Zullichau to South Australia, as well as a cargo of 40,924 bricks.
- Port Misery, South Australia to Batavia – arrived 12 February 1839

== General references ==
- "Ships arriving in South Australia 1838 Archived 17 June 2005 at the Wayback Machine", Pioneers Association of South Australia Archived 20 October 2005 at the Wayback Machine
- "Shipping Arrivals", South Australian Genealogy & Heraldry Society Inc
- "Prince George Archived 25 August 2005 at the Wayback Machine", Private homepage of Graeme Moad Archived 12 March 2007 at the Wayback Machine
- "Captain Dirk Hahn and the "Hahndorf" passengers to South Australia", German Australia, David Nutting
- "Zebra 1839", Private webpages of DIANE CUMMINGS
- "Passenger List Zebra 1839 Archived 22 January 2021 at the Wayback Machine"
