= Johann Friedrich Krummnow =

German-born religious settler in Australia

Johann Krummnow
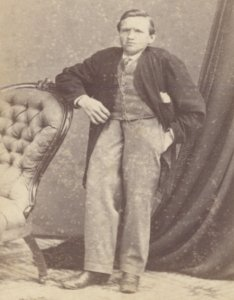
- Born: Johann Friedrich Krummnow; 1811; Posen, Kingdom of Prussia, Germany
- Died: October 1880 (aged 68–69); Penshurst, Victoria, Australia
- Other names: Johann Friedrich Krumnow, J. F. Kromnow
- Occupations: Tailor, preacher
- Known for: Australia's first intentional community based on the principles of shared property and fervent prayer

Johann Friedrich Krummnow (or Krumnow) (1811 – 3 October 1880) was a German-born settler in Australia. He arrived in South Australia in 1839 and in 1852 he founded a community named Herrnhut located near Penshurst in western Victoria. This was Australia's first intentional community based on the principles of shared property and fervent prayer. Krummnow died at Herrnhut in October 1880.

== Arrival in Australia ==
Johann Friedrich Krummnow was born in 1811 in Posen, Kingdom of Prussia, (later known as Poznań, Poland) and was raised in a German community. He worked as a tailor, cobbler and teacher and was an adherent of a variety of the Moravian Brethren within the Lutheran faith. He arrived in Port Adelaide, on 22 January 1839 from Hamburg on the ship, Catharina, with a group of dissidents, 'Kavel's People'. On board ship he taught girls but was deemed "not completely satisfactory and the community did not allow him to teach in Australia". Although thwarted in his ambition to be ordained as a Lutheran pastor, Krummnow held regular prayer meetings in private homes. By 1842 he was a naturalised English citizen and was legally able to purchase land. At Lobethal German settlers provided Krummnow with the funds for land purchases to establish a community: Krummnow wanted it based on his own principles of shared property and fervent prayer. The Lobethal settlers rejected Krummnow's vision and legally disputed his right to the land titles. After 1847 he spent three years as a missionary: living and working with Indigenous Australian communities around Mount Gambier.

Krummnow is described by Theodore Hebart in 1881:

Another disturbing factor of these early days was the activity of the separatist and visionary, Johann Friedrich Krummnow. He was a queer fellow, deformed and gnome-like in appearance, with a positive genius for bobbing up in the places where he was least wanted, sowing the seeds of trouble and mischief wherever he went. Clandestine prayer-meetings in Light's Pass, exorcising of evil spirits, land dealing at Lobethal – these were but some of the side-issues of his main scheme – the realisation of a communistic settlement.

— Theodore Hebart, translated by Johannes Julius Stolz, Vereinigte Evangelisch-Lutherische Kirche in Australien (in English: The United Evangelical Lutheran Church in Australia (U.E.L.C.A.): its history, activities and characteristics, 1838–1938), original in 1881, translation in 1938.

A similar description appeared in the Hamilton Spectator in November 1880:

he was a little, deformed man ... His face was dark and wrinkled, his hair, black, long and unkempt. In public he always wore an overcoat of black cloth and latterly of opossum skin, which, with a broad-crowned German military 'cheesecutter' cap, completed a costume which, as I have said, was characteristic of the man.

— Hamilton Spectator (16 November 1880), p. 4.

Fearing possible excommunication from the Lutheran church for his unorthodox religious views, Krummnow left South Australia.

== Founding of Herrnhut ==
By 1851 Krummnow had moved to the Melbourne suburb of Collingwood where he worked as a tailor, cobbler and preacher. He then moved to Germantown (later called Grovedale), near Geelong, which had been established by Lutherans in 1849. In 1852 a group of German migrants, led by Krummnow, pooled their resources. On 27 May 1853, they purchased 1,584 acres (6.41 km^{2}) of land near Mount Rouse, in western Victoria about 3 miles (4.8 km) north-west from Penshurst. As the leader and a naturalised British subject, the title deeds were in Krummnow's name. The settlers erected a number of stone dwellings, including a church described by the Belfast Gazette in 1857 (reprinted in The Argus) as a "very substantial stone church ... [it] is 60 feet long by 27 feet in width, and the roof is 40 feet from the floor ... cost of the building, we are informed, has been nearly £1,800". The settlement was named Herrnhut – after a Moravian Brethren refuge in Saxony – and numbered less than 40 individuals. The Belfast Gazette further praised "the people, proverbially sober and industrious, are prospering as they deserve to do".

The farm predominantly ran sheep but also had a small number of cattle and horses. Krummnow became an accomplished shearer – giving demonstrations to local farmers. Soon, however, the harmony of the group was interrupted by a dispute about the ownership of the Herrnhut land. Krummnow had made the title of sale in his name alone, despite having used funds from the community to purchase the land. His refusal to change this prompted several members to leave the community and leave with nothing. Other Lutherans in the district were discontent with Krummnow, after his group had purchased some 200 Queensland cattle, "a number of these Lutherans with whips and dogs drove the cattle at a gallop to the Station. The cattle were nearly fat, with the result (that) the whole mob died before morning. The resulting loss was 2000 pounds, a severe blow from which the Moravian never recovered".

Krummnow is part of the area's local folklore and it is often difficult to separate the legend from the man. It is said that his treatment of children was overly strict and often violent. Krummnow believed that medicine was unnecessary and all internal ailments could be cured by prayer alone. In May 1864 at the inquest into the death of one of his followers, George Karger, Krummnow described the group's beliefs:

I am a Moravian minister. Deceased was a member of the society here. When he was taken ill, we did not send for a doctor, as our religious principles do not authorize the calling in of medical aid for any internal complaints. We would do so for a broken limb or an external wound. If we had sent for a doctor in the present case, we would have been breaking the laws of our church and the rules of the society ... I do not believe that a doctor or medicine can prolong life; it cannot be proved.

— J. F. Krumnow [sic], Hamilton Spectator quoted in The Argus, 24 May 1864, p. 5.

Herrnhut opened its doors to impoverished and destitute peoples as well as providing shelter, food and money for Indigenous Australian communities in times of crisis. At one stage Herrnhut "gave sanctuary to over three hundred aborigines who hunted kangaroos on the property and left many middens at their camping ground".

== Maria Heller ==
One of the most significant events in Herrnhut's history is the arrival of Maria Heller, a self-styled prophetess who had set up a similar community at Hills Plain near Benalla, Victoria in early 1875. The Hills Plain commune failed in its first year, eight of its members (among them children) dying of famine and other related ailments. Krummnow offered to bring Heller's people to Herrnhut, which he did late that year in two convoys of wagons. In March 1876 the South Australian Register reported that Krummnow had agreed "to pay all their debts and to regulate their affairs, under the condition of their joining his community, and of entering into the bosom of his Church". Some accounts recall Heller as a wild woman possessed of an uneven temper, whose followers brought discontent to the austere Herrnhut community. In August 1876 police arrested Heller "as a dangerous lunatic ... suffering from religious mania" upon complaint by one of the Herrnhut residents. One unsubstantiated source tells of how the Hills Plain people introduced musical instruments and dance into the community. In a short time, a rift was apparent between the old and new settlers, and by late that year, Heller and her followers left. Heller settled 23 kilometres (14 mi) away in Hochkirch (now Tarrington) and married a fellow Hills Plain and Herrnhut resident, Ernst Scholtz.

Krummnow is said to have never fully recovered from Heller's rejection of his beliefs, and spent his remaining days under the influence of alcohol. Johann Friedrich Krummnow died intestate on 3 October 1880, leaving £5,826 18s 11d. After his death, the local folklore records that he was buried face-down so as to prevent his soul from rising to Heaven. This unsubstantiated claim is almost certainly false – Krummnow's eulogy was delivered by August Hildebrandt, the settlement's baker and a long-term adherent – attendees at the funeral were his friends and followers.

In April 1885 The Argus correspondent, 'The Vagabond' (S James), described Herrnhut and its founder according to the observations of local farmers, John and Thomas Hutton: "Krumnow was a German Slav by birth, shoemaker by profession, Socialist by opinion" and "He ruled the community by fear and not by love, although he exercised the rights of free love. He was a dissipated Brigham Young or John Humphreys Noyes. Yet not by any means all bad. Certainly the church, and the school, and the dam, and the farm show that Krumnow had an idea at the start of directing his people to lead religious and useful lives. But the strain of the power with which he became possessed, and the opportunities of self indulgence, overcame his impulses or theories for good". According to Charles Meyer in the Victorian Historical Journal (1978), "[f]rom available evidence there is no need, to accept the rather biased description by 'Vagabond' (S. James) that the women and young girls 'toiled in the fields early and late, some clothed only in an old sack – toiled as hard as any negro slave'". Vagabond's view is also disputed by William Metcalf and Betty Huf in their 2002 book, Herrnhut: Australia's First Utopian Commune, "[Herrnhut's] strong, charismatic leader, Johann Krumnow, and the 'peculiar' ways of the communards led to their vilification by the press as a wicked cult, full of sexual deviance and other misdemeanors [sic]. In truth they established a safe haven for Aborigines, a refuge for homeless people, and one of Australia's first woman's shelters, as well as a system for efficiently managing a large farm and supporting nearly fifty people". The Herrnhut community struggled on after Krummnow's death for some years until, with eight members left, it dissipated in 1889. Partial ruins of the church and other buildings still remain.

== Media ==
A book about Krummnow and the Herrnhut community was written in 2002, Herrnhut: Australia's First Utopian Commune, by William Metcalf and Betty Huf. It is currently out of print. On 26 February 2003 Australian Broadcasting Corporation's Radio National transmitted "Herrnhut" on Ark Stories with the presenter, Rachael Kohn, interviewing Metcalf about the settlement, Krummnow and some of the mistakes early settlers made in rural areas.
