= Skjold Church =

Skjold Church may refer to:

- Skjold Church, Bergen, a church in Bergen municipality, Vestland county, Norway
- Skjold Church, Rogaland, a church in Vindafjord municipality, Rogaland county, Norway
