= Charles Flaxman =

Australian settler

Charles Flaxman (25 December 1806 – November 1869) was employed by George Angas as his confidential clerk. He was a scholar of the German language, and conducted all the negotiations with Angas's emigrants who were fleeing religious persecution of their native country. He travelled to Australia aboard the Prince George in 1838, accompanying 200 Prussian immigrants.

He was an early beneficiary of the special survey scheme, using his power of attorney to draw on Angas's line of credit for speculation in land in the region of Meadows. Fortune smiled on his impertinence, and he became immensely wealthy, eventually being forgiven for his presumptuousness.

He took up land in Tanunda. The Flaxman Valley in the area is named after him. In 1839 he returned to England, where he became chairman of the South Australian Statistical Society. He later returned to South Australia, where he lost heavily in mining ventures and was forced to declare bankruptcy.

His death was reported as 9 November 1869.

== Sources ==
- "Prince George (dep Hamburg) 1838"
- C. H. Bright (1983). The confidential clerk: A study of Charles Flaxman in South Australia and his relationship with George Fife Angas. E. H. Bright. ISBN 0-9591215-0-1.
- Michael Kassler, 'Charles Flaxman's Contribution to Musicology', The Musical Times vol. 165 no. 1968 (autumn 2024), pp. 57–60'}
