= Dirk Meinerts Hahn =

German ship captain

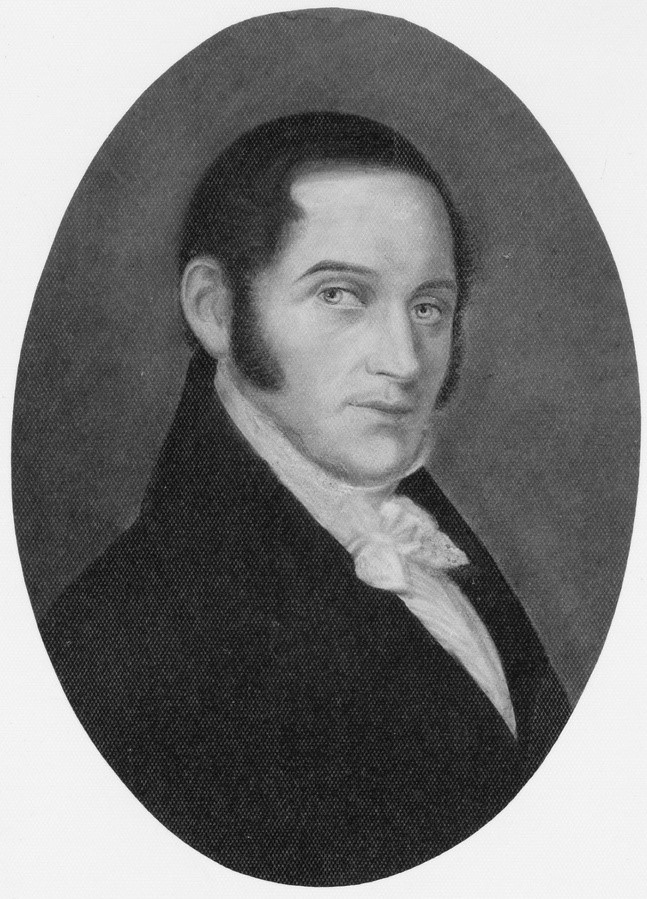

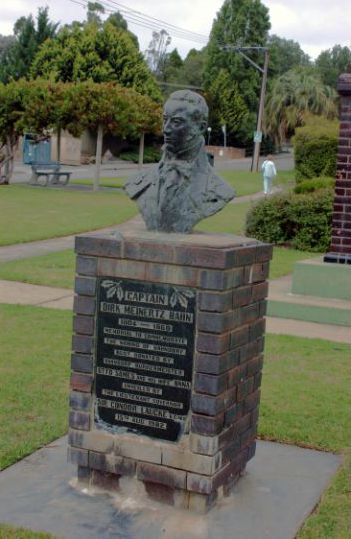
Monument to Hahn in Hahndorf

Captain Dirk Meinerts Hahn, sometimes spelt Dirk Meinertz Hahn (born 1804 in Westerland, Sylt, died 1860) was the captain of the ship Zebra that he captained to South Australia where the town of Hahndorf was named after him. A monument dedicated to him in Hahndorf was unveiled in 1939.
