= Hahndorf, South Australia =

Hahndorf Peramangk: Bukartilla
- Town
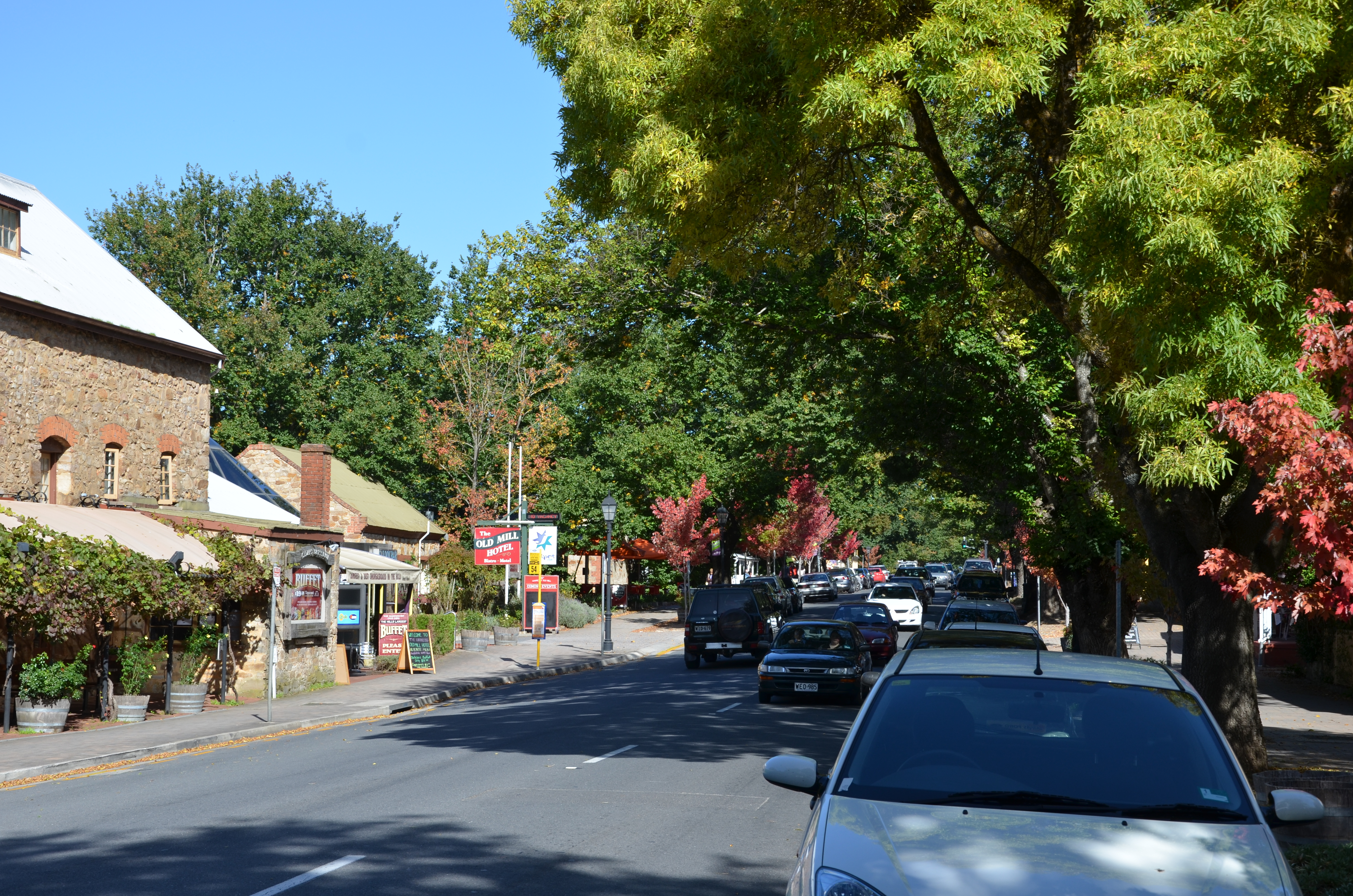
- Hahndorf main street

- Coordinates: 35°01′49″S 138°48′28″E
- Country: Australia
- State: South Australia
- LGAs: District Council of Mount Barker; Adelaide Hills Council
- Location: 28 km (17 mi) from Adelaide's CBD; 7 km (4.3 mi) from Mount Barker
- Established: 1839

Government
  - State electorate: Heysen
  - Federal division: Mayo

Population
  - Total: 2,313 (UCL 2021)
- Postcode: 5245
Localities around Hahndorf
| Bridgewater | Verdun | Balhannah |
| Mylor | Hahndorf | Totness |
| Biggs Flat | Echunga | Paechtown |

Hahndorf (German: [ˈhaːnˌdɔʁf]; Peramangk: Bukartilla) is a small town in the Adelaide Hills region of South Australia. Currently an important tourism spot, it has previously been a centre for farming and services.

== History ==
The town was settled on the traditional land of the Peramangk people by Lutheran migrants largely from and around a small village then named Kay in Prussia and now known as Kije, Lubusz Voivodeship in Poland. The traditional name of the site on which Hahndorf is situated is Bukartilla, in reference to the local water holes. Many of the settlers arrived aboard Zebra on 28 December 1838. The town is named after Dirk Meinerts Hahn, the captain of Zebra. It is Australia's oldest surviving German settlement.

=== Early German settlers ===
During the British colonisation of South Australia, the settlers were mostly British, but some German "Old Lutherans" also emigrated in the early years. The first large group of Germans arrived in 1838, with the financial assistance of the Emigration Fund. By 1842 most had moved out of Adelaide to the Barossa Valley and settlements in the Adelaide Hills, such as Hahndorf, living in socially closed communities without participating in government until 15 years later.

=== German influence ===
German influence is apparent in Hahndorf and is seen in the traditional timber framed (Fachwerk) architecture of the original surviving buildings. There are also many restaurants in the town serving German cuisine. Protecting and enhancing heritage, and building on this German identity, is one of the guiding principles of the township plan endorsed by the District Council of Mount Barker in 2018.

Due to the First World War in Europe, in 1917 the South Australian Government changed many German place names. The name Hahndorf was changed to Ambleside after the nearby Ambleside railway station. Hahndorf was re-instated as the town's name with the enactment of the South Australia Nomenclature Act of 1935 on 12 December 1935. There are still references to the name Ambleside in and around the town today.

== Demographics ==
Hahndorf population by year
| 2006 | 1,806 |
| 2016 | 2,670 |

At the census 2006 the population was 1,806. In 2016 the population was 2,670.

== Government ==
Located in the federal division of Mayo, the state electoral district of Heysen, and the local government areas of the District Council of Mount Barker and the Adelaide Hills Council.

== Churches ==
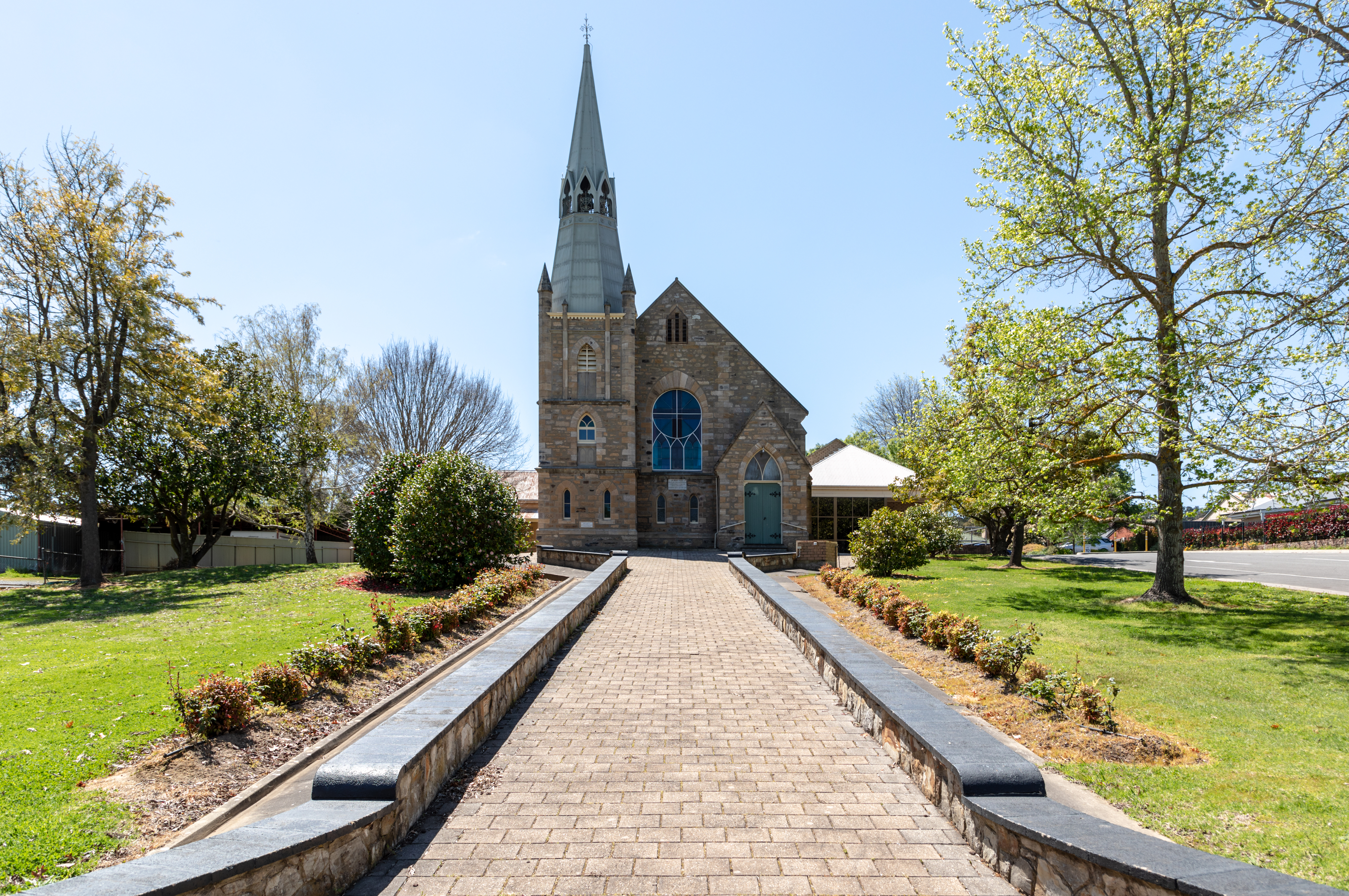
St Paul's Lutheran Church

There are two prominent churches in Hahndorf. St Michael's is the oldest Lutheran church in Australia to still have a worshipping congregation on its original church site. It was founded in 1839. St Michael's is a member of the Lutheran Church of Australia. St Paul's was founded in 1846, as a result of a schism between Pastor Kavel and Pastor Fritzsche. This schism is closely linked to the formation of two original Lutheran synods in Australia which coexisted until their merger in 1966.

=== C3 Adelaide Hills ===
C3 Adelaide Hills is a church of the C3 Church Global movement. Previously located in Nairne, it moved to Hahndorf around 2007.

== Geography ==
Hahndorf is accessible from Adelaide, the South Australian capital, via the South Eastern Freeway.

== Climate ==
Hahndorf has a warm-summer Mediterranean climate abbreviated Csb on the Köppen climate classification scale.

Climate data for Hahndorf
| Month | Jan | Feb | Mar | Apr | May | Jun | Jul | Aug | Sep | Oct | Nov | Dec | Year |
|---|---|---|---|---|---|---|---|---|---|---|---|---|---|
| Mean daily maximum °C (°F) | 28.0 (82.4) | 28.0 (82.4) | 25.0 (77.0) | 21.0 (69.8) | 17.0 (62.6) | 14.0 (57.2) | 13.0 (55.4) | 15.0 (59.0) | 17.0 (62.6) | 20.0 (68.0) | 23.0 (73.4) | 25.0 (77.0) | 20.5 (68.9) |
| Daily mean °C (°F) | 20.5 (68.9) | 20.0 (68.0) | 18.0 (64.4) | 15.0 (59.0) | 12.0 (53.6) | 9.5 (49.1) | 9.0 (48.2) | 10.0 (50.0) | 11.5 (52.7) | 14.0 (57.2) | 17.0 (62.6) | 18.0 (64.4) | 14.5 (58.2) |
| Mean daily minimum °C (°F) | 13.0 (55.4) | 12.0 (53.6) | 11.0 (51.8) | 9.0 (48.2) | 7.0 (44.6) | 5.0 (41.0) | 5.0 (41.0) | 5.0 (41.0) | 6.0 (42.8) | 8.0 (46.4) | 9.0 (48.2) | 11.0 (51.8) | 8.4 (47.2) |
| Average rainfall mm (inches) | 24.2 (0.95) | 21.8 (0.86) | 30.4 (1.20) | 54.2 (2.13) | 73.0 (2.87) | 89.5 (3.52) | 108.5 (4.27) | 101.6 (4.00) | 82.5 (3.25) | 55.8 (2.20) | 33.6 (1.32) | 38.6 (1.52) | 713.7 (28.09) |
| Average rainy days | 3 | 2 | 4 | 6 | 9 | 11 | 12 | 13 | 10 | 7 | 5 | 5 | 87 |
Source: NOAA.

== Sports ==
Hahndorf's sporting clubs including basketball, bowls, netball, cricket, football (Australian rules and Association Football), tennis and softball. The football (both codes), netball and softball clubs are nicknamed the Magpies.

The Hahndorf Bowling Club was established in 1976 and has a full size (nine rink) green, which is a woven carpet surface enabling all weather competition, and a large clubhouse.

The football (soccer) club was formed in the early 1980s and plays home games at Pine Avenue. The senior men compete in the South Australian Amateur Soccer League. They won the 1996 Newsfront Cup and the 2004 Amateur League Division Two title. However, a gradual decline in player numbers from 2013 has seen the side drop to one team, competing in Division Seven, by 2019.

Hahndorf was the start point of the 2024 Women's Tour Down Under.

== Notable residents ==
- Watercolour artist Hans Heysen established "The Cedars" close to the town in 1912. He lived and painted there until his death in 1968. "The Cedars" remains in his family, and is open for guided tours.
- Matthew Jaensch was an AFL footballer who played for the Adelaide Crows. He retired in 2016 after six years and 74 games with the Crows.

== Gallery ==
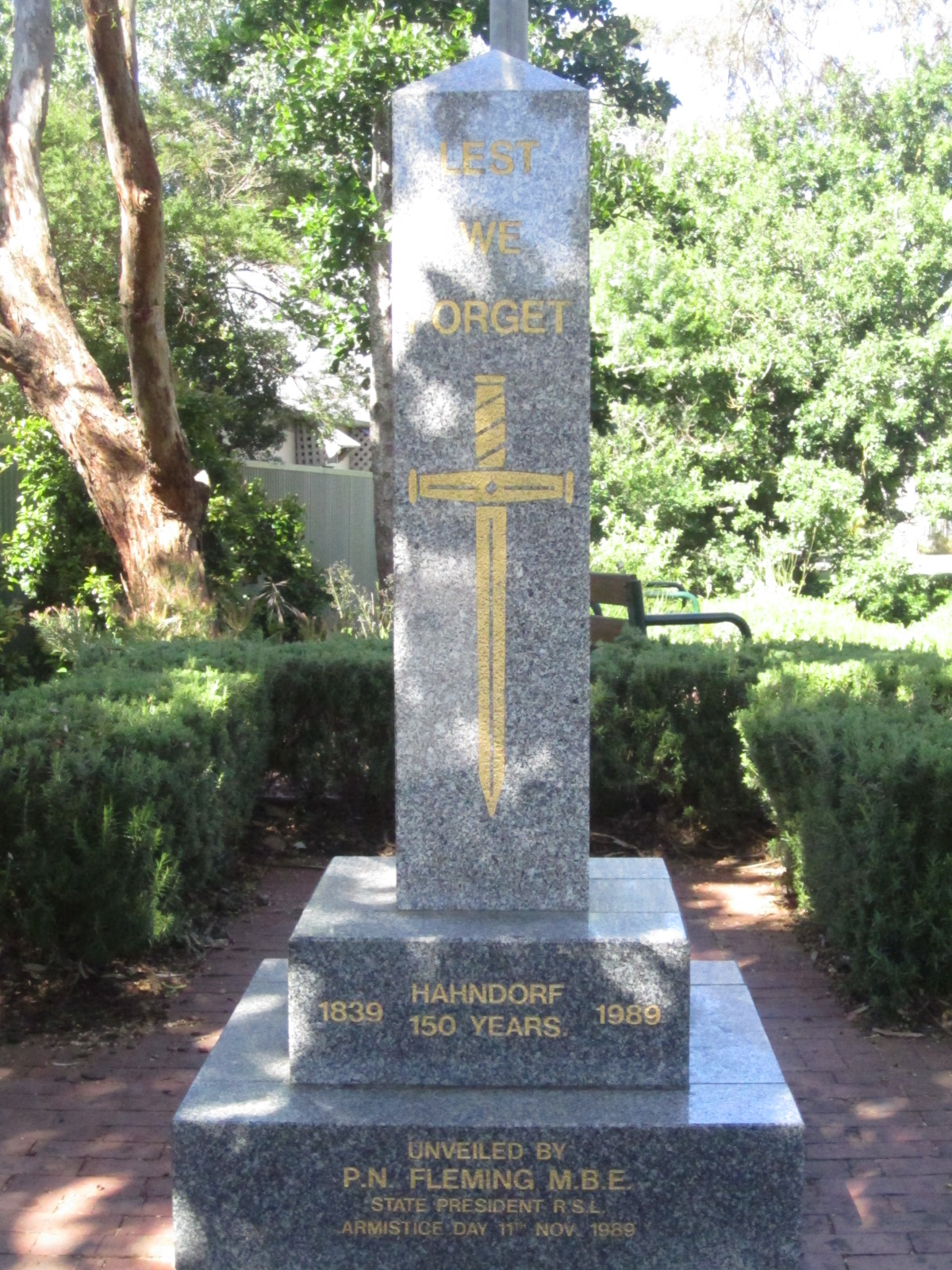
150th anniversary memorial

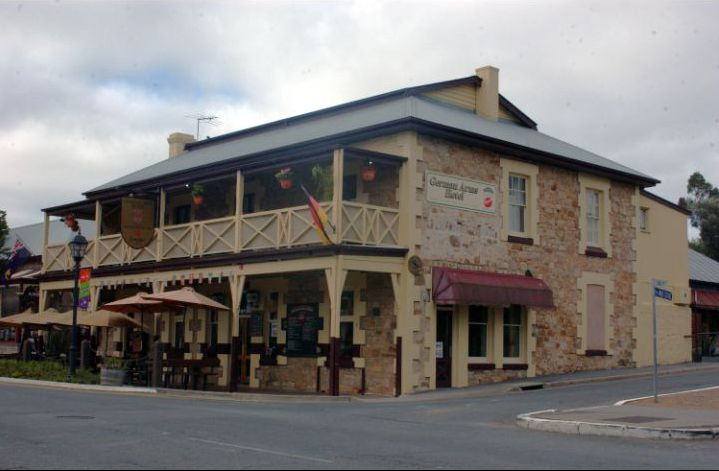
German Arms Hotel

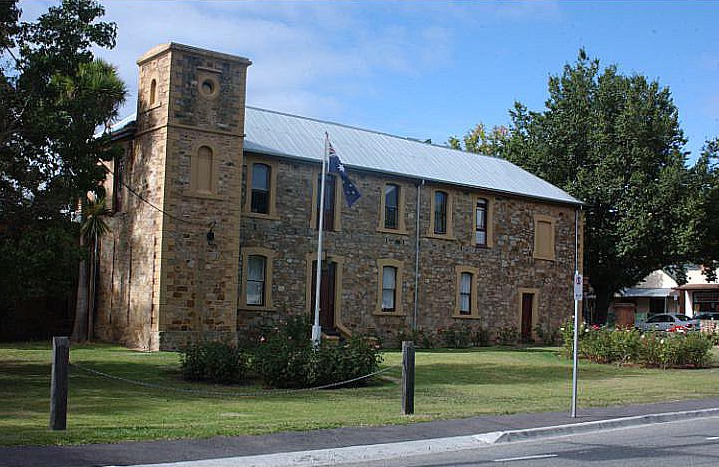
Hahndorf Academy

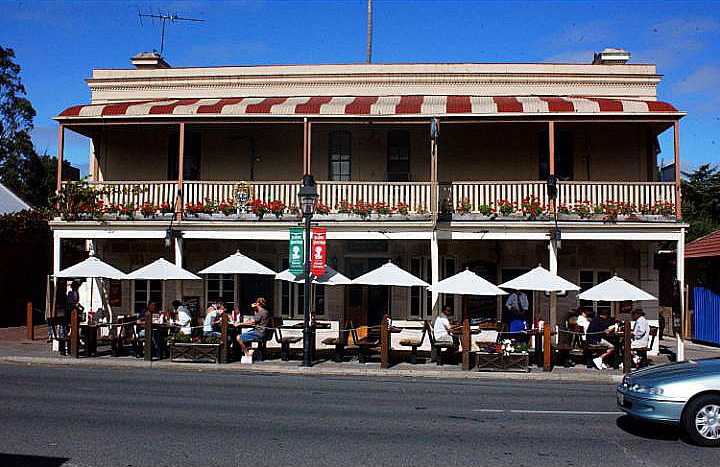
Hahndorf Inn

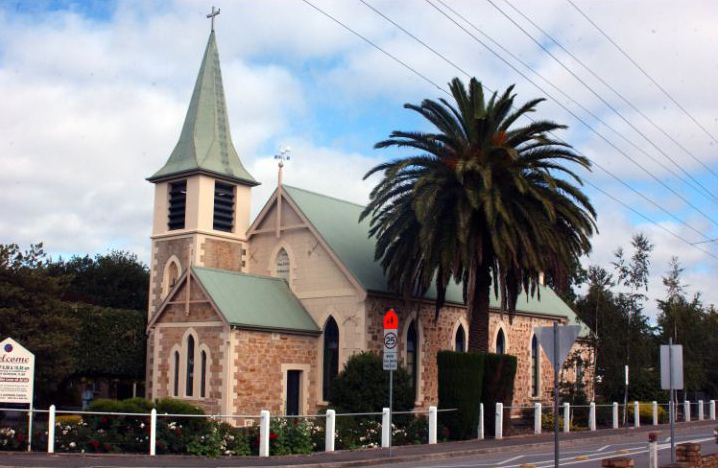
St Michael's Lutheran Church

Drive along Hahndorf's main street

== See also ==
- German Australians
- Danish Australians
- Polish Australians

== Sources ==
- Mount Barker District Council (2 December 2025). "Township Plan". Mount Barker District Council.
