= Catharina (ship) =

German barque

The Catharina was a barque, built 1810 in Kiel, and weighing 350 tons.

== Voyages ==
- Hamburg to Port Adelaide, South Australia - 21 September 1838 to 20 January 1839
  - On board were a group of Lutheran dissidents, 'Kavel's People', including Johann Friedrich Krummnow, which wanted to form a community in Australia. En route Krummnow taught the girls but was deemed "not completely satisfactory and the community did not allow him to teach in Australia".
- Port Adelaide, South Australia to Batavia - departed 27 February 1839

== Notes ==
- "Ships arriving in South Australia 1838", Pioneers Association of South Australia
- "Shipping Arrivals", South Australian Genealogy & Heraldry Society Inc
- "Catharina", Private homepage of Graeme Moad
- "Captain Dirk Hahn and the "Hahndorf" passengers to South Australia Archived 2005-07-05 at the Wayback Machine", German Australia, David Nutting
- "Catharina 1839", Private webpages of DIANE CUMMINGS
