= Prince George (1828 ship) =

History

United Kingdom
- Name: Prince George
- Builder: William Wright, North Shields
- Launched: 27 May 1828
- Fate: Wrecked July 1841

General characteristics
- Tons burthen: 317 (bm)
- Length: 96 ft (29 m)
- Beam: 32 ft 7 in (9.9 m)
- Depth of hold: 5 ft 6 in (1.7 m)
- Sail plan: Three-masted barque

Prince George was launched in 1828 at Newcastle upon Tyne. She was an East Indiaman, initially sailing under a license from the British East India Company (EIC). She made two voyages to South Australia, carrying 200 Prussian immigrants on the first. She was wrecked in July 1841 near Hong Kong.

== Career ==
Captain Henry Wright, of South Shields, acquired Prince George on 27 May 1828. He moved to London in 1829 and transferred Prince George's registry from Newcastle to London.

In 1813 the EIC had lost its monopoly on the trade between India and Britain. British ships were then free to sail to India or the Indian Ocean under a license from the EIC. Prince George first appeared in Lloyd's Register (LR) in 1830 with Donaldson, master, Wright, owner, and trade London–Ceylon. In 1835 Henry Wright moved back to Newcastle. Prince George was registered there on 6 January 1835.

Year	Master	Owner	Trade	Source
1835	T.Shaw	Francis	London–Bombay	LR
1840	G.Chilcott	H.Wright	London–Ceylon	LR; damages repaired 1837

On 31 July 1838 Captain Frederick Bigger Chilcott sailed from Hamburg, bound for Port Adelaide. She was under charter to George Fife Angas's South Australia Company. She arrived at Port Adelaide on 18 November. She was transporting 207 passengers, consisting of Germans, including Pastor August Kavel, plus seven others (four adults and three children). The Germans were the first Prussian settlers to South Australia.

Prince George made a second voyage to South Australia. She sailed from Calcutta on 12 May 1839 and arrived at Nepean Bay, South Australia on 2 September 1839.

== Fate ==
On 21 August 1841 a typhoon developed at Macao and Hong Kong. Price George went to pieces but her crew was saved and taken aboard Queen.
