= Skjold (1839 ship) =

History
- Owner: C. Petersen

General characteristics
- Sail plan: three-masted barque

The Skjold (or Skiold) was a Danish three-mast Barque, built in Sønderborg 1839, and displacing 460 tons. It was owned by C. Petersen, Sønderborg.

== Captains ==
- Hans Christian Claussen

== Voyages ==
- Altona to Port Adelaide, South Australia – 3 July 1841 to 28 October 1841 with Prussian immigrants including Pastor Gotthard Fritzsche
- Port Adelaide, South Australia to Batavia – departed 22 November 1841
- Hamburg to Nelson, New Zealand – 21 April 1844 to 1 September 1844 with German immigrants.
- Hamburg to New York City – arrived 16 June 1846 with 177 German immigrants, most settled in Niagara County, New York.
