= Klępsk =

- Village
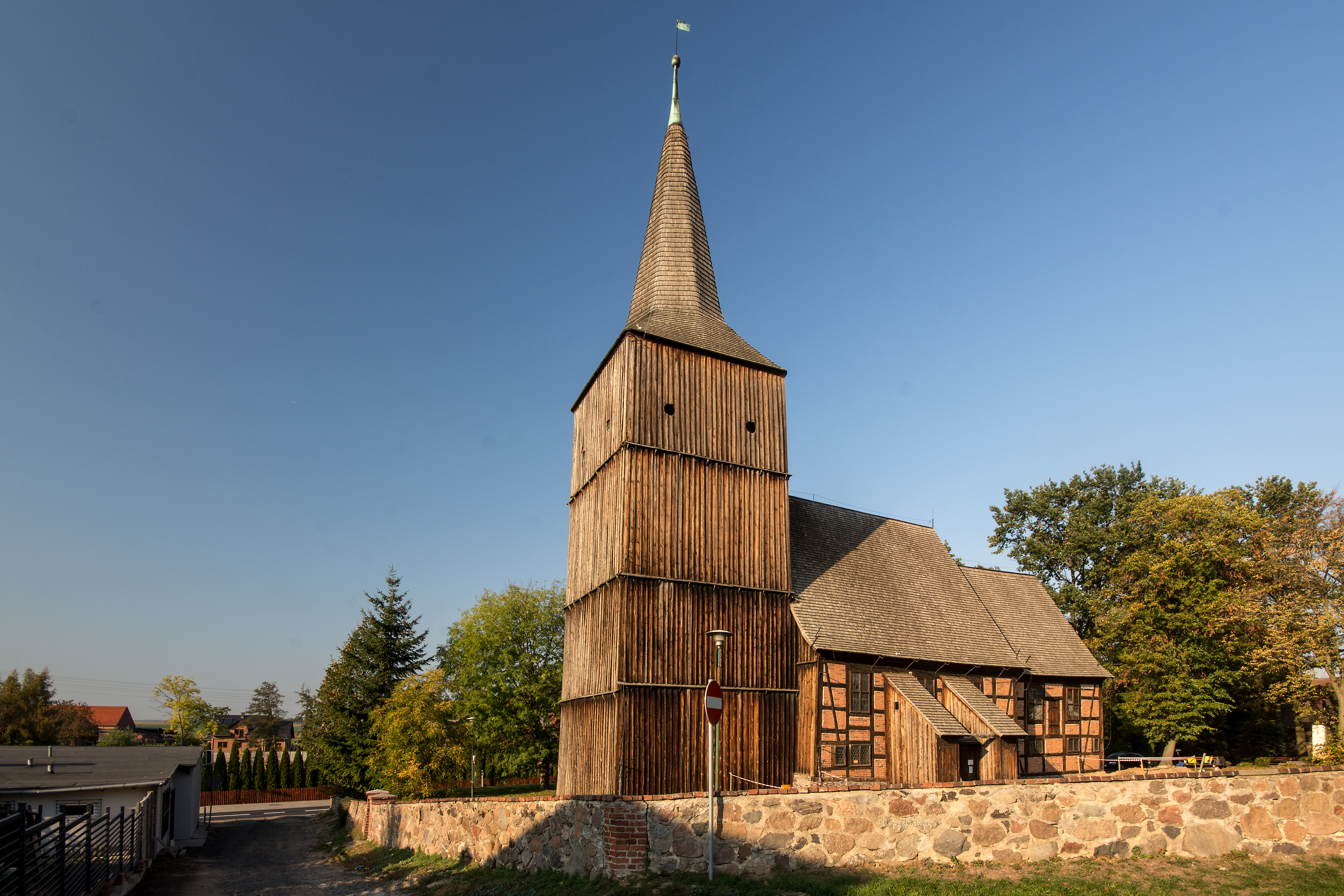
- Church of the Visitation of Mary in Klępsk

- Location within Poland
- Coordinates: 52°6′N 15°43′E
- Country: Poland
- Voivodeship: Lubusz
- County: Zielona Góra
- Gmina: Sulechów

Population
  - Total: 520
- Time zone: UTC+1 (CET)
  - Summer (DST): UTC+2 (CEST)
- Vehicle registration: FZI
- Primary airport: Zielona Góra Airport

Klępsk ([klɛmpsk]; German: Klemzig) is a village in the administrative district of Gmina Sulechów, within Zielona Góra County, Lubusz Voivodeship, in western Poland.

The local landmark is the Church of the Visitation of the Holy Virgin Mary, which is listed as a Historic Monument of Poland.

== History ==
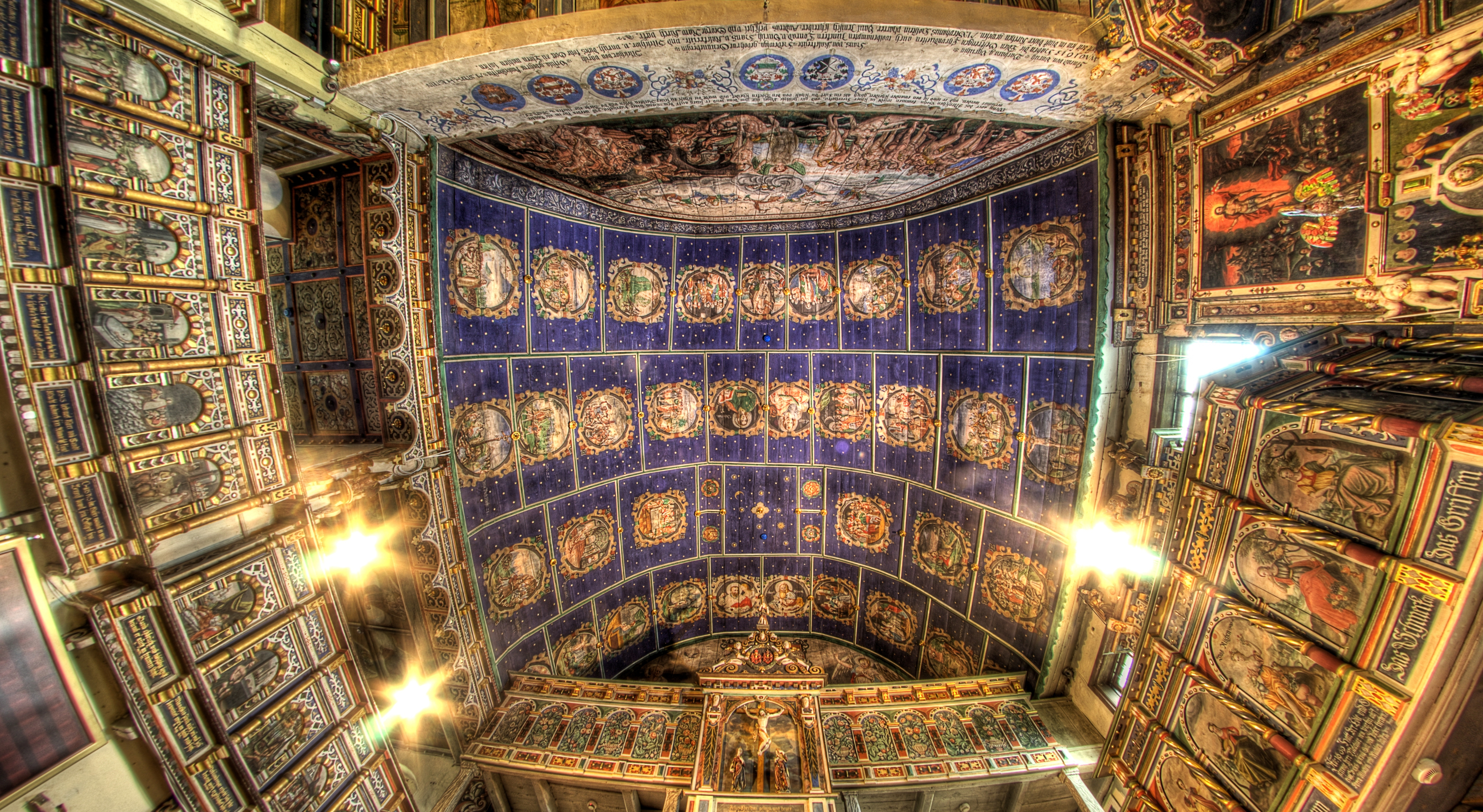
Interior of the Church of the Visitation

In the 10th century, the area became part of the emerging Polish state under its first historic ruler Mieszko I. Since 1138, it formed part of the Duchy of Silesia, a provincial duchy of Poland, and later it also belonged to the Duchy of Głogów. In 1482, it fell to the Margraviate of Brandenburg, as a fief of Bohemia (Czechia). From 1701 it was a part of the Kingdom of Prussia, and from 1871 it was also part of Germany, within which it was administratively located in the province of Brandenburg. Following Germany's defeat in World War II in 1945, the area became again part of Poland.

In the 19th century the village was a center of the Old Lutheran movement, whose members refused to join the state-sponsored Prussian Union (Evangelical Christian Church) and suffered persecution. Some of the local Old Lutherans immigrated to Australia where they founded the village of Klemzig, South Australia.
