= Bengalee (ship) =

1837 merchant barque

History

United Kingdom
- Name: Bengalee
- Port of registry: Greenock:3 June 1837; Whitehaven:1840
- Builder: Archibald P McFarlane Jnr & Co., Dumbarton
- Launched: 1837
- Fate: Wrecked 23 October 1851

General characteristics
- Tons burthen: Old Act: 304 (bm); New Act (post 1836): 354 (bm)
- Length: 101 ft 2 in (30.8 m)
- Beam: 23 ft 0 in (7.0 m)
- Depth: 17 ft 7 in (5.4 m)

Bengalee was a three-masted merchant barque built in 1837 at Dumbarton. She first appeared in Lloyd's Register (LR) in 1838 with Hamlin, master, Hamlin and Company, of Greenock, owners, and trade Clyde–Calcutta. Captain Thomas Hamlin did not allow the consumption of alcohol on his ship, thus it was known as a temperance ship.

== Voyages ==
- Hamburg to Port Adelaide, South Australia. Bengalee left Hamburg on 16 July 1838 and stopped at the Downs. She arrived at Kingscote, South Australia on 9 November and at Port Adelaide on 16 November. Although primarily carrying supplies, she also carried 27 passengers, among whom were a group of the first Prussian settlers to Australia. From Port Adelaide she sailed on 29 February 1839 to Batavia.
- Calcutta to Liverpool – arrived 16 December 1839
- ??? to Sydney – arrived 26 June 1840
- Hobart Town to Canton – arrived 3 November 1843

== Fate ==
Bengalee was driven ashore on 23 October 1851 and broke her back at Saugor. Her crew abandoned her. She was on a voyage from Calcutta to Genoa, Kingdom of Sardinia.
