= German Club, Adelaide =

Cultural club in Adelaide, South Australia

New clubhouse design 1878 by George R. Johnson architect

There have been a number of organisations known as the German Club in Adelaide, South Australia. The two most notable ones are:

- The Adelaide German Club (Deutsche Club or Deutscher Club in the German-language newspapers) was founded in 1854 and disbanded in 1909. It had premises at 89 Pirie Street.
- The German Club is a venue owned by the South Australian German Association, which was founded in 1886 as the Südaustralischer Allgemeiner Deutscher Verein (SAADV). After over a century in Flinders Street in Adelaide's CBD, the club moved to Brooklyn Park in 2019. This association runs the annual Schützenfest.

== Background ==
German immigrants came to Australia in several waves:

- The first wave of migration was a reaction to Kaiser Friedrich Wilhelm III's edict that all Lutheran churches follow the New Liturgy, and rather than comply, many pastors and their followers left for the settled lands of America or the fresh fields of Australia, particularly South Australia. Most were farmers, farm workers and tradesmen, who had left the Fatherland with young families and sufficient assets to cover the inevitable business or farm losses in the first year or so. Pastor Kavel and his followers exemplify this wave of migration from the mid-1830s to mid-1840s. They settled in Klemzig, Hahndorf, Lobethal, Tanunda and other areas, and by hard work, thrift and their policy of diversified farming, they prospered. Few had English language skills, and they formed tight-knit communities who only needed to communicate with the outside world in the buying and selling of commodities.
- Friedrich Wilhelm III died in 1840 and religious persecution abated. Then came the Revolutions of 1848, and a different class of refugee: political rather than religious; skilled artisans, merchants and professionals to a large degree, exemplified perhaps by Rev. Carl Muecke, who had made himself vulnerable by his political activism. Known as "Forty-Eighters", many settled in Adelaide and outlying towns such as Gawler, prospered. and encouraged friends and relations with needed skills to join them. English language skills were an important tool for this class of migrant, and many became naturalized British subjects.
- A third wave of migrants left Germany for economic reasons: with few skills and little education they had been left behind in the industrialization of the country, the first to be retrenched in times of recession and the last to be rehired, they saw South Australia as a chance for well-paid employment and their own plot of land. Many of those who arrived after the 1871 Unification of Germany were intensely proud of their resurgent country; their loud nationalism was to bring other German settlers, with no sympathy for the old country, under suspicion during the Great War, and a terrible loss of their civil liberties.

The church was the first and most important focus of community life, but many had a need for a social and cultural life away from the Church. The German Club was formed, deliberately, to cater for educated Germans who wished to retain and foster German language and high culture in their new land.

=== Clubs ===
The term "German Club" was frequently invoked in the early days of South Australia, referring to the universal feeling among those German immigrants who applied for and were granted naturalisation as British subjects; "...all the rights and capacities of British-born subjects..." but found they were ineligible to vote or nominate for the Legislative Council. Rev. Carl Muecke, Frederick Basedow and Richard Schomburgk were leaders in the demand for reform.

Early organisations to which German immigrants specifically belonged include the Macclesfield United English and German Rifle Club (1851), German Rifle Club (1853), German Glee Club, and several Liedertafels, notably Adelaide and Tanunda. Several German-language newspapers appeared, notably the Südaustralische Zeitung in 1849.

== Adelaide German Club ==
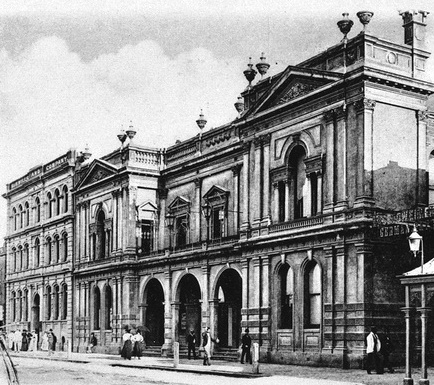
German Club, Pirie Street, Adelaide

The Adelaide German Club was founded on 15 July 1854 by C. Kraegen, F. Schumacher, J. Drechsler, A. Beyer, G. Kopsch, F. May, C. Praehm, J. M. Wendt, J. A. Senn, O. Ziegler, C. Gunther and Uhlmann. One service the German Club provided its members was a Sick Fund, which 1868 became a separate organisation.

After twenty years of holding meetings in hotels (they rented a hall upstairs in the Hamburg Hotel in Rundle Street, then the Europe Hotel, Grenfell Street (each at an intersection with Gawler Place), they had saved enough money to purchased a large allotment, part or all of 87–91 Pirie Street, and in 1878 started building their own magnificent clubhouse at 89 Pirie Street,. The lower level of the building was made of Manoora stone. Plans for the new club building included a large theatre with stage and balcony, with seating for 1,500; a meeting room, accommodating 400 people; and bedrooms for visitors from the country. Construction commenced in January 1878 and the building was opened in July 1879.

They then embarked on construction behind the clubhouse, of Adelaide's Albert Hall, a large concert hall named for the Prince Consort, which was officially opened on 4 October 1880. This has been described as the point at which the club's fortunes began to nosedive. It had cost a little over £2,000, and was entirely paid for by fund-raising activities, and through every member contributing £1, which was to be repaid, interest-free, out of profits. The scheme backfired however: membership dropped dramatically and the focus of those remaining was on repaying the debt, to the detriment of their social and cultural program.

From around 1890 maintenance of the Albert Hall was neglected and at a special general meeting held by the German Freehold Company, Ltd., owners on behalf of the club, accepted the offer of £4,000 by the Salvation Army for the property. From January 1899 the Club met in a house owned by Patrick Gay (the cabinetmaker of Gay's Arcade fame) in Grenfell Street.

The German Club predominantly consisted of the "upper crust" of German society, living in North Adelaide and Walkerville, steeped in fine German literature and classical music, socialising with and even marrying British settlers of the same social strata, and making the club accessible to cultured British Australians. They loosened their ties to the Lutheran Church, and sent their children to parochial schools. Many of their "leading lights" found membership of the Adelaide Club more beneficial to their social and business success, and left the German Club.

The club wound up in 1909.

=== Presidents ===
(Incomplete)

- 1858 Friedrich Schumacher
- 1867 Friedrich Krichauff
- 1869–1870 C. Balk
- 1870–1871 G. Meyer
- 1874 Adolph Witt
- 1874–1880 Ernst Postkuchen
- 1880 Theodor Scherk
- 1890–1891 Oskar Ziegler (c. 1832 – 20 August 1916)
- 1898–1899 H. Nettlebeck
- 1904 Otto von Drehnen
- 1908 A. H. Peek

== South Australian German Association ==
The Südaustralischer Allgemeiner Deutscher Verein (SAADV), later South Australian German Association, was founded in 1886 as a direct competitor to the Adelaide German Club. It appealed to the working and artisan classes who lived in the city and near suburbs in generally working class areas which in the main consisted of small attached houses in the east end of Adelaide. The Association concentrated on social evenings and folk culture, as exemplified by the Schützenfest. The Association, as the Club before it, was opposed by the Lutheran Church who saw clubs as secular and godless and the association with its initial socialist leanings were against the conservative traditions of the Church.

The first Schützenfest held by the Association was held was held in the suburb of Walkerville on 30 December 1889, and it also ran the event in Hahndorf from 1964 to 1994, after which it was moved to Adelaide, taking place in Bonython Park in the western parklands.

The Association ran the German Club venue in Flinders Street in the city from the early 20th century, until the building was sold in 2019 for $3.5 million in order to pay off its debts. The German Club was open to the public as a restaurant, and was also used as an Adelaide Fringe venue.

The German Club relocated to Brooklyn Park, and remains open to non-members as a restaurant and a pub.

Membership of the Association/Club rose from 170 in 1950 to 2,000 in 1986; a result of the large post-war intake after 1952. However numbers declined to 1,000 by 1995 and to 893 by 2003.

== Other German clubs in Adelaide ==
Two other organisations, like the Adelaide German Club, catered for the "upper crust" class: the insular Club Teutonia (1889–1938) was more reactionary, and the Fortschrittsverein (Progress Association) more cultured.

== See also ==
- German Club, Sydney
- German settlement in Australia
