= German Australians =

Ethnic group

German Australians Deutsch-Australier

Total population
- 1,026,138 (by ancestry, 2021) (4% of the Australian population); 107,940 (by birth, 2021)

Regions with significant populations
- All states and territories of Australia, in particular South Australia and Queensland

Languages
- Australian English, German, Barossa German

Religion
- Christianity (Lutheranism, Catholicism), Judaism, other.

German Australians (German: Deutsch-Australier) are Australians of German ancestry. They constitute one of the largest ancestry groups in Australia, and German is the fifth most identified European ancestry in Australia behind English, Irish, Scottish and Italian. German Australians are one of the largest groups within the global German diaspora, and are a large part of Australia's multicultural background. (Note: Hahndorf for example is one of the most significant tourist areas.)

== History ==
	No. of arrivals July 1949 – June 2000	July 1940 – June 1959 (Note: Department of Immigration and Multicultural Affairs: "Settler arrivals by birthplace data not available prior to 1959. For the period July 1949 to June 1959, Permanent and Long Term Arrivals by Country of Last Residence have been included as a proxy for this data. When interpreting this data for some countries, in the period immediately after World War II, there were large numbers of displaced persons whose country of last residence was not necessarily the same as their birthplace.")	July 1959 – June 1970 (Note: Note this period covers 11 years rather than a decade.)
Immigrant arrivals from Germany	255,930	162,756	50,452
Total immigrant arrivals	5,640,638	1,253,083	1,445,356
Percentage of immigrants from Germany	4.5%	13.0%	3.5%

Germans have been in Australia since the commencement of European settlement in 1788. At least seventy-three Germans arrived in Australia as convicts.

=== 19th century ===
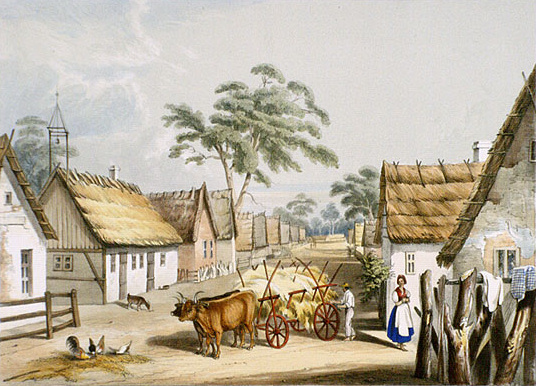
Klemzig, the first German settlement in Australia (now a suburb of Adelaide), painted by George French Angas in 1846

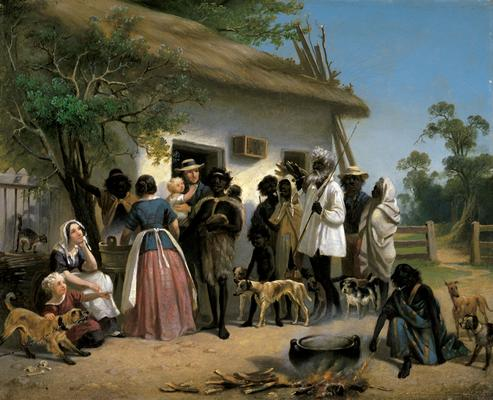
Alexander Schramm's A Scene in South Australia (1850) depicts German settlers with Aboriginal people

Germans formed the largest non-English-speaking group in Australia up to the 20th century.

==== Old Lutherans ====
Old Lutherans emigrated in response to the 1817 Prussian Union, and organized churches both among themselves and with other German speakers, such as the Kavel-Fritzsche Synod. Although a few individuals had arrived earlier, the first large group of Germans to arrive in Australia were Old Lutherans that immigrated to South Australia in 1838, not long after the British colonisation of South Australia.

These Old Lutherans were from the Province of Brandenburg (then a Prussian province), and were trying to preserve their traditional faith. They migrated with the financial assistance of George Fife Angas and the Emigration Fund. Not all subsequent arrivals shared this religious motivation, but the Lutheran Church remained at the centre of the German settlers' lives right into the 20th century.

==== Forty-Eighters ====
Forty-Eighters is a term for those who participated in or supported the European Revolutions of 1848. Many emigrated as a result of those revolutions. In particular, following the ultimate failure of the March Revolution in Germany, a substantial number of Germans immigrated to Australia.

=== 20th century ===
By 1900, Germans were the fourth-largest European ethnic group on the continent, behind the English, Irish and Scots. By 1914, the number of German-Australians (including the descendants of German-born migrants of the second and third generation who had become Australians by birth) was estimated at approximately 100,000.

Throughout both world wars, Australians of German ancestry were considered an 'enemy within' and a number were interned or deported – or both. The persecution of German Australians also included the closure of German schools, the banning of the German language in government schools, and the renaming of many German place names. To avoid persecution and/or to demonstrate that they commit themselves to their new home, many German Australians changed their names into Anglicised or Francophone variants. During World War II, Australia was also place of incarceration of 2,542 enemy aliens deported from Britain, composed of many of the Austrian and German nationals who were expelled in a blanket deportation, and numerous Italian citizens. Notorious for the inhumane treatment present during the voyage, the 2,053 anti-Nazis, 451 prisoners of war, and approximately 55 Nazi sympathisers and others departed from Liverpool via HMT Dunera shortly after the Fall of France in 1940.

After World War II, Australia received a large influx of ethnic German displaced persons, who were a significant proportion of Australia's post war immigrants. A number of German scientists were recruited soon after World War II through the ESTEA scheme, some of them coming by migrant ships such as SS Partizanka. In the 1950s and 1960s, German immigration continued under assisted migration programs promoted by the Australian Government. By July 2000, Germany was the fifth most common birthplace for settler arrivals in Australia after United Kingdom, Ireland, Italy and New Zealand. By 1991, there were 112,000 German-born persons in Australia.

==== World War I ====
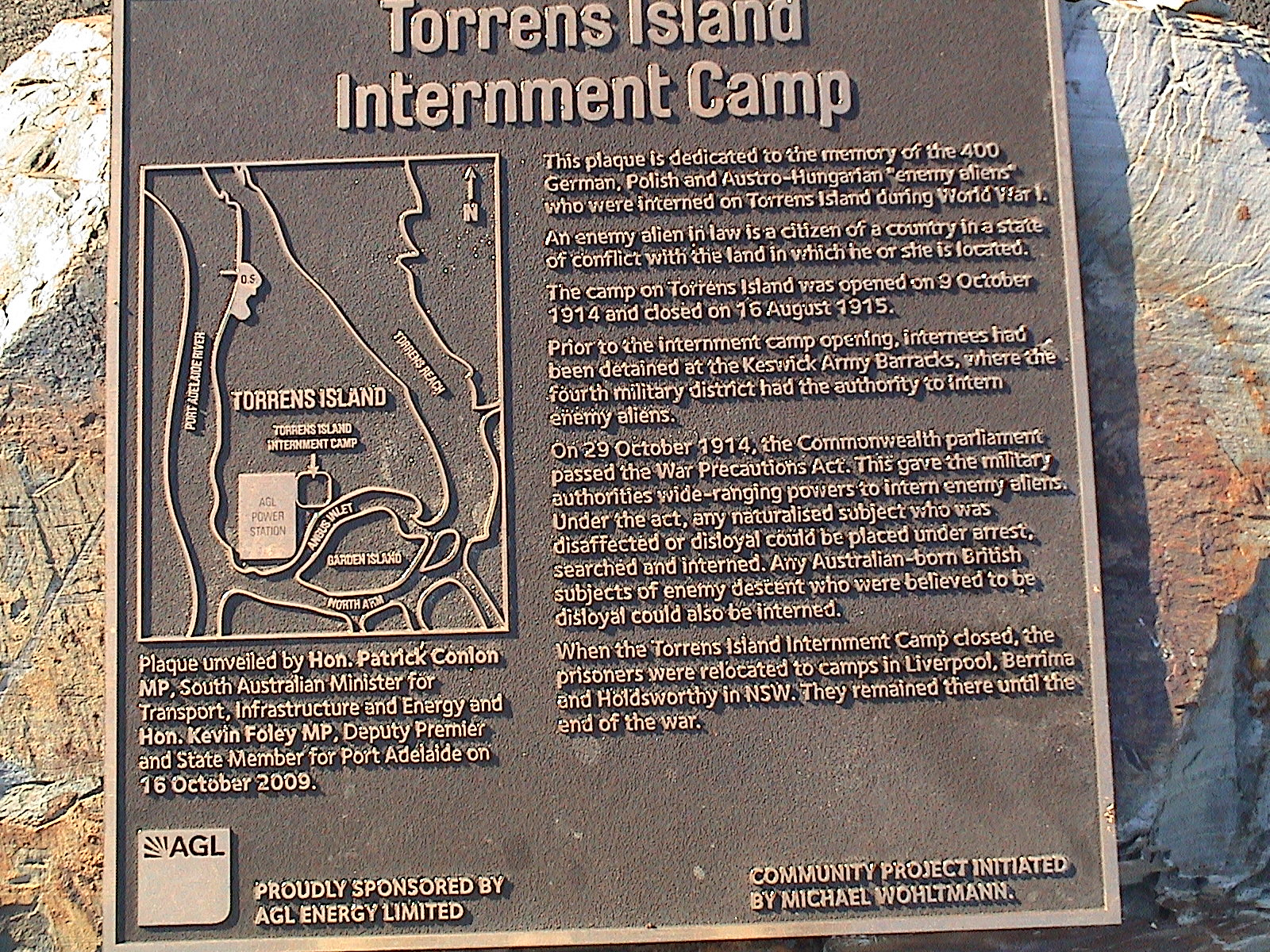
Plaque commemorating the internment camp on Torrens Island

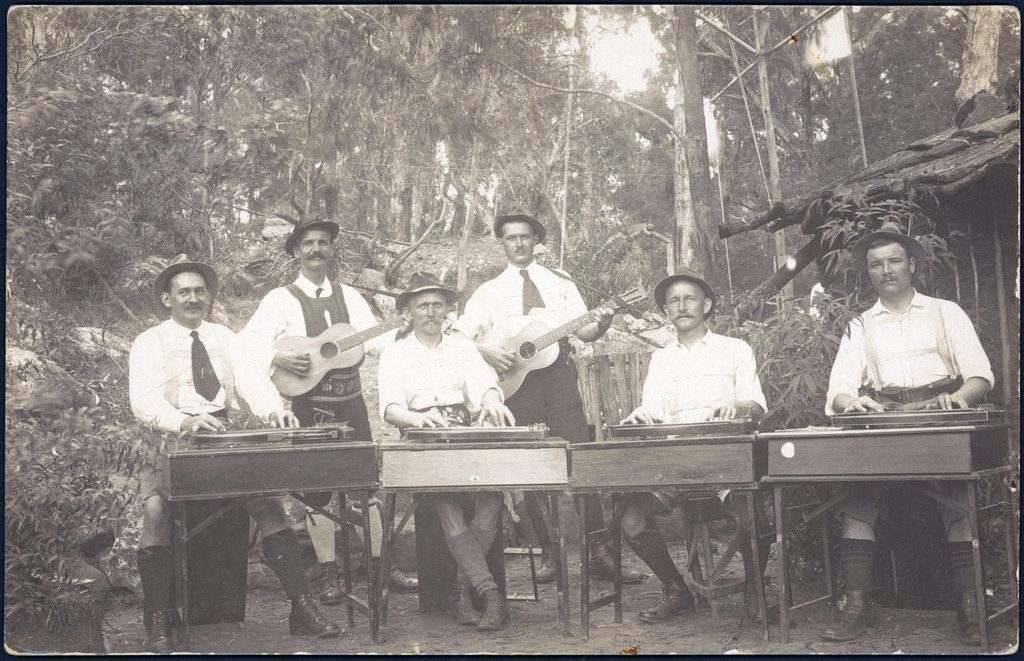
Group of interned Germans playing zithers and guitars in the Berrima camp

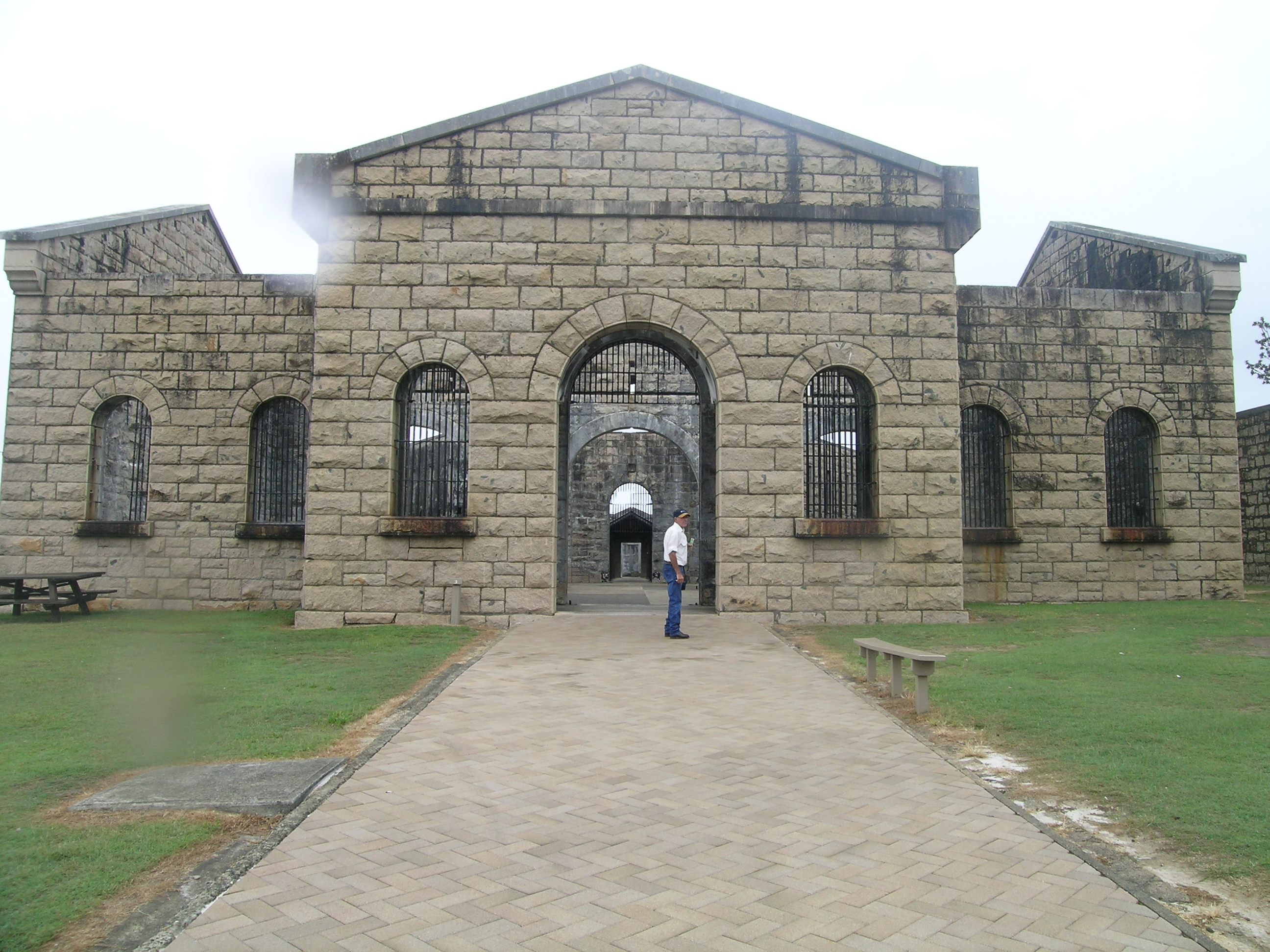
Trial Bay Gaol

The internment camps were maintained by the Australian Army during World War I. At the time, they were also described as concentration camps. Old prison buildings in Berrima and Trial Bay Gaol were initially used as locations for camps in New South Wales.

The largest internment camp in World War I was the Holsworthy Internment Camp, located west of Sydney. There were camps in Berrima; Bourke; Holsworthy and Trial Bay (all New South Wales); Enoggera, Queensland; Langwarrin, Victoria; the Molonglo camp at Fyshwick, Australian Capital Territory; Rottnest Island, Western Australia; and Torrens Island, South Australia. Smaller and temporary internment camps were also established on Bruny Island, Tasmania; Fort Largs, South Australia; and Garden Island, Western Australia. The camp on Rottnest Island, which operated from the end of 1914 until the end of 1915, housed 989 people in September 1915. Among this group were 841 Australian and Austrian internees, as well as 148 prisoners of war. According to a statement by the Australian War Memorial organisation, there were a total of 7,000 people interned over the course of World War I, including roughly 4,500 Germans and British people of German background who had already been living in Australia for a long time. This meant approximately 4.5% of the German-Australian population were held in internment camps.

One of the largest internment camps for imprisoned officers and soldiers of the Imperial German Navy from the warzones in the Pacific, in China and in Southeast Asia, was the Trial Bay Gaol. Among those interned were German and Austrian business people who had been captured on ships, as well as wealthy, high-standing Germans and Austrians living in Australia who were assumed to be sympathising with the enemy. The camp was opened in August 1915 and at its peak contained as many as 580 men. The internees were held in solitary cells within the prison, with the exception of those with a high social or military rank, who were kept in cabins on the bay. The prisoners were free to swim, fish, and sunbathe on the beach or play tennis in the prison yard on a court they had built themselves. In 1916 they held a theatre performance of the comedy Minna von Barnhelm by Gotthold Ephraim Lessing. They had their own orchestra and in 1917 created their own newspaper named Welt am Montag (transl. World on Monday), which was published once a week. In memory of the four Germans who died in the camp, the internees built a monument on the hill at Trial Bay. The internees were transferred in 1918 due to fears that German warships would be able to land in the bay. They were moved to the Holsworthy internment camp near Sydney, now Holsworthy Barracks. After it became known that graves of the Allied forces in Germany had been vandalised, the internees' monument was destroyed. It was once again constructed in 1960 and now leads the way to the memorial site on the hill.

Some Australians believed that the prisoners were being treated too well. However, they were under constant surveillance, their post was censored and contact with the outside world (as well as contact with internees from other camps) was not allowed.

Many internees from Western Australia were transported to camps in New South Wales, including the 193 German marines from the SMS Emden which had been defeated by HMAS Sydney.

After the war ended, the camps were shut down and most of the occupants were deported, but German immigration was only made legal again in 1925. The German population increased slowly as a result and eventually came to a halt in 1933 with Adolf Hitler's rise to power.

==== World War II ====
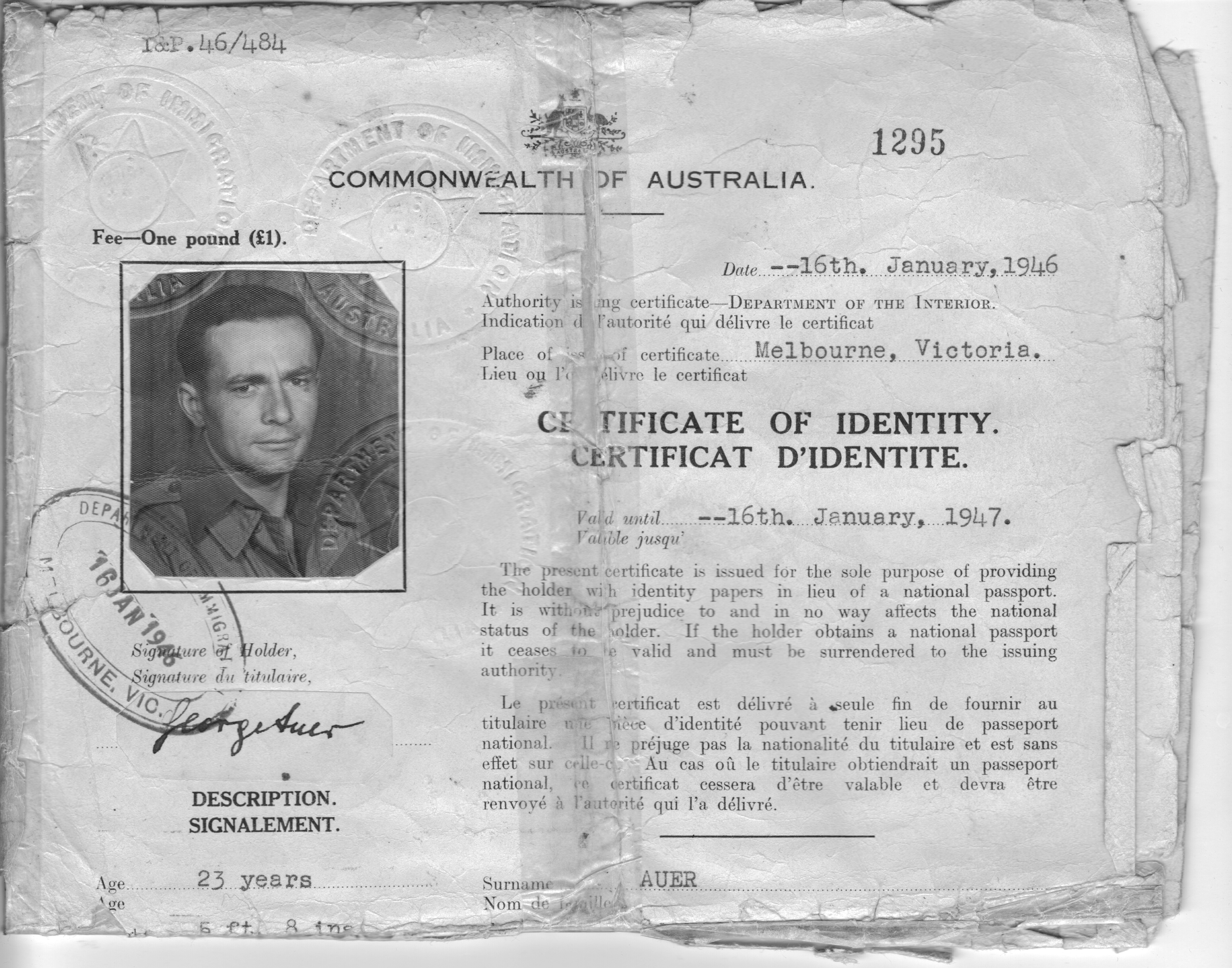
Georg Auer – of Austrian-Jewish origin – who came to Australia on the Dunera. He was interned until 1942 and later joined the Australian Army

In World War I, the majority of internees were of German heritage. However, in World War II, a large number of Italians and Japanese were also imprisoned. The internees, which included women and children, had come from more than 30 different countries, including Finland, Hungary, Portugal and also the Soviet Union. In addition to the Australian residents who were imprisoned, there were also people of German and Japanese descent who were captured overseas and brought to Australia. These people came from England, Palestine, Iran, present-day Singapore, Malaysia, Indonesia, New Zealand and New Caledonia. The first of these groups arrived on the HMT Dunera from England in 1940 (Note: The complete passenger list can be retrieved at National Archives of Australia using the search term "Dunera". It is also possible to search using passenger names.) and their destination was the Hay Internment Camp in New South Wales.

The internment camps in World War II were constructed for three reasons: residents could not be allowed to support Australia's enemies, the public needed to be placated, and those who had been captured overseas and transported to Australia had to be housed somewhere. All Japanese people were immediately imprisoned, but it was only after the war criminals of Nazi Germany and Fascist Italy were discovered that Germans and Italians were sent to the internment camps. This was especially true for those living in northern Australia, because that was where the enemy was expected to invade. More than 20 percent of Italians in Australia were held in internment camps as well as a total of 7,000 people with connections to the enemy, 1,500 of which who were British nationals. 8,000 people from overseas were detained in Australian camps and in 1942, the camps were at their largest, with a total of 12,000 internees in the country. In addition to British people of German origin, Australian fascists could not escape imprisonment: leading members of the Australia First Movement were interned, including Adela Pankhurst and P. R. Stephensen.

== Demographics ==
People with German ancestry as a percentage of the population in Australia divided geographically by statistical local area, as of the 2016 census.

German Australians constitute one of the largest ancestry groups in Australia, and German is the fifth most identified European ancestry in Australia behind English, Irish, Scottish and Italian. German Australians are one of the largest groups within the global German diaspora. At the 2021 census, 1,026,135 respondents stated that they had German ancestry (whether alone or in combination with another ancestry), representing 4% of the total Australian population. At the 2021 census, there were 101,255 Australian residents who were born in Germany.

At the 2021 census, states and territories with the largest numbers of residents nominating German ancestry were Queensland (309,723), New South Wales (242,546), Victoria (212,907), South Australia (135,225) and Western Australia (78,337). German Australians are therefore overrepresented on a per capita basis in Queensland and South Australia.

In December 2001, the Australian Department of Foreign Affairs estimated that there were 15,000 Australian citizens resident in Germany.

According to census data released by the Australian Bureau of Statistics in 2004, German Australians are, by religion, 32.8% Lutheran, 21.7% Catholic, 16.5% Anglican, 24.8% No Religion and 4.2 Other Religions.

In 2001, the German language was spoken at home by 76,400 persons in Australia. German is the eighth most widely spoken language in the country after English, Chinese, Italian, Greek, Arabic, Vietnamese, Spanish, and Tagalog.

== Culture ==
The Australian wine industry was the creation of German settlers in the nineteenth century.

The Goethe-Institut is active in Australia, there are branches in Melbourne and Sydney.

The South Australian German Association has held the annual traditional Adelaide Schützenfest in Brooklyn Park Australia.

=== Education ===
There are the following German international schools in Australia:

- German International School Sydney
- Deutsche Schule Melbourne

=== Media ===
Historically, German newspapers were set up by early settlers, with many being forced to close or merge due to labour shortages caused by the Victorian gold rush of the 1850s–1860s. A number of the earliest South Australian newspapers were printed primarily in German, and these included:

- Die Deutsche Post für die Australischen Colonien (1848–1850) – Adelaide: Australia's first non-English newspaper
- Suedaustralische Zeitung (1850–1851) – Adelaide
- Deutsche Zeitung für Süd-Australien (1851) – Tanunda
- Adelaider Deutsche Zeitung (1851–1862) – Adelaide: this was also the first German language newspaper to publish an entertainment supplement, Blätter für Ernst und Scherz.
- Süd Australische Zeitung (1860–1874) – Tanunda/Adelaide
- Australisches Unterhaltungsblatt (1862–1916) – Tanunda: a supplement to the Süd Australische Zeitung and Australische Zeitung
- Tanunda Deutsche Zeitung (1863–1869) – Tanunda; later renamed Australische Deutsche Zeitung
- Australische Deutsche Zeitung (1870–1874) – Tanunda/Adelaide: a Melbourne edition of the newspaper was also printed 1870–1872.
- Neue Deutsche Zeitung (1875–1876) – Adelaide: opposition newspaper to Australische Zeitung
- Australische Zeitung (1875–1916) – Tanunda/Adelaide: formed by the merger of Süd Australische Zeitung, and Australische Deutsche Zeitung; closed due to World War I
- Australische Zeitung (1927–1929) – Tanunda: attempted revival
- Adelaider Post (1960–1962) – Adelaide: South Australian edition of the Sydney-based Die Woche in Australien.
- Neue Australische Post (1984–1993), Salisbury

The Special Broadcasting Service airs a German-language radio program on SBS Radio 2 every weekday from 7 PM to 8 PM. They also air German broadcaster Deutsche-Welle's Der Tag news program every morning as part of its WorldWatch programming block.

=== Missions founded by Germans ===
- Killalpaninna Mission (1866 – 1915): Founded by Johann Friedrich Gößling and Ernst Homann, and two lay brethren, Hermann Vogelsang and Ernst Jakob; later joined by Strehlow.
- Hermannsburg, Northern Territory (1877 – 1982?): Founded by A. Hermann Kemp (sometimes spelt Kempe) and Wilhelm F. Schwarz of the Hermannsburg Mission in Germany.
- Aurukun Mission (1904 – 1913), originally Archer River Mission Station, Queensland: Founded by Moravians Rev. Arthur Richter and his wife Elisabeth
- Bathurst Island Mission (1911 – 1978), founded by Francis Xavier Gsell
- La Grange Mission at Bidyadanga (1955/6–1985)

== Notable Australians of German ancestry ==
Name	Born	Description	Connection to Australia	Connection to Germany
Eric Abetz	1958	Australian senator	Immigrated to Australia from Germany in 1961	Born in Germany
Hugo Alpen	1842	Australian composer	Arrived 1858	Born in Germany
Eric Bana	1968	Australian actor	Born in Australia	German mother
Gerard Brennan	1928	Judge and retired Chief Justice of Australia (1995–1998)	Born in Australia	German maternal ancestry
Bettina Arndt	1949	Sexologist and critic of feminism	Born in the United Kingdom	German father
Heinz Arndt	1915	Economist	Immigrated to Australia	Born in Germany
Adam Bandt	1972	Politician	Born in Australia	German ancestry
Shaun Berrigan	1978	Rugby League player	Born in Australia	German ancestry
Henry Bolte	1908	Politician (Premier of Victoria)	Born in Australia	German ancestry
Dieter Brummer	1976	Soap opera actor	Born in Australia	German ancestry
Ernest Burgmann	1885	Anglican bishop and social justice activist	Born in Australia	German ancestry
Meredith Burgmann	1947	Politician (Australian Labor Party)	Born in Australia	German ancestry
George Savin De Chanéet	1861	Composer	Arrived 1884	Born in Germany
Carl Ditterich	1945	Australian rules footballer	Born in Australia	German ancestry
Scott Drinkwater	1997	Rugby League player	Born in Australia	German ancestry
Andrew Ettingshausen	1965	Rugby League player	Born in Australia	German ancestry
Tim Fischer	1946	Politician (Deputy Prime Minister of Australia)	Born in Australia	German ancestry
Brad Fittler	1972	Rugby League player	Born in Australia	German ancestry
Harry Frei	1951	Cricketer	Immigrated to Australia	Born in Germany
Johannes Fritzsch	1960	Conductor	Works and lives in Australia	Born in Germany
Gotthard Fritzsche	1797	Lutheran pastor	Immigrated to Australia	Born in Germany
Ken Grenda	1945	Businessman and philanthropist	Born in Australia	German ancestry
Michael Grenda	1964	Olympic cyclist	Born in Australia	German ancestry
Laura Geitz	1987	Netballer	Born in Australia	German ancestry
Andre Haermeyer	1956	Politician (Australian Labor Party)	Immigrated to Australia	Born in Germany
Heinrich Haussler	1984	Cyclist	Born in Australia	German ancestry
George Heinz	1891	Australian rules footballer	Born in Australia	German ancestry
Christian Helleman	1881	composer	Born in Australia	German ancestry
Hans Heysen	1877	Landscape artist	Immigrated to Australia	Born in Germany
Ben Hilfenhaus	1983	Cricketer	Born in Australia	German ancestry
Bert Hinkler	1892	Aviator	Born in Australia	German ancestry
Harold Holt	1908	17th Prime Minister of Australia	Born in Australia	German ancestry
Hermann Homburg	1874	Politician	Born in Australia	German ancestry
Moritz Heuzenroeder	1849	composer	Arrived 1871	Born in Germany
David Janetzki	1978	Politician	Born in Australia	German ancestry
August Kavel	1798	Lutheran pastor	Immigrated to Australia	Born in Germany
Kristina Keneally	1968	Politician (Premier of New South Wales, later a senator)	Immigrated to Australia from the United States	German ancestry
Verdet Kessler	1994	Badminton Player	Born in Australia	German father
David Klemmer	1993	Rugby league player	Born in Australia	German ancestry
David Koch	1956	Television presenter	Born in Australia	German ancestry
Gerard Krefft	1830	Zoologist and palaeontologist	Immigrated to Australia	Born in Germany
Sonia Kruger	1965	Television presenter, media personality and dancer	Born in Australia	German ancestry
Dichen Lachman	1982	Actress and producer	Raised in Adelaide, Australia	Born in Kathmandu, Nepal, to a German-Australian father
Ludwig Leichhardt	1813	Explorer	Immigrated to Australia	Born in Germany
Darren Lehmann	1970	Cricketer	Born in Australia	German ancestry
Carl Linger	1810	Composer	Immigrated to Australia	Born in Germany
Stewart Loewe	1968	Australian rules footballer	Born in Australia	German ancestry
Baz Luhrmann	1962	Film director, screenwriter, producer, and actor	Born in Australia	German ancestry
Bertha McNamara	1853	Socialist and feminist	Immigrated to Australia	Born in Germany
John Monash	1865	Australian General	Born in Australia	German (Jewish) parents
Ferdinand von Mueller	1825	Botanist, geologist and physician	Immigrated to Australia	Born in Germany
David Neitz	1975	Australian rules footballer	Born in Australia	German ancestry
Nadine Neumann	1975	Olympic swimmer	Born in Australia	German ancestry
Olivia Newton-John	1948	Actress, singer, and humanitarian	Immigrated to Australia	German (Jewish) mother (daughter of Max Born)
Hubert Opperman	1904	Cyclist and politician	Born in Australia	German ancestry
Annastacia Palaszczuk	1969	39th Premier of Queensland	Born in Australia	German ancestry
Raimund Pechotsch	died 1941	composer	Arrived 1889	Born in Germany
Arthur Phillip	1738	First Governor of New South Wales	Served in NSW 1788–1792	German father
Ingo Rademacher	1971	Soap opera actor	Immigrated to Australia	Born in Germany
Jack Riewoldt	1988	Australian rules footballer	Born in Australia	German ancestry
Nick Riewoldt	1982	Australian rules footballer	Born in Australia	German ancestry
Margot Robbie	1990	Australian actress and producer	Born in Australia	Mother has German ancestry
Michael Rolfe	1962	Australian rules footballer	Born in Australia	German ancestry
Geoffrey Rush	1951	Actor	Born in Australia	German ancestry
Hermann Sasse	1895	Lutheran theologian	Immigrated to Australia	Born in Germany
John Sattler	1942	Rugby league player	Born in Australia	German ancestry
Kathleen Sauerbier	1903	Modernist artist	Born in Australia	German ancestry
Chris Schacht	1946	Politician (Australian Labor Party) and mining company director	Born in Australia	German ancestry
Manfred Schaefer	1943	Football (soccer) player	Immigrated to Australia	Born in Germany
Jessicah Schipper	1986	Olympic swimmer	Born in Australia	German ancestry
Melanie Schlanger	1986	Olympic swimmer	Born in Australia	German ancestry
Brad Schneider	2001	Rugby league player	Born in Australia	German ancestry
Mark Schwarzer	1972	Football (soccer) player	Born in Australia	German ancestry
Emily Seebohm	1992	Olympic swimmer	Born in Australia	German ancestry
Anthony Seibold	1974	Rugby league coach	Born in Australia	German ancestry
Gert Sellheim	1901	Artist	Immigrated to Australia	Born in Estonia to ethnically-German parents
Wolfgang Sievers	1913	Photographer	Immigrated to Australia	Born in Germany
Christian Sprenger	1985	Olympic swimmer	Born in Australia	German ancestry
Lawrence Springborg	1968	Politician (Liberal National Party)	Born in Australia	German ancestry
Carl Strehlow	1871	Lutheran missionary	Immigrated to Australia	Born in Germany
Ted Strehlow	1908	Anthropologist	Born in Australia	German ancestry
Reginald Swartz	1911	Politician (Australian Liberal Party)	Born in Australia	German ancestry
Matthias Ungemach	1968	Olympic rower	Immigrated to Australia	Born in Germany
Michael Voss	1975	Australian rules footballer	Born in Australia	German ancestry
Shane Warne	1969	Cricketer	Born in Australia	German ancestry
Chris Watson	1867	Prime Minister of Australia	Immigrated to Australia	Born in Chile to ethnically-German father
Shane Webcke	1974	Rugby League player	Born in Australia	German ancestry
Fred Werner	1850	music professor	Arrived 1890	Born in Germany
Judith Zeidler	1968	Olympic rower	Immigrated to Australia	Born in Germany
Markus Zusak	1975	Writer	Born in Australia	German ancestry

=== German missionaries ===
There were many German missionaries who emigrated to Australia, established mission stations and worked with Aboriginal Australians, in some cases helping to preserve their languages and culture.

- 1838: Rev. Clamor Wilhelm Schürmann (1815–1893) and Christian Gottlob Teichelmann (1807–1893) established and ran the Pirltawardli (or Piltawodli) Native Location in Adelaide from 1838 to 1845, learning the local Kaurna language, teaching the Kaurna in their own language and translating texts. Later Samuel Klose joined them. Their work provided the basis for a language revival in the 21st century, after the language was all but extinct.
- 1892: Carl Strehlow was an anthropologist, linguist and genealogist who served on two Lutheran missions, Killalpaninna Mission (also known as Bethesda) in northern South Australia from 1892, and then, from October 1894, Hermannsburg, Northern Territory (also known as Finke River), renowned for its artists, with his wife Frieda Strehlow. They were the parents of noted anthropologist Ted Strehlow.
- 1901: German Pallotine missionaries took over the running of the mission station at Beagle Bay Mission in Western Australia.
- La Grange Mission at Bidyadanga (1955/6–1985), was run by Thomas Bachmair (1872–1918). Considered an "enlightened" mission, there was a strong emphasis on enculturation and respect for traditional customs and obligations.

== See also ==
- Australians in Germany
- Barossa German
- European Australians
- Forty-Eighters
- German New Zealanders
- German settlement in Australia
- Goethe-Institut
- History of the Lutheran Church of Australia
- Immigration to Australia
- List of Australian place names changed from German names
- Lutheran Church of Australia
- Temple Society Australia
- German diaspora
- Australia–Germany relations
