= 2012 Tour Down Under =

2012 UCI World Tour, race 1 of 28

Race details
- Dates: 17–22 January 2012
- Stages: 6
- Distance: 803.3 km (499.1 mi)
- Winning time: 20h 46' 12"

Results
Jersey awarded to the overall winner	Winner	Simon Gerrans (Australia)	(GreenEDGE)
	Second	Alejandro Valverde (Spain)	(Movistar Team)
	Third	Tiago Machado (Portugal)	(RadioShack–Nissan)
Jersey awarded to the mountains classification winner	Mountains	Rohan Dennis (Australia)	(UniSA-Australia)
Jersey awarded to the young rider classification winner	Young rider	Rohan Dennis (Australia)	(UniSA-Australia)
Jersey awarded to the sprints classification winner	Sprints	Edvald Boasson Hagen (Norway)	(Team Sky)
	Team	RadioShack–Nissan	

The 2012 Santos Tour Down Under was the 14th edition of the Tour Down Under stage race. It took place from 17 to 22 January in and around Adelaide, South Australia, and was the first race of the 2012 UCI World Tour.

The race was won by Australian Simon Gerrans of the GreenEDGE team, after taking the lead on the penultimate stage of the race and held the race leader's ochre jersey to the finish, the next day, in Adelaide. Gerrans and runner-up Alejandro Valverde – in his first race since a two-year doping ban expired at the end of 2011 – of the Movistar Team, both finished the race in the same total time, but due to better finishes throughout the week, and despite Valverde winning the race's queen stage at Willunga, Gerrans was awarded overall victory via a tie-break situation. RadioShack–Nissan's Tiago Machado completed the podium, eight seconds down on Gerrans.

In the race's other classifications, Rohan Dennis of the UniSA-Australia team won the black jersey for the highest placed rider under the age of 26, by placing fifth overall in the general classification, and Team Sky rider Edvald Boasson Hagen took home the blue jersey for amassing the highest number of points during stages at intermediate sprints and stage finishes; denying Lotto–Belisol's André Greipel, who won three stages during the week. Dennis also won the King of the Mountains classification, with RadioShack–Nissan finishing at the head of the teams classification.

== Participating teams ==
As the Tour Down Under was a UCI World Tour event, all 18 UCI ProTeams were invited automatically and obligated to send a squad. Together with a selection of Australian riders forming the UniSA-Australia squad, this formed the event's 19-team peloton.

The 19 teams invited to the race were:

- Ag2r–La Mondiale
- Astana
- BMC Racing Team
- Euskaltel–Euskadi
- FDJ–BigMat
- Garmin–Barracuda
- GreenEDGE
- Lampre–ISD
- Liquigas–Cannondale
- Lotto–Belisol
- Movistar Team
- Omega Pharma–Quick-Step
- Rabobank
- RadioShack–Nissan
- Team Katusha
- Team Saxo Bank
- Team Sky
- UniSA-Australia
- Vacansoleil–DCM

== Schedule ==
The route for the race was announced on 13 June 2011.

Stage	Route	Distance	Date	Winner
1	Prospect to Clare	149.3 km (92.8 mi)	Tuesday, 17 January	André Greipel (GER)
2	Lobethal to Stirling	148 km (92.0 mi)	Wednesday, 18 January	Will Clarke (AUS)
3	Unley to Victor Harbor	134.5 km (83.6 mi)	Thursday, 19 January	André Greipel (GER)
4	Norwood to Tanunda	130 km (80.8 mi)	Friday, 20 January	Óscar Freire (ESP)
5	McLaren Vale to Old Willunga Hill	151.5 km (94.1 mi)	Saturday, 21 January	Alejandro Valverde (ESP)
6	Adelaide to Adelaide	90 km (55.9 mi)	Sunday, 22 January	André Greipel (GER)

== Stages ==
=== Stage 1 ===
17 January 2012 — Prospect to Clare, 149.3 km (92.8 mi)

A quartet of riders – UniSA-Australia's Rohan Dennis, Vacansoleil–DCM rider Marcello Pavarin, Martin Kohler of BMC Racing Team and Team Katusha's Eduard Vorganov – made the early breakaway from the field, and managed to extend their advantage over the main field to in excess of eleven minutes at one point during the stage, which was run in conditions of 40 °C (104 °F). As such, the riders between them managed to take all sub-classification points on offer during the stage, at both of the intermediate sprints and the single categorised climb at Taylers Run. Their advantage out front dwindled quickly as the peloton – led by Team Sky, Lotto–Belisol and GreenEDGE – gathered pace, taking three minutes from the quartet over 20 km (12.4 mi), leaving them with just 90 seconds of a lead out front. Lotto–Belisol lost their attacking impetus at that point after Greg Henderson, one of the lead-out men for André Greipel, crashed and could not recover back to the main field.

With the field closing yet further, Dennis made a solo bid for victory from 15 km (9.3 mi) out and was clear by around a minute before eventually being caught several kilometres later, towards the run-in to Clare. After Dennis' team-mate Will Clarke had been closed down after a late counter-attack, the field set up for a bunch sprint into Clare. In the final kilometre, a crash involving numerous riders split the field, with many hitting the ground. Three riders – Lotto–Belisol's Jürgen Roelandts, Ag2r–La Mondiale's Matteo Montaguti and FDJ–BigMat rider Frédéric Guesdon – were taken to hospital, along with a spectator who was hit by a rider during the incident. Greipel was slightly delayed on the run-in but managed to bridge back to the front and managed to out-sprint Alessandro Petacchi (Lampre–ISD) to the line, and achieved his ninth stage win at the Tour to take the race's first ochre jersey. Petacchi finished second, despite being reviewed by race commissaires, after Greipel complained over Petacchi's tactics in the closing stages, with Yauheni Hutarovich picking up the remaining bonus seconds on the line for FDJ–BigMat, finishing third. Greipel was the first leader of the sprints classification, Dennis held the lead of the youth classification, Pavarin held the mountains jersey after leading over the only climb of the day and Vorganov was named most combative rider for the stage.

Stage 1 Result

	Rider	Team	Time
1	André Greipel (GER)	Lotto–Belisol	4h 33' 40"
2	Alessandro Petacchi (ITA)	Lampre–ISD	s.t.
3	Yauheni Hutarovich (BLR)	FDJ–BigMat	s.t.
4	Fabio Sabatini (ITA)	Liquigas–Cannondale	s.t.
5	Daniele Bennati (ITA)	RadioShack–Nissan	s.t.
6	Christopher Sutton (AUS)	Team Sky	s.t.
7	Jonathan Cantwell (AUS)	Team Saxo Bank	s.t.
8	Xavier Florencio (ESP)	Team Katusha	s.t.
9	Mark Renshaw (AUS)	Rabobank	s.t.
10	Manuel Belletti (ITA)	Ag2r–La Mondiale	s.t.

General Classification after Stage 1

	Rider	Team	Time
1	André Greipel (GER)	Lotto–Belisol	4h 33' 30"
2	Alessandro Petacchi (ITA)	Lampre–ISD	+ 4"
3	Martin Kohler (SUI)	BMC Racing Team	+ 4"
4	Yauheni Hutarovich (BLR)	FDJ–BigMat	+ 6"
5	Rohan Dennis (AUS)	UniSA-Australia	+ 7"
6	Eduard Vorganov (RUS)	Team Katusha	+ 8"
7	Marcello Pavarin (ITA)	Vacansoleil–DCM	+ 9"
8	Fabio Sabatini (ITA)	Liquigas–Cannondale	+ 10"
9	Daniele Bennati (ITA)	RadioShack–Nissan	+ 10"
10	Christopher Sutton (AUS)	Team Sky	+ 10"

=== Stage 2 ===
18 January 2012 — Lobethal to Stirling, 148 km (92.0 mi)

Just as he had done the previous day, Martin Kohler of BMC Racing Team made it into the race's primary breakaway of the day, and was joined again by a rider from the UniSA-Australia team, with Will Clarke – fresh from a late-stage attack the previous day – joining Kohler out front. Clarke and Kohler remained together for just over 60 km (37.3 mi), with Clarke taking maximum points in the categorised climb at Lenswood, while Kohler twice bested Clarke at the intermediate sprints during the early running, and with the bonus seconds, it allowed him to move into the virtual lead of the race, as he was only four seconds behind race leader André Greipel (Lotto–Belisol) overnight. The pair extended their advantage over the peloton to eleven minutes, before Kohler sat up and elected to return to the main field.

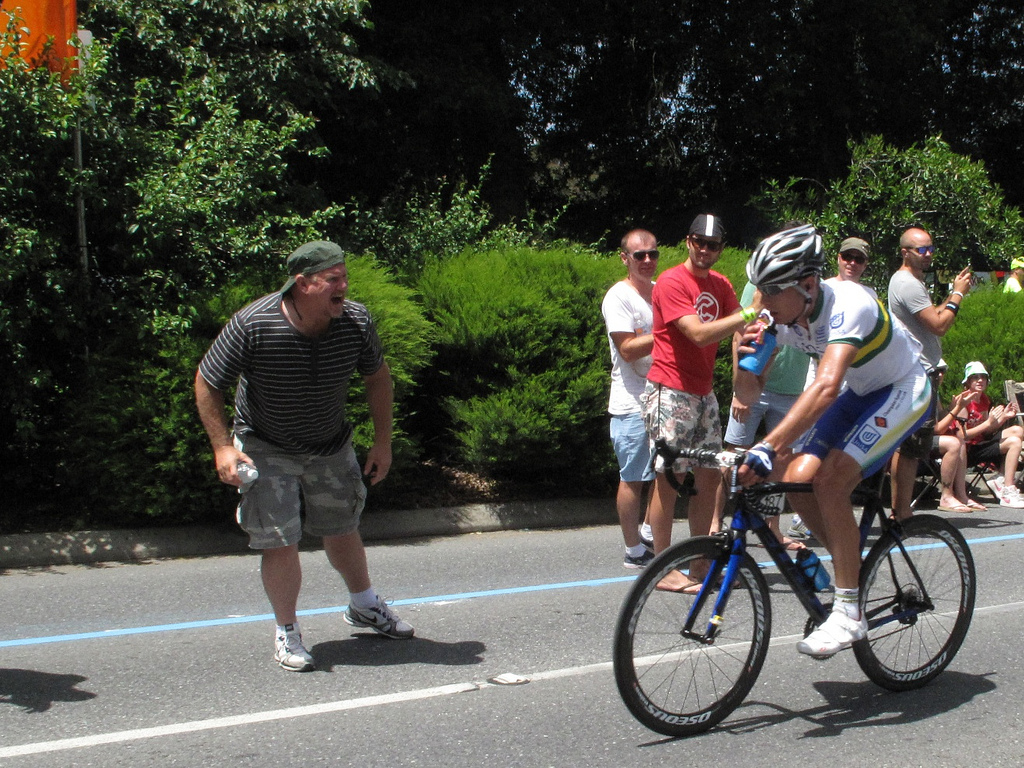
UniSA-Australia rider Will Clarke achieved the first victory of his professional career after being at the head of the race for all bar one of the stage's 148 km (92.0 mi).

After Clarke had been left on his own, the advantage dropped slightly to around eight minutes but after he had steadied himself for a solo escape, the gap to the main field grew once again. The gap was largely held around the ten-minute mark by the peloton, but extended out to over twelve minutes at one point, and by the time Clarke entered the finishing circuit, 21.6 km (13.4 mi) in length, at Stirling for the first of three laps, it was back around ten and a half minutes. Several teams – including Team Sky, Rabobank and GreenEDGE – comprising many of the general classification contenders for the Tour, brought their riders towards the front of the main pack in order to try to get the gap to Clarke down to a sustainable level in order to catch him. Clarke remained ten minutes clear as he entered the second lap of the circuit and despite the panic that had set in to the teams in the peloton, he maintained a sufficient amount of energy to continue holding them off.

He entered the final lap clear by nine minutes, but was tiring dramatically as the fatigue began to set in after his lengthy exploits off the front of the field. He lost almost five minutes in the first half of the final circuit, but Clarke steadied himself and still held a three-minute lead with 5 km (3.1 mi) to go. He held on to the end of the lap and ended up taking the first victory of his professional career, and honours for most combative rider of the day. The main pack was led over the line by Rabobank rider Michael Matthews but 62 seconds in arrears, while GreenEDGE's Simon Gerrans completed a 1–2–3 for Australian riders on the day, just ahead of Alejandro Valverde (Movistar Team). Kohler managed to finish within the pack to take his first race leader's jersey, while Clarke became the leader in the sprints and mountains classifications, and Matthews moved into the black jersey for youth leader in third place overall.

Stage 2 Result

	Rider	Team	Time
1	Will Clarke (AUS)	UniSA-Australia	3h 58' 35"
2	Michael Matthews (AUS)	Rabobank	+ 1' 02"
3	Simon Gerrans (AUS)	GreenEDGE	+ 1' 02"
4	Alejandro Valverde (ESP)	Movistar Team	+ 1' 02"
5	Edvald Boasson Hagen (NOR)	Team Sky	+ 1' 02"
6	Óscar Freire (ESP)	Team Katusha	+ 1' 02"
7	Greg Van Avermaet (BEL)	BMC Racing Team	+ 1' 02"
8	Luke Roberts (AUS)	Team Saxo Bank	+ 1' 02"
9	Gerald Ciolek (GER)	Omega Pharma–Quick-Step	+ 1' 02"
10	Heinrich Haussler (AUS)	Garmin–Barracuda	+ 1' 02"

General Classification after Stage 2

	Rider	Team	Time
1	Martin Kohler (SUI)	BMC Racing Team	8h 33' 05"
2	André Greipel (GER)	Lotto–Belisol	+ 2"
3	Michael Matthews (AUS)	Rabobank	+ 4"
4	Simon Gerrans (AUS)	GreenEDGE	+ 8"
5	Rohan Dennis (AUS)	UniSA-Australia	+ 9"
6	Eduard Vorganov (RUS)	Team Katusha	+ 10"
7	Xavier Florencio (ESP)	Team Katusha	+ 12"
8	Jonathan Cantwell (AUS)	Team Saxo Bank	+ 12"
9	Jan Bakelants (BEL)	RadioShack–Nissan	+ 12"
10	Luke Roberts (AUS)	Team Saxo Bank	+ 12"

=== Stage 3 ===
19 January 2012 — Unley to Victor Harbor, 134.5 km (83.6 mi)

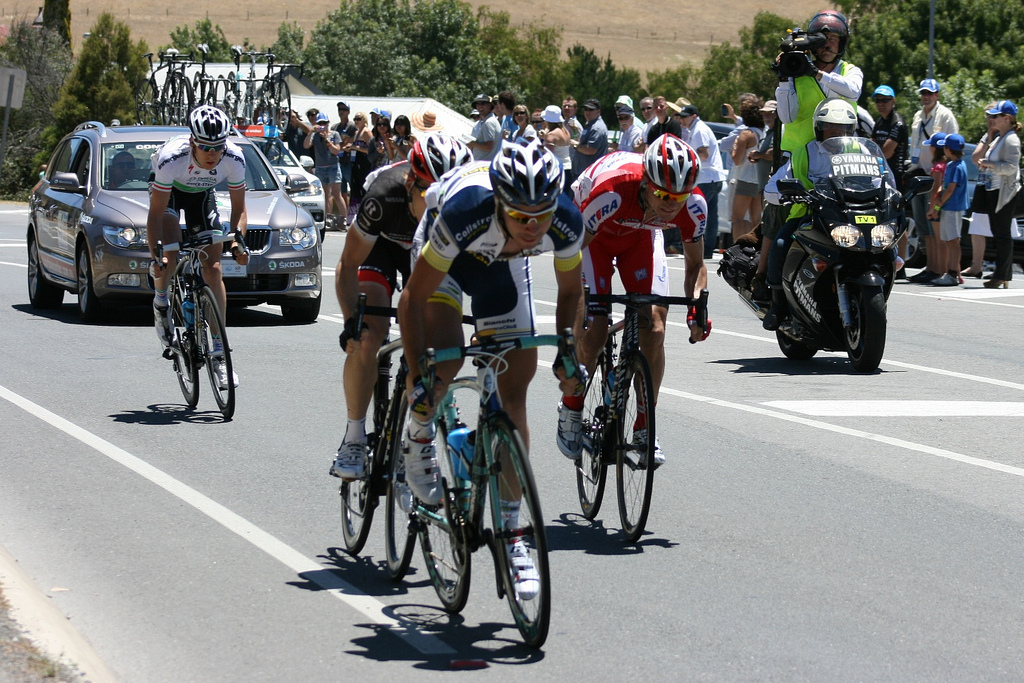
The day's breakaway approaching the first intermediate sprint point of the stage, at Mount Compass. Thomas De Gendt leads Jan Bakelants, Eduard Vorganov and Matt Brammeier.

Just like on stage one, a breakaway quartet – RadioShack–Nissan's Jan Bakelants, Vacansoleil–DCM rider Thomas De Gendt, Matt Brammeier of Omega Pharma–Quick-Step and Team Katusha's Eduard Vorganov – advanced clear of the main field, and managed to extend their advantage to a maximum of around five-and-a-half minutes at one point during the stage, far less than what the pack gave away to Will Clarke the previous day. De Gendt earned maximum points during the stage, as he crossed the single categorised climb at Sellicks Hill ahead of his companions, and also crossed the line first at both of the intermediate sprints, gaining six seconds towards the general classification. Brammeier tried to break clear after their advantage was hurriedly reduced, but the field were back as a whole, with 40 km (24.9 mi) remaining. With the field back together, several teams took turns on the front of the main field in order to try and break riders from the comfort of the peloton.

Rabobank, BMC Racing Team and GreenEDGE did most of the work on the front as they pushed speeds to around 55 km/h (34 mph), prior to the finish in Victor Harbor. With all mini-attacks closed down in the closing stages, it was left to another bunch sprint for the bonus seconds on offer at the line to the top three finishers. Rabobank had looked to set up Michael Matthews for victory and a potential ochre jersey, but could not find clear space to attack, and it was left to Mark Renshaw to lead out the sprint to the line. However, André Greipel (Lotto–Belisol) came around him in the final metres, and thus picked up his second stage win of the week, and his tenth career victory at the Tour Down Under; with the bonus seconds, it allowed him to retake the ochre jersey from Martin Kohler (BMC Racing Team). Yauheni Hutarovich finished second for FDJ–BigMat, while Team Sky rider Edvald Boasson Hagen finished a bike length behind in third place, ahead of Renshaw. Greipel also regained the lead of the sprints classification, Matthews maintained the lead of the youth classification, and De Gendt took both the mountains jersey and the most combative rider honours for the stage.

Stage 3 Result

	Rider	Team	Time
1	André Greipel (GER)	Lotto–Belisol	3h 21' 55"
2	Yauheni Hutarovich (BLR)	FDJ–BigMat	s.t.
3	Edvald Boasson Hagen (NOR)	Team Sky	s.t.
4	Mark Renshaw (AUS)	Rabobank	s.t.
5	Robbie McEwen (AUS)	GreenEDGE	s.t.
6	Jacopo Guarnieri (ITA)	Astana	s.t.
7	Heinrich Haussler (AUS)	Garmin–Barracuda	s.t.
8	Daniele Bennati (ITA)	RadioShack–Nissan	s.t.
9	Manuel Belletti (ITA)	Ag2r–La Mondiale	s.t.
10	Christopher Sutton (AUS)	Team Sky	s.t.

General Classification after Stage 3

	Rider	Team	Time
1	André Greipel (GER)	Lotto–Belisol	11h 54' 52"
2	Martin Kohler (SUI)	BMC Racing Team	+ 8"
3	Michael Matthews (AUS)	Rabobank	+ 12"
4	Thomas De Gendt (BEL)	Vacansoleil–DCM	+ 14"
5	Simon Gerrans (AUS)	GreenEDGE	+ 16"
6	Jan Bakelants (BEL)	RadioShack–Nissan	+ 16"
7	Edvald Boasson Hagen (NOR)	Team Sky	+ 16"
8	Eduard Vorganov (RUS)	Team Katusha	+ 16"
9	Rohan Dennis (AUS)	UniSA-Australia	+ 17"
10	Xavier Florencio (ESP)	Team Katusha	+ 20"

=== Stage 4 ===
20 January 2012 — Norwood to Tanunda, 130 km (80.8 mi)

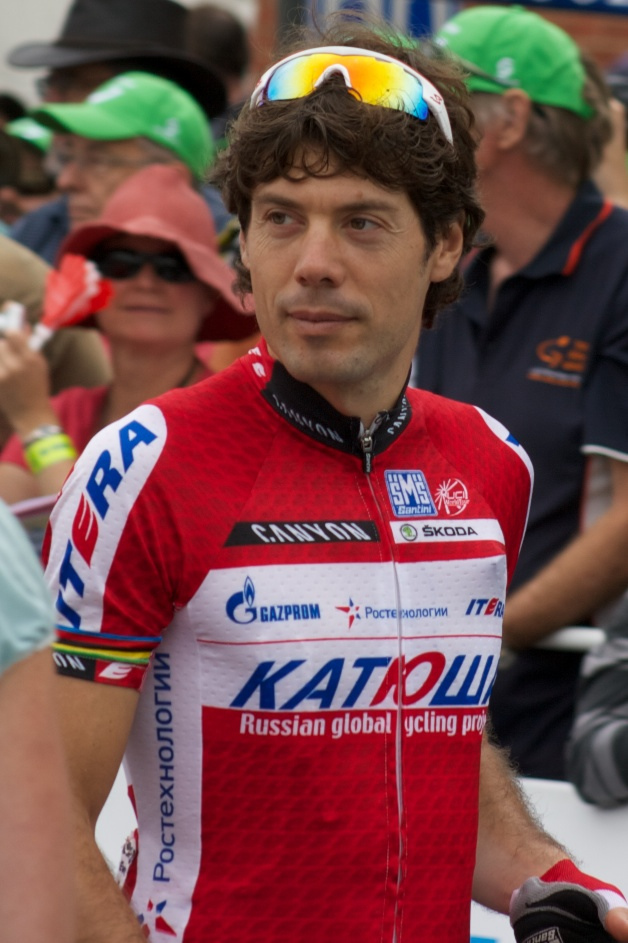
Óscar Freire, pictured before stage 2, achieved his first victory for Team Katusha, after moving from Rabobank over the off-season.

Mini-attacks set the course for the early running of the stage as the field remained as one prior to the first intermediate sprint of the day, coming after 25.3 km (15.7 mi), in the town of Kersbrook. Ochre jersey wearer André Greipel, of Lotto–Belisol, reached the line first, to extend his virtual lead in the general classification to eleven seconds, while Rabobank's Michael Matthews inched closer to second-placed Martin Kohler (BMC Racing Team), by placing second at the sprint. It was not until after the intermediate sprint that the stage's primary breakaway had been formed. Three riders – UniSA-Australia's Jay McCarthy, Rubén Pérez of Euskaltel–Euskadi and Team Katusha's Gatis Smukulis – originally managed to breach the confines of the field, and were later joined by a fourth rider, Ag2r–La Mondiale's Blel Kadri to maintain their bid of extending an advantage over the bunch. Their advantage rarely threatened the main field however, as the peak gap that the four riders out front had, was just over four minutes.

Smukulis quickly dropped back and left his three companions to make the pace out front. GreenEDGE provided the pace in the peloton, and with that speed, it allowed the field to catch the trio out front with around 30 km (18.6 mi) left to run of the parcours, and prior to the final climb of the day at Mengler Hill. With GreenEDGE and Movistar Team still pressurising the field as they were on the climb itself, many riders became dislodged at the back of the peloton due to their nature of the attack. Among those that fell from the comfort zone were race leader Greipel and Vacansoleil–DCM's Thomas De Gendt, who had been in fourth place overall prior to the stage; GreenEDGE sporting director Matt White later stated that their aim for the stage was to remove Greipel from the race equation. UniSA-Australia rider Rohan Dennis led over the hill, to take the 16 points on offer for first place, while Greipel lost more than seven minutes by stage's end.

Just 48 riders of the 131 who started the stage remained as one to contest the finish in Tanunda. At the finish, it was Team Katusha that featured most prominently, and after a four-man leadout, it was Óscar Freire who advanced down the left-hand side of the road in the closing stages, and gained Team Katusha their first win of the season, and his first since the 2011 Ruta del Sol for Rabobank. Gerald Ciolek finished second on the stage for Omega Pharma–Quick-Step, which like Freire, moved him into the top five of the overall classification, which was led once again by Kohler after he was part of the 48 riders that were in contention. Daniele Bennati finished third for RadioShack–Nissan, and the bonus seconds he earned also advanced his position, into sixth overall. After finishing just behind Bennati, Team Sky's Edvald Boasson Hagen replaced Greipel as leader of the sprints classification, Matthews held the lead of the youth classification once again, Dennis earned the mountains jersey after earning maximum points on the final climb and Kadri was named most combative rider for the stage.

Stage 4 Result

	Rider	Team	Time
1	Óscar Freire (ESP)	Team Katusha	3h 08' 34"
2	Gerald Ciolek (GER)	Omega Pharma–Quick-Step	s.t.
3	Daniele Bennati (ITA)	RadioShack–Nissan	s.t.
4	Edvald Boasson Hagen (NOR)	Team Sky	s.t.
5	Michael Matthews (AUS)	Rabobank	s.t.
6	José Joaquín Rojas (ESP)	Movistar Team	s.t.
7	Luke Roberts (AUS)	Team Saxo Bank	s.t.
8	Kristijan Koren (SLO)	Liquigas–Cannondale	s.t.
9	Sergey Lagutin (UZB)	Vacansoleil–DCM	s.t.
10	Heinrich Haussler (AUS)	Garmin–Barracuda	s.t.

General Classification after Stage 4

	Rider	Team	Time
1	Martin Kohler (SUI)	BMC Racing Team	15h 03' 34"
2	Michael Matthews (AUS)	Rabobank	+ 2"
3	Óscar Freire (ESP)	Team Katusha	+ 2"
4	Gerald Ciolek (GER)	Omega Pharma–Quick-Step	+ 6"
5	Simon Gerrans (AUS)	GreenEDGE	+ 8"
6	Daniele Bennati (ITA)	RadioShack–Nissan	+ 8"
7	Edvald Boasson Hagen (NOR)	Team Sky	+ 8"
8	Jan Bakelants (BEL)	RadioShack–Nissan	+ 8"
9	Eduard Vorganov (RUS)	Team Katusha	+ 8"
10	Rohan Dennis (AUS)	UniSA-Australia	+ 9"

=== Stage 5 ===
21 January 2012 — McLaren Vale to Old Willunga Hill, 151.5 km (94.1 mi)

The race's queen stage had an added twist for its 2012 running, with the implementation of Old Willunga Hill – a 3 km (1.9 mi) climb at an average gradient of 7.6% – as a summit finish for the first time. Again like the previous day, much of the early running of the stage was resorted to mini-attacks prior to the formation of the day's breakaway. The stage saw a breakaway of six riders, as they quickly went clear of the main field; home riders Stuart O'Grady (GreenEDGE) and Nathan Haas (Garmin–Barracuda) were joined by Team Saxo Bank's Takashi Miyazawa, Omega Pharma–Quick-Step rider Andrew Fenn, Kristof Goddaert of Ag2r–La Mondiale, and the highest-placed rider of the six, Vacansoleil–DCM's Thomas De Gendt. Their peak advantage of eight minutes over the peloton just about covered themselves in the case that they managed to hold their advantage to the end, as De Gendt trailed Martin Kohler, the race leader for the BMC Racing Team, by 7' 51" overnight.

With strong cross-winds during the stages, several teams – mainly BMC Racing Team, Lotto–Belisol and RadioShack–Nissan – looked to create a split in the field via an echelon, which was ultimately successful as the increased pace managed to shed some thirty riders from the back of the peloton, including Lampre–ISD's Matthew Lloyd for a short period of time; also reduced was the advantage to the sextet out front, cutting their gap from over eight minutes down to the three-minute mark. Goddaert dropped away from the front prior to the first climb of Old Willunga Hill, where Haas attacked and achieved maximum points for the climb; from there, he continued his pace onto the descent. He was chased by De Gendt, whereas O'Grady dropped back in order to help with his team's challenge in the expectation of putting one of their riders into the ochre jersey. Third over the line was Rohan Dennis for UniSA-Australia, to maintain his lead in the mountains classification ahead of De Gendt. Haas was caught prior to the second and final climb of Old Willunga Hill; he was caught with around 10 km (6.2 mi) remaining of the stage by a far reduced lead group.

Movistar Team, Team Sky and RadioShack–Nissan featured prominently in the lead group with several riders from each team looking for a potential stage win and with many riders within a number of seconds of the overall leader, the chance of taking the leader's ochre jersey into the final criterium stage in Adelaide. One rider from each of the prominent teams joined Dennis in a quick break at the foot of the climb, however it was left to Dennis and Tiago Machado (RadioShack–Nissan) to set the pace ahead of the quickly closing peloton. They were caught in the closing stages, which prompted Michael Rogers to launch an attack for Team Sky, but was quickly usurped by Movistar Team's Alejandro Valverde, in his first race back from a doping ban, and the recently crowned national champion of Australia, GreenEDGE's Simon Gerrans. Valverde and Gerrans contested a two-man sprint for the line which Valverde narrowly won, but Gerrans' second-place finish allowed him to take the ochre jersey ahead of Valverde; both riders were on the same time, but due to better cumulative stage finishes, Gerrans took the jersey. Machado finished third ahead of Rogers and Dennis, with the three riders also in that order, taking third, fourth and fifth places in the overall standings and within fifteen seconds of Gerrans' lead. Edvald Boasson Hagen maintained his lead for Team Sky in the sprints classification after finishing sixth on the stage, Dennis added the youth classification lead to his lead of the mountains classification, and O'Grady was named most combative rider of the day.

Stage 5 Result

	Rider	Team	Time
1	Alejandro Valverde (ESP)	Movistar Team	3h 45' 48"
2	Simon Gerrans (AUS)	GreenEDGE	s.t.
3	Tiago Machado (POR)	RadioShack–Nissan	+ 2"
4	Michael Rogers (AUS)	Team Sky	+ 4"
5	Rohan Dennis (AUS)	UniSA-Australia	+ 7"
6	Edvald Boasson Hagen (NOR)	Team Sky	+ 12"
7	Javier Moreno (ESP)	Movistar Team	+ 13"
8	Jan Bakelants (BEL)	RadioShack–Nissan	+ 13"
9	Jack Bauer (NZL)	Garmin–Barracuda	+ 26"
10	Eduard Vorganov (RUS)	Team Katusha	+ 26"

General Classification after Stage 5

	Rider	Team	Time
1	Simon Gerrans (AUS)	GreenEDGE	18h 49' 24"
2	Alejandro Valverde (ESP)	Movistar Team	+ 0"
3	Tiago Machado (POR)	RadioShack–Nissan	+ 8"
4	Michael Rogers (AUS)	Team Sky	+ 14"
5	Rohan Dennis (AUS)	UniSA-Australia	+ 14"
6	Edvald Boasson Hagen (NOR)	Team Sky	+ 18"
7	Jan Bakelants (BEL)	RadioShack–Nissan	+ 19"
8	Javier Moreno (ESP)	Movistar Team	+ 23"
9	Michael Matthews (AUS)	Rabobank	+ 29"
10	Eduard Vorganov (RUS)	Team Katusha	+ 32"

=== Stage 6 ===
22 January 2012 — Adelaide (criterium), 90 km (55.9 mi)

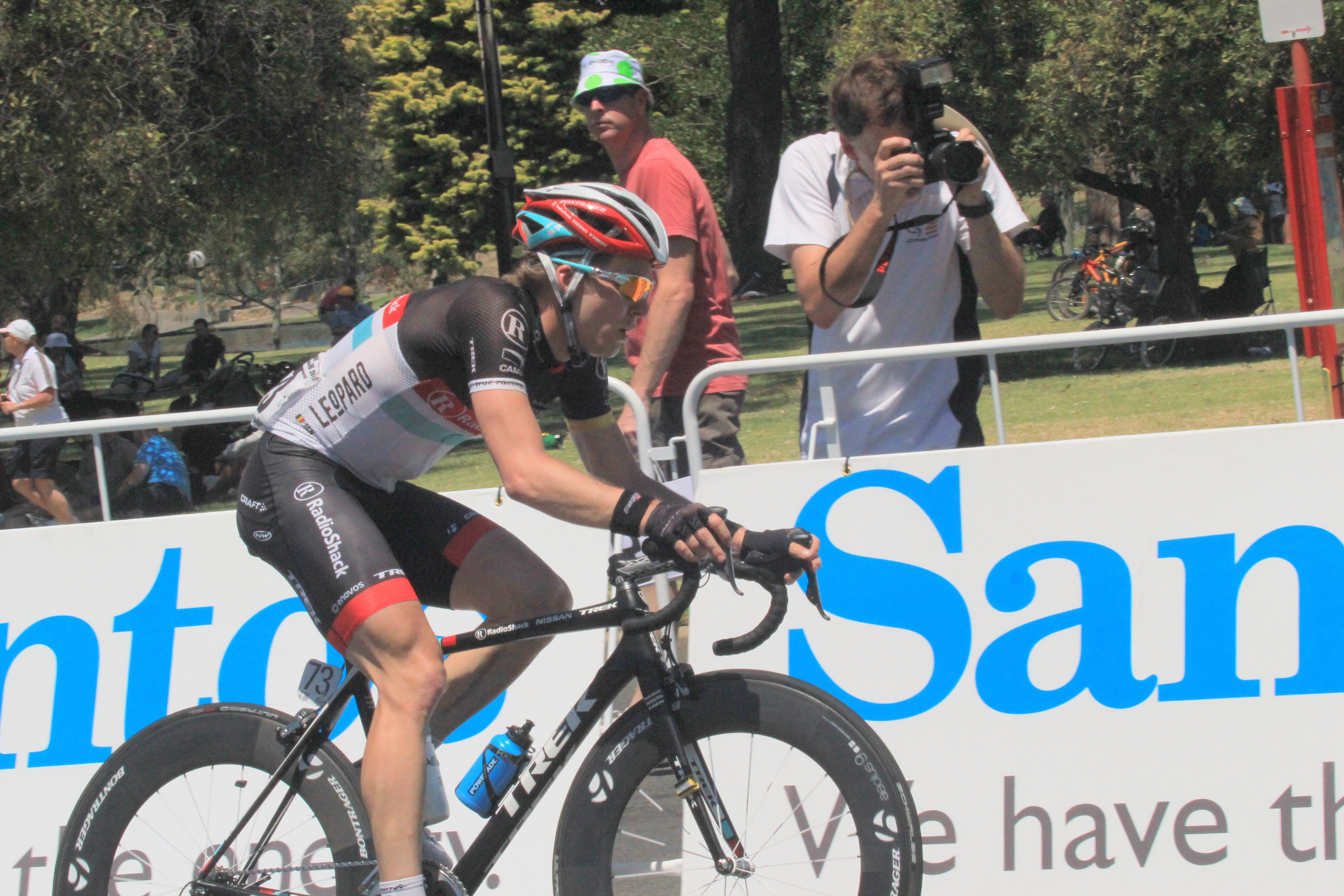
Jan Bakelants was the only rider inside the top ten placings to gain time on the final stage; his bonus seconds earned at the second intermediate sprint allowed him to move up to sixth place overall.

The race finished with its now-customary criterium race around the streets of Adelaide; for the 90 km (55.9 mi) distance, a circuit of 4.5 km (2.8 mi) was completed twenty times with several passages through the finish line counting towards the sub-classifications for sprints and the mountains. Sixteen riders representing thirteen teams managed to get slightly clear of the rest of the field, but their advantage never cleared a minute, and the field was back together just after the first of the intermediate sprints. Prior to the second intermediate sprint, Jan Bakelants of RadioShack–Nissan attacked in the hope of gaining bonus seconds to allow him to move past Team Sky rider Edvald Boasson Hagen for sixth place overall, and went through the sprint first to pick up the three bonus seconds on offer. Bakelants was later joined by defending race winner Cameron Meyer of the GreenEDGE team and Romain Sicard (Euskaltel–Euskadi) to form the second mini-breakaway of the stage.

The trio managed to get clear by a similar distance to what the opening breakaway had achieved – around 40 seconds – and for a time, it allowed Bakelants to be the virtual leader of the race, as he trailed race leader Simon Gerrans – Meyer's team-mate – by just 16 seconds on the road. Ultimately, the sprinters' teams managed to assert themselves on the front of the peloton, with Lampre–ISD, Liquigas–Cannondale and Lotto–Belisol forcing the cause most prominently. Bakelants' bid for victory ended with a lap and a half to go, and was joined by Sicard in that aspect. Meyer tried to go all-out in search of victory, and went into the final lap with an advantage over the closing field. Half a lap later, he was caught and that set up a full-field sprint to close the event. As they had done twice before in the week, it was Lotto–Belisol playing their hand best, as André Greipel was released to a third stage victory and an eleventh career win in the Tour Down Under, putting him one shy of the record held by Robbie McEwen. Second place went to Rabobank's Mark Renshaw, and third to Lampre–ISD rider Alessandro Petacchi.

There was no change in the top five overall, which meant that Gerrans secured the overall title for the second time, after previously winning the race in 2006 for AG2R Prévoyance; it also allowed GreenEDGE to claim victory in its first World Tour event. Sixth place on the final stage was enough for Boasson Hagen to claim the sprints classification; despite not winning any stages, Boasson Hagen's consistent finishing across the entire week allowed him to accumulate points from all positions, whereas Greipel's three stage wins were rarely backed up by other high finishes. Dennis held the lead of the youth classification, and also kept a hold of the mountains classification lead as Thomas De Gendt (Vacansoleil–DCM) and Gerrans failed to take any points on offer for the stage, and both fell five points shy of Dennis' total. Bakelants claimed the final most combative rider of the stage award, as he managed to move into sixth place overall thanks to bonus time won on the stage.

Stage 6 Result

	Rider	Team	Time
1	André Greipel (GER)	Lotto–Belisol	1h 56' 48"
2	Mark Renshaw (AUS)	Rabobank	s.t.
3	Alessandro Petacchi (ITA)	Lampre–ISD	s.t.
4	Yauheni Hutarovich (BLR)	FDJ–BigMat	s.t.
5	José Joaquín Rojas (ESP)	Movistar Team	s.t.
6	Edvald Boasson Hagen (NOR)	Team Sky	s.t.
7	Romain Feillu (FRA)	Vacansoleil–DCM	s.t.
8	Jonathan Cantwell (AUS)	Team Saxo Bank	s.t.
9	Fabio Sabatini (ITA)	Liquigas–Cannondale	s.t.
10	Manuel Belletti (ITA)	Ag2r–La Mondiale	s.t.

Final General Classification

	Rider	Team	Time
1	Simon Gerrans (AUS)	GreenEDGE	20h 46' 12"
2	Alejandro Valverde (ESP)	Movistar Team	+ 0"
3	Tiago Machado (POR)	RadioShack–Nissan	+ 8"
4	Michael Rogers (AUS)	Team Sky	+ 14"
5	Rohan Dennis (AUS)	UniSA-Australia	+ 14"
6	Jan Bakelants (BEL)	RadioShack–Nissan	+ 16"
7	Edvald Boasson Hagen (NOR)	Team Sky	+ 18"
8	Javier Moreno (ESP)	Movistar Team	+ 23"
9	Michael Matthews (AUS)	Rabobank	+ 29"
10	Eduard Vorganov (RUS)	Team Katusha	+ 32"

== Classification leadership table ==
In the 2012 Tour Down Under, four different jerseys were awarded. For the general classification, calculated by adding each cyclist's finishing times on each stage, the leader received an ochre jersey. This classification was considered the most important of the 2012 Tour Down Under, and the winner of the classification was considered the winner of the race.

Additionally, there was a sprints classification, which awarded a blue jersey. In the sprints classification, cyclists received points for finishing in the top 15 in a stage. For winning a stage, a rider earned 15 points, with one point fewer per place down to a single point for 15th place. Points towards the classification could also be accrued at intermediate sprint points during each stage; these intermediate sprints also offered bonus seconds towards the general classification. There was also a mountains classification, the leadership of which was marked by a white jersey. In the mountains classification, points were won by reaching the top of a climb before other cyclists, with more points available for the higher-categorised climbs.

The fourth jersey represented the young rider classification, marked by a black jersey. This was decided in the same way as the general classification, but only riders born after 1 January 1986 were eligible to be ranked in the classification. There was also a classification for teams, in which the times of the best three cyclists per team on each stage were added together; the leading team at the end of the race was the team with the lowest total time, and each member of the winning team received a light blue jersey on the final podium. Additionally, a red jersey was awarded on the podium each day, for the most aggressive rider, or riders, of that day's stage.

Stage	Winner	General Classification	Mountains Classification	Sprint Classification	Young Rider Classification	Team Classification	Aggressive Rider
1	André Greipel	André Greipel	Marcello Pavarin	André Greipel	Rohan Dennis	Team Sky	Eduard Vorganov
2	Will Clarke	Martin Kohler	Will Clarke	Will Clarke	Michael Matthews	UniSA-Australia	Will Clarke
3	André Greipel	André Greipel	Thomas De Gendt	André Greipel	Michael Matthews	UniSA-Australia	Thomas De Gendt
4	Óscar Freire	Martin Kohler	Rohan Dennis	Edvald Boasson Hagen	Michael Matthews	Team Sky	Blel Kadri
5	Alejandro Valverde	Simon Gerrans	Rohan Dennis	Edvald Boasson Hagen	Rohan Dennis	RadioShack–Nissan	Stuart O'Grady
6	André Greipel	Simon Gerrans	Rohan Dennis	Edvald Boasson Hagen	Rohan Dennis	RadioShack–Nissan	Simon Gerrans
Final		Simon Gerrans	Rohan Dennis	Edvald Boasson Hagen	Rohan Dennis	RadioShack–Nissan	not awarded
