= Bethany, South Australia =

Bethany Bethanien (Barossa German)
- Town
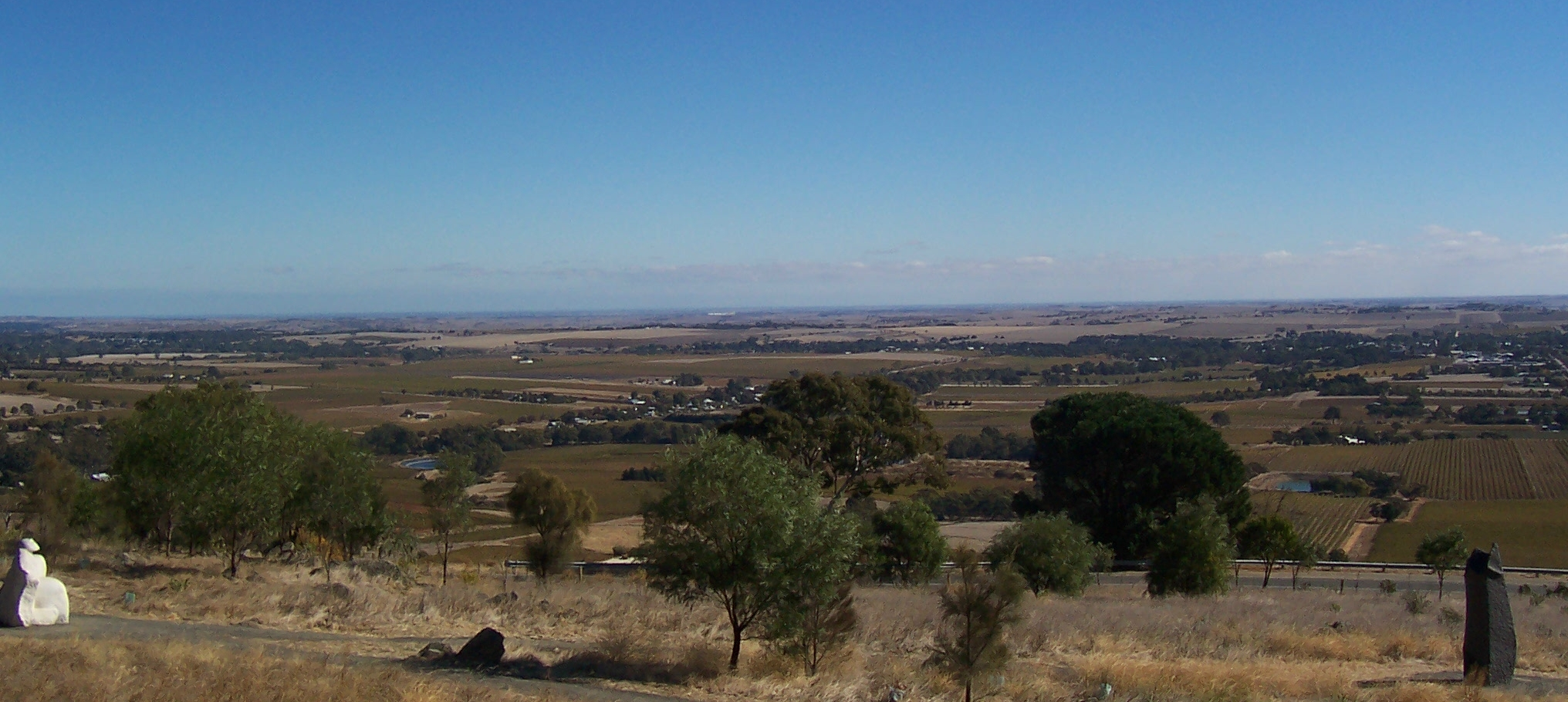
- Bethany as viewed from Mengler Hill

- Coordinates: 34°32′S 138°58′E
- Country: Australia
- State: South Australia
- Region: Barossa, Light and Lower North
- LGA: Barossa Council
- Location: 2 km (1.2 mi) from Tanunda
- Established: 1842

Government
  - State electorate: Schubert
  - Federal division: Barker
- Elevation: 283 m (928 ft)

Population
  - Total: 146 (SAL 2021)
- Postcode: 5352
Localities around Bethany
Tanunda	Vine Vale	Angaston
Tanunda	Bethany
Rowland Flat	Krondorf	Flaxman Valley

Bethany is a small village in South Australia about 2 km south-east of Tanunda in the Barossa Valley. It was originally named Bethanien (German: [beːˈtaːni̯ən] beh-ta-NEE-en) or sometimes New Silesia (German: Neu Schlesien, pronounced [nɔɪ̯ ˈʃleːzi̯ən]), but was changed during the First World War in an attempt to remove all German place names from Australia. Similarly, the German-language school was forced to close by the state government in 1917, with 60 students at the time.

Bethany was the first German settlement in the Barossa Valley area. It was settled in 1842, by Prussian immigrants who had leased land from George Fife Angas. The large portion of these initial settlers arrived in 1841, with Pastor Gotthard Fritzsche on the Skjold.
