= Modistach =

Australian automobile from 1901

The Modistach "Quad" was an automobile built in Tanunda, South Australia by local blacksmith Frederick H. Modistach (1882–1963) in 1901. The car was a front engined, belt driven four-wheeler. The front wheels were supported by bicycle forks. Power came from a single cylinder 4.5 hp Automotor engine. The motor was originally air cooled with a basic form of water cooling being installed later in its development.
