= Theodor Scherk =

Australian politician (1836–1923)

Theodor Johannes Scherk
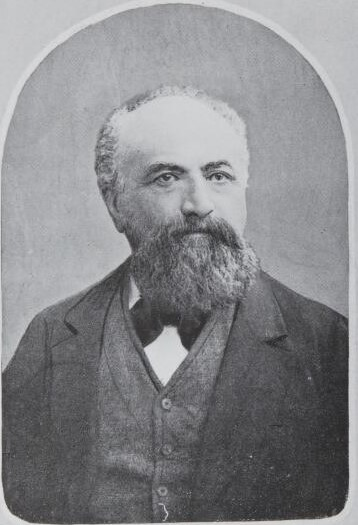

Member for East Adelaide
- In office 1886–1902

Member for Adelaide
- In office 1902–1905

Personal details
- Born: 8 July 1836 Kiel, Holstein, Denmark
- Died: 10 August 1923 (aged 87) Adelaide
- Resting place: West Terrace Cemetery
- Spouse: Agnes Wilhelmine Wilke (m. 1862)

Johann Theodor Scherk (8 July 1836 – 10 August 1923), generally referred to as J. T. Scherk or Theodor Scherk, was an Australian politician who represented the South Australian House of Assembly multi-member seats of East Adelaide from 1886 to 1902 and Adelaide from 1902 to 1905. He was born in Kiel, Holstein, Denmark on 8 July 1836 and migrated to South Australia in 1861.

He served for a time as president of the Adelaide German Club.
