= Tanunda Liedertafel =

The Tanunda Liedertafel is a 45-member male choir in Tanunda, South Australia. Drawing its four-part (TTBB) singing material from traditional popular German culture. The group's origins date back to 1850, based on an entry in The South Australian (10 January 1851). Previously, the choir researchers had only been able to confirm back to 1861 based on a surviving music book case with the words Tanunda Liedertafel 1861 painted on its metal lid, and a report in the South Australian Register of a concert in Tanunda dated 22 October 1861 .

The members were also instrumental in the formation of a "German Club" in Tanunda in 1855, proving the continuous nature of the choir from 1850 to World War 1.

The choir was re-organized in 1920 and, aside from an interruption caused by World War II has been active ever since, primarily in Tanunda and Adelaide. Along with third- and fourth-generation German-Australians, the group includes singers with Dutch, British, Polish and Irish backgrounds. Given the nationalities of the members, nearly 50 percent of the material sung is in English or Latin (where tradition dictates).

Many of their performances are for charity. An annual event is the Kaffee Abend in mid-November (October 2013 being the only known exception). Over the years, fundraising concerts have raised finances for the (now) Tanunda Hospital, and very substantial funds for the original construction and later extensions for the (now) Tanunda Soldier's Memorial Hall. Another worthy recipient was the United Nations Appeal for Children (U.N.A.C.).

The Australian Broadcasting Corporation has recorded the Liedertafel several times since 1932. The choir first performed on television in 1961 for its centenary. It has also appeared on programs broadcast in Germany.

In 1963, Tanunda Liedertafel performed for Queen Elizabeth II in Elder Park, Adelaide. In 2001, it performed in Adelaide for US President Bill Clinton.

Awards have included the Zelter Plaque (1980).

The choir also attends Saengerfest(s), this is where groups of choirs (similar to the Tanunda Liedertafel) come together for a weekend of traditional German and Austrian song. The first of these was held in Tanunda in 1874, then again in 1991 and again in 2011. A more recent Saengerfest was held in Canberra, Australia in October 2014.

Practices are held for two hours each Tuesday night, at The Tanunda Soldier's Memorial Hall (Barossa Gallery) eleven months out of the year (although members are no longer fined three pence for tardiness, or six pence for non-attendance).
