= Heribert Calleen =

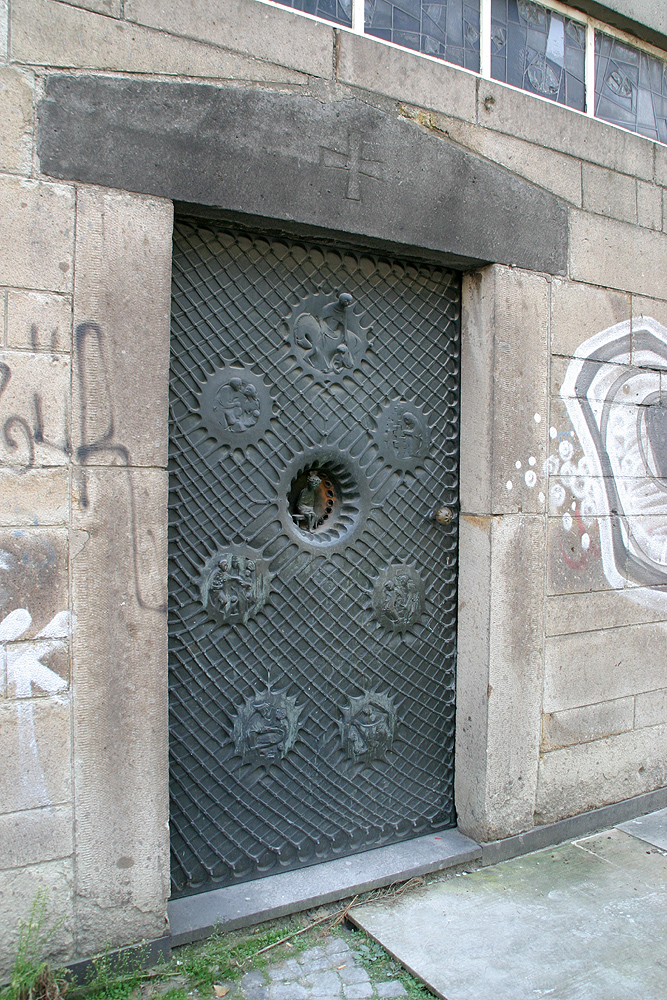
Portal of Klein St. Martin, Cologne

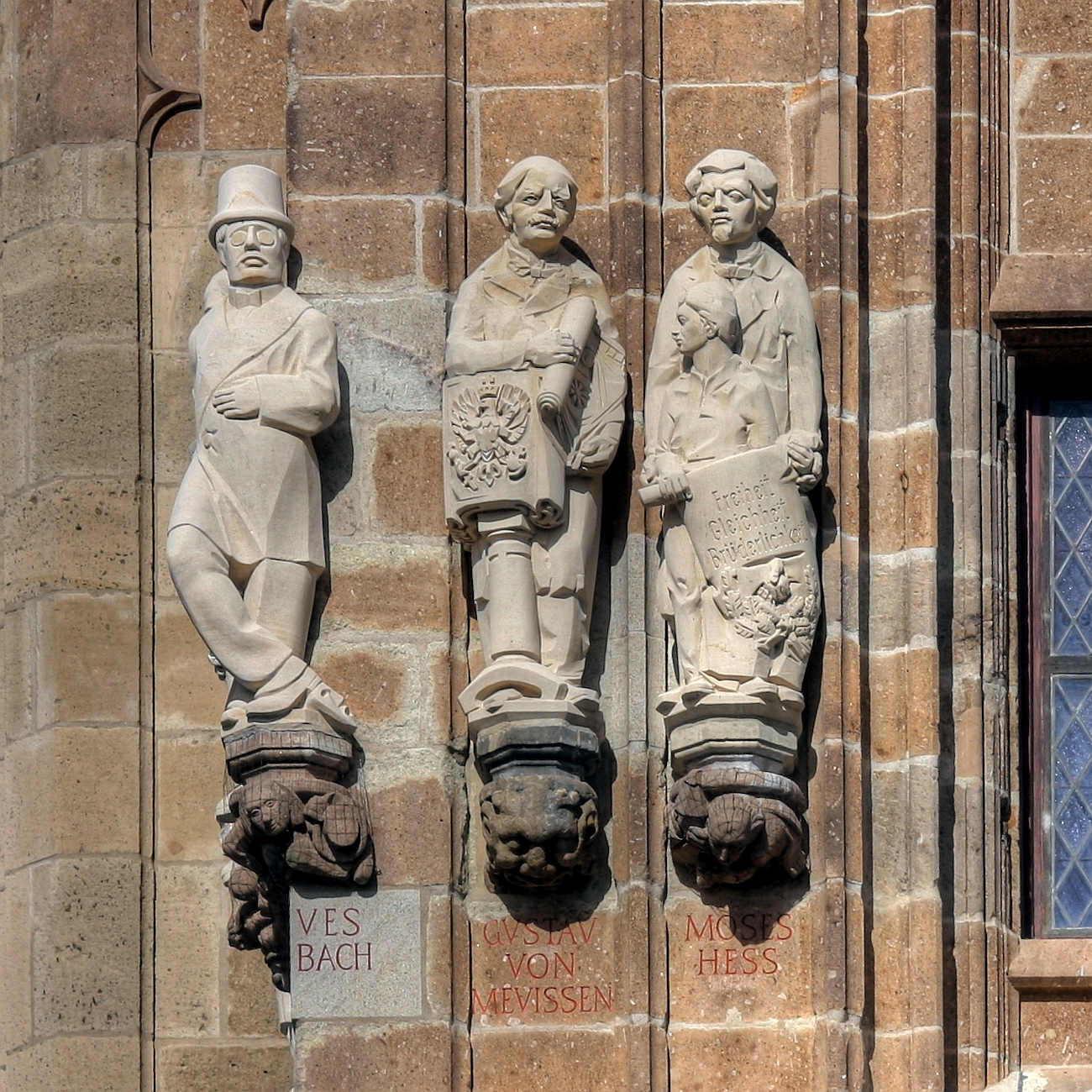
Figure of Gustav von Mevissen (Mitte), Town Hall, Cologne

Heribert Calleen (born Herbert Calleen, 6 March 1924 - 24 November 2017) was a German sculptor and medalist. His oeuvre includes medals and plaques, statues and sculptures, fountains, monuments, memorials, monuments and works of art for the sacred space. A master student of Ludwig Gies, he was from 1954 to 1987 the tomb adviser (Grabmalberater) of Cologne.

== Life and work ==
Born in Cologne, he was guided by Toni Stockheim a sculpture in 1946. From 1947, he learned stonemasonry in the Cologne cathedral workshop. At the same time he studied sculpture at the Kölner Werkschulen with Wolfgang Wallner and Ludwig Gies. In 1952, he was a master student of Gies, famous for the art of coin cutting. In 1954, he opened his own studio in Cologne and at the same time took over the office of a tomb adviser at the Cologne cemetery administration, which he held until 1987. He designed the Zelter-Plakette in 1956, among others.

Heribert Calleen has two children, publicist and editor Florine Calleen and art historian Justinus Maria Calleen.

=== Selected works ===
- 1955 Cologne: St. Maria im Kapitol, Hermann-Josef-Reliquiar
- 1956 Cologne: Melaten Cemetery, memonument for Annmarie Kluxen-Pohlmeier
- 1957 Cologne-Deutz: Rheinpark, fountains, colour scheme
- 1968 Cologne: Rudolfplatz, Würfelbrunnen, Belgischer Granit
- 2009 Cologne Cathedral, Gedenktafel (Plaque) "Weltjugendtag" 2009
