= Zelter-Plakette =

German national award for choirs

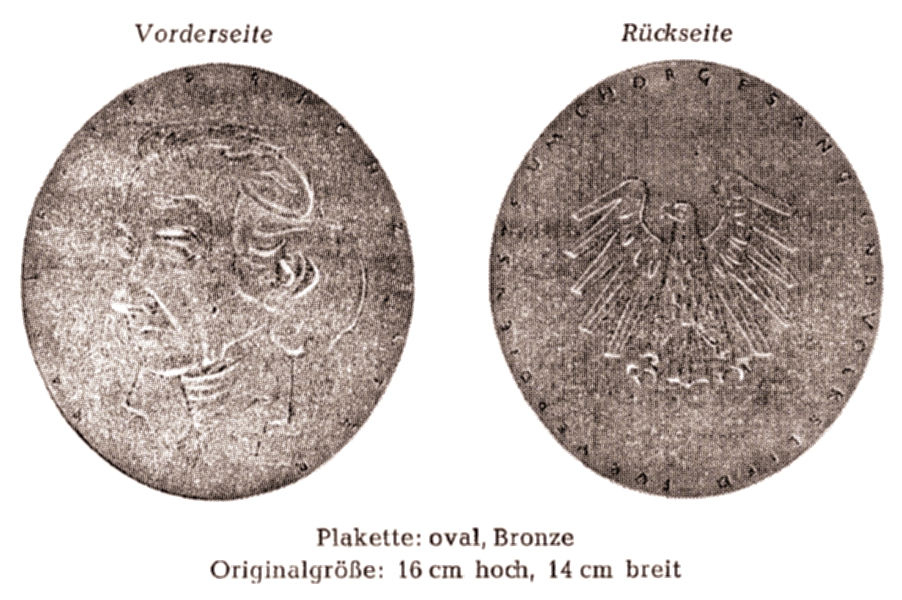
Zelter-Plakette, the front showing Zelter

The Zelter-Plakette (Zelter Plaque) is a German national award for choirs, founded in 1956 by President Theodor Heuss.

== History ==
The plaque was designed by the Cologne sculptor Heribert Calleen. The opening words of the decree of 7 August 1956 translate to:

"In recognition of choral societies that have acquired many years of work in special services to the care of choral music and German folk song and therefore the promotion of cultural life, I found the Zelter-Plakette." The bronze plaque is oval, 16 cm high and 14 cm wide. It shows on its face a portrait of Carl Friedrich Zelter, the director of the first choral society Sing-Akademie zu Berlin, and on the back has a German eagle with the inscription "Für Verdienste um Chorgesang und Volkslied" (For merits in choral singing and folk song).

The Zelter-Plakette is awarded by the president on the occasion of a choir's 100th anniversary, but only on request. Conditions for the award is care of choral singing in serious and successful musical work and artistic and educational achievements within the local conditions. In particular, a choir's activities during the last five years will be acknowledged. The plaque is traditionally awarded on Laetare Sunday, three weeks before Easter in a national ceremony. The president or his representative (State Minister of Culture) awards the medal together with a certificate to one choir, representative of all choirs of that year. Ceremonies in the German states follow.

According to the Arbeitsgemeinschaft Deutscher Chorverbände, 9.755 plaques were awarded from 1957 to 2002, 60 of them to foreign choirs. In 2009, the plaque was awarded to 133 choirs. The office of the president counts 10,955 choirs awarded until 2010, and 114 additional ones in 2011.

A similar award for instrumental groups is the Pro-Musica-Plakette, founded in 1968.

== Selected recipients ==
- Chor von St. Bonifatius (1972)
- Sing-Akademie zu Berlin (1970)
- Tanunda Liedertafel (1980)
- Madison Männerchor – Madison, WI USA (1969)
- Fort Wayne Maennerchor – Fort Wayne, IN USA (1969)
