= Schützenfest (Adelaide) =

German cultural festival in Adelaide, South Australia

The Schützenfest (German: [ˈʃʏtsn̩ˌfɛst], marksmen's festival) held annually in Adelaide, the capital of South Australia, is a German cultural festival. Schützenfests are held in Germany and also around the world. The Adelaide festival has been reputed to be the second largest Schützenfest in the world.

Soon after the British colonisation of South Australia, with settlers arriving from 1836, a large migration of Germans occurred, especially after 1838. The Adelaide German Club was founded on 15 July 1854, and in the same year, the first Schützenfest was held. The German Shooting Society founded in Adelaide in January 1861 was the first recorded in the colony.

The festivals continued to be held in country towns, notably Hahndorf, Lobethal and the Barossa Valley. The first public Schützenfest held in Adelaide was organised by the Adelaide German Club in 1865 in the suburb of St Peters, which drew a crowd of more than 5,000 people (when the total city population was only 27,000). The first event run by the South Australian German Association (founded 1886) was held in the suburb of Walkerville on 30 December 1889.

It was not held again until 1964, when it started being held annually at Hahndorf, and in 1994 the event was moved to Adelaide, where it was held in Bonython Park in the western parklands over a weekend. The event included activities for children (such as Humphrey B. Bear and singer Peter Combe), music, dancing, food and drink. For some years the event took place in the height of summer, sometimes resulting in people suffering heatstroke, such as in the middle of a heatwave in January 2001. In 2010 the festival took place at Ellis Park/ Tampawardli, after being moved by Adelaide City Council from Bonython Park owing to roadworks. By 2015 it was back in Bonython Park.

In April 2021 the first Schützenfest was held over two days at the German Club's new home in the western suburb of Brooklyn Park.

== See also ==
- German Australian
- German settlement in Australia
