= Andrew Murray (journalist) =

Australian journalist

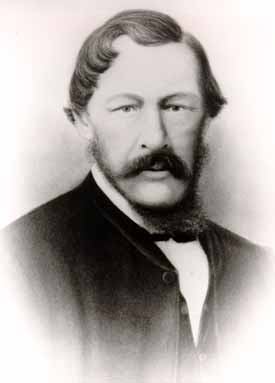
- Born: 16 May 1813; Kirkbean, Kirkcudbrightshire, Scotland
- Died: 8 October 1880 (aged 67); Yarragon, Victoria, Australia
- Occupations: Draper; Government printer Journalist; Landowner; Newspaper editor Newspaper owner Political writer Winemaker
- Spouse: Jessie Spence (married 1841-1880)

Andrew Murray (1813–1880) was an Australian journalist.

Andrew Murray was born in Scotland, and educated at the Andersonian University in Glasgow, winning prizes (including a gold medal and a Glasgow Peel Club prize of 15 guineas) as an essayist.

He emigrated to Adelaide in 1839, and founded a drapery business in Hindley Street (at that time Adelaide's foremost shopping precinct) with George Greig as Murray, Greig, & Co. Murray married Jessie Spence, sister of Catherine Helen Spence, in 1841.

In 1841, the business failed, and Murray was able to find employment as a journalist with the Southern Australian, the second newspaper to be established in South Australia. In 1844, he purchased the Southern Australian from the proprietor, Richard Blackham, and was its editor and proprietor till the exodus of workers to the gold-fields of Victoria severely strained South Australia's economy, and the South Australian, as Murray had renamed it, reverted from bi-weekly to weekly, then in July 1851 was forced to fold. He was responsible for printing at least one other newspaper, the German-language Suedaustralische Zeitung and its successor Adelaider Deutsche Zeitung.

Murray then migrated to Victoria, and worked as commercial editor with The Argus, and acted as editor in 1855 and 1856. He was subsequently the editor and proprietor of the (Melbourne) Economist. He published Murray's Prices Current and an almanac book, and also traded in wines, but was forced to declare insolvency in 1874.

In the late 1850s, Murray bought land in Boroondara, 10 km East of Melbourne. He named his house 'Balwyn' from the Gaelic bal and the Saxon wyn, meaning 'the home of the vine'. Balwyn Road and the suburb of Balwyn were named after it. The house was located on the site now occupied by Fintona Girls' School.

He died at Waterloo (now Yarragon), Gippsland and is buried in Boroondara General Cemetery.
