= Skyshow =

Annual fireworks event held in Adelaide, South Australia, from 1985 to 2006

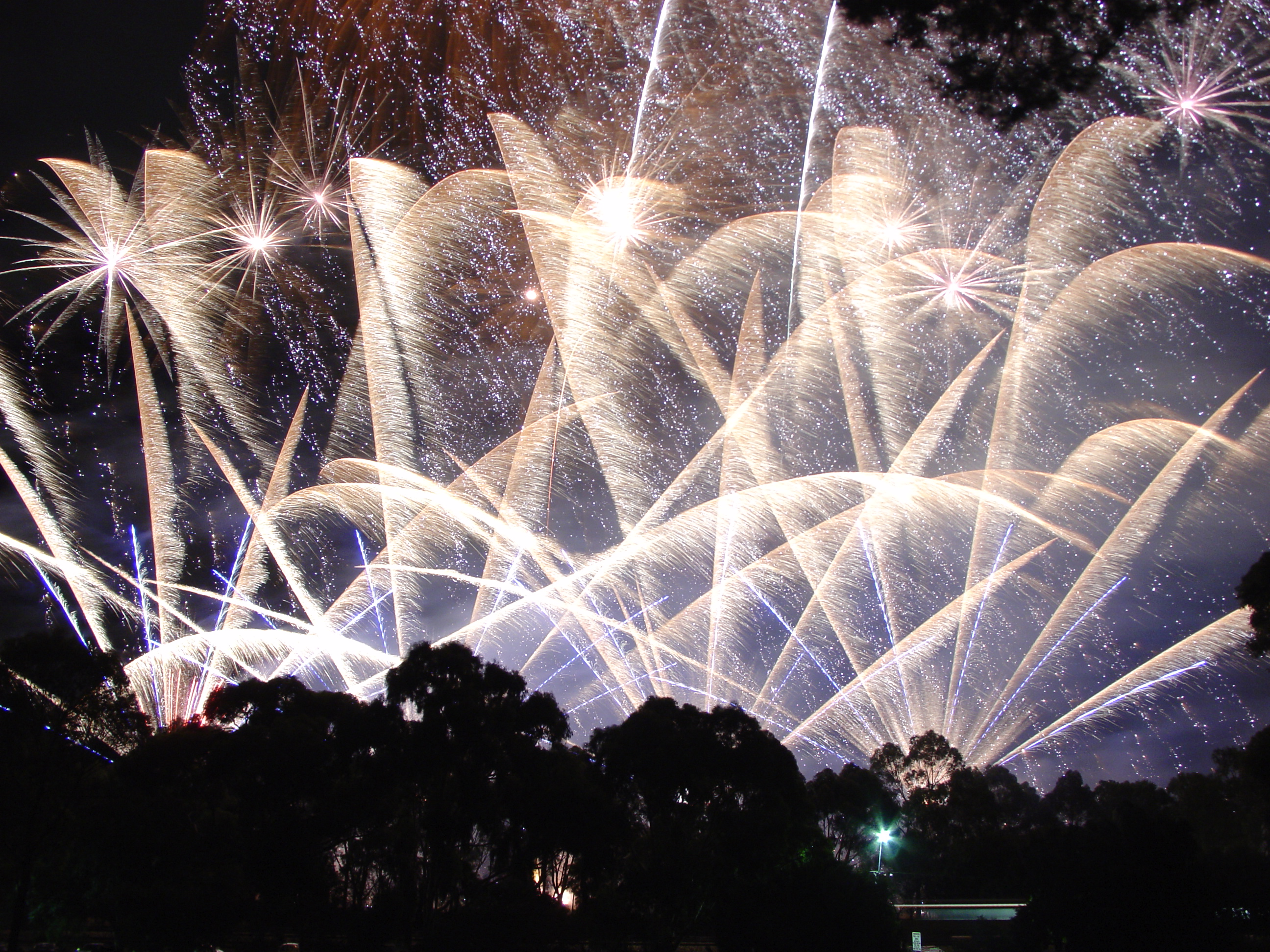
View from North Adelaide Golf Course, 2006

Skyshow was an annual fireworks event held in Adelaide, South Australia, from 1985 to 2006. The half-hour fireworks display was synchronised to rock and pop music and presented by local commercial radio station SAFM. Originating as an Australia Day celebration, the event was subsequently moved to late summer, usually February.

Sister events were also held at Albert Park Lake in Melbourne, Australia and sponsored by Fox FM (Melbourne) and on Sydney Harbour by 2Day FM.

Although, faced with serious financial difficulties in the late 1990s until rescued by the South Australian Government, it is estimated some 150,000 people attended the main festivities in Bonython Park, while many more watch from vantage points along the Adelaide Hills. The event ceased in 2006 after failing to secure funding for 2007.

After a large public campaign on social networking site Facebook for the event to return, the Skyshow returned on 13 March 2010 as part of the annual Adelaide 500 event.
