= Vine Vale, South Australia =

Locality in South Australia

Vine Vale South Australia
- Coordinates: 34.52°S 139.01°E
- Population: 90 (SAL 2021)
- Postcode(s): 5352
- Location: 4 km (2 mi) east of Tanunda; 3 km (2 mi) north of Bethany
- LGA(s): Barossa Council
- State electorate(s): Schubert
- Federal division(s): Barker
Localities around Vine Vale:
	Nuriootpa
Tanunda	Vine Vale	Angaston
	Bethany

Vine Vale is a locality in the Barossa Valley region of South Australia. The Rocky Valley Congregational Church was built from wattle and daub at Vine Vale around 1865 and replaced by a stone building in 1894. It closed in 1952. The locality still has an active tennis club.
