= Bonython Park =

Park in Adelaide, Australia

- Part of Tulya Wardli
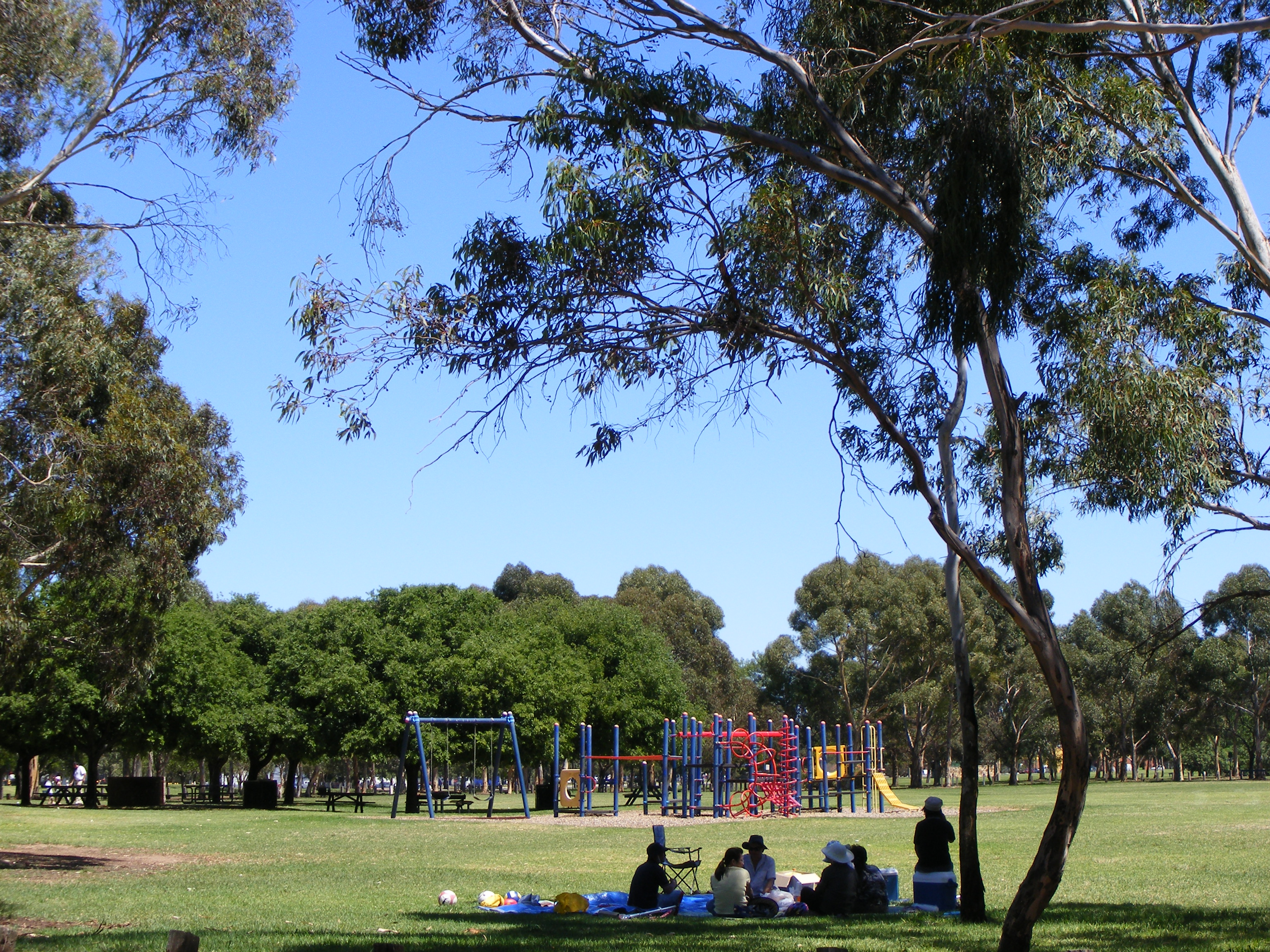
- Bonython Park picnic

- Location within City of Adelaide
- Interactive map of Bonython Park
- Type: Park
- Location: North Adelaide, South Australia
- Coordinates: 34°55′02″S 138°34′51″E
- Created: 1837

Bonython Park is a 17-hectare park in the north-west Park Lands of the South Australian capital of Adelaide. The park was opened in 1962 and named in honour of prominent South Australian politician and journalist, Sir John Langdon Bonython. It is situated on the north-western side of the River Torrens, bordered by Port Road. It is on the opposite side of the river to a golf course, and adjacent to the old Adelaide Gaol and the Police Barracks.

Bonython Park forms part of what is known as Park 27, and since the dual naming initiative by Adelaide City Council in the early 2000s, Park 27 is also known as Tulya Wardli. There are sites straddling this park and Park 1/ Pirltawardli of some significance to the Kaurna people, since various "native locations" were established on the sites dating from 1837, when the first settlers arrived and the establishment of a Christian mission in the following year.

== History ==
There is some evidence to suggest that there was a billabong on the site, used as a fishing spot for the Kaurna people prior to European settlement. Following the arrival of European settlers from 1837, right through to 1914, it was used as a watering place for cattle.

The site of Bonython Park was the first area occupied by Europeans, from January to March 1837. The migrants camped in tents and wooden huts in two camps, called Buffalo and Coromandel, after two of the ships of the First Fleet of South Australia.

After 1837, the so-called “Native Location” was established for local Kaurna people. Bromley’s Camp, the first of these, was established in April 1837 by Captain Walter Bromley, the second interim Protector of Aborigines, on land that is now part of Bonython Park. In reality, it was little more than a rations distribution point. In August 1837, William Wyatt became the next Protector, and created a more permanent settlement south of the river.

In October 1838 two German missionaries, Christian Teichelmann and Clamor Schürmann (and later Samuel Klose) arrived, setting themselves up at what became known as the "Old Location", studying the Kaurna language and teaching in that language. This was the first mission in South Australia. In 1839 the Native Location was moved again, across to the north side of the river, on what is now part of the Par 3 golf course. This was called the Pirltawardli (now the second name for Park 1 of the Park Lands), which means "possum place", also known as the "Aboriginal Location".

In December 1840 a school opened, supported by Governor George Gawler, but the site was dismantled in 1845, on the orders of Governor George Grey, who thought it best to take the children away from their parents, and a new "Native School" run by the government, which taught only in English, was established near what is now Kintore Avenue. (The Native School closed in 1851, with the remaining children were taken to Poonindie Mission at Port Lincoln on the Eyre Peninsula.

A few people continued to camp near the house of Klose, the only remaining missionary, at the site known as Pirltawardli. In 1846 the government build some brick sheds in part of this area, and also across the river behind the new Adelaide Gaol. One was for the "Murray tribe", who had moved to the area, and a smaller number of sheds for what was left of the "Adelaide tribe".

Pirltawardli, just across the river and straddling Parks 1 and 27, is still of great significance to Kaurna people, as well as non-Indigenous South Australians. Nearly all of the recorded language and early written records of Kaurna culture stem from this place, documented by the missionaries, who also shared their views on race relations in the new colony. On 26 May 2000 a plaque was erected there commemorating its place in Adelaide’s history.

== Description ==
Bonython Park, part of Park 27/Tudla Wardli, has many points of interest and recreation within and nearby.

The park hosts or has hosted several major events including the Schützenfest (a German shooting festival), the former Skyshow fireworks display, and various music festivals including Soundwave, Stereosonic and the Big Day Out. It is also the location of various visiting circuses, including Cirque du Soleil.

The Bonython Park Adventure Playspace, a kiosk), a model boat pond, open kick/play fields, a junior playground and multi-barbecue stations are available for the public.

The "Magic Forest & Native Bee N Bee Project" is a grove of mixed eucalyptus trees planted in 1997 by the Children’s Peaceful Environment Foundation in conjunction with the Council. It includes a native bee hotel.

The Roma Mitchell Garden, tended by prisoners until the closure of the jail, has since the 1990s been maintained by the Catholic Order of Malta.

== Tram stop ==
Bonython Park is also the location of a stop on the Glenelg tram line.

Preceding station	Adelaide Metro	Following station
Adelaide Entertainment Centre Terminus	Glenelg tram line Limited service	Thebarton towards Moseley Square or Botanic Gardens

== See also ==
- List of Adelaide parks and gardens
- Torrens Bridge railway station
