= Australische Zeitung =

Australian German-language newspaper, 1860-1916

The Australische Zeitung was a weekly German-language newspaper published in Tanunda, South Australia from 1860 until it ceased publication in 1916 due to anti-German sentiment during World War I. The newspaper also existed in a variety of earlier names or merged publications, reflecting the fluid nature of the newspaper industry in Victorian gold rush era colonial South Australia. The long history of German language Australian newspapers reflects the considerable German-speaking population which settled in South Australia in the nineteenth century.

== History ==
=== Suedaustralische Zeitung ===
Die Deutsche Post für die Australischen Colonien, first published c. 6 January 1848, and still appearing every Thursday in 1850, was the first German-language newspaper published in South Australia, and possibly in Australia. A rival, the Suedaustralische Zeitung was first published in Adelaide late 1849 by Otto Schomburgk and Carl Muecke and by Gustav Droege, who also acted as editor. It was remarkable in its day for being printed in Roman type (and replacing umlauts with their two-letter equivalents) "as if to indicate its rejection of tradition" (or perhaps being the only typeface available), and was radical in its political views.

The following year it was printed in traditional black letter type as Südaustralische Zeitung, and the editor's name written as Gustav Dröge. The paper was initially printed by Andrew Murray in Adelaide, and had sales outlets in Tanunda, Lyndoch, Hahndorf, Lobethal, Burra Burra, and Macclesfield. The paper was taken over by Wilhelm Eggers in September 1851 and published at the offices of the South Australian Register. Production ceased due to the negative economic conditions caused in South Australia by the Victorian gold rush.

=== Süd Australische Zeitung ===
The Süd Australische Zeitung was sold in 1859 to Rudolf Reimer, founder in April 1851 of the Adelaider Deutsche Zeitung (1851–1862), (printed with Roman type, considered by one commentator as conceding an advantage to its rival) but continued publication in Tanunda as a separate title. Reimer died in April 1860. It was taken over in January 1860 by C. H. Barton, a prominent Tanunda citizen, as editor and owner, but the paper floundered, with a circulation of just 400. It was in late 1862 sold to Basedow, Barton, and Eimer, trading as George Eimer & Co. (later Basedow, Eimer & Co.). Contrary to promises and expectations, they immediately moved production from Tanunda to Adelaide. It was taken over in 1863 by Wilhelm Eggers and Eimer and published in Adelaide, and achieved a circulation of 1,500. Barton and Basedow retaliated with a new Tanunda publication, the Tanunda Deutsche Zeitung, edited by Muecke. Barton was later to become bankrupt and in 1867 fled to Maryborough, Queensland, owing substantial sums to his Tanunda backers.

A special entertainment insert, called Australisches Unterhaltungsblatt (1862–1916), was included as well. From 1862 it was subtitled "Belletristische Beilage zur Süd-Australische Zeitung" then "Belletristische Beilage zur Australischen Zeitung" from 1875.

=== Australische Zeitung ===
In 1874 the rival German language newspapers of Adelaide and Tanunda once again merged as the Australische Zeitung, under publishers Basedow, Eimer & Co. (Frederick Basedow and George Eimer); and Dr. Muecke was appointed editor. The first edition under the new title was on 5 January 1875. In 1876 they absorbed the Neue Deutsche Zeitung, a competing paper published by G. C. L. and F. A. Reiger, and J. W. A. Sudholz. The paper was regularly advertised in the Mount Barker Courier.

(Johann) August Ludwig Kayser (died c. 20 February 1910) who arrived in Adelaide on the Grasbruch in 1860, married Cecilie Catharine Amalie Beecken in 1862, and was for a time headmaster of the Lyndoch Valley and Brighton schools, was on the paper's literary staff.

Negative public sentiment during the Great War against the use of the German language (or German place-names) in South Australia led to demands in 1915 that the newspaper be closed or forced to discontinue printing in German. The paper's final edition was on Wednesday, 15 March 1916. Despite this, there could have been little to criticise regarding their loyalty to Australia:

"We do not protest against the frequent messages about the successes of the Belgians, French, and Russians because the sooner victory is gained the sooner there will be an end to the present shocking murder. What does cause our blood to boil is the cables alleging terrible and infamous actions and conduct on the part of the Germans; if there were only a grain of truth in them it would make us sink into the earth for shame that we are of German descent."

The newspaper was finally revived on 2 June 1927 in Tanunda, albeit on a smaller scale, but it ceased production again on 4 July 1929.

== Digitisation ==
Issues have been digitised from photographic copies by the National Library of Australia, and may be retrieved using Trove.

- Suedaustralische Zeitung (Adelaide, SA : 1850 - 1851) at Trove
- Süd Australische Zeitung (Tanunda and Adelaide, SA : 1860 - 1874) at Trove
- Australische Zeitung (Adelaide, SA : 1875 - 1916) at Trove
