= The South Australian =

Newspaper

The South Australian was a newspaper published in Adelaide, the capital of colonial South Australia from 2 June 1838 to 19 August 1851. Between 1838 and 1844, it was published as The Southern Australian.

== History ==
=== The Southern Australian ===
The Southern Australian was founded by the Crown Solicitor, Charles Mann, and James Hurtle Fisher. The printer was Tasmanian Archibald Macdougall and James Allen was the editor; they had offices in Rundle Street, perhaps on Allotment 45 on the north side, towards King William Street.

The newspaper was founded as an opposition to South Australia's first newspaper, the South Australian Gazette and Colonial Register, edited by George Stevenson. As private secretary to Governor John Hindmarsh (as well as holding a number of other government appointments) Stevenson espoused a strong party line in the pages of The Register. He was also notoriously outspoken against those who disagreed with Governor Hindmarsh, and was taken to court many times for libel, and even once was attacked in the street by Robert Torrens in response to his articles. A clear aim of the newspaper was to provide a different perspective to The Register. The new publication incorporated the Government Gazette, a useful source of revenue and guarantee of circulation previously held by The Register.

It is needless to shew that up to this time we have had no Free Press in the Colony. It will on all hands be admitted that one Journal devoted to sectional interests in the community, does not realize the idea entertained of a Free Press. ... We have had indeed a pernicious and corrupting monopoly.

The founding of The Southern Australian carried the stated support of prominent early colonists, including William Light, Robert Gouger, John Barton Hack, BT Finniss and John Morphett. Although its stated purpose was to provide more balanced news reporting in the infant colony, a second aim was clearly to also give a very critical analysis of the news reporting of the rival newspaper.

The Register of last Saturday informed the public, that upwards of twenty persons were buried in the Cemetery during the previous week, and that they had principally died from the slow fever, which it reported was prevalent. The truth is, that only four or five persons have been buried during the last few weeks ... The slow fever, of course, is equally apocryphal. We cannot suppose the Editor such an idiot as to publish a statement of this kind knowingly. We charitably presume it to be a very cruel hoax, to which system our solemn brother seems to be peculiarly subject.

The Southern Australian was a mixture of advertisements for the city auctioneers, the expanding mines at Burra and Kapunda, the Queen's Theatre and local shops; together with long court reports and news from Britain and the other Australian colonies. A 'local news' column covered South Australian news. Local horse racing was well represented in its pages.

Initially the newspaper was published weekly on a Saturday, then Wednesdays from 9 January 1839, and Thursdays from 12 December 1839, at the price of sixpence per four-page issue (perhaps $30.00 in today's values); six pages from 30 January 1840. From May 1840 it became bi-weekly, published on Tuesdays and Fridays at sixpence for four pages. The original editor, James Allen, left in 1842 when he purchased the Register.

=== The South Australian ===
In 1844 the proprietor, Richard Blackham, sold the newspaper to Andrew Murray, who changed the newspaper's title to The South Australian, but without any interruption to the publication numbering. In July 1851 the newspaper became weekly again and the following month it ceased altogether. This was probably due to the rush to the Victorian gold fields, when South Australia lost much of its male work force and the colony suffered an economic downturn.

== Digitisation ==
The National Library of Australia has digitised photographic copies of The Southern Australian as part of its Australian Newspapers Digitisation Project.
