= Adelaider Deutsche Zeitung =

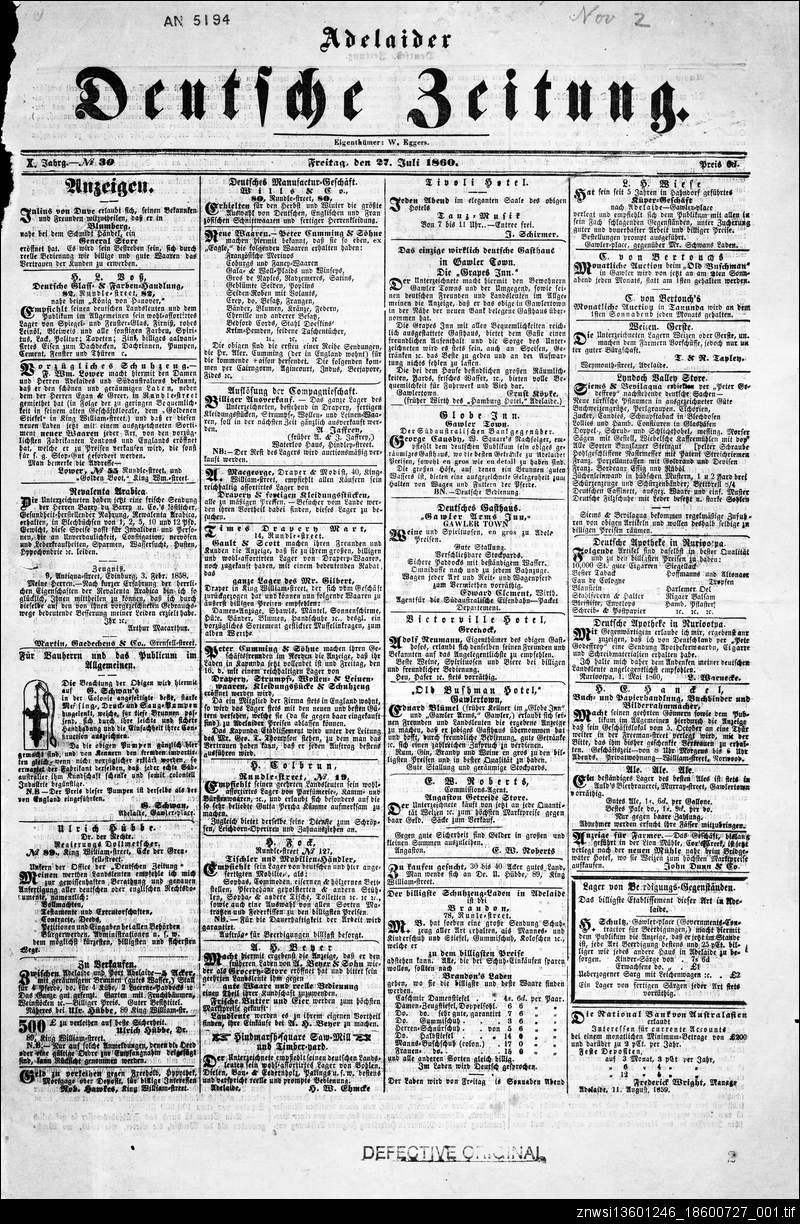
Adelaider Deutsche Zeitung, 27 July 1860, p. 1

The Adelaider Deutsche Zeitung was a German language newspaper published in Adelaide, capital of the Colony of South Australia from 1851 to 1862.

== History ==
The Adelaider Deutsche Zeitung was established by Rudolf Reimer (died 1860), and first appeared in April 1851, printed at the offices of Andrew Murray's South Australian. The newspaper included reports of colonial politics, something that was not typical in the German-Australian press at the time. Like many of its contemporaries, this newspaper folded during the gold rush of the early 1850s, but was resurrected in 1853. No copies have survived for this second period. Karl Friedrich Wilhelm Eggers, formerly of the South Australian Register, purchased the newspaper in 1855. This was the first German language newspaper to publish an entertainment supplement – Blätter für Ernst und Scherz.

== Preservation ==
This newspaper title has been preserved on microfilm by the State Library of South Australia. Microfilms served as the basis for digitisation by the Australian Newspaper Digitisation Project of the National Library of Australia.

== See also ==
- Australische Zeitung
- List of newspapers in Australia
