= Mengler Hill =

Hill in Australia

Coordinates: 34°32′15″S 139°00′19″E

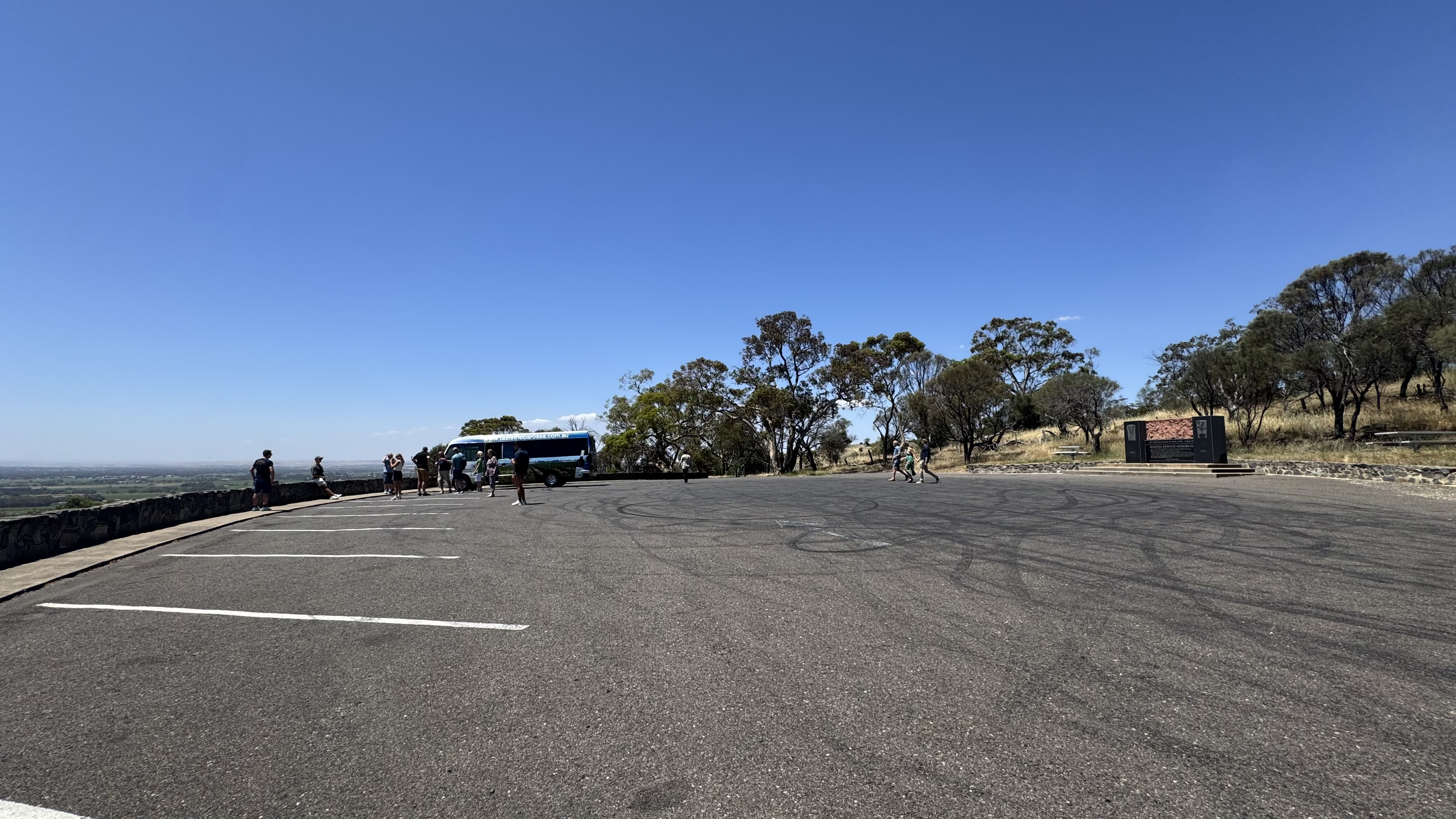
Mengler Hill Lookout

Mengler Hill (formerly Mengler's Hill) is a hill and popular lookout in the Barossa Range, South Australia. The hill was named after an early wine grower in the area. The Barossa Sculpture Park is sited at the base of the lookout area. The road route from Tanunda to Angaston crosses Mengler Hill.

== See also ==
- Barossa Valley
