= Tanunda, South Australia =

Tanunda
- Town
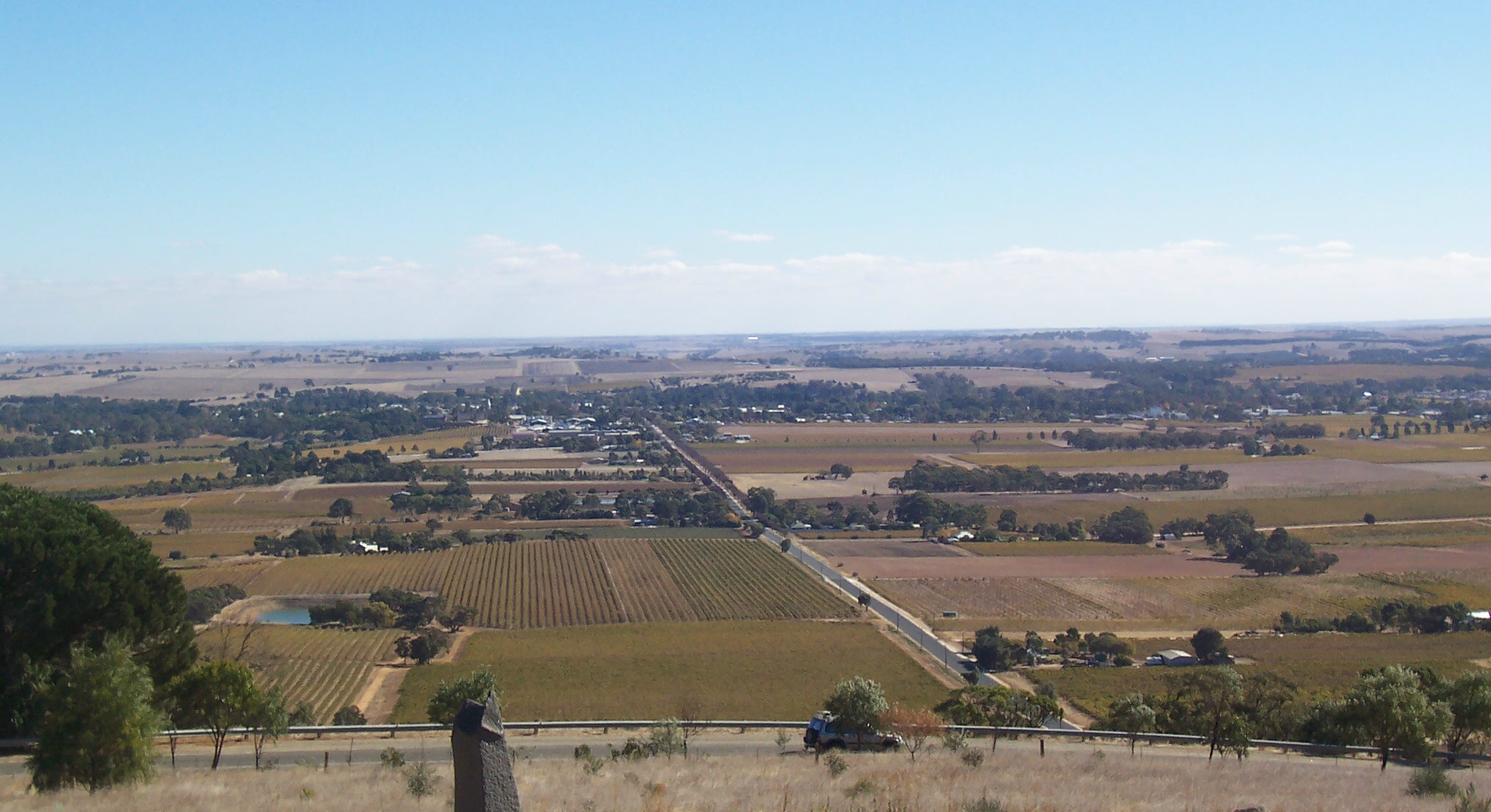
- Looking across the vineyards towards Tanunda from Mengler Hill Lookout

- Coordinates: 34°31′0″S 138°58′0″E
- Country: Australia
- State: South Australia
- LGA: Barossa Council
- Location: 69 km (43 mi) North East of Adelaide via
- Established: 1848

Government
  - State electorate: Schubert
  - Federal division: Barker

Population
  - Total: 4,710 (2021 census)
- Postcode: 5352
- Localities around Tanunda
| Stone Well; Marananga | Nuriootpa | Angaston |
| Seppeltsfield | Tanunda | Vine Vale |
| Gomersal | Rowland Flat | Bethany; Krondorf |

Tanunda is a town situated in the Barossa Valley region of South Australia. At the 2021 census, Tanunda recorded a population of 4,710 people.

== Geography ==
Tanunda is located 66 kilometres (41 mi) north-east of the state capital, Adelaide.

== History ==
The town derives its name from an Aboriginal word meaning water hole, or 'wild fowl on creek.'

Tanunda was established as a village by Charles Flaxman, circa 1848.

In 1856, gold was reported at Tanunda Creek.

Prussian immigrants who arrived with Pastor Gotthard Fritzsche founded the village of Bethanien in 1842, the first settlement in the vicinity of today's Tanunda. One year later, Prussians relocating from Klemzig on the Torrens River, where they had settled upon immigrating in 1838 with Pastor August Kavel, came to the Barossa Valley and founded the village of Langmeil. Their new community bore the name of a Prussian town near Zullichau, from where the settlers had originated; it is now a Polish village known as Okunin. Sometime later, another village was founded and named Tanunda. Due to anti-German sentiments, both Langmeil and Bethanien were renamed during the Great War to Bilyara and Bethany respectively, although Bilyara reverted to Langmeil in 1975. As development of the Tanunda area continued, the villages of Langmeil and Tanunda were joined. Today the township is simply called Tanunda.

== Demographics ==
In the 1986 census, Tanunda recorded a population of 2,856 people.

In the 2016 census, Tanunda recorded a population of 4,588 people, 51.3% female and 48.7% male. The median age of the Tanunda population was 47 years, 9 years above the national median of 38. 83.4% of people living in Tanunda were born in Australia. The other top responses for country of birth were England 4.5%, Germany 0.8%, New Zealand 0.8%, Scotland 0.6% and the Netherlands 0.3%. 91.6% of people spoke only English at home; the next most common languages were 0.9% German, 0.4% Mandarin, 0.2% Italian, 0.2% Latvian and 0.1% Gujarati.

In the 2021 census, Tanunda recorded a population of 4,710 people, 51.4% female and 48.6% male. The median age of the Tanunda population was 48 years, 10 years above the national median of 38. 85.0% of people living in Tanunda were born in Australia. The other top responses for country of birth were England 4.4%, New Zealand 1.0%, Germany 0.9%, Scotland 0.6%, and South Africa 0.4%. 93.2% of people spoke only English at home; the next most common languages were 0.7% German, 0.4% Mandarin, 0.2% Hindi, 0.1% Nepali, and 0.1% Spanish.

== Industry ==
Tanunda and the Barossa Valley comprise one of Australia's premier wine-growing areas, and the town is surrounded by vineyards. One such vineyard, Turkey Flat, is home to Shiraz vines that were planted in 1847 and are believed to be the world's oldest continually producing commercial vineyard that has been authenticated.

== Culture ==
The German heritage of Tanunda is still present today. The town has a male choir the Tanunda Liedertafel, the history of which is thought to date back to 1850. There is also a Kegel (bowling) club. The Tanunda Town Band celebrated 150 years as a band in 2007 and is the oldest brass band in the Southern Hemisphere. Tanunda served as the launching point for the Nazi party's effort to expand in Australia in the 1930s.

== Media ==
Historically, Tanunda (and Adelaide) was the home to a number of the earliest South Australian newspapers that were printed primarily in German. German newspapers were set up by early settlers, but many were forced to close or merge due to labour shortages caused by the Victorian gold rush of the 1850s-1860s.

- Deutsche Zeitung für Süd-Australien (1851)
- Süd Australische Zeitung (1860–1874) - Tanunda/Adelaide
- Australisches Unterhaltungsblatt (1862-1916) - a supplement to the Süd Australische Zeitung and Australische Zeitung
- Tanunda Deutsche Zeitung (1863-1869) - later renamed Australische Deutsche Zeitung
- Australische Deutsche Zeitung (1870-1874) - Tanunda/Adelaide: a Melbourne edition of the newspaper was also printed 1870–1872.
- Australische Zeitung (1875–1916) - Tanunda/Adelaide: formed by the merger of Süd Australische Zeitung, and Australische Deutsche Zeitung; closed due to WWI
- Australische Zeitung (1927-1929) - attempted revival

Two weekly English-language newspapers served the area:

- The Leader, has been operating in the area since 1918.
- The Barossa and Light Herald from 1951, though its antecedents date from 1860.

== See also ==
- Adelaide Liedertafel
- Barossa Deutsch
