= List of Martin Luther University of Halle-Wittenberg people =

A list of Martin Luther University of Halle-Wittenberg people, from Martin Luther University Halle-Wittenberg in Germany.

== A ==
- Thomas Abbt
- Otto Ferdinand von Abensberg und Traun
- Hermann Abert
- Erasmus Alberus
- Anton Wilhelm Amo
- Nicolaus von Amsdorf
- Abraham Angermannus
- Johann Arndt
- Ludwig Achim von Arnim
- Gottfried Arnold
- Gustav Aschaffenburg
- Matthäus Aurogallus

== B ==
- Wilhelm Friedemann Bach
- Johann Bachstrom
- Ernst Gottfried Baldinger
- Caspar Bartholin the Elder
- Anton de Bary
- Karl Adolph von Basedow
- Emil Adolf von Behring
- August Immanuel Bekker
- Gottfried Bernhardy
- Julius Bernstein
- Willibald Beyschlag
- Jan Blahoslav
- Friedrich Blass
- August Böckh
- Julius Oscar Brefeld
- Barthold Heinrich Brockes
- Heinrich Brandt
- Theodor Brugsch
- Giordano Bruno
- Ernest I, Duke of Brunswick-Lüneburg
- August Buchner
- Johann Franz Buddeus
- Johann Christian Buxbaum

== C ==
- Joachim Camerarius
- Johann Heinrich Callenberg
- Georg Cantor
- Martin Chemnitz
- Johannes Clajus
- Hermann Cohen
- Alexander Conze
- Valerius Cordus
- Caspar Cruciger the Younger
- Caspar Cruciger the Elder
- Johann Crüger

== D ==
- Friedrich Christoph Dahlmann
- Daniel Dahm
- Richard Walther Darré
- Friedrich Dedekind
- Christoph Demantius
- Gábor Döbrentei
- Johann Gabriel Doppelmayr
- Friedrich Ernst Dorn
- Ernst Christoph Dressler
- Ernst Dümmler
- Maximilian Wolfgang Duncker
- Kurt Diebner

== E ==
- Johann August Eberhard
- Martin Eichler
- Johann Sigismund Elsholtz
- Karl Elze
- Francisco de Enzinas
- Johann Eduard Erdmann
- Johann August Ernesti
- Johann Samuel Ersch
- Dorothea Erxleben

== F ==
- Justus Falckner
- Georg Forster
- August Hermann Francke
- Georg Franck von Franckenau
- Bengt Gottfried Forselius
- Christopher Marlowe's Doctor Faustus (in fiction)

== G ==
- Nicolaus Gallus
- Hans Dietrich Genscher
- Scipione Gentili
- Johann Gerhard
- Paul Gerhardt
- Wilhelm Gesenius
- Heinrich Ernst Ferdinand Guericke
- Albrecht Giese
- Johann Wilhelm Ludwig Gleim
- Rudolph Goclenius
- Johann Nikolaus Götz
- Alfred Carl Graefe
- Friedrich Albrecht Carl Gren
- Johann Jakob Griesbach
- Julius Waldemar Grosse
- Johann Gottfried Gruber
- Gottlieb Sigmund Gruner
- Jan Gruter
- Simon Grynaeus
- Erich Gutenberg

== H ==
- Johann Habermann
- Monika Harms
- Horatio Balch Hackett
- Rudolf Haym
- Rudolf Heidenhain
- Hermann Theodor Hettner
- Friedrich Heinrich von der Hagen
- Patrick Hamilton (martyr)
- Georg Frideric Handel
- William Shakespeare's Hamlet (in fiction)
- Gottlieb Christoph Harless
- Christian August Hausen
- Sven Hedin
- Christian Friedrich Henrici
- Gustav Ludwig Hertz
- Christian Gottlob Heyne
- Adolf Bernhard Christoph Hilgenfeld
- Ferdinand Hitzig
- Erich Hoffmann
- Anton Ludwig Ernst Horn
- Eugen Huber
- Gottlieb Hufeland
- Gustav Hugo
- Nicolaus Hunnius
- Hermann Hupfeld
- John Fletcher Hurst
- Edmund Husserl
- Leonhard Hutter

== I ==
- Karl Leberecht Immermann
- Nitobe Inazō

== J ==
- Friedrich Ludwig Jahn
- Ludwig Heinrich von Jakob
- Jeremiah Jenks
- Jan Jesenius
- Paulus Juusten

== K ==
- Saul Isaac Kaempf
- Andreas Karlstadt
- Karl Wilhelm Gottlob Kastner
- Bartholomäus Keckermann
- Petrus Kenicius
- Karl-Hermann Knoblauch
- Ernst Kohlschütter

== L ==
- Elsbeth Lange
- Heinrich Laube
- Johann Gottlob Lehmann
- Heinrich Leo
- Edwin Linkomies
- Christian Lobeck
- Otto Heinrich von Löben
- Johann Carl Gottfried Loewe
- Valentin Ernst Löscher
- Karl August Lossen
- Gottfried Christian Friedrich Lücke
- Martin Luther
- Paul Luther
- Cyprián Karásek Lvovický of Lvovice

== M ==
- Lucas Maius
- Johann Friedrich Meckel
- Johann David Michaelis
- Gustav Mie
- Friedrich de la Motte Fouqué
- Friedrich Mohs
- Joachim Mrugowsky (1905–1948), Nazi doctor executed for war crimes
- Julius Müller
- Lucian Müller
- Frederick Muhlenberg
- Henry Muhlenberg

== N ==
- Johann August Nauck
- August Neander
- Michael Neander
- Felix von Niemeyer
- Benedikt Niese
- Karl Immanuel Nitzsch

== O ==
- Adam Gottlob Oehlenschläger

== P ==
- Peter Simon Pallas
- Simon Patten
- Christiaan Hendrik Persoon
- Jöran Persson
- Olaus Petri
- Caspar Peucer
- Julius Plücker
- August Pott
- Johannes Praetorius
- Edmond de Pressensé
- Robert Prutz

== Q ==
- Johannes Andreas Quenstedt

== R ==
- Karl Wilhelm Ramler
- Werner Rauh
- Friedrich Ludwig Georg von Raumer
- Ernst Raupach
- Hermann Samuel Reimarus
- Erasmus Reinhold
- Johann Jakob Reiske
- Julius Reubke
- Edouard Guillaume Eugène Reuss
- Peter Riedel
- Eduard Karl August Riehm
- Albrecht Ritschl
- Lars Roberg
- Johann Karl Friedrich Rosenkranz
- David Ruhnken

== S ==
- Friedrich Carl von Savigny
- Nikolaus Selnecker
- Johann Andreas Segner
- Johann Salomo Semler
- Daniel Sennert
- Philip Schaff
- Max Scheler
- Valentin Schindler
- Diederich Franz Leonhard von Schlechtendal
- Friedrich Daniel Ernst Schleiermacher
- August Ludwig von Schlözer
- Franz Hermann Schulze-Delitzsch
- Max Schultze
- Karl Schwarz
- Veit Ludwig von Seckendorff
- George Spalatin
- Philipp Jakob Spener
- Oswald Spengler
- Walther Spielmeyer
- Curt Polycarp Joachim Sprengel
- Georg Ernst Stahl
- Hermann Staudinger
- Emmanuel Steinschneider
- Henrik Steffens
- Martin Stephan
- Rudolf Ewald Stier
- Count Friedrich Leopold zu Stolberg
- Johann Friedrich Struensee
- Aleksandras Stulginskis
- Carl Stumpf
- Annette Schmiedchen
- Stuart Parkin

== T ==
- Friedrich Tholuck
- Christian Thomasius
- Ludwig Tieck
- Jiří Třanovský
- Daniel Gottlob Türk

== U ==
- Hermann Ulrici
- Dimitri Uznadze

== V ==
- Karl August Varnhagen von Ense
- Abraham Vater
- Daniel Vorländer
- Hugo Marie de Vries

== W ==
- Wilhelm Eduard Weber
- Julius Wegscheider
- Hermann Welcker
- Julius Wellhausen
- Joachim Westphal (of Hamburg)
- Albert Wigand (meteorologist)
- Carl Ludwig Willdenow
- Johann Joachim Winckelmann
- Friedrich August Wolf
- Christian Wolff (philosopher)
- F. C. D. Wyneken

== Z ==
- Paul Zarifopol
- Caspar Ziegler
- Karl Ziegler
- Nicolaus Ludwig Zinzendorf
- Max Zorn
- Leopold Zunz.
