= Christian Albrecht Jensen =

Danish painter (1792–1870)

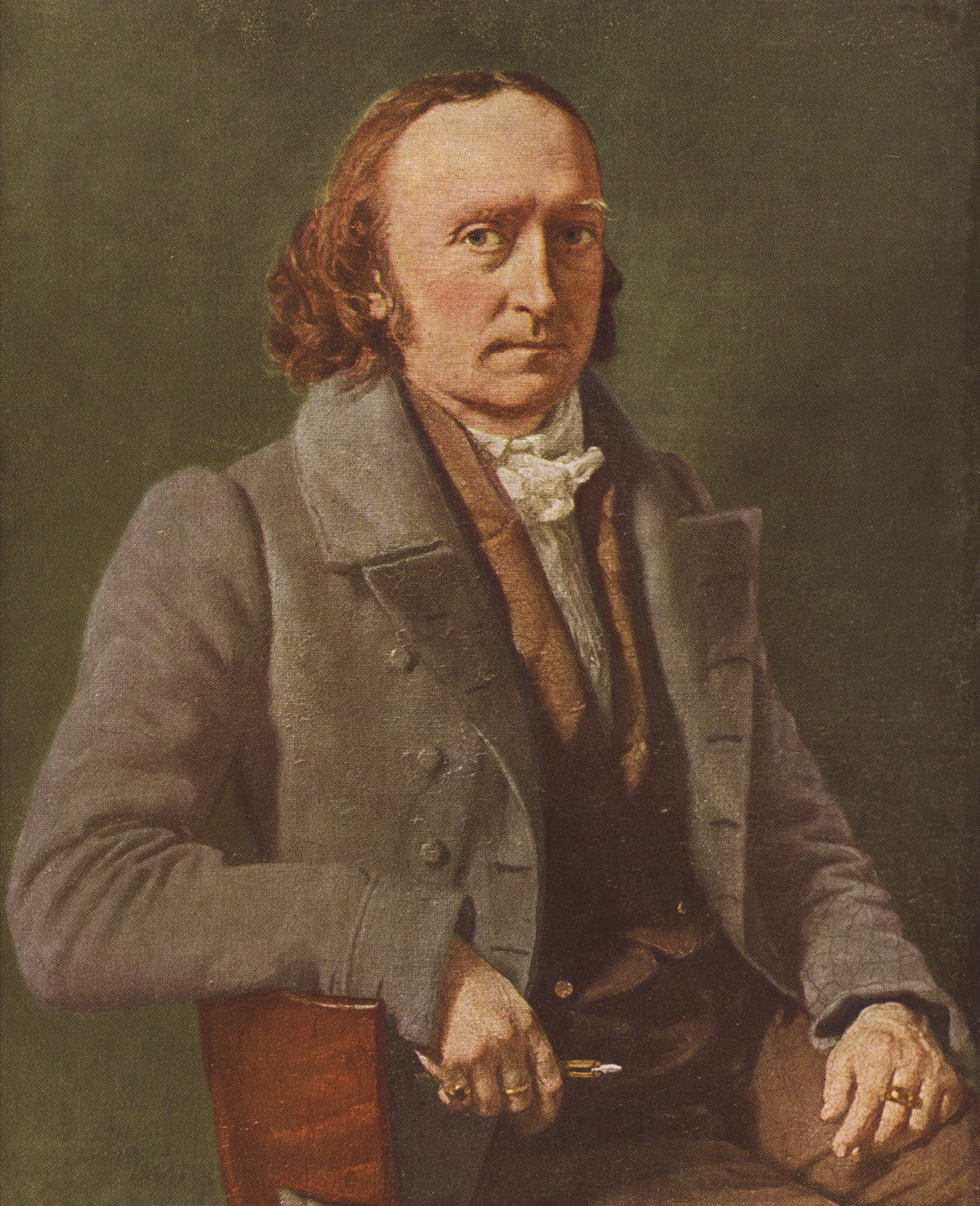
- Self-portrait, 1836
- Born: 26 June 1792; Bredstedt, Duchy of Schleswig
- Died: 13 July 1870 (aged 78); Copenhagen, Denmark
- Education: Royal Danish Academy of Fine Arts
- Known for: Painting
- Movement: Danish Golden Age

Christian Albrecht Jensen (26 June 1792 – 13 July 1870) was a Danish painter who specialised in portrait painting and was active during the Danish Golden Age. Painting more than 400 portraits over the course of his career, he depicted most of the leading figures of the Danish Golden Age, including the writer Hans Christian Andersen, the painter Christoffer Wilhelm Eckersberg, the sculptor Bertel Thorvaldsen, the physicist Hans Christian Ørsted and the theologian N. F. S. Grundtvig. Although Jensen experienced considerable commercial success, he received little official appreciation from the artistic establishment of his day. In particular, the art historian and critic Niels Lauritz Høyen criticized his style, finding his paintings 'unfinished'.

== Early life and education ==
Jensen was born at Bredstedt in Nordfriesland. From 1810 to 1816, he attended the Royal Danish Academy of Fine Arts in Copenhagen where he studied under Christian August Lorentzen. From 1817 to 1818, he studied at the Academy of Fine Arts in Dresden.

== Time abroad ==
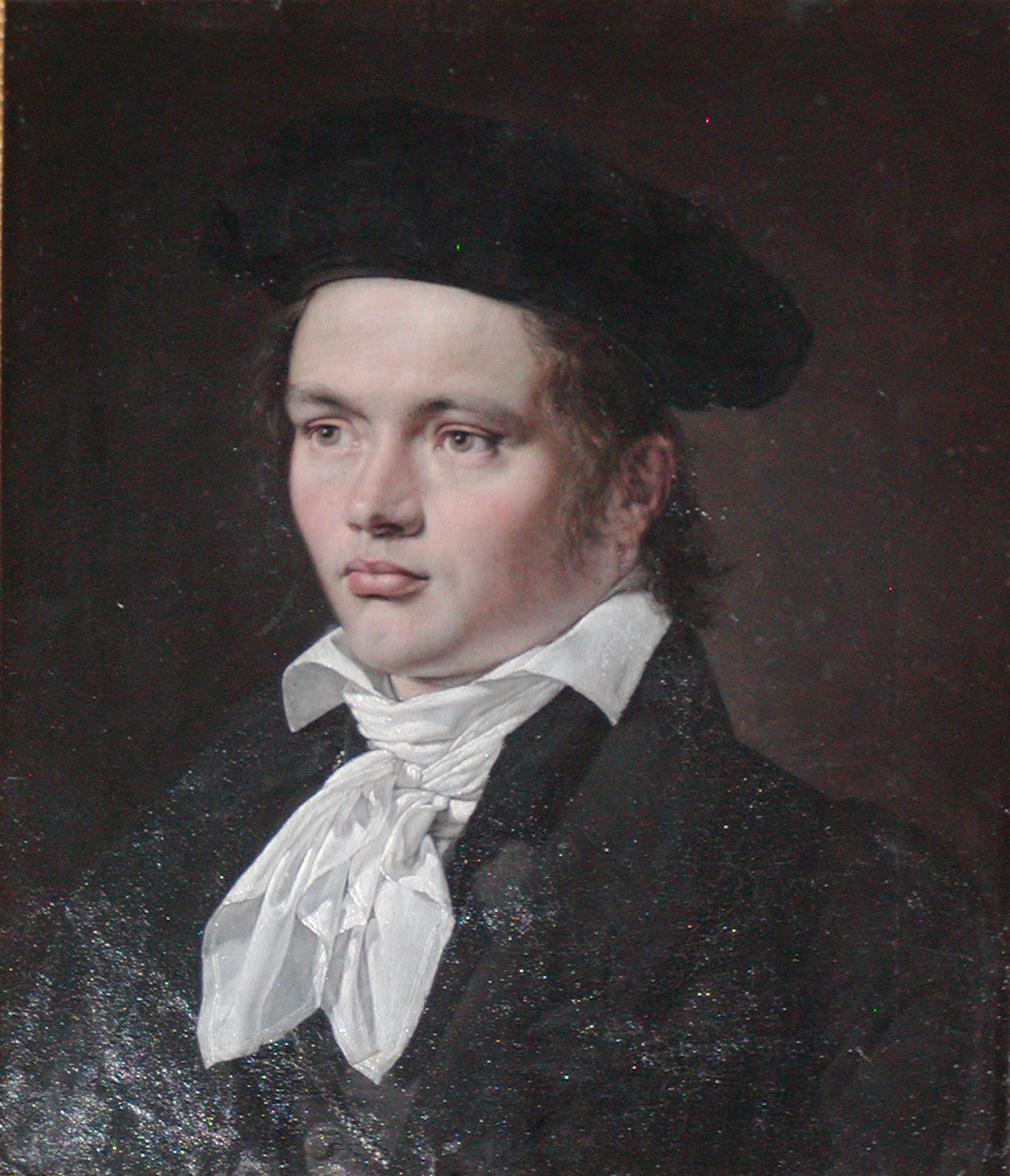
The sculptor H. E. Freund portrayed during Jensen's stay in Rome, 1818–20

In 1818, he traveled to Rome by way of Vienna, Venice, Bologna and Florence. When he arrived, he joined the large colony of Danish-German artists' who lived in the city at the time and also met the sculptor Bertel Thorvaldsen.

During his years in Rome, Jensen painted small, informal portraits of many of his fellow artists, including the writer Bernhard Severin Ingemann who visited Rome from 1818 to 1819, and the sculptor Hermann Ernst Freund, Thorvaldsen's closest associate from 1818 to 1828.

After leaving Rome, he made an unsuccessful attempt to establish himself as a portrait painter in Hamburg.

== Success and criticism ==
Back in Copenhagen in the winter of 1822/23, the portrait scene was dominated by Christoffer Wilhelm Eckersberg's sober, Neoclassical style, yet Jensen's more psychological portraits won immediate popularity. Up through the 1820s, he portrayed a large number of prominent members of Danish society but in spite of his commercial success he received little appreciation from art critics or from the establishment at the Academy and when a professorial chair became vacant after Christian August Lorentzen died in 1828 he was passed by.

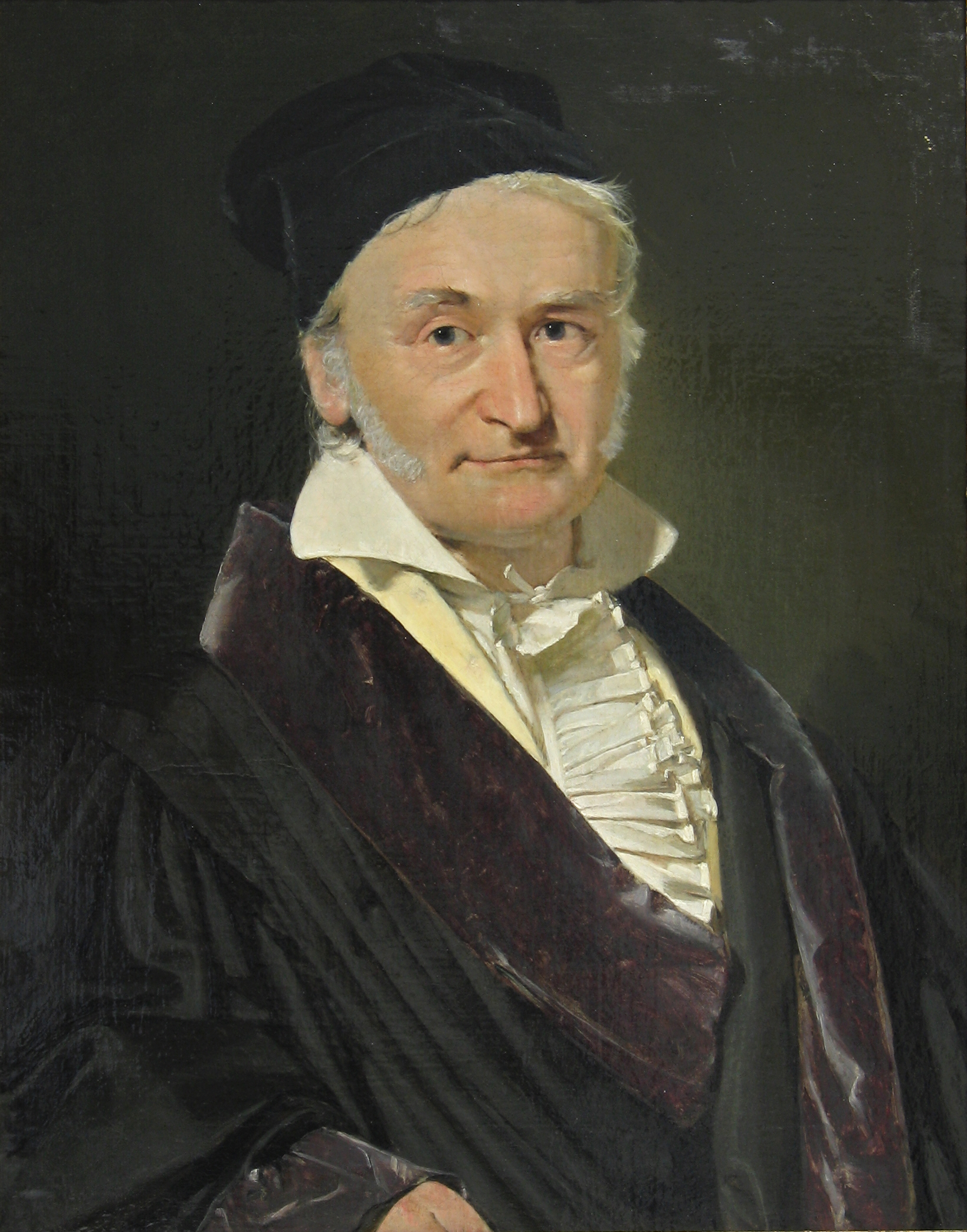
Carl Friedrich Gauss, 1840

After 1830, commissions dwindled and he experienced financial difficulties. In response, he started collaborating with the historical collections at Frederiksborg Castle, painting both copies of older pictures and originals. This led to a controversy with Niels Lauritz Høyen, an influential art historian and critic who, from the beginning, had been critical of his style, finding his pictures 'unfinished'.

From 1837, he increasingly looked to other countries for customers. By the Pulkovo Observatory, which opened near Saint Petersburg, he was commissioned to paint 11 portraits of leading international scientists. His painting of Carl Friedrich Gauss from that series remains the most famous portrait of the mathematician. Other portrayed scientists included the astronomer Wilhelm von Struve.

== Late life ==
The 1840s brought a further decline in orders, prompted by his political views which were not in line with the nationalist tendencies at the time as well as by continued criticism from Høyen. Eventually, after completing more than 400 portraits, he stopped painting. His last two works, portraits of Andreas Christian Krog (1854) and the theologian Andreas Gottlob Rudelbach, are considered to be among his best.

For the remainder of his life, he worked as an assistant at the Royal Print Collection and as a conservator, supplementing his income by selling paintings from his large art collection.

== Gallery ==
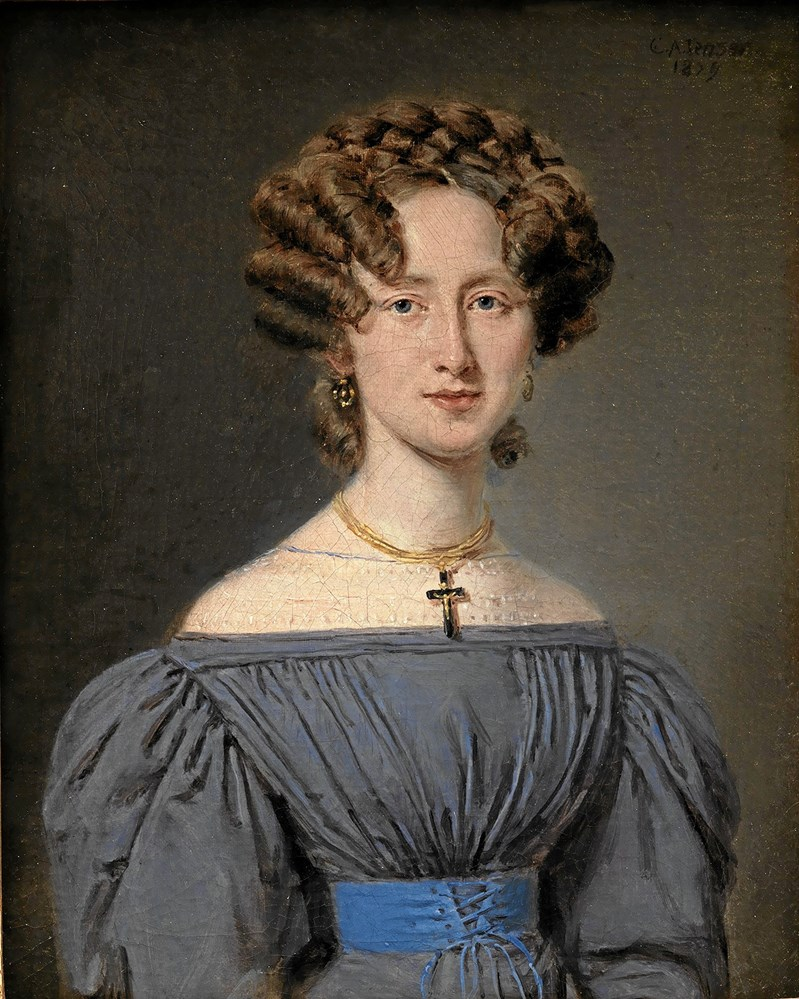
Cecilie Lønborg, 1819

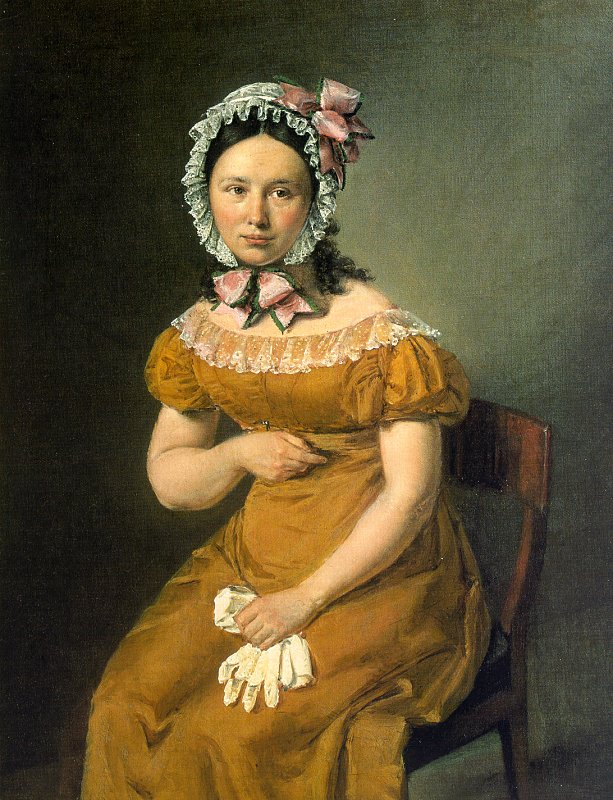
Cathrine Jensen (the artist's wife), 1825

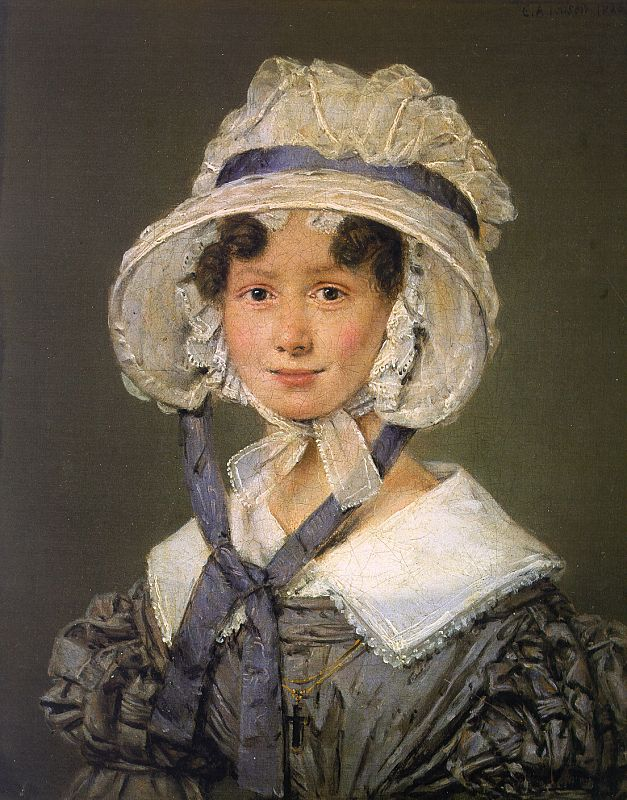
Birgitte Sobotker Hohlenberg, 1826

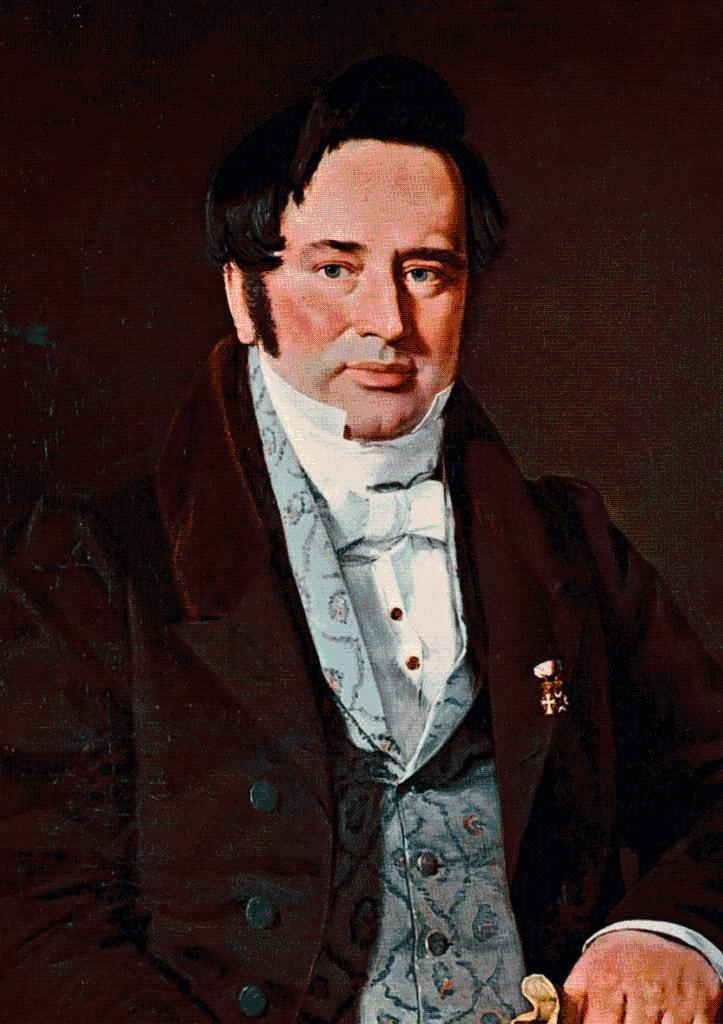
Adam Gottlob Oehlenschläger, 1832

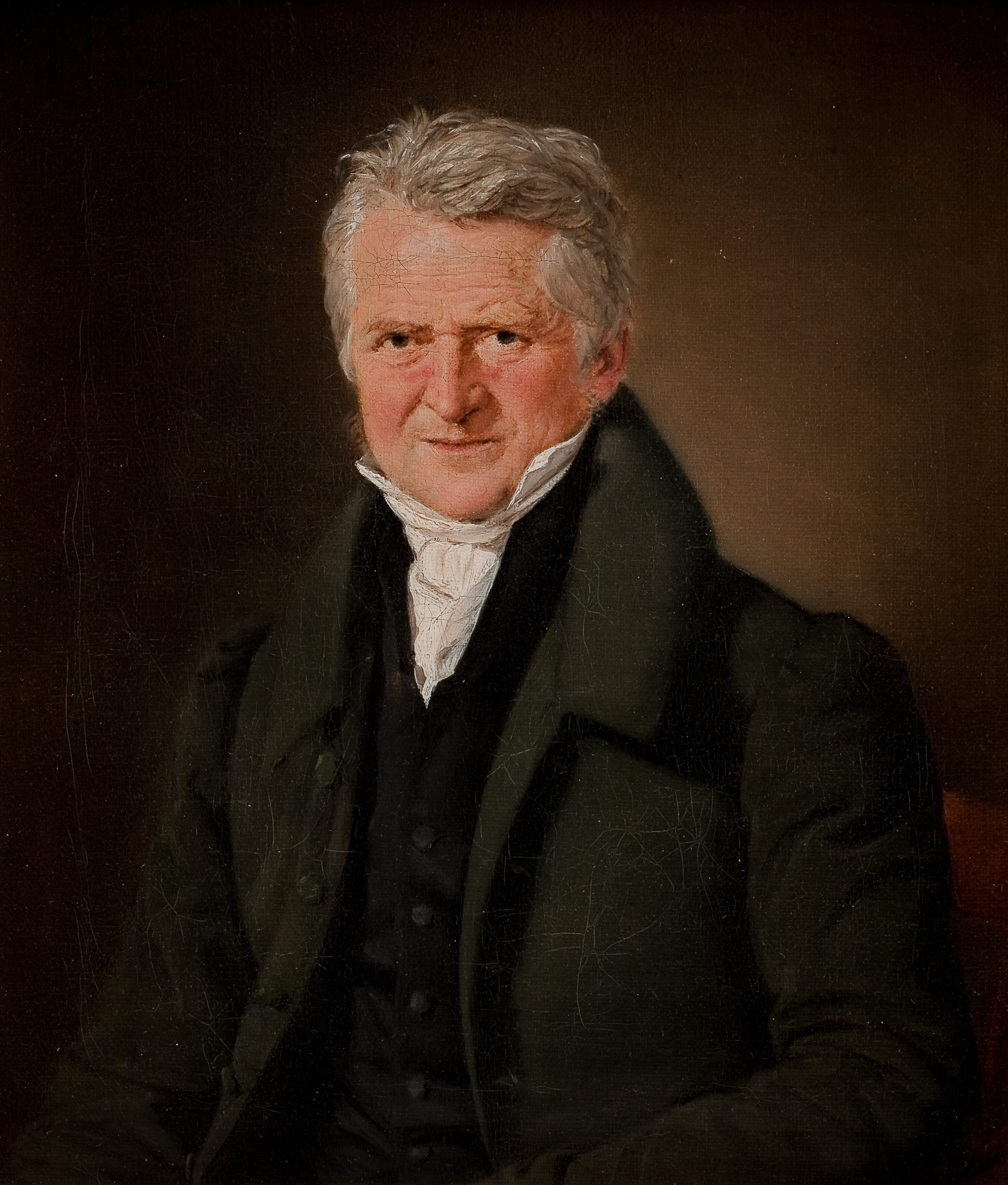
Christoffer Wilhelm Eckersberg, 1832

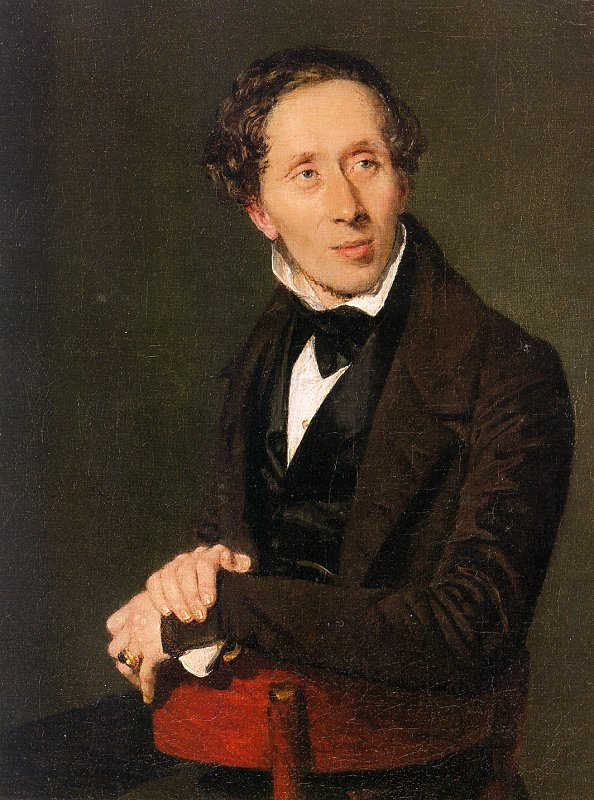
Hans Christian Andersen, 1836

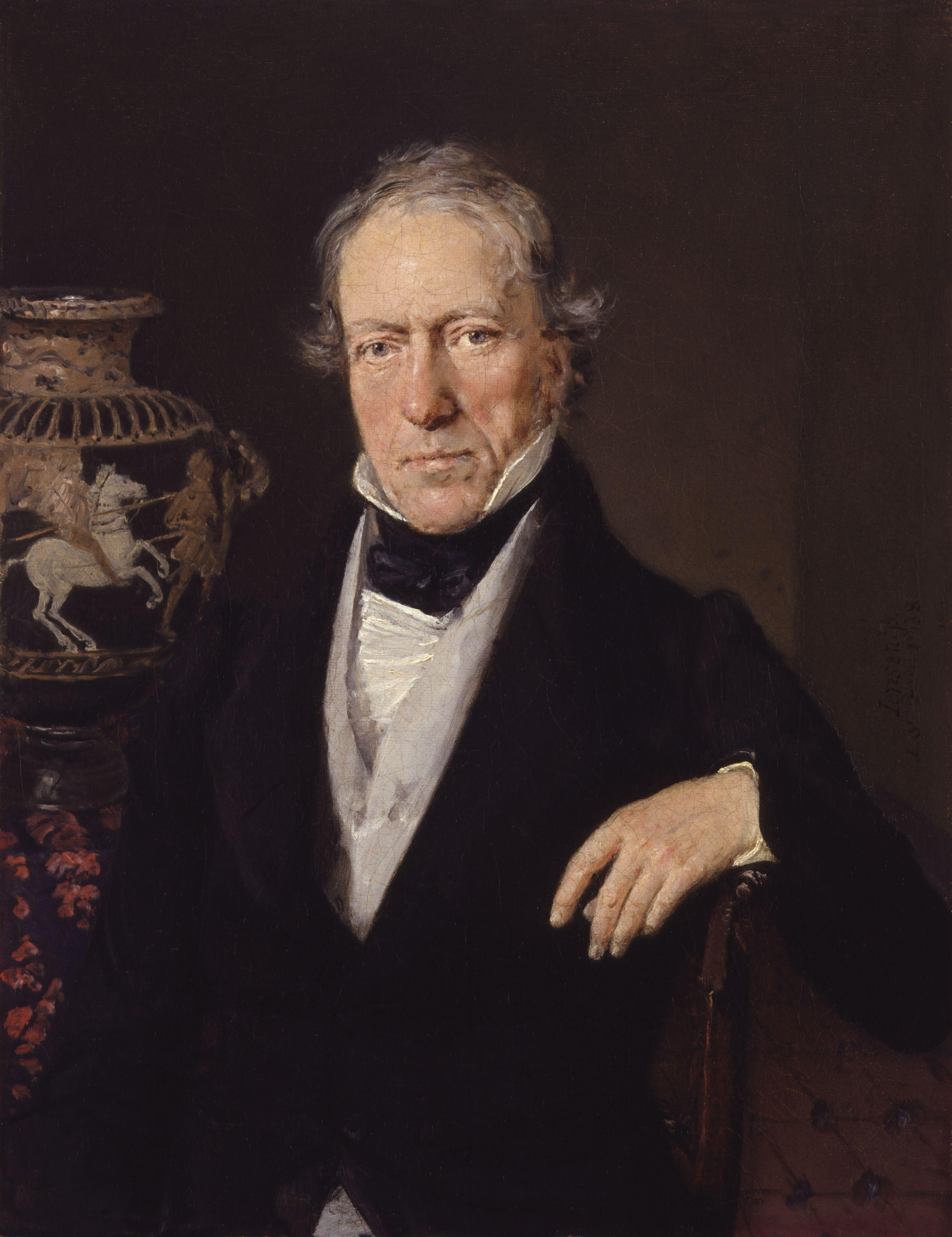
William Martin Leake, National Portrait Gallery, London, 1838

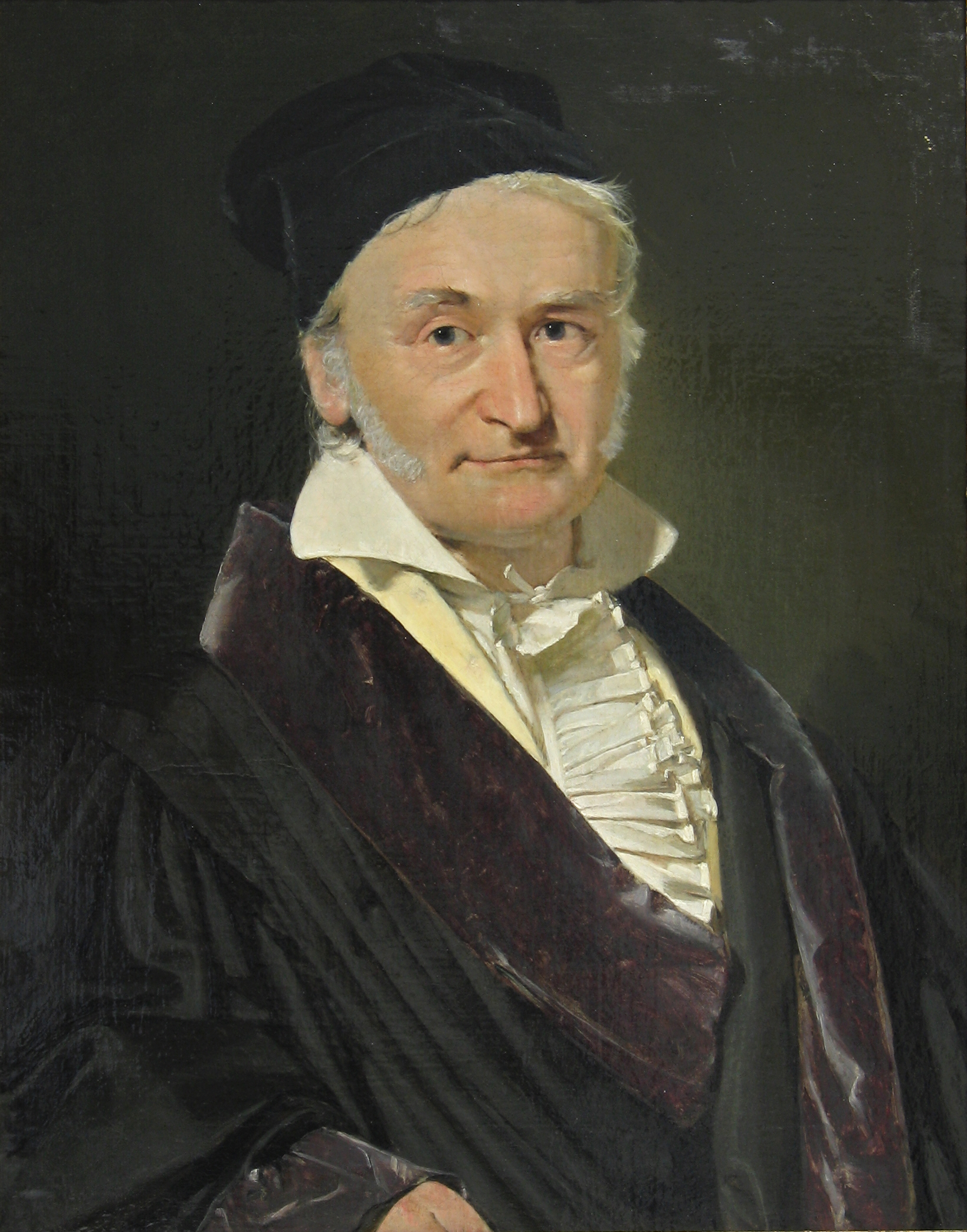
Carl Friedrich Gauss, 1840

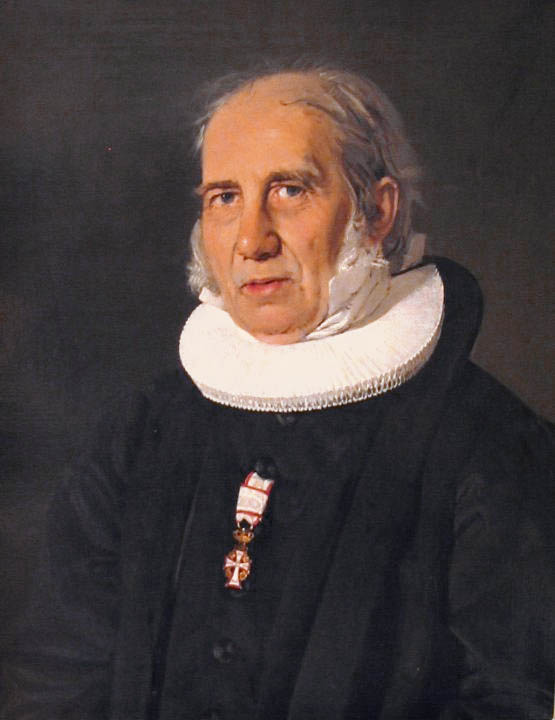
N. F. S. Grundtvig, 1843

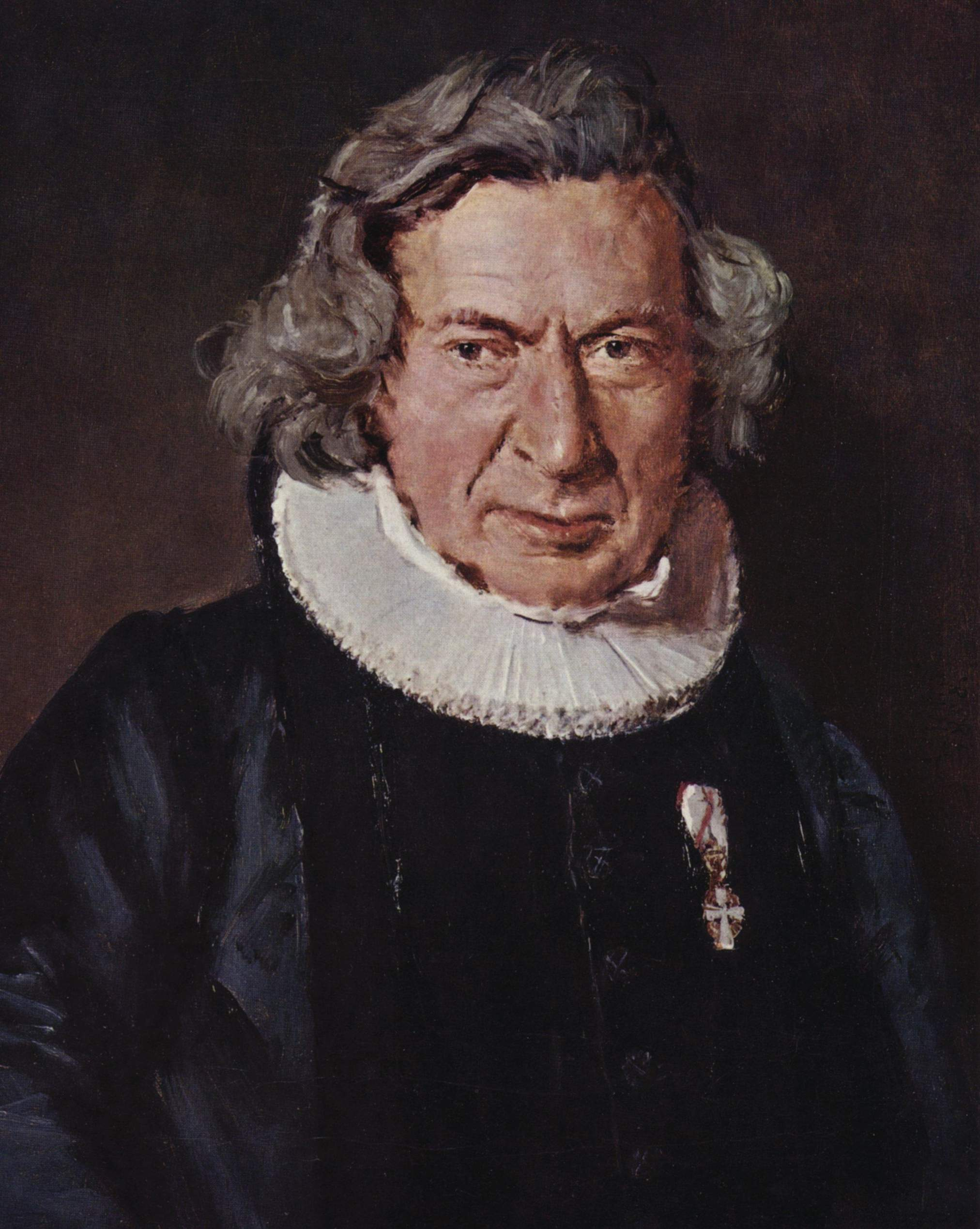
Andreas Gottlob Rudelbach, 1858

== See also ==
- Art of Denmark
- List of Danish painters

== Sources ==
- Cederstrøm, Elisabeth (2003). "Jensen, Christian Albrecht". Grove Art Online.
