= Rådhusstræde 5 =

Building in Copenhagen

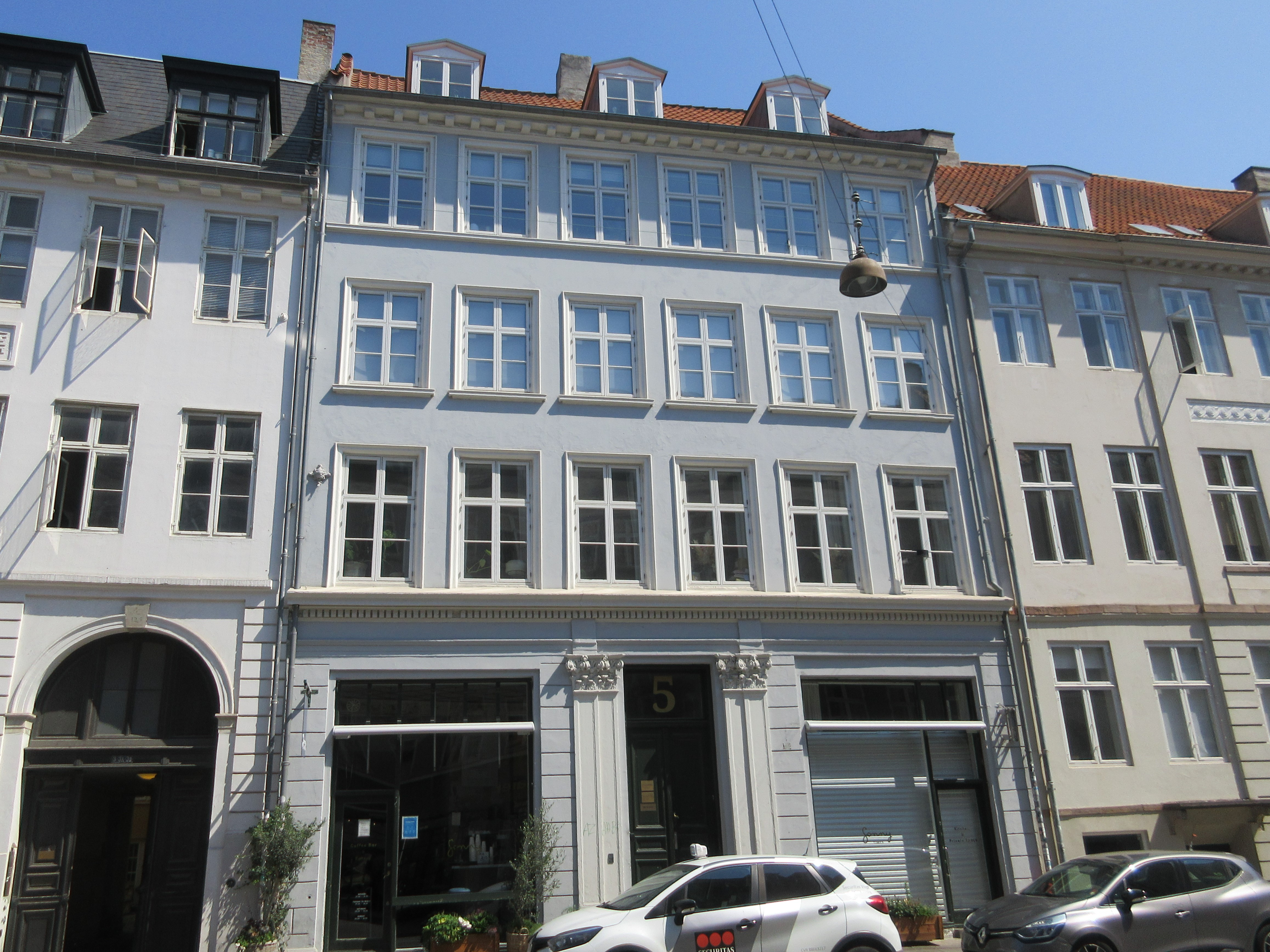
- Interactive map of the Rådhusstræde 5 area

General information
- Location: Copenhagen, Denmark
- Coordinates: 55°40′37.06″N 12°34′27.44″E
- Completed: 1796
- Renovated: 1739 (heightened), 1871–75

Rådhusstræde 5 is a neoclassical property situated close to Gammeltorv-Nytorv in the Old Town of Copenhagen, Denmark. Like most of the buildings in the area, the property was constructed as part of the rebuilding of the city following the Copenhagen Fire of 1795 but later expanded by one storey in 1830 and the facade was adapted in the first half of the 1870s. The building was listed in the Danish registry of protected buildings and places in 1945.

== History ==
=== 18th century ===
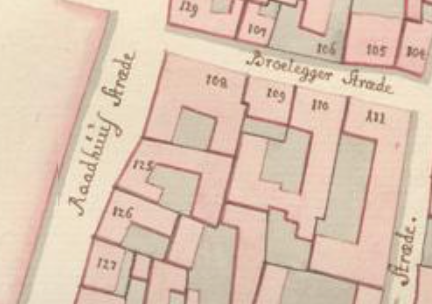
No. 126 seen on a detail from Christian Gedde's map of Snaren's Quarter, 1757.

The property was listed in 1689 as No. 143 in Snaren's Quarter, owned by Commissioner Junge. By 1756, it was listed as No. 126, owned by hatter Daniels Krøyer.

The property was owned by painter Andreas Petersen as of the 1787 census. He lived there with four employees (one of them his brother and two were apprentices) and a maid. The property was at this point also home to two more households. Boel Piil and Karen Piil, two sister bakers, resided in another apartment with two lodgers and a maid. The third household consisted of two female fruit vendors,. One of them was a widow and the other one was the other one was the wife of a musketeer, who is not mentioned as a resident, possibly because he was doing service elsewhere.

Together with most of the other buildings in the area, the property was destroyed in the Copenhagen Fire of 1795. The current building on the site was constructed in 1795–1796 for Andreas Petersen.

=== 19th century ===
The property was owned by the Jewish businessman (grosserer) Levin Isaac Cantor at the time of the 1801 census. He lived there with his wife Nanine née Wallich, their two-year-old son Carl August Cantor and a maid. Christopher Gleerup, a 30-year-old man whose profession is not mentioned in the census records, was also living there with them together with his two nieces (aged four and eleven) and one maid. Jes Pedersen, a workman (korndrager), resided in the basement with his wife Sidse Bendsdatter, their two children, two lodgers, a maid and the maid's one-year-old son.

Levin Isaac Cantor and Nanine Wallich were the parents of the physician and naturalist Theodore Cantor (1809–1860) but they had already sold the property in Rådhusstræde by the time he was born in 1809. The property was listed as No. 44 in the new cadastre of 1806. It was owned by captain S. Busch at the time.

Jurist Christian Paulsen (1798–1854) was among the residents of the building in 1824. Theologian Andreas Gottlob Rudelbach (1792–1862) resided in one of the apartments from 1827 to 1829. Actor Carl Winsløw (1796–1834) was among the residents in 1830. The building was expanded by one storey the same year.

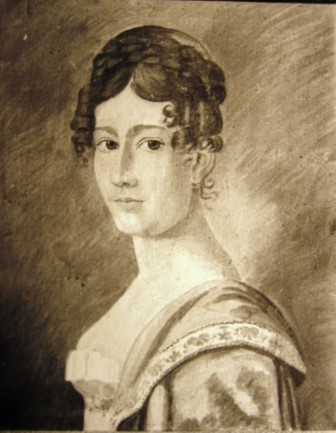
Christiane Mathilde Thorbjørnsen

At the time of the 1840 census, the property was home to a total of 26 people. Isaac Moses Lipmann Bernburg, a Jewish silk and textile merchant, resided on the first floor with his wife Hanna Bernburg, their three children (aged two to eleven), his sister Sara Bernburg, one male servant and two maids. Christiane Mathilde Thorbjørnsen (née Sternberg Selmer; daughter of former director of the Danish Asiatic Company Rasmus Sternberg Selmer), widow of lawyer (retsprokurator) Hans Carsten Thorbjørnsen, resided on the third floor with four children (aged 11 to 17), Ane Elisabeth von Ely and one maid. Simon Meisling, a titular professor of philology, remembered as Hans Christian Andersen's old headmaster first in Slagelse and then Helsingør, resided on the ground floor with his wife Cathrine Meisling, their three children (aged 15 to 22) and one maid. Meisling had taken over the apartment after leaving his position as headmaster of Helsingør Latin School and would shortly thereafter leave it again for an apartment at Rådhusstræde 2 on the other side of the street. Jens Momsen, the proprietor of the tavern in the basement, resided in the associated dwelling with his wife Stine Momsen, their five-year-old son Julius Stein Momsen and a maid.

Priest and playwright Jens Christian Hostrup (1818–1892) was among the residents in 1845.

At the time of the 1860 census, the property was home to a total of 23 people. Hanne Bernburg was now residing in the first floor apartment as a widow with her youngest son Julius Bernburg, one male servant and two maids. Julius Bernburg would later become a prominent businessman. Mathias Georg Peter Repholtz, a volunteer in the Ministry of Internal Affairs, resided on the second floor with his wife Sophie Louise Repholtz née Ramlau, one maid and the lodger Hans Haas. Simon Sander (died 1864), a Jewish businessman (grosserer), resided on the third floor with his wife Betty Sander, their three children (aged four to eight) and two maids. Eleman Petersen, a plumber (gassvend), resided on the ground floor with his wife Henriette née Wechby, their two-year-old daughter Thora Johanne Petersen and two maids. Hans Rasmussen, a grocer (høker), resided in the basement with his wife Sophie Rasmussen née Hansen.

=== 20th century ===
J. Lauritsen & Co., a coffee roastery and retailer founded on 1 November 1873 by Jeppe Lauritsen, opened a shop in the ground floor in 1875. The firm was also headquartered in the building. It was converted into a limited company (aktieselskab) in 1906. It was based in the building until at least the 1940s.

Jul. Vollmond, a trading firm founded on 19 November 1878 by Julius Vollmond (1853–1917), was also based in the building in 1950. It was owned at that time by Axel Steensen.

The property was home to just 13 people at the time of the 1906 census. It was owned by 41-year-old widow Hassing Elisabeth Juliette. She resided on the third floor with her daughter (aged 19) and two sons (aged 15 and 18). Emma Petrea Løffler, a 30-year-old widow, resided on the second floor with lodgers Edith Petrea Madsen (suerske) and Johan Holger Salomon (grosserer). Marie Elisabeth Helene Feldt, a 35-year-old widow, resided on the first floor with four lodgers and a maid.

== Architecture ==
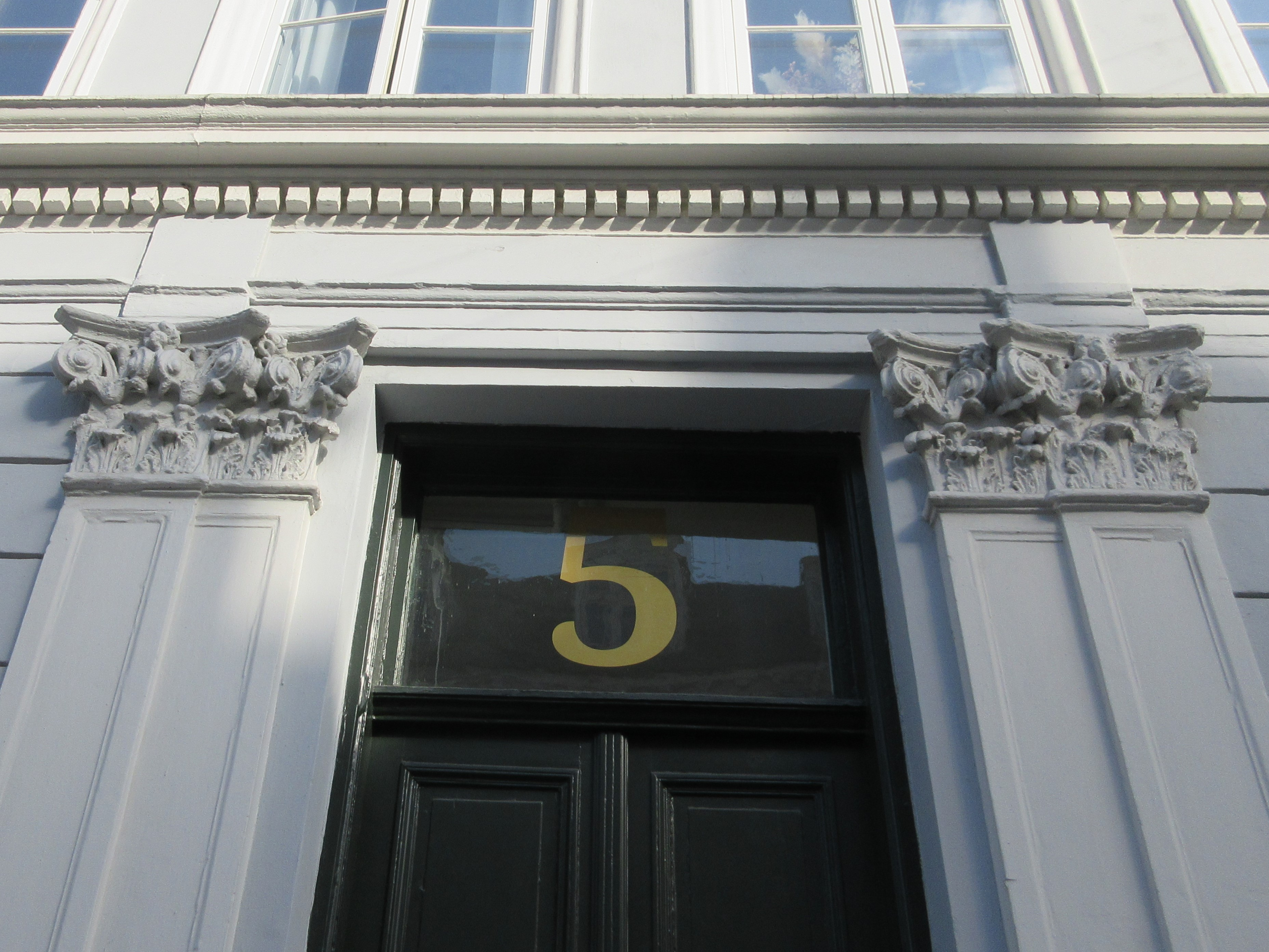
Facade detail

Rådhusstræde 5 is a three-winged complex, consisting of a six-bay-wide four-storey main wing towards the street, a perpendicular wing along one side of a small courtyard and a rear wing. The fourth flour was added in 1830 and the current facade design dates from a renovation in 1877. The ground floor is below a dentillated belt course finished with shadow joints and the main entrance is flanked by fluted pilasters with capitals. The upper floors are finished with sills below the windows on the second floor, a sill course below the windows on the third floor and a modillioned cornice. The pitched roof features three dormer windows towards the street and the roof ridge is pierced by two chimneys.

== Today ==
The property was owned by the property investment company Rikkesege Trading APS in 2008.
