= August Böckh =

German classical scholar and antiquarian (1785–1867)

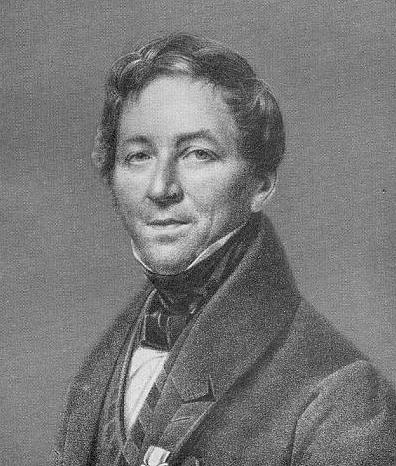
- Born: August Boeckh; 24 November 1785; Karlsruhe, Margraviate of Baden
- Died: 3 August 1867 (aged 81); Berlin, German Confederation
- Other name: Philipp August Böckh (misinterpreted)

Academic background
- Education: University of Halle
- Academic advisors: Johann August Ernesti; Friedrich Schleiermacher; Friedrich August Wolf

Academic work
- School or tradition: Hermeneutics; Methodological hermeneutics
- Institutions: Heidelberg University; University of Berlin
- Doctoral students: F. A. Trendelenburg
- Notable students: Wilhelm Dilthey; Johann Gustav Droysen; Karl Otfried Müller; Wilhelm Wackernagel
- Main interests: Philology
- Notable ideas: Philology as the entire knowledge of antiquity

August Böckh (born August Boeckh /bɜːrk/; German: [bœk]; 24 November 1785 – 3 August 1867) was a German classical scholar and antiquarian.

== Life ==
August Boeckh (later Böckh) was born in Karlsruhe, and educated at the local gymnasium; in 1803 he left for the University of Halle, where he studied theology. F. A. Wolf was teaching there, and creating an enthusiasm for classical studies; Böckh transferred from theology to philology, and became the best of Wolf's scholars.

In 1807, he established himself as Privatdozent in the University of Heidelberg and was shortly afterwards appointed professor extraordinarius, becoming professor two years later. The common misconception of Böckh's forenames being Philipp August originated in Heidelberg where staff of the university misread the abbreviation 'Dr phil' (doctor philosophiae) as 'Dr Philipp August Böckh'.

In 1811, he moved to the new University of Berlin, where he had been appointed professor of eloquence and classical literature. He remained there till his death. He was elected a member of the Academy of Sciences of Berlin in 1814, and for a long time acted as its secretary. Many of the speeches contained in his Gesammelte kleine Schriften were delivered in this latter capacity. He was elected a Foreign Honorary Member of the American Academy of Arts and Sciences in 1853.

Böckh died in Berlin in 1867, aged 81.

== Work ==
Böckh worked out the ideas of Wolf in regard to philology and illustrated them by his practice. Discarding the old idea that philology consisted in a minute acquaintance with words and the exercise of the critical art, he regarded it as the entire knowledge of antiquity (totius antiquitatis cognitio), historical and philosophical. He divides philology into five parts: first, an inquiry into public acts, with a knowledge of times and places, into civil institutions, and also into law; second, an inquiry into private affairs; third, an exhibition of the religions and arts of the ancient nations; fourth, a history of all their moral and physical speculations and beliefs, and of their literatures; and fifth, a complete explanation of the language.

Böckh set forth these ideas in a Latin oration delivered in 1822 (Gesammelte kleine Schriften, i.). In his speech at the opening of the congress of German philologists in 1850, he defined philology as the historical construction of the entire life – therefore, of all forms of culture and all the productions of a people in its practical and spiritual tendencies. He allows that such a work is too great for any one person; but the very infinity of subjects is the stimulus to the pursuit of truth, and scholars strive because they have not attained. An account of Böckh's division of philology will be found in Freund's Wie studiert man Philologie?

From 1806, till his death Böckh's literary activity was unceasing. His principal works include an edition of Pindar, the first volume of which (1811) contains the text of the Epinician odes; a treatise, De Metris Pindari, in three books; and Notae Criticae: the second (1819) contains the Scholia; and part ii. of volume ii. (1821) contains a Latin translation, a commentary, the fragments and indices. It was for a long time the most complete edition of Pindar. But it was especially the treatise on the metres which placed Böckh in the first rank of scholars. This treatise forms an epoch in the treatment of the subject. In it the author threw aside all attempts to determine the Greek metres by mere subjective standards, pointing out at the same time the close connection between the music and the poetry of the Greeks. He investigated minutely the nature of Greek music as far as it can be ascertained, as well as all the details regarding Greek musical instruments; and he explained the statements of the ancient Greek writers on rhythm. In this manner he laid the foundation for a scientific treatment of Greek metres.

His Die Staatshaushaltung der Athener (1817; 2nd ed. 1851, with a supplementary volume Urkunden über das Seewesen des attischen Staats; 3rd ed. 1886) was translated into English under the title of The Public Economy of Athens. In it he investigated a subject of peculiar difficulty with profound learning. He amassed information from the whole range of Greek literature, carefully appraised the value of the information given, and shows throughout every portion of it rare critical ability and insight. A work of a similar kind was his Metrologische Untersuchungen über Gewichte, Münzfüsse, und Masse des Alterthums (1838).

In regard to the taxes and revenue of the Athenian state he derived a great deal of his most trustworthy information from inscriptions, many of which are given in his book. When the Berlin Academy of Sciences projected the plan of a Corpus Inscriptionum Graecarum, Böckh was chosen as the principal editor. This work (1828–1877) is in four volumes, the third and fourth volumes being edited by J. Franz, E. Curtius, A. Kirchhoff and H. Röhl.

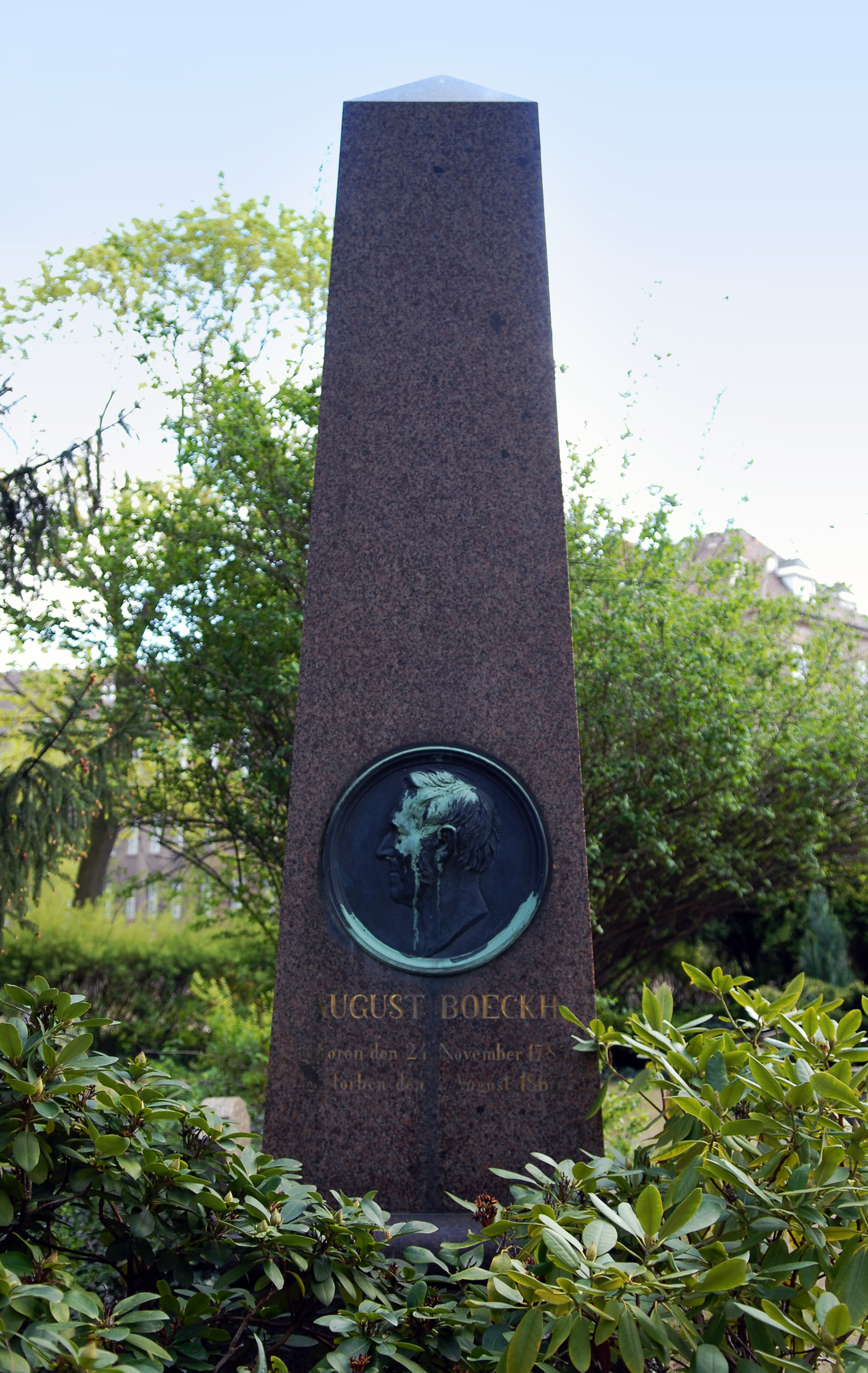
Grave marker of August Böckh, designed by Reinhold Begas

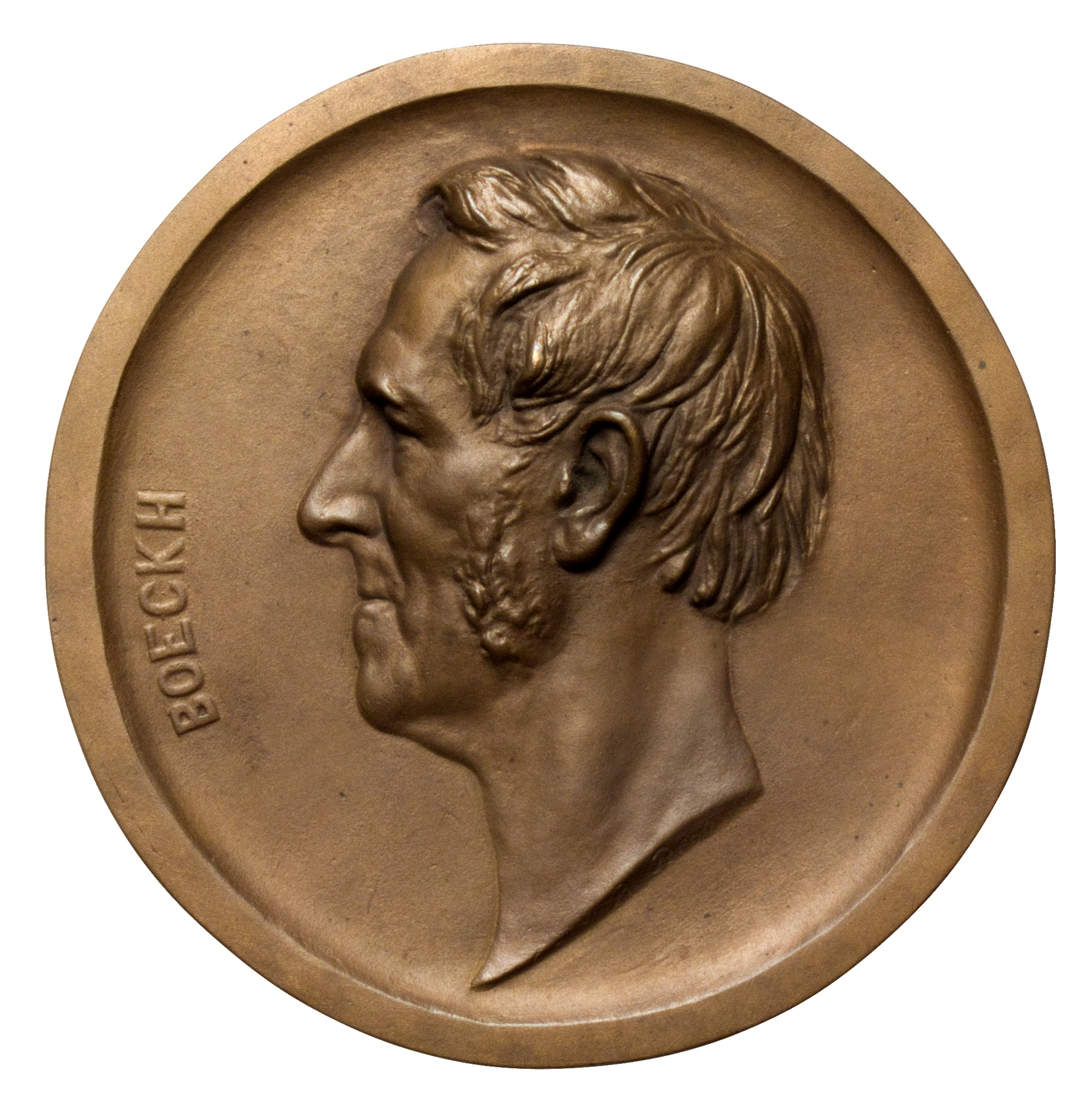
Begas' portrait medal of Böckh

Böckh's activity was continually digressing into widely different fields. He gained for himself a foremost position amongst the investigators of ancient chronology, and his name occupies a place by the side of those of Ideler and Mommsen. His principal works on this subject were: Zur Geschichte der Mondcyclen der Hellenen (1855); Epigraphisch-chronologische Studien (1856); Über die vierjährigen Sonnenkreise der Alten (1863), and several papers which he published in the Transactions of the Berlin Academy. Böckh also occupied himself with philosophy. One of his earliest papers was on the Platonic doctrine of the world, De Platonica corporis mundani fabrica et de vera Indole, Astronomiae Philolaice (1810), to which may be added Manetho und die Hundsternperiode (1845).

In opposition to Otto Gruppe, he denied that Plato affirmed the diurnal rotation of the earth (Untersuchungen über das kosmische System des Platon, 1852), and when in opposition to him Grote published his opinions on the subject (Plato and the Rotation of the Earth), Böckh was ready with his reply. Another of his earlier papers, and one frequently referred to, was Commentatio Academica de simultate quae Platoni cum Xenophonte intercessisse fertur (1811). Other philosophical writings were Commentatio in Platonis qui vulgo fertur Minoem (1806), and Philolaos des Pythagoreers Lehren nebst den Bruchstücken (1819), in which he endeavoured to show the genuineness of the fragments.

Besides his edition of Pindar, Böckh published an edition of the Antigone of Sophocles (1843) with a poetical translation and essays. An early and important work on the Greek tragedians is his Graecae Tragoediae Principum ... num ea quae supersunt et genuine omnia sint et forma primitive servata (1808).

The smaller writings of Böckh began to be collected in his lifetime. Three of the volumes were published before his death, and four after (Gesammelte kleine Schriften, 1858–1874). The first two consist of orations delivered in the university or academy of Berlin, or on public occasions. The third, fourth, fifth and sixth contain his contributions to the Transactions of the Berlin Academy, and the seventh contains his critiques. Böckh's lectures, delivered from 1809-1865, were published by Bratusehek under the title of Encyklopädie und Methodologie der philologischen Wissenschaften (1877; 2nd ed. Klussmann, 1886). His philological and scientific theories are set forth in Elze, Über Philologie als System (1845), and Reichhardt, Die Gliederung der Philologie entwickelt (1846). His correspondence with Karl Otfried Müller appeared at Leipzig in 1883.

John Paul Pritchard has made an abridged translation of Böckh's Encyclopädie und Methodologie der philologischen Wissenschaften: August Boeckh, On Interpretation and Criticism, University of Oklahoma Press, 1968.

== Works ==
- Philolaos des Pythagoreers Lehren nebst den Bruchstücken seines Werkes (1819)
- Manetho und die Hundssternperiode, Ein Beitrag zur Geschichte der Pharaonen "Manetho and the Dog Star Period, A Contribution to the History of the Pharaohs" (1845)

== See also ==
- Friedrich August Wolf
