= Emmanuel Steinschneider =

Russian scientist (1886–1970)

- Born: 21 December 1886; Narva, Saint Petersburg Governorate, Russian Empire (now Ida-Viru County, Estonia)
- Died: 2 December 1970 (aged 83); Moscow, Russian SFSR, Soviet Union
- Education: Halle University
- Known for: Malaria vaccine and typhus vaccine
- Scientific career
- Fields: Infectiology; Immunology; Virusology
- Workplaces: 1st MOLMI

Emmanuel Efimovich Steinschneider (Russian: Эммануил Ефимович Штайншнайдер; 21 December 1886 – 2 December 1970), was a Russian and Soviet physician and medical researcher, best known for his studies on influenza, malaria, typhoid, typhus, dysentery and other infections that were rampant during the first half of the 20th century.

== Biography ==
Emmanuel Steinschneider was born to a Jewish family in Narva, Russian Empire, his father was deeply respected in Jewish community for adopting and bringing up orphaned Jewish children. In 1905, he graduated with excellence from the high school. He then went to Germany, where he went up to the Halle University Faculty of Medicine. In 1912 after graduation he returned to Russia where he worked as a zemskiy doctor in the Dnipro District (Tauride) until the outbreak of World War I in 1914, when he was enlisted for active military service. During the war he served as a junior doctor of 142nd (1914), then the 129th Infantry Regiment (1915), and then as a junior ordinator of the 324th contagious field hospital (1916-1918).

After the Russian Revolution and during the Russian Civil War, in 1918-1921 served as the chief assistant of the epidotdel Military Medical Administration of the Moscow District, worked as a chief on the formation of the Red Guard sanitary units (1918). During these years, he was an assistant for infectious diseases clinic of the second Moscow State University.

- 1921-1923 - head of the Department of the Ural Medical Institute (Yekaterinburg).
- 1924-1940 - head of the Department for Infectious Diseases of the 2nd Moscow Medical Institute (1924-1930 associate professor, 1930-1940 professor).
- August 1940 – 1953 - head of the Department of Infectious Diseases 1st MOLMI.
- 1953–1973 - consultant for a number of medical institutions in Moscow.

Emmanuel E. Steinschneider was a member of the Board of I.I.Metchnikov clinical section of the Moscow branch of the Russian Society of microbiologists, epidemiologists and infectionists.

== Death ==
Steinschneider died 2 December 1970 in Moscow. He was buried at Vostryakovskoe Cemetery.

== Publications in German ==
- Beitrag zur Frage der Kaseebildung der Milzbrandbacillus und künstlichen Nähböden // Hygien. Runds. — 1913. — No. 7.
- Colitis pseudomembranacea Infantrum // Archiv Kinderheilk. — Bd. 62, H. 1, 2.
- Die Rezeptoren und ihre Zusammenhang mit der Anaphylaxie. — Leipzig: B. Konegen, 1913.
- Die Sessilen Rezeptoren bei Anaphylaxie // Reich. med. Angeiger. — 1913. — No. 5, 6, 7.
- Masern bei den Sengling // Archiv Kinderheilk. — Bd. 62.
- Schüttllversüche mit verschiedenen Bakterienarten // Bakteriol. Versehrif. Methad. — 1913. — No. 9.
- Ueber den Streptococcus Haemolyticus und seine ethiologische Bedeutung // Deutsch. med. Nachricht. — 1914. — No. 6.
- Ueber die Procasene Färbung // Hygien. Runds. — 1913. — No. 4.
- Ueber lipolitische Fermente bei den Infektionskrankheiten // Biochem. Beitrage. — 1926. — No. 16.
- Verschiedene Nähböden // Hygien. Runds. — 1913. — No. 1.
- Zur Kenntniss der anaphylaktischen Giftwirkung // Zentr.-Bl. allgem. Pathol. pathol. Anatomie. — 1912. — Bd. 23, No. 12.

== Publications in Russian ==
- Штайншнайдер Э. Е. Схема исследования больного. — М.: Полиграфкнига, 1947. — 7 с. — 2000 экз.
- Штайншнайдер Э. Е. Схема истории болезни Клиники инфекционных болезней 2 М.Г.У. — М.: Мосполиграф, 1928. — 10 с. — 2000 экз.
- Атипичные, лёгкие и стёртые формы брюшного тифа и их эпидемиологическое значение // Терап. Арх. — 1941. — Т. 19, в. 3.
- Аутоликвортерапия эпидемического церебро-спинального менингита // Тер. Арх.. — 1933. — Т. 11, в. 5.
- Брюшной тиф у вакцинированных // Сов. медицина. — 1941. — No. 7.
- Брюшной тиф у привитых : Дис. ... д-ра мед. наук. — 1939.
- Дезинфекция формалином холодным способом с учётом эффективности // Воен. журн. — 1914.
- Диэтотерапия при брюшном тифе // Сдана в «Клинич. медиц.» 1939 г.
- Изучение реконвалесцентного периода острых инфекционных заболеваний (брюшной тиф, паратиф и сыпной тиф) : Материалы клиники 2 МГУ, обнимающ. 1050 случаев. Коллективная работа // Сборник Цустрока НМТ. — 1929.
- К вопросу о гриппе на производстве и борьбе с ним // Сов. врачеб. газета. — 1934. — No. 6.
- Классификация гриппа // Сб. по гриппу. — 1936.
- Клинико-эпидемиологический анализ течения тифо-паратифозных заболеваний за 1943 г. (Коллективная работа по материалам Красно-Советской больницы и клиники инфекционных болезней 1-го МОЛМИ). — 1944.
- Клинико-эпидемиологический анализ тифозных заболеваний за 1928 г. (коллективная работа). — 1938.
- Лечение брюшного тифа // Сов. медицина. — 1942. — No. 7.
- Лечение гриппа хлором // Врачебная газета. — 1931. — No. 22.
- Наблюдения над туляремией (экспедиционный материал под руководством проф. Е. Н. Марциновского). Не подлежала оглашению.
- Новая элективная среда // Сов. врачеб. газета. — 1934. — No. 10.
- О висцеральных формах сибирской язвы (санитарно-эпидемиологическое исследование эпидемической вспышки сибирской язвы в .......м). — 1931. Секретная.
- О действующих началах рыбьего жира и его биологических свойствах // Тр. / Науч. ин-т В. С. К. — 1924.
- О деструктивном изменении сосудистой системы при сыпном тифе, как методе клинической диагностике // Тр. / Уральский гос. ун-т. — 1921.
- О клеточной природе анафилактического шока (экспериментальная работа). — 1936.
- О липолитических ферментах при инфекционных заболеваниях.
- О невыясненных формах тифа // Сов. клиника. — 1933. — Т. 19, No. 107—108.
- О санаториях нового типа для инвалидов войны // Моск. воен. журн. — 1923.
- Об агранулоцитарных ангинах (экспедиционный материал по изучению заболеваний «септической ангины» в С. и Н. областях). Материал 1932 и 1933 гг. Не подлежал оглашению.
- Об атипичных и стертых формах тифозных заболеваний : Рукопись. — 1935.
- Особенности течения сыпного тифа в военное время // Эвако-госпиталь17-42 / Сб. Баш. НКЗ. — 1943.
- Пищевые интоксикации кабачковой икрой в Дн......ке (ботулизм). — 1932. Секретная.
- Предохранительные прививки при тифо-паратифозной группе инфекций // Врачебное дело. — 1915.
- Профилактика гриппа антивирусом // Сов. врачеб. газета. — 1935. — No. 8.
- Процессы брожения и микробиологические свойства тузлуков (бактериологические и биологические свойства астраханских тузлуков) // Тр. / Науч. ин-т В. С. К. — 1924.
- Рецидивы и реинфекции // БМЭ. — 1934. — Т. 29.
- Рожа (монография). — 1938.
- Сибирская язва (монография). — 1939.
- Учебник по острым инфекционным заболеваниям. — 1939.
- Характерные особенности сыпного тифа, методов его лечения и профилактики // Сов. медицина. — 1943. — No. 6.
