= Heinrich Ernst Ferdinand Guericke =

German theologian

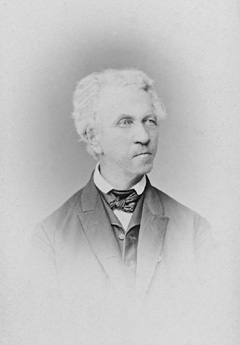
- Born: 25 February 1803; Wettin
- Died: 4 February 1878 (aged 74); Halle an der Saale

Academic work
- Discipline: theology
- Institutions: University of Halle
- Notable works: biography of August Hermann Francke

Heinrich Ernst Ferdinand Guericke (25 February 1803, Wettin – 4 February 1878, Halle an der Saale), was a German theologian.

He was born at Wettin in the Duchy of Magdeburg and studied theology at the University of Halle, where he was appointed associate professor in 1829. He disapproved of the union between the Lutheran and the Reformed churches, which had been accomplished by the Prussian government in 1817, and in 1833 he joined the Old Lutherans. In 1835 he lost his professorship, but he regained it in 1840.

== Published works ==
Among his works were a biography of August Hermann Francke, "August Hermann Francke. Eine Denkschrift zur Säcularfeier seines Todes" (1827) — later translated into English as: "The life of Augustus Herman Franké" (1837). He was also the author of:

- "Handbuch der Kirchengeschichte" (1833); translated into English by William G. T. Shedd (2 volumes):
  - "A manual of church history : ancient church history, comprising the first six centuries".
  - "A manual of church history : mediaeval church history, A.D. 590 - A.D. 1073".
- "Lehrbuch der christlich kirchlichen Archäologie" (1847); translated into English by A.J.W. Morrison as "Manual of the antiquities of the church" (1851).
- "Allgemeine christliche Symbolik : ein theologisches Handbuch" (3rd edition, 1861).

In 1840, with Andreas Gottlob Rudelbach, he founded the "Zeitschrift für die gesammte lutherische Theologie und Kirche".

== Translated works available online ==
- Manual of the Antiquities of the Church
- A Manual of Church History, Comprising the First Six Centuries
- A Manual of Church History: Mediaeval Church History, A.D. 590 - A.D. 1073
