= Ernst Kohlschütter =

German physician

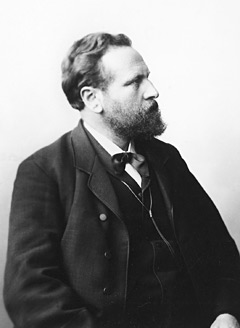
- Ernst Kohlschütter (1837–1905)
- Born: Ernst Otto Heinrich Kohlschütter; December 26, 1837; Dresden, Kingdom of Saxony
- Died: September 7, 1905 (aged 67); Bad Salzschlirf, Hesse, Germany
- Education: University of Halle
- Occupations: Physician, researcher, lecturer
- Relatives: Arnold Kohlschütter (son)
- Medical career
- Profession: Private physician, lecturer in balneology
- Institutions: University of Halle
- Notable works: Messungen der Festigkeit des Schlafes (Measurements of Sleep Quality; 1862)

Ernst Otto Heinrich Kohlschütter (26 December 1837 – 7 September 1905) was a German physician born in Dresden. He was the father of astronomer Arnold Kohlschütter (1883–1969).

The son of Dr. Otto Kohlschütter (1807–1853), he studied medicine at the University of Leipzig. In 1862 he earned his doctorate with an influential dissertation on "sleep depth" titled Messungen der Festigkeit des Schlafes. With help from Theodor Weber (1829–1914), he was able to remain in Leipzig as an assistant at the university polyclinic. Later on, he received his habilitation at the University of Halle, becoming a privat-docent of internal medicine and subsequently a lecturer in balneology.

He participated in the Franco-Prussian War, being awarded the Kriegsdenkmünze für die Feldzüge 1870–71 for his efforts. In 1875, he became an associate professor at the University of Halle. Although he never attained the title of "full professor" during his career, he remained at Halle as a lecturer, and in the meantime, worked at a private medical practice and was devoted to many social and political concerns. He was involved in the creation of Volksküchen (soup kitchens) and Volkskaffeehallen (people's coffee halls), and along with political economist Johannes Conrad, he opened a popular reading room in Halle. In 1880 he founded a holiday camp at Güntersberge in the Harz Mountains for needy, financially disadvantaged children. In 1892 he was appointed councillor (Gemeinderat) in Halle.

He died in 1905 at Bad Salzschlirf. The thoroughfare Kohlschütterstraße in Halle is named in his honor.

== Published works ==
- Messungen der Festigkeit des Schlafes, 1863.
- De corporis pondere per typhvm abdominalem mvtato meditationes : ad veniam docendi, 1866.
- Die Epidemieen der Stadt Halle an der Saale in den Jahren 1852-1871, (with Kurt Weineck, C. E. M. Pfeffer), 1872.
- Kohlschütter, Ernst Otto Heinrich (1889). "Lecture by Professor Kohlschütter on Dr. Louis Weigert's method of treating consumption; translation from the stenographic report for the Vienna "Internationale Klinische Rundschau."". Wellcome Collection. Halle : Physicians' Society. OCLC 54986709.
