= Karl Elze =

German scholar and critic (1821–1889)

Karl Friedrich Elze
- Born: 22 May 1821; Dessau
- Died: 21 January 1889 (aged 67); Halle
- Education: Leipzig University PhD.
- Occupation: Shakespeare scholar
- Parent: Karl August Wilhelm Elze

Karl Friedrich Elze (22 May 1821, Dessau – 21 January 1889, Halle) was a German scholar and Shakespearean critic.

== Life ==
He was the son of Pastor Karl August Wilhelm Elze. He studied (1839–1843) classical philology, and modern, but especially English, literature at the University of Leipzig where he obtained his PhD. He was a master for a time in the gymnasium (preparatory school) at Dessau, and in 1875 was appointed extraordinary, and in 1876 ordinary, professor of English philology at the University of Halle. The course catalogue for the winter 1875/76 has a four-hour lecture on the history of English literature one hour each day on Mondays, Tuesdays, Thursdays and Fridays. On Wednesdays and Saturdays he publicly lectured on Shakespeare's The Merchant of Venice.

Elze began his literary career with the Englischer Liederschatz (1851), an anthology of English lyrics, edited for a while a critical periodical Atlantis, and in 1857 published an edition of Shakespeare's Hamlet with critical notes. He also edited George Chapman's Alphonsus (1867) and wrote biographies of Walter Scott, Byron and Shakespeare; Abhandlungen zu Shakespeare (English translation by D Schmitz, as Essays on Shakespeare, London, 1874), and the treatise, Notes on Elizabethan Dramatists with conjectural emendations of the text (3 volumes, Halle, 1880–1886, new ed. 1889).

He was politically active as a member of the Dessau-ischen for many years and presented a programmatic script to the Constitution of the Duchy of 1848 and promoted the idea that "Freedom of religion should be granted without Government controls".
