= Max Planck Research Unit for Enzymology of Protein Folding =

German research institute

Coordinates: 51°29′51″N 11°56′27″E

The Max Planck Research Unit for Enzymology of Protein Folding was located in Halle (Saale), Germany. It was founded in 1996 and closed 31 December 2012. It was one of 80 institute in the Max Planck Society (Max Planck Gesellschaft).
