= Andreas Gottlob Rudelbach =

Danish-German Lutheran author and theologian (1792–1862)

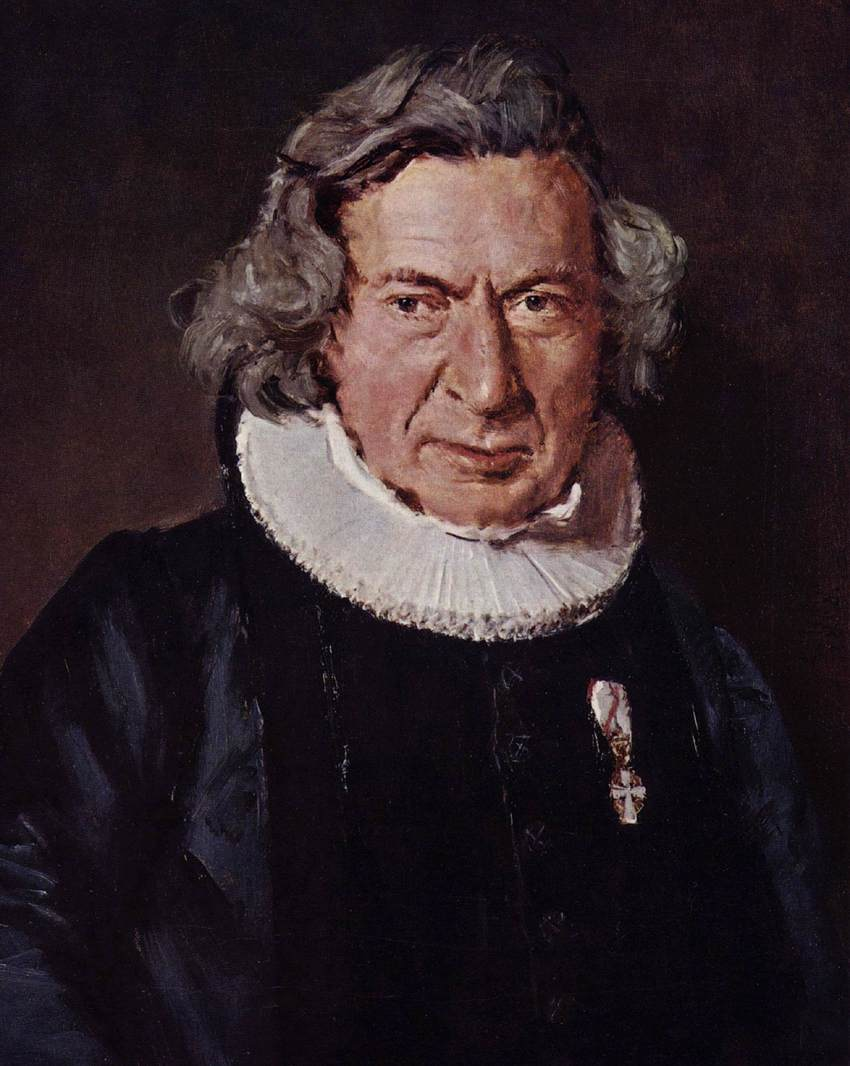
- Born: 29 September 1792; Copenhagen, Denmark
- Died: 3 March 1862 (aged 69); Slagelse, Denmark

Andreas Gottlob Rudelbach (29 September 1792 – 3 March 1862) was a Danish-German neo-Lutheran author and theologian. He was superintendent in Glauchau from 1829–1845 and parish priest of Slagelse from 1848–1862.

Despite being acknowledged as one of the most highly educated members of the Danish Lutheran clergy, Rudelbach's theological views were often in opposition to the religious establishment and led him to be rejected by many of his peers in Denmark and Saxony. Alongside N. F. S. Grundtvig, Rudelbach was a staunch dissident of rationalism. However, he too came into conflict with Grundtvig towards the later part of his career.

== Early life and education ==
Andreas Gottlob Rudelbach was born on 29 September 1792 in Copenhagen, Denmark–Norway. His mother, Berthe Cathrine Ørstrøm (1753–1825), was from Sweden and his father, Johann Heinrich Gottlob Rudelbach (1748–1821), was a tailor from Saxony. As a child, his family was part of the German-speaking community of St. Peter's Church.

He was educated the Metropolitanskolen from 1810 and attended the University of Copenhagen, where he received the academic title of privatdozent. He received a candidate degree in Christian theology in 1820 and was made a Doctor of Philosophy in 1822, following a successful thesis on Greek and Christian ethics. The same year he was awarded his doctorate, he married Elisabeth Marie Bønsøe (1803–1867) in Frederiksberg on 28 June 1822.

== Career ==
Despite his qualifications, Rudelbach's theological positions prevented him from being offered a teaching position at the University of Copenhagen. From 1823 to 1824 he traveled through Austria, France, Germany, and Switzerland. He came into contact with leading Protestant scholars and theologians of his time, including Johann Blumhardt, Henri Grégoire, Georg Wilhelm Friedrich Hegel, Johann Michael Sailer, and Friedrich Schleiermacher. On his return to Denmark, he published the Augsburg Confession in Danish in 1825 and authored a disputation, De typis ac symbolis Scripturae sacrae dissertatio. His theological disputation was accepted by Kiel University, but Rudelbach was not awarded a degree in response.

Through a connection to the highly conservative professor Ernst Wilhelm Hengstenberg, Rudelbach was recommended to count Ludwig von Schönburg of Saxony. Through Schönburg he was made superintendent of Glauchau in 1829. There, he encouraged religious awakening and a rejection of rationalism while opposing any formal separation from the Lutheran Church. While in Saxony, he published work on Danish church affairs and in 1837 published a translation of Grundtvig's The First World Chronicle in German. He gradually found himself in conflict with other clergy in Saxony, particularly because of his strict adherence to Lutheran dogma. He resigned as superintendent of Glauchau in 1845 and returned to Denmark.

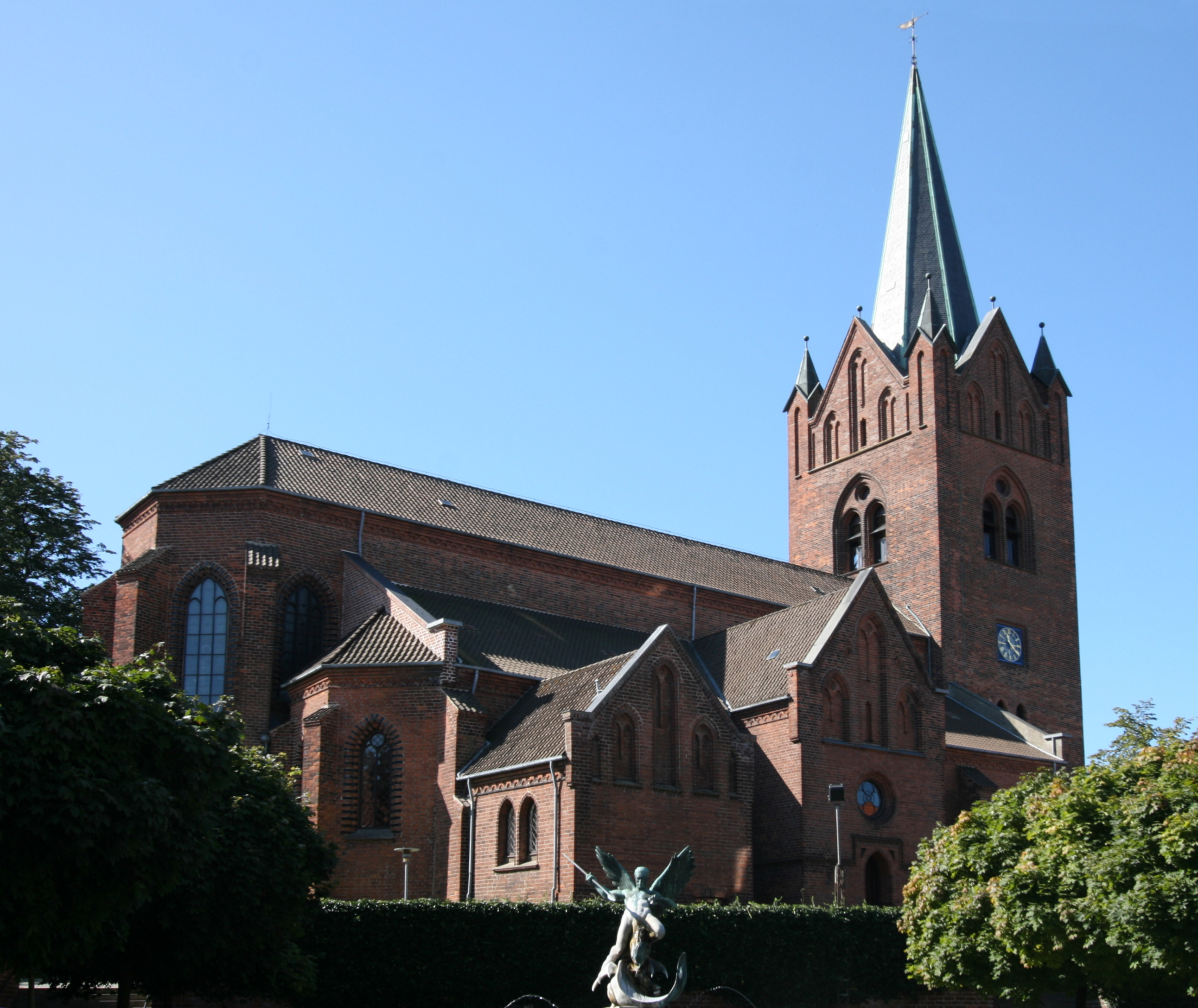
Saint Mikkel's Church in Slagelse, where Rudelbach was parish priest from 1848 to 1862

While at the University, he collaborated with N. F. S. Grundtvig in editing the Theologisk Maanedskrift, which was published in 13 volumes. For a time, he and Grudtvig shared ecclesiastical views when it came to the rationalism, however, Rudelbach began to distance himself from Grundtvig after his return to Denmark in 1845. He spoke in opposition, in particular, against Grundtvig's growing influence over the Church of Denmark and Danish national identity.

From 1846 to 1848 he lectured at the University of Copenhagen on Dogmatic theology. Although his theological stances had prevented him from gaining a position at the University in the 1820s, he now enjoyed some level of protection from his patron, King Christian VIII. After the King's death in 1848, however, criticisms of Rudelbach were renewed. This opposition prevented him from being formally accepted as a lecturer at the University. He left Copenhagen that year, accepting a position as the parish priest in Slagelse at Saint Mikkels Church. He died in Slagelse on 3 March 1862.

== Works ==
Rudelbach edited the Zeitschrift für die gesammte lutherische Theologie und Kirche (1839) in collaboration with H. E. F. Guericke and Christliche Biographie (1849). He also published several works and volumes of sermons, including:

- Hieronymus Savonarola und seine Zeit (Hamburg, 1835)
- Reformation, Luthertum und Union (Leipzig, 1839)
- Historische-kritische Einleitung in die Augsburgische Konfession (Dresden, 1841)
- Amtliches Gutachten über die Wiedereinführung der Katechismus-Examina im Königreich Sachsen, nebst historischer Erörterung der Kathechismus-Anstalten in der evangelisch-lutherischen Kirche Deutschlands (1841)
- Om Psalme-Literaturen og Psalmebogs-Sagen, historisk-kritiske Undersögelser (Copenhagen, 1856)
