= Martin Luther University Halle-Wittenberg =

Public university in Germany

- Martin-Luther-Universität Halle-Wittenberg
- Motto: Zukunft mit Tradition
- Motto in English: Future with Tradition
- Type: Public
- Established: 18 October 1502; 523 years ago
- Affiliations: Global Compact
- Budget: €182.9 million
- Rector: Claudia Becker
- Academic staff: 663
- Administrative staff: 710
- Students: 19,319
- Location: Halle, Saxony-Anhalt, Germany; 51°29′11″N 11°58′08″E
- Campus: Urban
- Colors: Emerald green
- Mascot: Lions
- Website: uni-halle.de

Martin Luther University Halle-Wittenberg (German: Martin-Luther-Universität Halle-Wittenberg), also referred to as MLU, is a public research university in the cities of Halle and Wittenberg. It is the largest and oldest university in the German state of Saxony-Anhalt. MLU offers German and international (English) courses leading to academic degrees such as BA, BSc, MA, MSc, doctoral degrees, and habilitation.

The university was created in 1817 through the merger of the University of Wittenberg (founded in 1502) and the University of Halle (founded in 1694). MLU is named after Protestant reformer Martin Luther, who was a professor in Wittenberg. Today, the university campus is located in Halle, while Leucorea Foundation in Wittenberg serves as MLU's convention centre.

== History ==
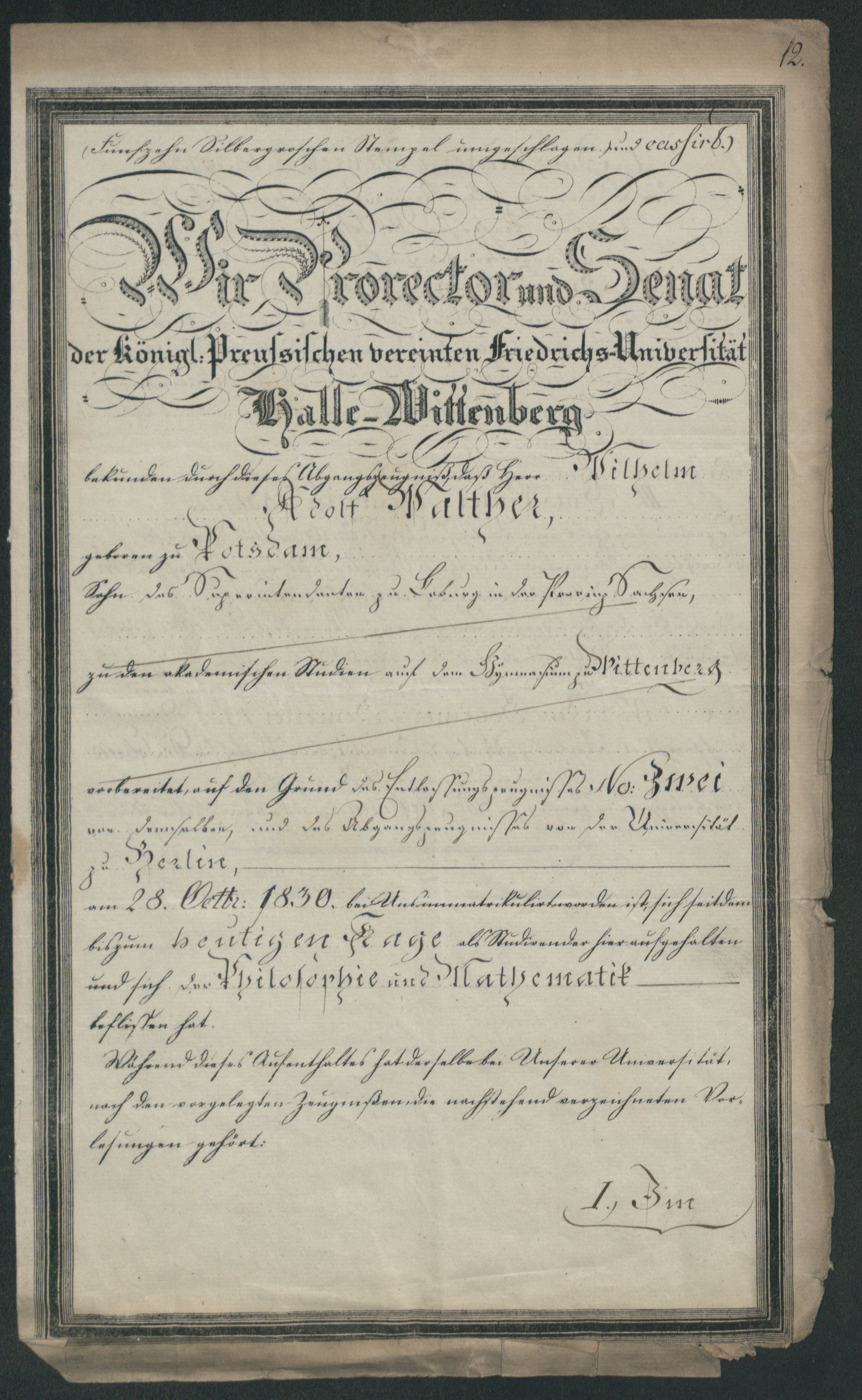
Diploma 1833 (Source: State Archive in Poznań (Posen))

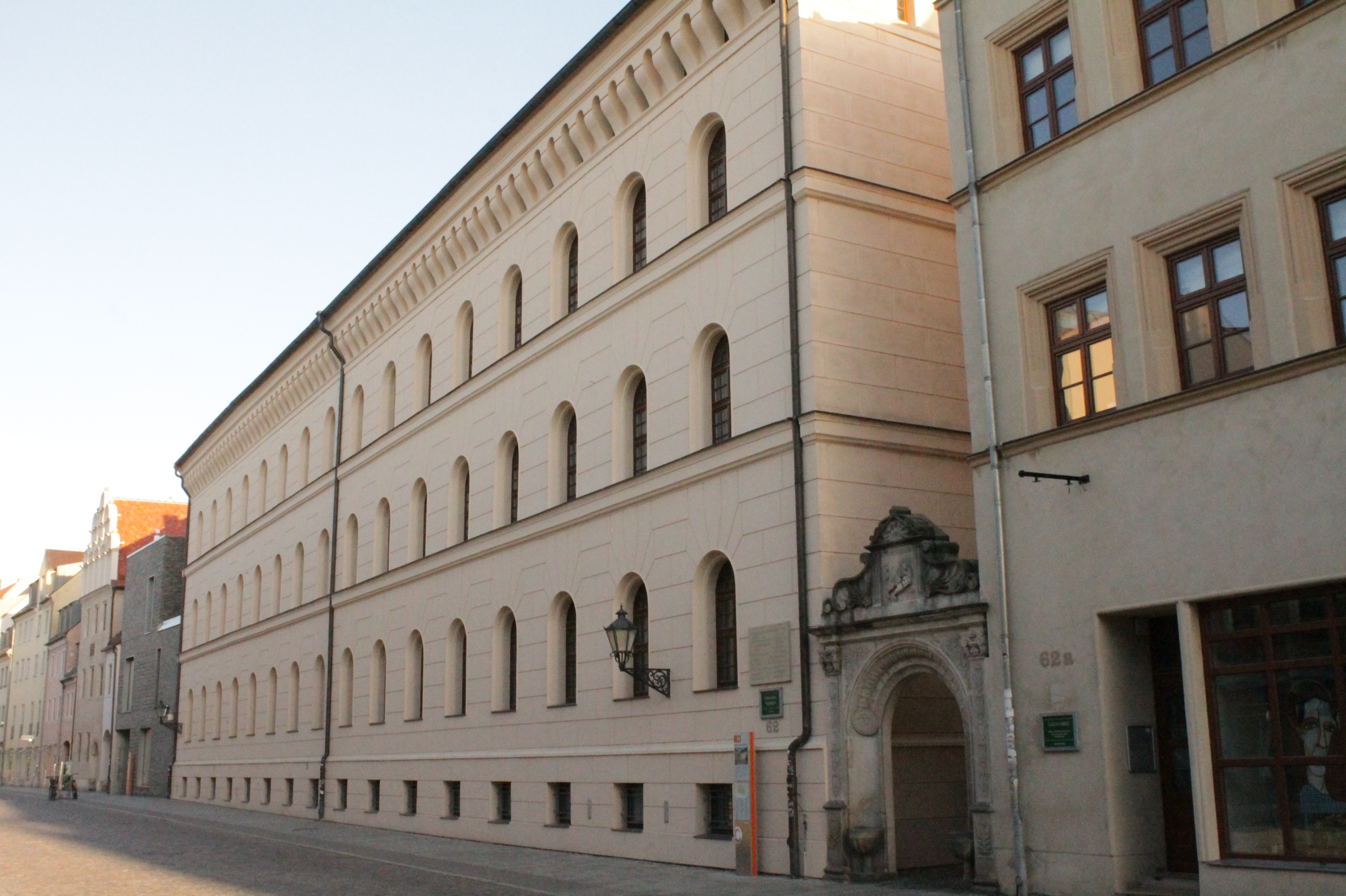
Wittenberg University, Collegianstrasse, Wittenberg

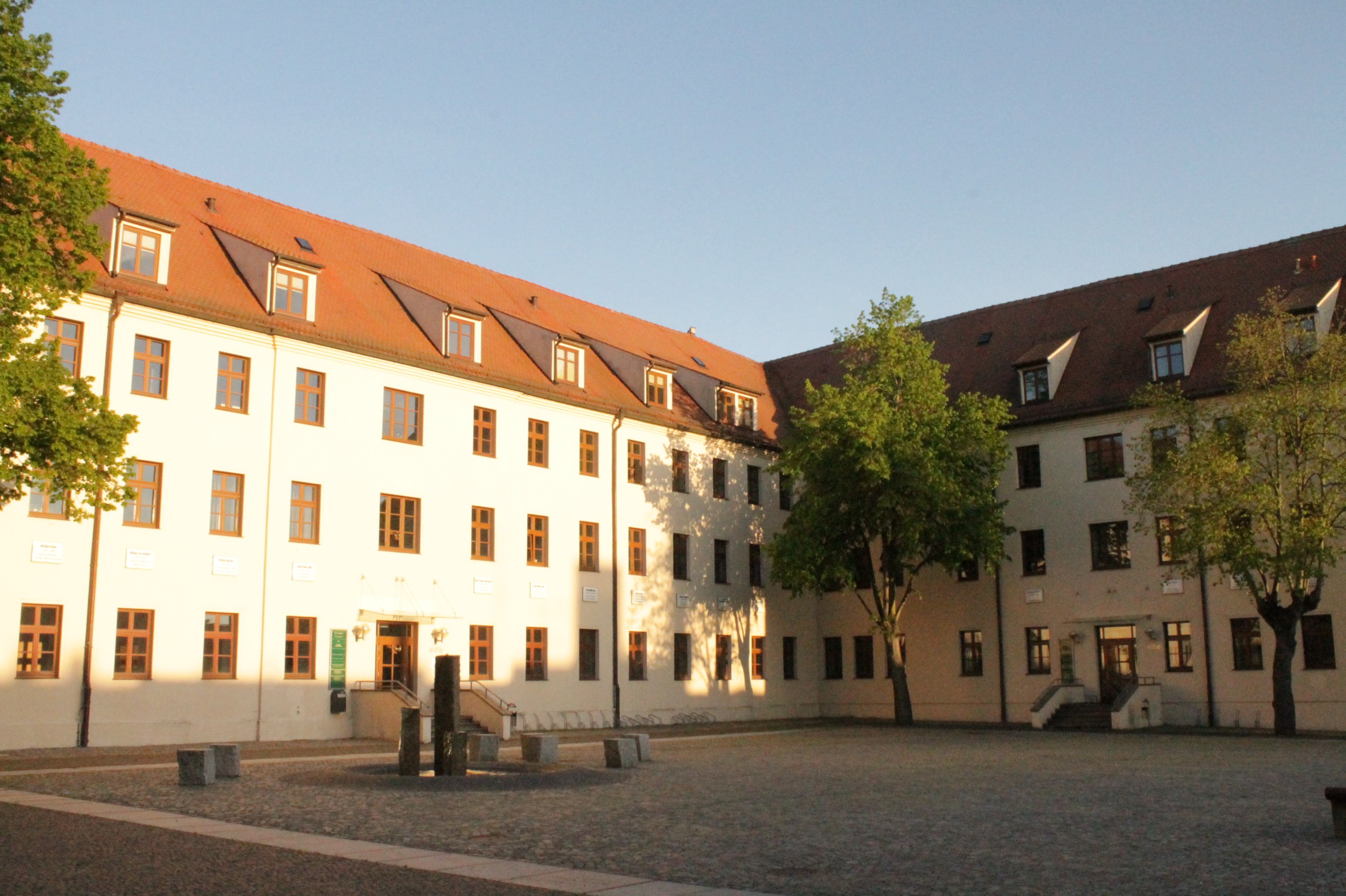
Quadrangle, Wittenberg University

University of Wittenberg (Universität Wittenberg) was founded in 1502 by Frederick the Wise, Elector of Saxony to propagate the principles of Renaissance humanism. The foundation of the university was heavily criticized, especially when Martin Luther's Ninety-five Theses reached Albert of Brandenburg, the Archbishop of Mainz. Ecclesiastically speaking, the Electorate of Saxony was subordinate to Albert. He criticized the elector for Luther's theses, viewing the recently founded university as a breeding ground for heretical ideas. Under the influence of Philipp Melanchthon, building on the works of Martin Luther, the university became a centre of Protestant Reformation, even incorporating, at one point in time, Luther's house in Wittenberg, the Lutherhaus, as part of the campus. Notable alumni include George Müller, Georg Joachim Rheticus and – in fiction – William Shakespeare's Prince Hamlet and Horatio and Christopher Marlowe's Doctor Faustus.

University of Halle (Universität Halle) was founded in 1694 by Frederick III, Elector of Brandenburg, who became Frederick I, King in Prussia, in 1701. In the late 17th century and early 18th century, Halle became a centre for Pietism within Prussia.

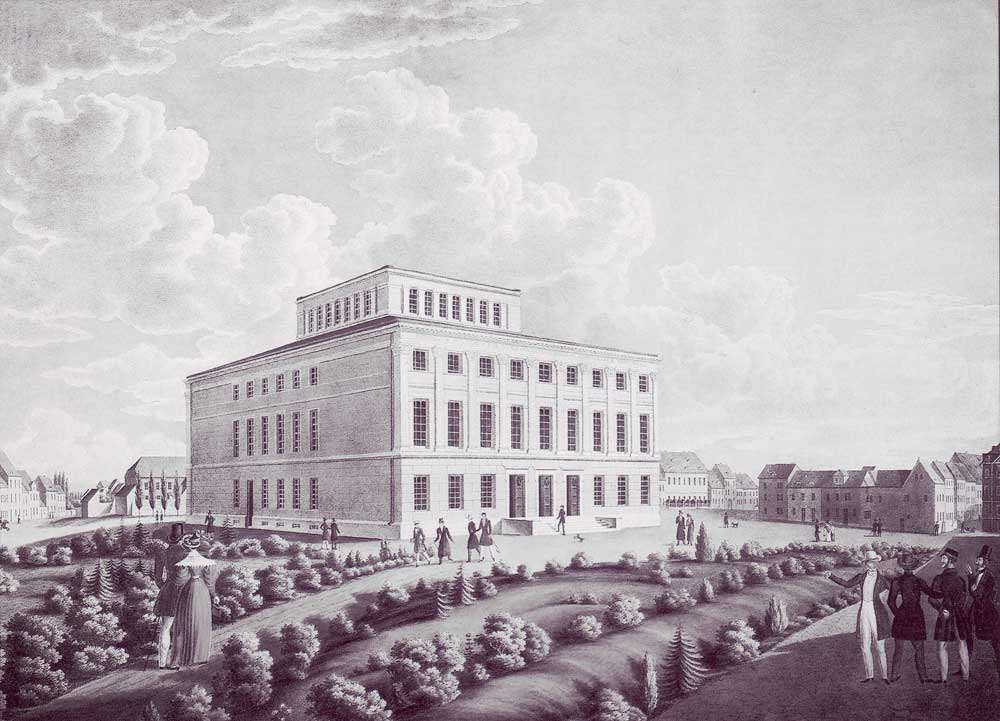
The University of Halle in 1836.

In the 17th and 18th centuries, the universities were centers of the German Enlightenment. Christian Wolff was an important proponent of rationalism. He influenced many German scholars, such as Immanuel Kant. Christian Thomasius was at the same time the first philosopher in Germany to hold his lectures not in Latin, but German. He contributed to a rational programme in philosophy but also tried to establish a more common-sense point of view, which was aimed against the unquestioned superiority of aristocracy and theology.

The institutionalisation of the local language (German) as the language of instruction, the prioritisation of rationalism over religious orthodoxy, new modes of teaching, and the ceding of control over their work to the professors themselves, were among various innovations which characterised the University of Halle, and have led to its being referred to as the first "modern" university, whose liberalism was adopted by the University of Göttingen about a generation later, and subsequently by other German and then most North American universities.

The University of Wittenberg was closed in 1813 during the Napoleonic Wars. The town of Wittenberg was granted to Prussia in the Congress of Vienna in 1815, and the university was then merged with the Prussian University of Halle in 1817. It took its present name on 10 November 1933.

=== Nazi period ===
Under the Nazi regime, more than a dozen professors were expelled. Others were shifted to Halle-Wittenberg from universities regarded as "better" at the time, which led to the university being called an academic Vorkuta (after the largest center of the Gulag camps in European Russia).

== Faculties ==
Following the continental European academic tradition, MLU has 9 faculties, regrouping academic staff and students according to their field of studies (as opposed to the Anglo-Saxon collegiate university model):

- Faculty of Theology
- Faculty of Law and Economics
- Faculty of Medicine
- Faculty of Philosophy I (Social and Cultural Studies, History, Archaeology and Art History)
- Faculty of Philosophy II (Ancient and Modern Languages, Communication Studies, Music)
- Faculty of Philosophy III (Paedagogy)
- Faculty of Natural Sciences I (Biochemistry, Biology, Pharmacy)
- Faculty of Natural Sciences II (Physics, Chemistry, Mathematics)
- Faculty of Natural Sciences III (Agriculture, Geology, Computer Science)

== Points of interest ==
- MLU's botanical garden, founded in 1698.
- MLU's historical observatory, built in 1788 by Carl Gotthard Langhans.

== Cooperating research institutions ==
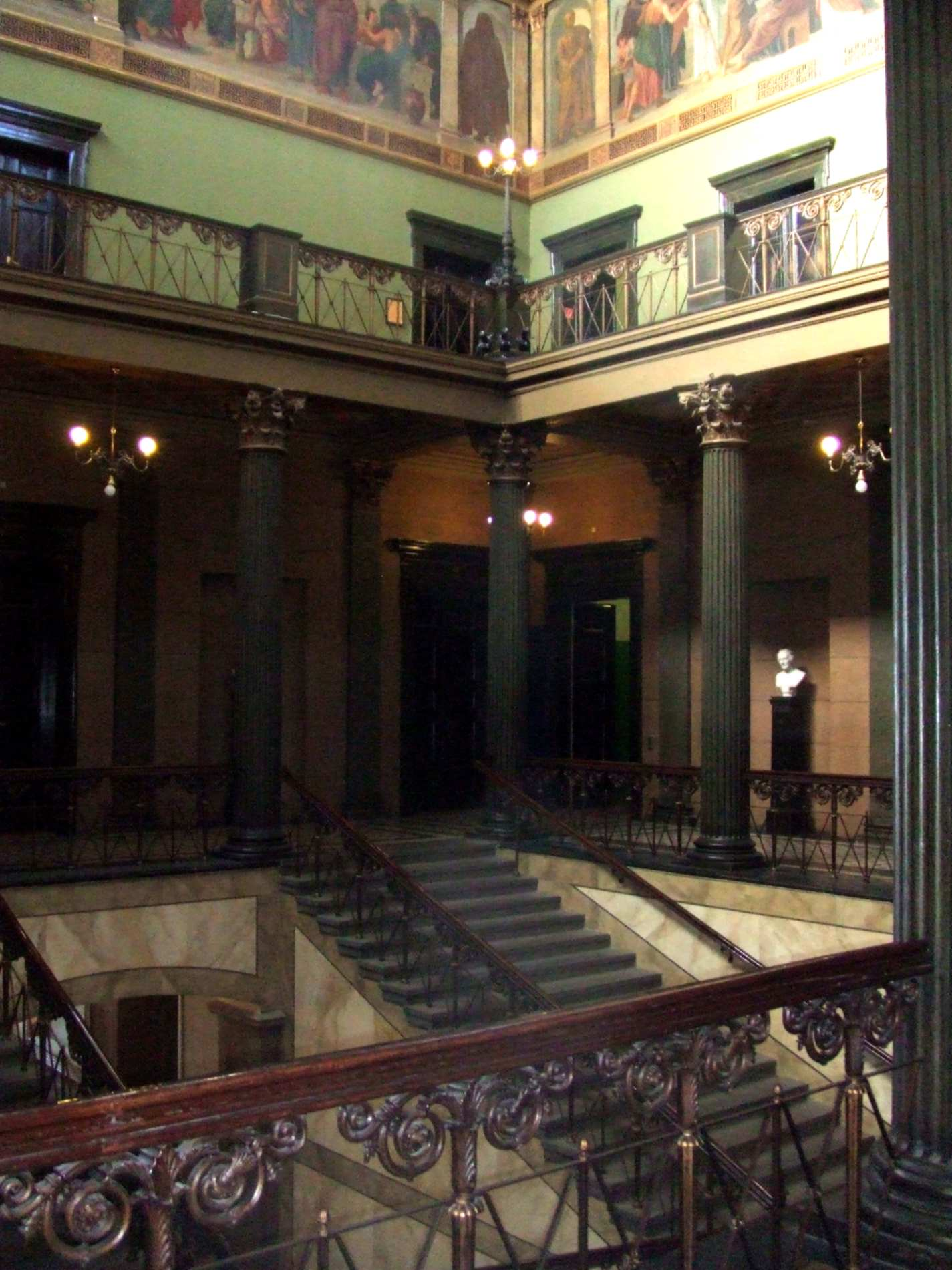
MLU's Lions' Hall ("Löwengebäude"), decorated with neoclassical frescos.

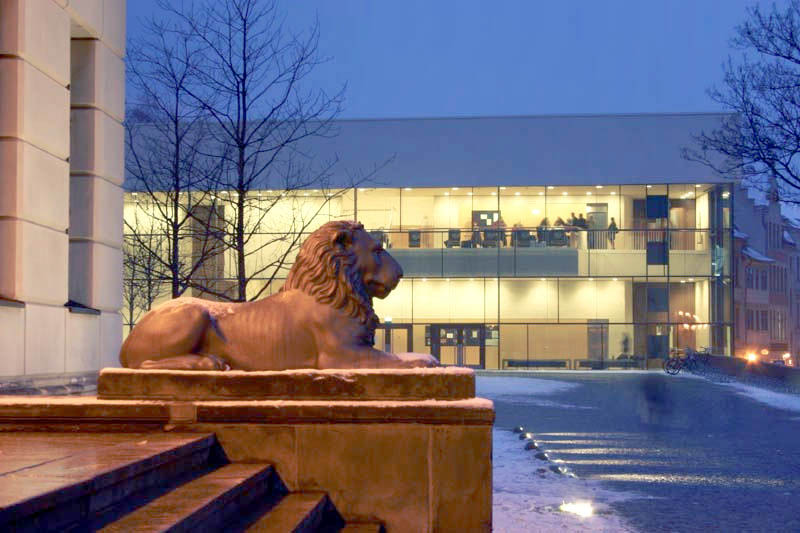
Central lecture hall ("Auditorium Maximum", in the background) and entry of Lions' Hall (in the front).

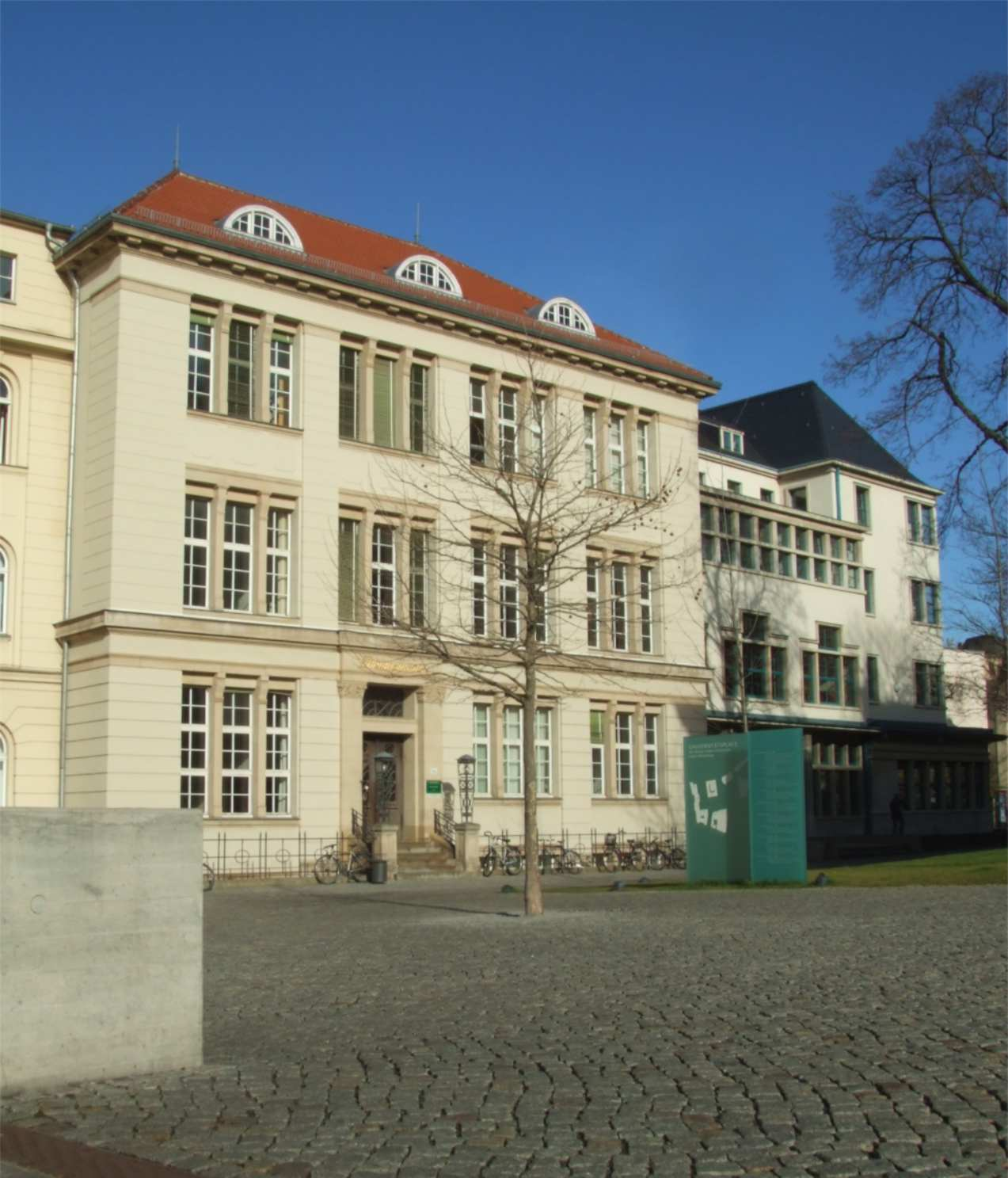
Thomasianum (office of MLU's president and chancellor).

MLU is enclosed by a variety of research institutions, which have either institutional or personal links with the university or cooperate occasionally in their respective fields of studies:

- The German Academy of Sciences Leopoldina
- The Halle Institute for Economic Research
- The Fraunhofer Institute for Mechanics of Materials
- The Leibniz Institute of Agricultural Development in Central and Eastern Europe
- The Leibniz Institute of Plant Biochemistry
- The Max Planck Research Unit for Enzymology of Protein Folding
- The Max Planck Institute for Social Anthropology
- The Max Planck Institute of Microstructure Physics
- The Helmholtz Centre for Environmental Research

== Collegium musicum ==
Even though MLU is an academic, research oriented institution, not an academy of music or conservatory, the university has an academic orchestra, founded in 1779, and a rather prestigious choir, founded in 1950, which together constitute the so-called Collegium musicum. Members are mostly gifted students of all faculties, but also academic staff and alumni. The university choir regularly performs at the international Handel Festival in George Frideric Handel's birthplace, Halle.

== Partner universities ==
MLU's international partner universities include:

- Argentina: National University of La Plata
- Armenia: Yerevan State University
- Australia: University of Queensland
- Austria: Johannes Kepler University Linz
- Canada: University of Ottawa
- Colombia: National University of Colombia and University of Atlántico
- China: Beijing University of Chemical Technology
- Czech Republic: The Department of Musicology at the Palacky University Olomouc of Palacký University Faculty of Philosophy
- France: Charles de Gaulle University – Lille III, Paris X University Nanterre
- Hungary: University of Szeged
- India: Jawaharlal Nehru University, New Delhi
- Israel: Tel Aviv University, Ben-Gurion University of the Negev, Bar-Ilan University
- Italy: University of Palermo, University of Pisa, University of Naples Federico II
- Japan: Senshu University, Sophia University, Waseda University, Keio University
- Mauritius: University of Mauritius
- Mongolia: National University of Mongolia
- Peru: National University of San Marcos
- Poland: University of Gdańsk, Silesian University of Technology, Jan Kochanowski University, Adam Mickiewicz University in Poznań, Poznan University of Medical Sciences
- Romania: Babeș-Bolyai University
- Russia: M. V. Lomonosov Moscow State University, Moscow City Pedagogical University, Smolensk Humanitarian University, Bashkir State University, Voronezh State University, Joint Institute for Nuclear Research Dubna
- Slovakia: Comenius University in Bratislava, Slovak University of Technology in Bratislava
- Spain: University of Alcalá
- South Africa: University of Pretoria, Stellenbosch University
- South Korea: Hanbat National University
- Syria: University of Damascus, Arab International University
- United States: University of South Carolina, University of Alabama, University of Florida, Illinois Institute of Technology

== Rankings ==
University rankings

Overall – Global & National
QS World 2024	611–620	36
ARWU World 2023	601–700	37–40

The university is recognized in several university ranking systems. In the 2024 QS World University Rankings, it was placed in the 611–620 bracket worldwide and ranked 36th nationally. Similarly, the Academic Ranking of World Universities (ARWU) positioned the university within the 601–700 range globally and between 37th and 40th at a national level in its 2023 edition.

== Notable people ==
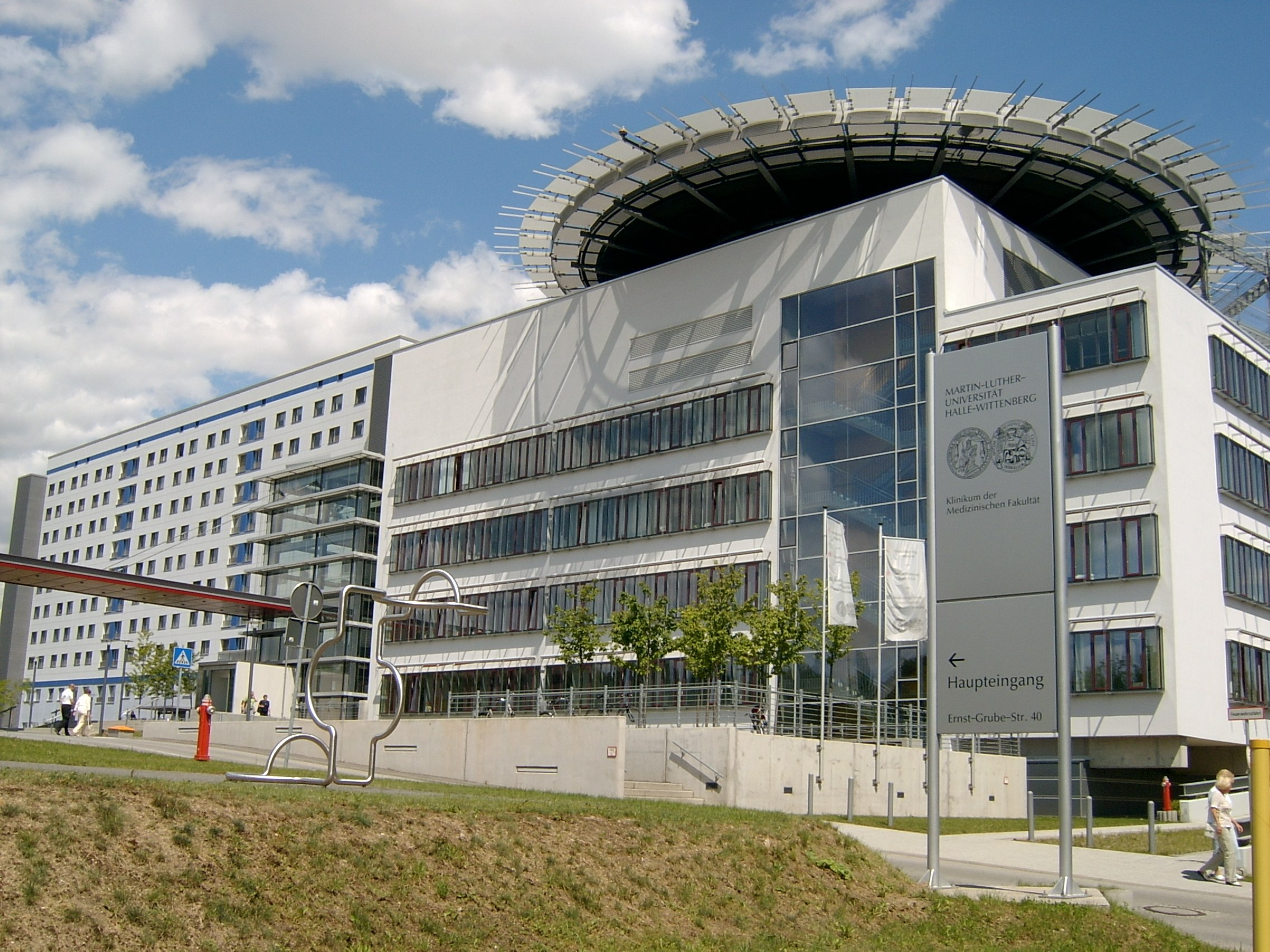
University Hospital, Halle.

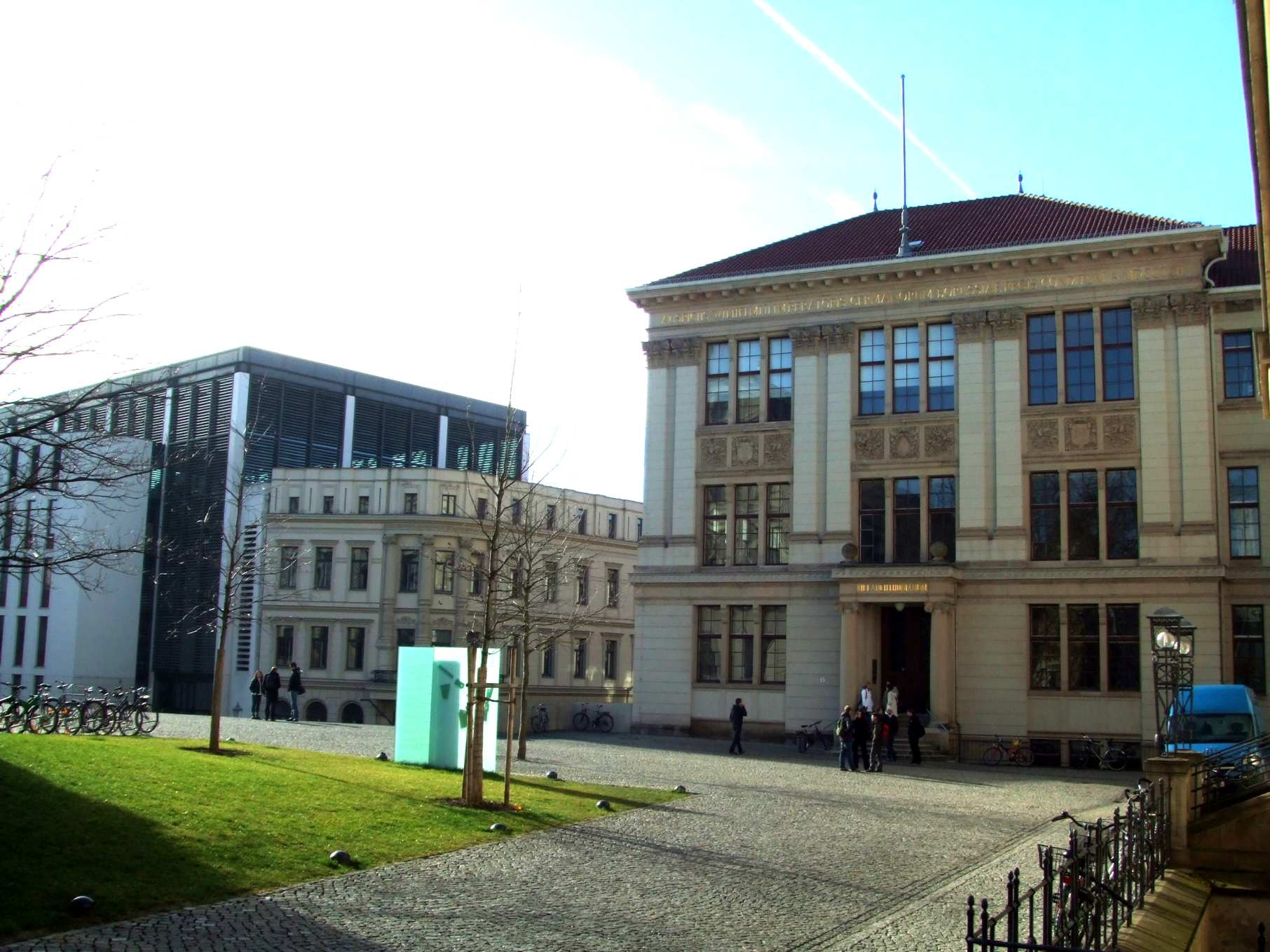
Melanchthoneanum (on the right) and Juridicum (on the left).

Given the history and reputation of MLU, numerous notable personalities attended the institution, such as Nobel laureates Emil Adolf von Behring, Gustav Ludwig Hertz, Hermann Staudinger and Karl Ziegler, as well as Georg Cantor (mathematician known for set theory and the theory of infinity), Hermann Ebbinghaus (psychologist who pioneered the experimental study of memory), Anton Wilhelm Amo (the first coloured Sub-Saharan African known to have attended a European university), Dorothea Erxleben (the first female medical doctor in Germany), Henry Melchior Muhlenberg, the Patriarch of the Lutheran Church in America, and his son, Frederick Muhlenberg (the first Speaker of the House of Representatives of the United States), and Hans Dietrich Genscher (Germany's longest serving Foreign Minister and Vice Chancellor).

== Cultural references ==
The University of Wittenberg is the alma mater of Prince Hamlet (as well as his acquaintances Rosencrantz and Guildenstern and Horatio) in William Shakespeare's play Hamlet, and of the titular magician in Christopher Marlowe's play Doctor Faustus.

== See also ==
- List of early modern universities in Europe
- List of Martin Luther University of Halle-Wittenberg people
