= Vocation =

Occupation to which a person is especially drawn or for which they are especially suited

A vocation (from Latin vocatio 'a call, summons') is an occupation to which a person is especially drawn or for which they are suited, trained, or qualified. Although the term is now often used in non-religious contexts and is related to cultivating motivated, self-directed, and positively engaged individuals within organizations, its meaning originally emerged within Christianity.

A calling is also a vocation; however, it is used in the religious sense. The word refers to a religious vocation (derived from the Latin word for “call”), which may be professional or voluntary and may differ across religions. The source of such a calling may arise from within oneself, from another person for those with less personal insight, or, for those who claim heightened extrasensory perception or experience mixed brain signalling, from a perceived divine messenger.

== History ==
The idea of a vocation or "calling" has played a significant role within Christianity. Since the early days of the Christian faith, the term has applied to candidates for the clergy. It soon began to be applied to those who felt drawn to a more rigorous observance of their faith through the contemplative lifestyle of the hermits and monks and nuns.

Use of the word "vocation" before the sixteenth century referred firstly to the "call" from God to an individual, or calling of all humankind to salvation, particularly in the Vulgate, and more specifically to the "vocation" to the priesthood, or to the religious life, which is still the usual sense in Roman Catholicism, although Pope John Paul II refers to marriage as "a true vocation and mission" alongside religious life and ordained ministry.

Martin Luther, followed by John Calvin, placed a particular emphasis on vocations, or divine callings, as potentially including most secular occupations, though this idea was by no means new. Later, Martin Luther taught that each individual was expected to fulfill their God-appointed task in everyday life. Although the Lutheran concept of the calling emphasized vocation, there was no particular emphasis on labor beyond what was required for one's daily bread.

Reformed Christianity transformed the idea of the calling by emphasizing relentless, disciplined labor. Calvin defined the role of "the Christian in his vocation", noting that God has prescribed appointed duties to men and styled such spheres of life vocations or callings. Calvinists distinguished two callings: a general calling to serve God and a particular calling to engage in some employment by which one's usefulness is determined. Calvinism developed complex ideas about different types of vocations of the first type, connected with the concepts of predestination, irresistible grace, and the elect. There are the vocatio universalis, the vocatio specialis, only extended to some. There were also complex distinctions between internal and external, and the "vocatio efficax" and "inefficax" types of callings. Hyper-Calvinism rejects the idea of a "universal call", a vocation, to repent and believe, held by virtually all other Christian groups. The Puritan minister Cotton Mather discussed the obligations of the personal calling, writing of "some special business, and some settled business, wherein a Christian should for the most part spend the most of his time; so he may glorify God by doing good for himself". Mather admonished that it was not lawful ordinarily to live without some calling: "for men will fall into "horrible snares and infinite sins"". This idea has endured throughout the history of Protestantism. Almost three centuries after John Calvin's death in 1564 Thomas Carlyle would proclaim, "The latest Gospel in this world is, 'know thy work and do it.'"

The legacy of this religious ethic continues to exert its influence in secular Western society. Modern occupations which are seen as vocations often include those where a combination of skill and community help are implied, such as medical, care-giving, and veterinary occupations. Occupations where rewards are seen more in spiritual or other non-financial terms, such as religious occupations, are also seen as vocations. Borderline occupations, where community service and more personal reward are more evenly balanced, such as politics, may often be regarded as vocations.

== Senses ==
In Protestantism, the call from God to devote one's life to him by joining the clergy is often covered by the English equivalent term "call" or "vocation", whereas in Roman Catholicism the term "vocation" is generally used.

Both senses of the word "call" are used in 1 Corinthians 7:20, where Paul says "Let every man abide in the same calling wherein he was called".

=== Concept ===
The idea of vocation is central to the Christian belief that God has created each person with gifts and talents oriented toward specific purposes and a way of life. In the broadest sense, as stated in the Catechism of the Catholic Church, "Love is the fundamental and innate vocation of every human being". More specifically, in the Eastern Orthodox and Catholic Churches, this idea of vocation is especially associated with a divine call to service to the Church and humanity through particular vocational life commitments such as marriage to a particular person, consecration as a religious dedication, ordination to priestly ministry in the Church and even a holy life as a single person. In the broader sense, Christian vocation includes the use of one's gifts in their profession, family life, church and civic commitments for the sake of the greater common good.

== Distinctions among different Christian denominations ==
=== Oriental Orthodoxy and Eastern Orthodoxy ===
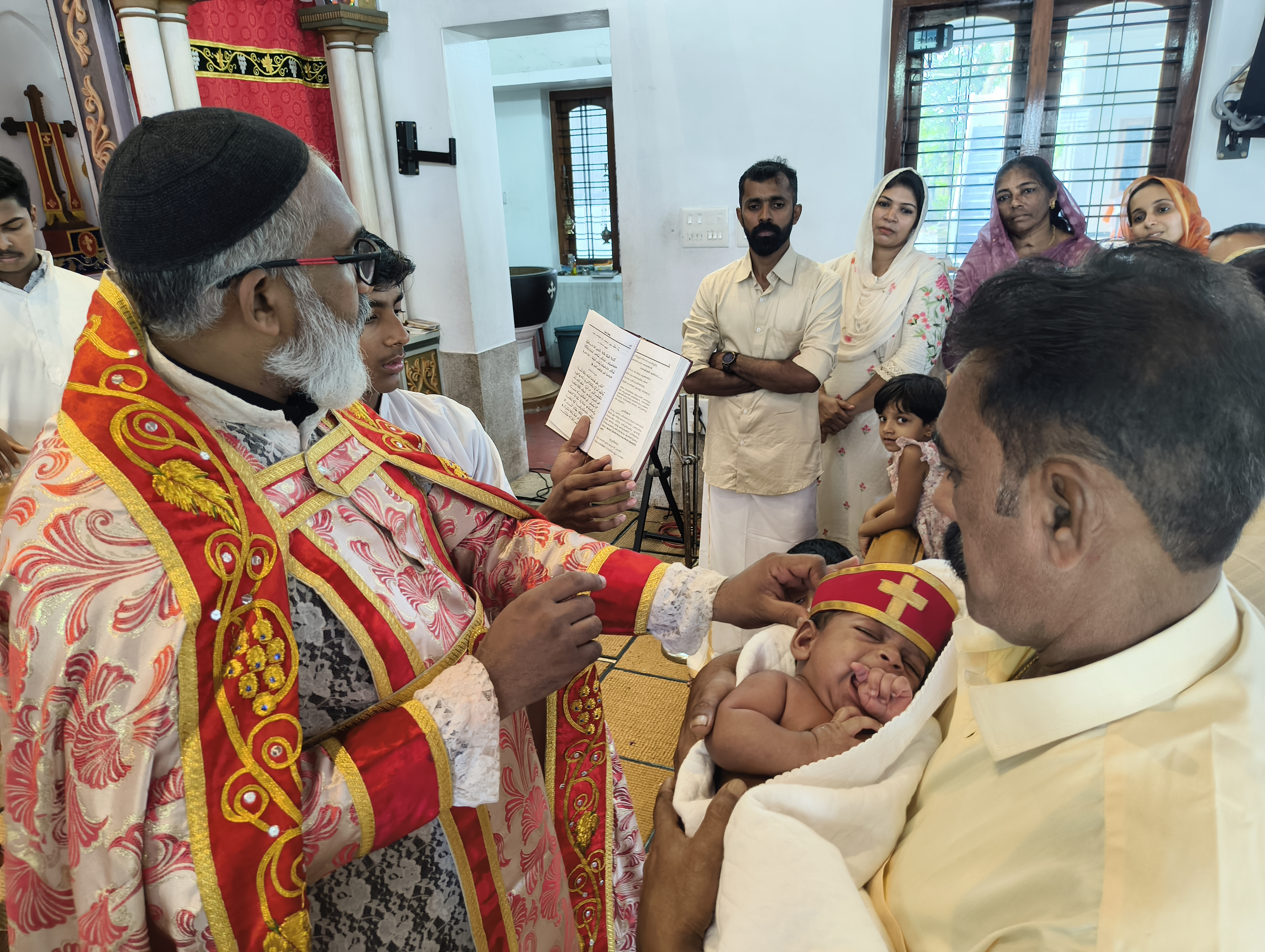
An Indian Orthodox priest administers the sacrament of baptism.

The Orthodox Church in America teaches:

Everyone has a vocation. And all vocations are “religious.” This does not mean that everyone is called to serve the church in a professional manner; to be a bishop, priest, deacon, monk, nun, psalmreader or church worker of one sort or another. Obviously not all are called to these specifically ecclesiastical ministries. But everyone is called to serve God and their fellow human beings in some form of life which God Himself wills.

=== Catholicism ===
In the Catholic Church, a candidate to the diaconate and priesthood is referred to as being called to this service in the Church. The term is also used for those in consecrated life. Priests, deacons, religious and lay people all have "vocations".

=== Evangelical Lutheranism ===
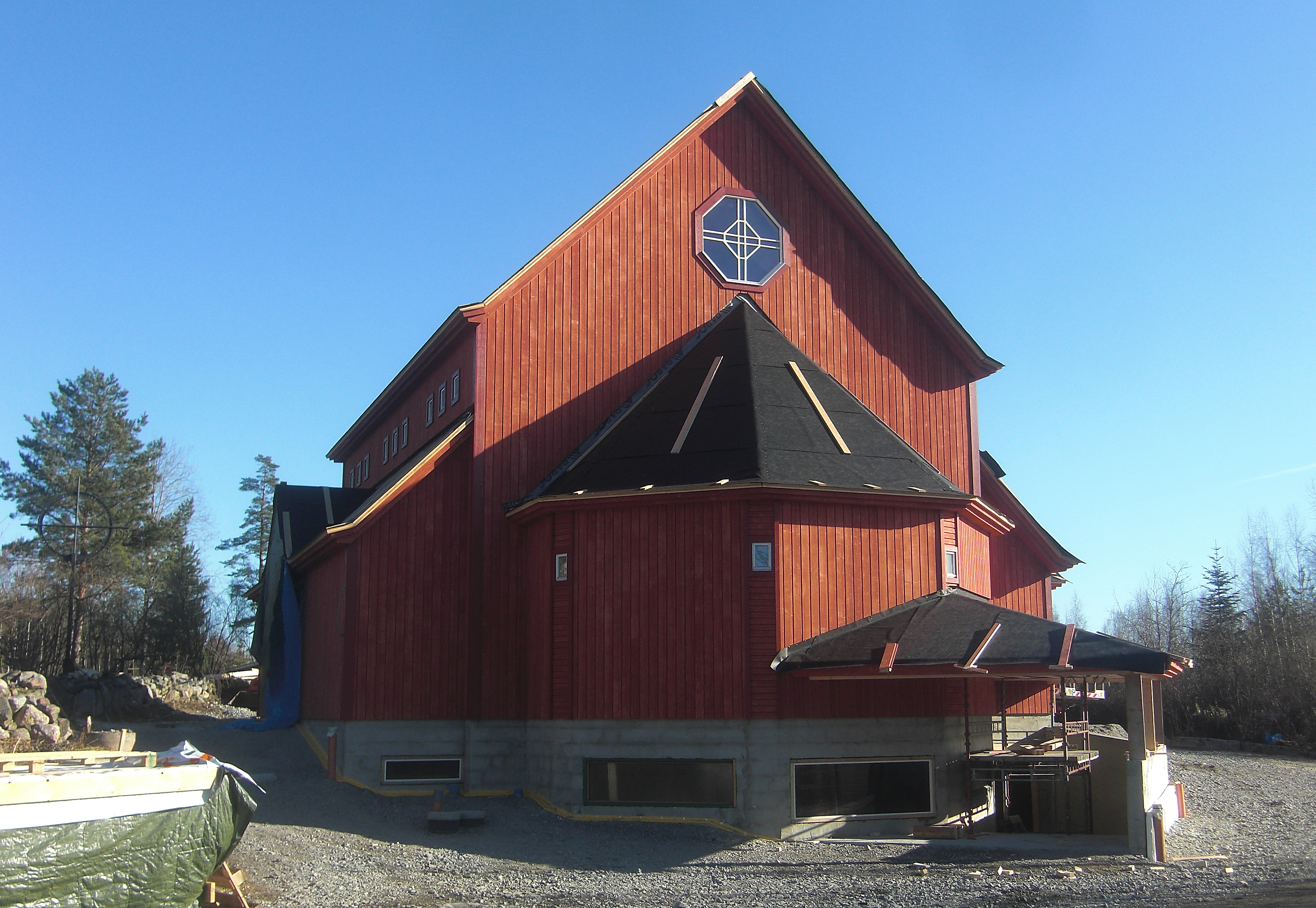
Östanbäck Monastery is an Evangelical Lutheran monastery in the Benedictine tradition. Mass is offered daily, and the Divine Office is prayed by monks seven times a day.

In Evangelical Lutheranism, the discernment of an individual's vocation or calling includes categories of priesthood, religious life, as well as to "all our duties and responsibilities". For those who possess a call from God to serve the Church as a priest, "it is a vocation that requires a genuine faith commitment with serious implications for how the priest lives her or his life." Those Evangelical-Lutherans desiring religious life may become a religious brother or religious sister, or they may become a monk or a nun (residing in a monastery or convent); solemn vows of poverty, chasity, and obedience are taken (cf. Daughters of Mary and The Congregation of the Servants of Christ).

=== Reformed (Continental Reformed, Anglican, Congregationalist, and Presbyterian) ===
In Reformed churches, the decision of a church to invite for appointment a particular minister - to "invite in due form to the pastorate of a church (Presbyterian or Nonconformist)" (OED) may be referred to as a call, such as extending a call to so and so, and is first cited from 1560 by the OED.

=== Baptist and Methodist ===
Among Baptists and Methodists, the sense of deliberate purpose before God is generally an expected part of the choice to seek ministerial work in the first place and is often referred to as a calling or call.

=== Latter-day Saints ===
The Church of Jesus Christ of Latter-day Saints describes a calling as "a duty, position, or responsibility in the church that is issued to a member by priesthood leaders. . . . [it is] an opportunity to serve." The church uses a lay clergy, with most members receiving no compensation for the execution of their callings. Prominent church leader J. Reuben Clark said, "In the service of the Lord, it is not where you serve but how. In the [church], one takes the place to which one is duly called, which place one neither seeks nor declines." Prior to beginning service, a person is presented to church membership for a sustaining vote to that calling. The person is then set apart to serve in the calling by the laying on of hands.

== Contemporary views on vocation ==
Since the establishment of Vocational Guidance in 1908 by the engineer Frank Parsons, the use of the term "vocation" has evolved, with emphasis shifting to an individual's development of talents and abilities in the choice and enjoyment of a career. This semantic expansion has meant some diminution of reference to the term's religious meanings in everyday usage.

Leland Ryken argues for seeing the call of God to a particular occupation as a reflection of the gospel call, and suggests that this implies vocational loyalty: "modern notions of job become deficient" and "the element of arbitrariness of one's choice of work" is removed.

Pope Francis saw business as a "noble vocation", noting in its favour that it produces wealth and prosperity and "improves our world", especially when "it sees the creation of jobs as an essential part of its service to the common good".

== Literary clarification ==
These books have attempted to define or clarify the term vocation.

- Live Your Calling: A Practical Guide to Finding and Fulfilling Your Mission in Life by Kevin and Kay Marie Brennfleck (ISBN 978-0787968953)
- States of the Christian life and vocation, according to the doctors and theologians of the Church by Jean-Baptiste Berthier
- A Theology of the Laity by Hendrik Kraemer (ISBN 978-1-57383-031-7)
- Living Your Heart's Desire: God's Call and Your Vocation by Gregory S. Clapper (ISBN 978-0-8358-9805-8)
- The Fabric of this World by Lee Hardy (ISBN 978-0-8028-0298-9)
- Your Work Matters to God by Doug Sherman and William Hendricks (ISBN 978-0-89109-372-5)
- The Call by Os Guinness (ISBN 978-0-8499-4437-6)
- The Preaching Life by Barbara Brown Taylor (ISBN 978-1-56101-074-5)
- Let Your Life Speak by Parker J. Palmer (ISBN 978-0-7879-4735-4)
- Lay People in the Church: A Study for a Theology of the Laity by Yves M.J. Congar, O.P. Translated by Donald Attwater, 1959
- Luther on Vocation by Gustaf Wingren, 1957
- God at Work: Your Christian Vocation in All of Life by Gene Edward Veith Jr. (ISBN 1-58134-403-1)
- The Fabric of Faithfulness by Steven Garber (ISBN 0-8308-1994-0)
- Visions of Vocation by Steven Garber (ISBN 978-0-8308-3666-6)

== See also ==
- Anticipatory socialization
- Career and Life Planning Education
- Effectual calling
- List of largest employers
- Otium
- Profession
- Religious calling
- Trade (occupation)
- Tech certificate
- Vocational discernment in the Catholic Church
- Vocational education
