= Arbetsgemenskapen Kyrklig Förnyelse =

Church of Sweden high-church organisation

Arbetsgemenskapen Kyrklig Förnyelse (aKF), The Church Union in Church of Sweden, is the umbrella organisation for the Lutheran High Church movement in the Church of Sweden.

The organisation's beginnings were originally inspired by the book "Kyrklig förnyelse" by Father Gunnar Rosendal and it already existed a long time before its official foundation on 28 April 1959. The annual assembly of aKF is in Uppsala in August. Theologically the aKF is orthodox and in opposition to Folk Church ideology and the general theological liberalism in the Church of Sweden. One well known member of this organisation was a Swedish-Canadian scholar Eric Segelberg.

The aKF's sister organisations are The Church Union in the Church of England, Bønne- og arbeidsfellesskapet Kirkelig Fornyelse in Norway, Arbeitsgemeinschaft Kirchliche Erneuerung in der Evang.-Luth. Kirche in Bayern in Germany, and Kirkelig Fornyelse in Church of Denmark.

== Chairmen of aKF ==
1. The Very Reverend Dr Gustaf Adolf Danell (Dean of Växjö)
2. The Right Reverend Dr Dr Olof Herrlin (Bishop of Visby)
3. The Very Reverend Dr Per-Olof Sjögren (Dean of Gothenburg)
4. The Right Reverend Dr Bertil Gärtner (Bishop of Gothenburg)
5. The Reverend Dr Bengt Holmberg (Professor in New Testament Exegesis, Lund)
6. The Very Reverend Ove Lundin (Dean of Visby)
