= Förbundet för Kristen Enhet =

Swedish ecumenical association

- Abbreviation: FKE
- Formation: 23 November 1965
- Purpose: Christian unity between the Church of Sweden and the Catholic Church
- Location: Sweden

Förbundet för Kristen Enhet (English: League for Christian Unity, FKE) is an association of members of the Church of Sweden and the Catholic Church who work for a united visible church with the Bishop of Rome as the unifying figure. The League was formed in 1965 with the goal of eventually achieving visible unity between the Church of Sweden and the Roman Catholic Church.

FKE was formed on 23 November 1965 at the Sisterhood of Jesus' Mother Mary in Malmö by the later bishops Biörn Fjärstedt and Martin Lind, and by Caesarius Cavallin, Ingmar Svantesson and Andreas Rask OSB. The union was formed against what they believed was a rigid official Swedish ecumenism that did not want to open up to a Roman Catholic co-celebration of the 40th anniversary of the Stockholm World Conference of Life and Work. In the autumn of 1960, information had come from Fr. Arthur Kreinheder, from United States, to his old St. Laurence Foundation at Lund about the German Sammlung movement with Hans Asmussen in the lead, and the formation of the Bund für evangelisch-katholische Wiedervereinigung in Germany with the Lutheran pastor Max Lackmann as a driving force.

The board of FKE will include representatives from both the Church of Sweden and the Roman Catholic Church. FKE also has theological advisors, who have been Professor Sven-Erik Brodd, who is an advisor to the Church of Sweden, and Björn Göransson, who is an advisor to the Catholic Church.

The association regularly organizes events. The League has presented its program in a book called Katolsk tro i Svenska kyrkan (Catholic Faith in Church of Sweden).

== See also ==
- High church Lutheranism
- Unitatis redintegratio
- Ut unum sint
- The Catholic League
- Anglicanorum coetibus
