= Hochkirchliche St.-Johannes-Bruderschaft =

Hochkirchliche St. Johannes-Bruderschaft (SJB) (High Church Brotherhood of St John) is a German High Church Lutheran religious society for men and women under the patronate of John the Apostle within the Hochkirchliche Vereinigung. It has about 100 members in Germany, Netherlands, Austria and Czech Republic. It is headed by Apostolischer Vorsteher +Innocenz Konrad Schrieder.

== The Rule ==
The aim of the confraternity is "the sacramental renewal of the Church, restorement of the apostolic succession in the Church and recovery of the unity of the christendom".

The Brotherhood is headed by Apostolischer Vorsteher, who is a bishop in apostolic succession. He is assisted by vicar apostolic, likewise bishop in apostolic succession. Brotherhood elects the vicar capitular and Apostolischer Vorsteher with more than 66,6% majority.

The Rule contains for example following:

- Members have regular prayer life and preferably say daily office using a breviary Chorgebet (2009) and whenever possible, in common with others.
- Priest members are committed to celebrate Eucharist every Sunday if possible and to take care that the eucharistic prayer contains also anamnesis and epiclesis after the rite Deutsche Messe (1926 renewed 2013).
- Members go regularly to private confession and priest members work for reanimation of the practice of the private confession in their parishes.
- Members of the Brotherhood follow fasting and abstinence rules of the western Church.
- They work by prayer, words, and deeds for peace, justice, and probation of the creation, collaboration of peoples and races. Members take part in the work of ecumenical movement.

== History ==
St. Johannes-Bruderschaft's predecessor "Evangelisch-Katholische Eucharistische Gemeinschaft" (Evangelical Catholic Eucharistic Society) was founded 1929 in Germany. It was forbidden 1937 in Nazi Germany because of its resistance to Aryan paragraphs and Internationalism, but was founded again in 1947 as "Evangelische-Ökumenische St.-Johannes-Bruderschaft".

The first Apostolischer Vorsteher of the confraternity was Friedrich Heiler (1929–1967). He arranged to receive the episcopal consecration from a bishop of the independent Gallican Church (Petite L'Eglise) in Syrian-orthodox tradition. On August 25, 1930, Heiler received from the hands of the Gallican Bishop Petrus Gaston Vigué, using the Roman Ritual, all the Holy Orders including the episcopate.

=== Apostolic succession in St. Johannes-Bruderschaft ===
- 129. Antonius (Franz X. Alvarez) - 1889
- 130. Timotheus (René J. Vilatte) - 1892
- 131. Paulus (Miraglia) - 1900
- 132. Julius (Houssaye) - 1904
- 133. Ludwig (Francois Giraud) - 1911
- 134. Petrus (Gaston Vigué) - 1928
- 135. IRENÄUS (FRIEDRICH HEILER) - 1930
- 136. Cyrillus (Martin Giebner) - 1941
- 137. Ambrosius (Konrad Minkner) - 1952
- 138. Werner (Ernst Linz) - 1963
- 139. Johannes (Klaus Ewert) - 1964
- 140. Donatus (Albrecht Volkmann) - 1971
- 141. Simeon (Dietrich Schulze) - 1979
- 142. Herman (Herman Miskotte) - 1980
- 143. Joachim (Joachim Nerger) - 1988
- 144. Paulus (Klaus Jacoby) - 1992
- 145. Augustinus (Wolfgang Tischendorf) - 2006
- 146. Innocenz (Konrad Schrieder) - 2012
- 147. Thomas (Bernd Feise) - 2013
- 148. Martin (Friedhelm Bürgener) - 2013

== See also ==
- Helmut Echternach
- Hochkirchlicher Apostolat St. Ansgar
