= Religious order =

Groups based on religious devotion

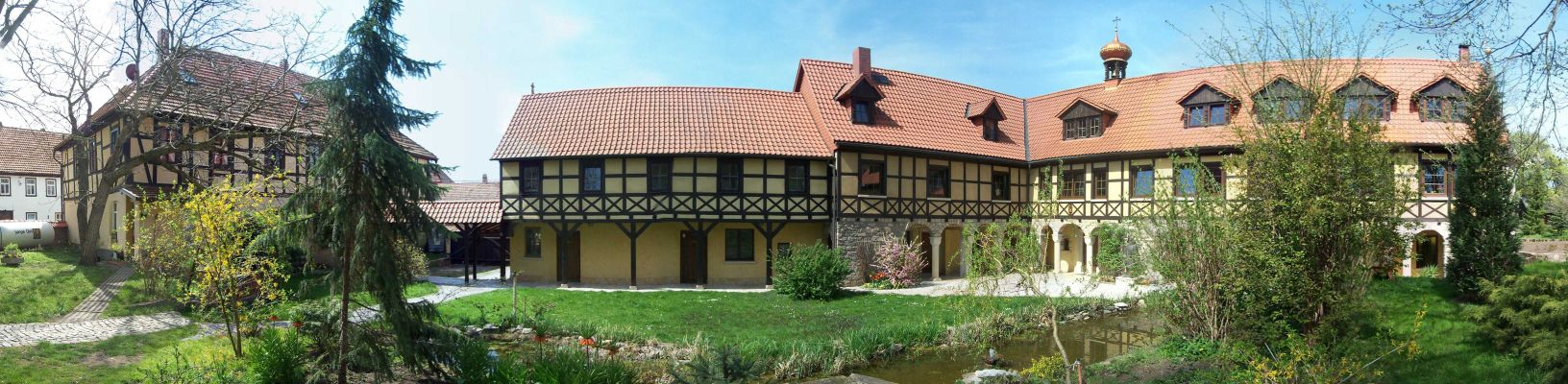
The Priory of St. Wigbert is a Lutheran monastery in the Benedictine tradition

A religious order is a subgroup within a larger confessional community that has members who lead a contemplative lifestyle devoted to prayer and service. Religious orders often trace their lineage from their founders and have a text describing their lifestyle called a rule of life. Such orders exist in a number of the world's religions and their denominations.

== Buddhism ==
In Buddhist societies, a religious order is one of the number of monastic orders of monks and nuns, many of which follow a certain school of teaching—such as Thailand's Dhammayuttika order, a monastic order founded by King Mongkut (Rama IV). A well-known Chinese Buddhist order is the ancient Shaolin order in Ch'an (Zen) Buddhism; and in modern times, the Order of Hsu Yun.

== Christianity ==
=== Catholic tradition ===
A religious order in the Catholic Church is a kind of religious institute, a society whose members (referred to as "religious") make solemn vows that are accepted by a superior in the name of the Church, who wear a religious habit and who live a life of brothers or sisters in common. Religious orders are to be distinguished from religious congregations, which are religious institutes whose members profess simple vows, and from secular institutes, including societies of apostolic life and lay ecclesial movements. Unless they are also deacons or priests in Holy Orders members of religious orders are not clergy but laity. However, particular orders and institutes are classified as either specifically clerical or lay depending on their charism.

Among the traditional forms of solemnly vowed religious order, there are four key categories:

- canons regular (canons and canonesses regular who recite the Divine Office and serve a church and perhaps a parish);
- clerics regular (priests who take religious vows and have an active apostolic life);
- mendicants (friars and religious sisters, possibly living and working in a friary or a convent, who live from alms, recite the Divine Office, and, in the case of the men, participate in apostolic activities); and
- monastics (monks and nuns living and working in a monastery or a nunnery and reciting the Divine Office).

Religious life began in the Latin Church as early as the 3rd century, with the Order of Saint Benedict being formed in the 6th, in 529. All the earliest religious foundations were either essentially monastic or canonical depending on how much weight they placed on monastic enclosure or pastoral care respectively. Initially rules of life tended to vary between communities but gradually by the 10th century the Rule of St Benedict became the standardised norm among the Latin Church’s monks and nuns while the Rule of St Augustine was standardised among its canons and canonesses. The earliest orders include the Cistercians (1098), the Premonstratensians (1120), the Poor Clares founded by Francis of Assisi (1212), and the Benedictine reform movements of Cluny (1216). These orders consist entirely of independent abbeys and priories where power rests in the hands of the individual communities and their abbot or abbess, prior or prioress. Their members remain in the same community for life.

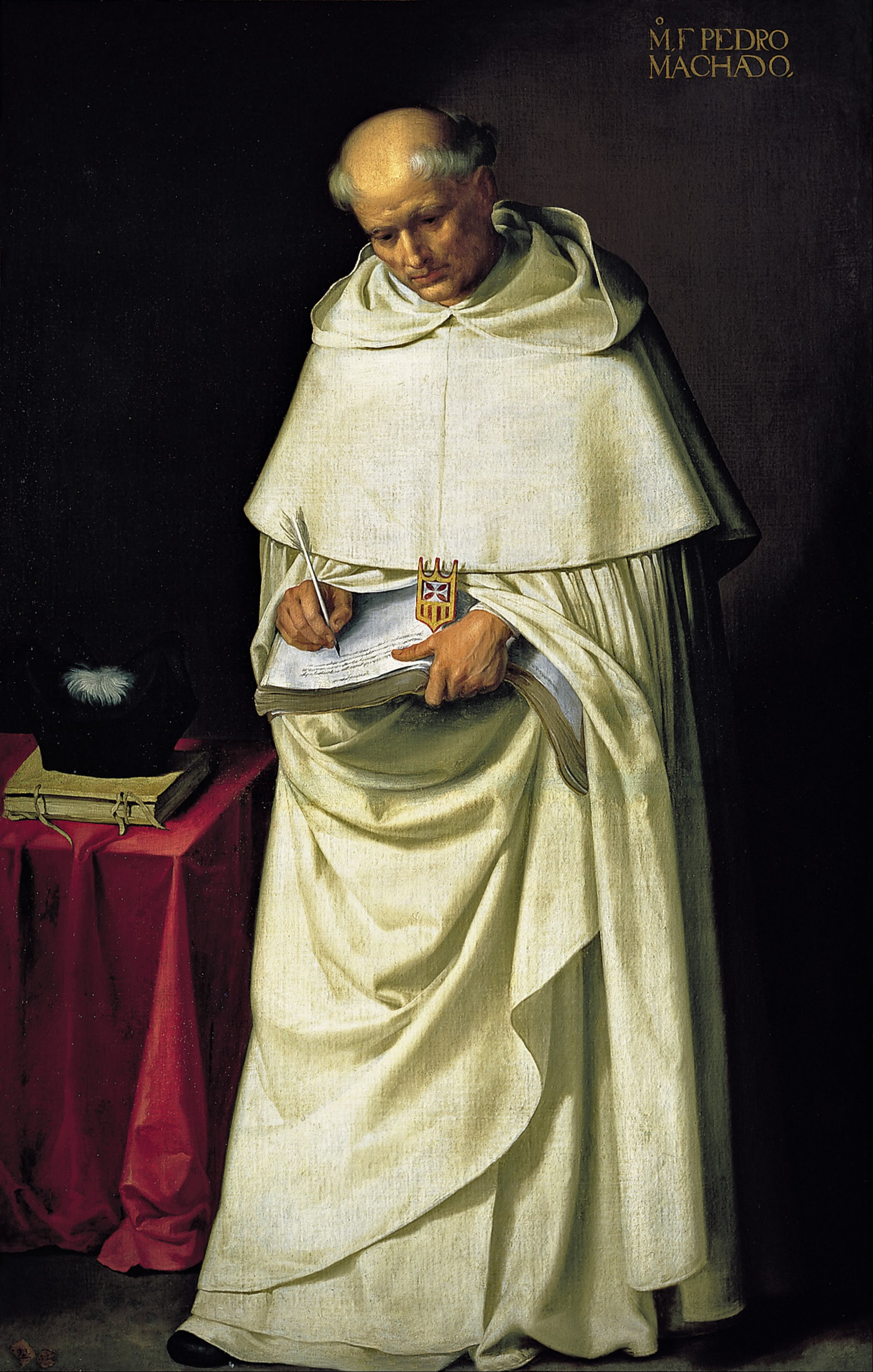
Francisco de Zurbarán's painting of a Mercedarian Friar, Fra Pedro Machado

Later in the 13th century the mendicant orders like the Carmelites, the Order of Friars Minor, the Order of Preachers, the Order of the Most Holy Trinity and the Order of Saint Augustine formed. These Mendicant orders did not hold property for their Religious Communities, instead begging for alms and going where they were needed. Their leadership structure included each member, as opposed to each Abbey or House, as subject to their direct superior. In the 16th century the orders of clerics regular began to emerge, including such institutes as the Society of Jesus, the Theatines, the Barnabites, the Somascans. Most of these groups began to turn away from the common public celebration of the divine office.

In accordance with the concept of independent communities in the Rule of Saint Benedict, the Benedictines, Cistercians, and Trappists have autonomous abbeys (so-called "independent houses"). Their members profess "stability" to the abbeys where they make their religious vows; hence their abbots or abbesses may not move them to other abbeys. An "independent house" may occasionally make a new foundation which remains a "dependent house" (identified by the name "priory") until it is granted independence by Rome and itself becomes an abbey. Each house's autonomy does not prevent it being affiliated into a congregation—whether national or based on some other joint characteristic—and these, in turn, form the supra-national Benedictine Confederation.

Non-monastic religious institutes typically have a motherhouse, generalate, or general curia with jurisdiction over any number of dependent religious communities, whose members may be moved by their superior general to its other communities as the institute's needs require.

Well-known Roman Catholic religious institute include Augustinians, Basilians, Benedictines, Bethlehemites, Bridgettines, Camaldolese, Carmelites, Carthusians, Cistercians, Conceptionists, Crosiers, Dominicans, Franciscans, Hieronymites, Jesuits, Minims, Piarists, Salesians, Olivetans, Theatines, Trappists and the Visitandines.

Several religious orders evolved during the Crusades to incorporate a military mission becoming "religious military orders", such as the Knights of the Order of Saint John of Jerusalem, the Knights of the Order of the Temple and the Knights of the Holy Sepulchre.

=== Orthodox tradition ===
In the Eastern Orthodox Church, there is only one type of monasticism. The profession of monastics is known as tonsure (referring to the ritual cutting of the monastic's hair which takes place during the service) and is considered by monks to be a Sacred Mystery (Sacrament). The Rite of Tonsure is printed in the Euchologion (Church Slavonic: Trebnik), the same book as the other Sacred Mysteries and services performed according to need.

=== Lutheran tradition ===
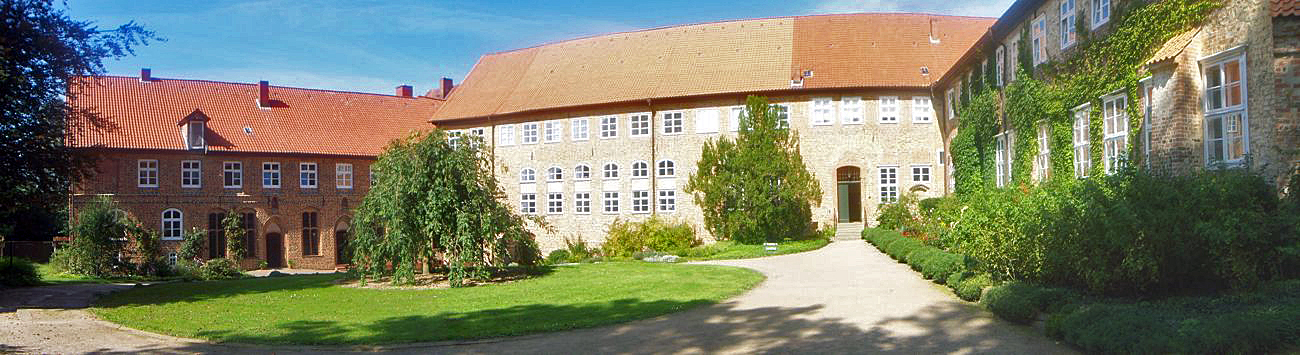
Ebstorf Abbey continued as a Lutheran convent in the Benedictine tradition since 1529

After the foundation of the Lutheran churches, some monasteries in Lutheran lands (such as Amelungsborn Abbey near Negenborn and Loccum Abbey in Rehburg-Loccum) and convents (such as Ebstorf Abbey near the town of Uelzen and Bursfelde Abbey in Bursfelde) adopted the Lutheran Christian faith.

Other examples of Lutheran religious orders include the Order of Lutheran Franciscans in the United States. Also, a Lutheran religious order following the Rule of Saint Benedict, The Congregation of the Servants of Christ, was established at St. Augustine's House in Oxford, Michigan, in 1958 when some other men joined Father Arthur Kreinheder in observing the monastic life and offices of prayer. This order has strong ties to Benedictine Lutheran religious orders in Sweden (Östanbäck Monastery) and in Germany (Priory of St. Wigbert).

=== Anglican tradition ===
Religious orders in England were dissolved by King Henry VIII upon the separation of the English church from Roman primacy. For three hundred years, there were no formal religious orders in Anglicanism, although some informal communities – such as the Little Gidding community – occasionally sprang into being. With the advent of the Oxford Movement in the Church of England and worldwide Anglicanism in the middle of the 19th century, several orders appeared. In 1841, the first order for women was established. The first order for men was founded 25 years later.

Anglican religious voluntarily commit themselves for life, or a term of years, to holding their possessions in common or in trust; to a celibate life in community; and obedience to their Rule and Constitution.

There are presently thirteen active religious orders for men, fifty-three for women, and eight mixed gender.

=== Methodist tradition ===
The Methodist Church of Great Britain, and its ancestors, have established a number of orders of Deaconesses, who are now ordained as clergy and are Ministers in equal standing alongside their presbyteral colleagues. The Methodist Diaconal Order (MDO) currently admits both men and women to the Order and all are now known as Deacons. Since the functions of a deacon are primarily pastoral, the MDO may therefore be regarded as an order of Regular clerics.

The Order of the Flame is a religious order under the auspices of the World Methodist Council devoted to the charism of evangelism.

The Order of Saint Luke is a religious order in the United Methodist Church dedicated to sacramental and liturgical scholarship, education, and practice.

=== Anabaptist tradition ===
Some Protestant religious orders follow Anabaptist theology. These would include the Hutterites and Bruderhof, who live in full community of goods and living as a peace church.

=== Jehovah's Witnesses ===
Among their corporations, the Religious Order of Jehovah's Witnesses cares for matters specific to Jehovah's Witnesses special full-time servants. In a particular branch, traveling overseers, special pioneers, and branch staff are considered members of the Order of Special Full-time Servants and the Bethel Family. Globally, their order is the Worldwide Order of Special Full-Time Servants of Jehovah's Witnesses. Male and female members of such religious orders typically make a formal vow of poverty and are granted certain status and exemptions by many governments. While Jehovah's Witnesses do not consider members of their religious orders to be a clergy separate from other Witnesses, who are also ordained ministers, they do recognize that a government may consider them such for administrative purposes.

Jehovah's Witnesses do not have a separate clergy class, but consider an adherent's qualified baptism to constitute his ordination as a minister. Governments have generally recognized that Jehovah's Witnesses' full-time appointees qualify as ministers regardless of sex or appointment as an elder or deacon ("ministerial servant"); the religion itself asserts what is sometimes termed "ecclesiastical privilege" only for its appointed elders.

== Islam ==
=== Sufis ===
A tariqah is how a religious order is described in Sufism. It especially refers to the mystical teaching and spiritual practices of such an order with the aim of seeking ḥaqīqah "ultimate truth". Such tariqas typically have a murshid (guide) who plays the role of leader or spiritual director. Members and followers of a tariqa are known as murīdīn (singular murīd), meaning "desirous", viz. "desiring the knowledge of knowing God and loving God" (also called a faqīr فقير). Tariqas have silsilas (Arabic: سلسلة) which is the spiritual lineage of the Shaikhs of that order. Almost all orders trace their silsila back to the Islamic prophet Muhammad. Tariqas are spread all over the Muslim world.

=== Shia ===
Among Shias, Noorbakshia Islam is an order that blends Sufi principles with Shia doctrine. It claims to trace its direct spiritual lineage and chain (silsilah) to the Islamic prophet Muhammad through Ali, the first imam of Shia Islam.

=== Salafi ===
There is some historical connection between certain schools of Sufism and the development of Wahhabism and Salafism due to the history of these denominations.

Ibn Abd al-Wahhab was inspired by Ibn Taymiyyah, a 14th-century scholar and dedicated Sufi, who is however remembered mainly as an outspoken critic of the excesses of certain schools of Sufism during his time.

== Other traditions ==
A form of ordered religious living is common also in many tribes and religions of Africa and South America, though on a smaller scale, and some parts of England. Due to the unorganized character of these small religious groups, orders are not as visible as in other well-organised religions.

Cults and coercive groups such as Scientology and Moonies often rely heavily on devout religious orders as a tactic to indoctrinate and control their followers. Scientology's Sea Org, for example, are required to sign a one billion year contract and pledge allegiance to founder L. Ron Hubbard and are responsible for senior management positions within the Organization.

== See also ==
- Asceticism
- Enclosed religious orders
- Monasticism
- Religious fanaticism
- Hyperreligiosity
- Mendicancy
- Religion-supporting organization
- Third order
- Military order (religious society)
