= Toivo Harjunpää =

Finnish-American Lutheran priest and professor

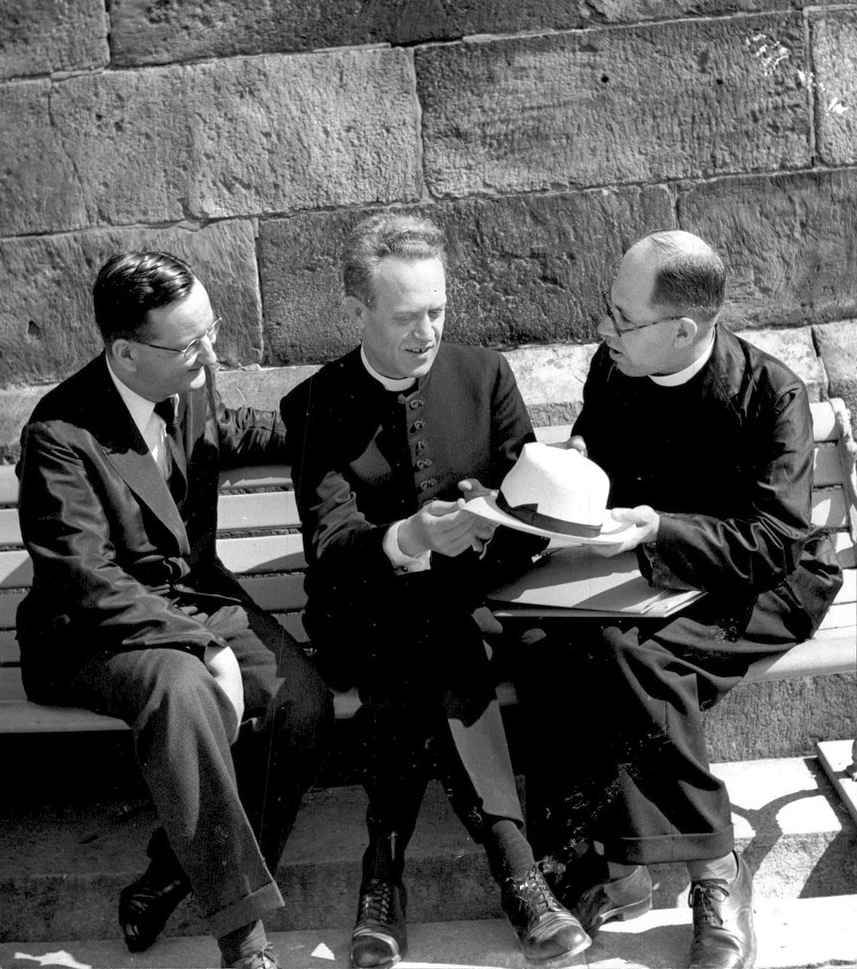
- Pastor Harjunpää (right) together with bishop Ordass and professor Janosso at the Lutheran world convention in Lund, June 1947
- Born: 2 June 1910
- Died: 21 September 1995 (aged 85)
- Occupations: priest and professor

Academic work
- Discipline: church history
- Institutions: Pacific Lutheran Theological Seminary; Graduate Theological Union

Kalle Toivo Immanuel Harjunpää (Finnish pronunciation: [ˈtoi̯ʋo ˈhɑrjumpæː]; 2 June 1910 – 21 September 1995) was a Finnish and American Lutheran priest and professor.

== Background ==
Harjunpää was born in Rauma, Finland. Harjunpää was ordained to the priesthood 18 February 1936 in Turku Cathedral. His background was in the Finnish Evangelical Revivalist Movement, originating from the activity of neo-Lutheran priest Fredrik Gabriel Hedberg. As a young priest while learning the New Testament, he was convinced of the importance of Christian ecumenism which was unpopular at that time in Finland. Soon after that Yngve Brilioth's book Eucharistic Faith and Practise. Evangelical and Catholic and Hans Liezmann's Messe und Herrenmal gave him more direction towards the Ecumenical Movement and Liturgical Movement.

== Career ==
After short curacy in Vehmaa and a job in the student union of his revivalist movement, Harjunpää became pastor of Finnish Seamen's Mission in London from 1938 to 1945, and the secretary of Archbishop Aleksi Lehtonen from 1945 to 1948. Together with Martti Parvio he founded a high church circle which was informally referred to as "Liturgical Brethren."

In May 1948, Harjunpää immigrated to the United States. He became a teacher at Pacific Lutheran Theological Seminary in 1953 and was professor of church history of the Graduate Theological Union from 1963 until 1977, when he retired. He was member of many Lutheran commissions on Hymnology and liturgy. He was also member of Societas Sanctae Birgittae.

Harjunpää died at his home in Berkeley, California in 1995.
