= High church Lutheranism =

Movement in Lutheranism

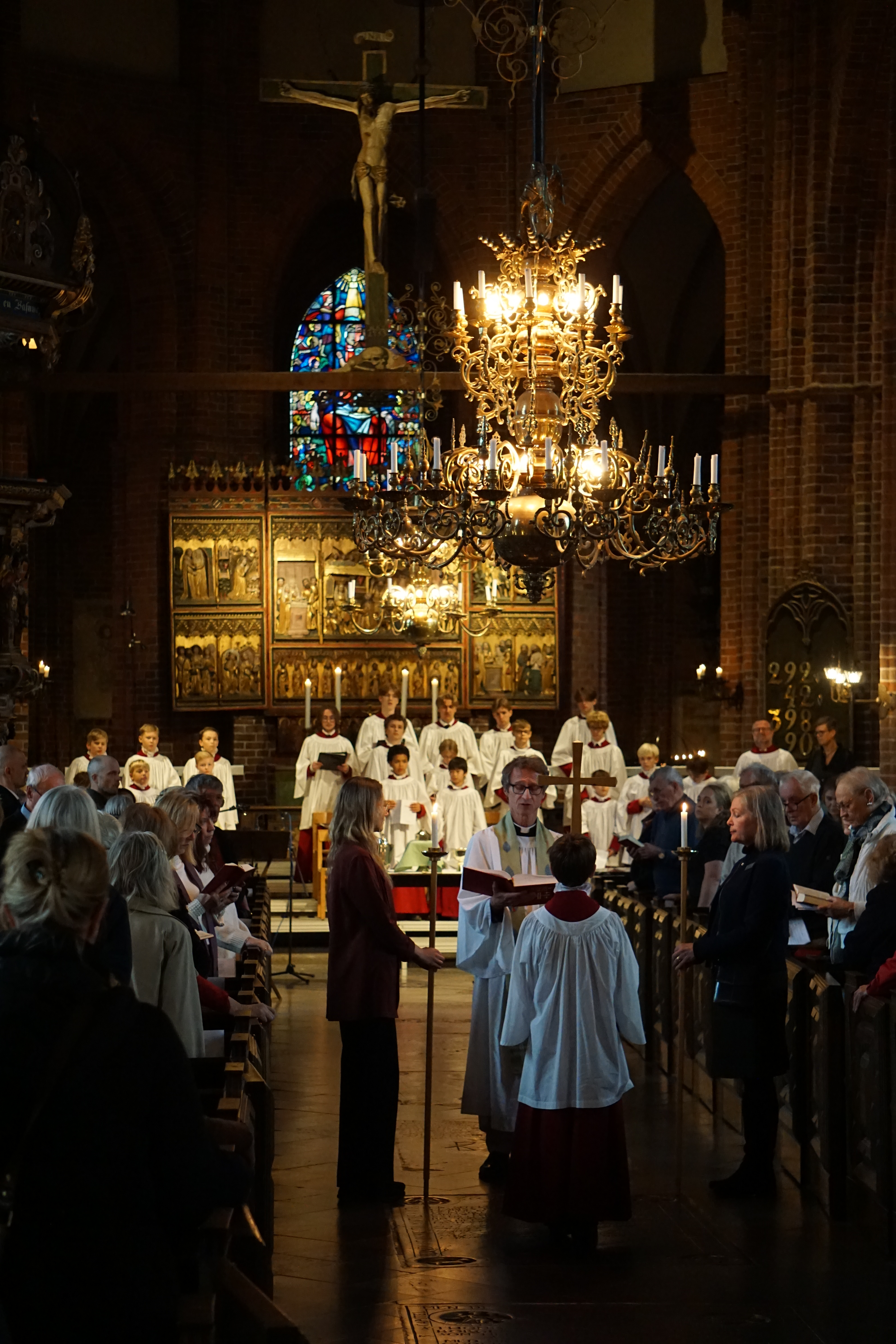
Gospel procession in St Mary's Church, Helsingborg with a processional cross, robed choir and the priest wearing vestments following the colours of the liturgical year.

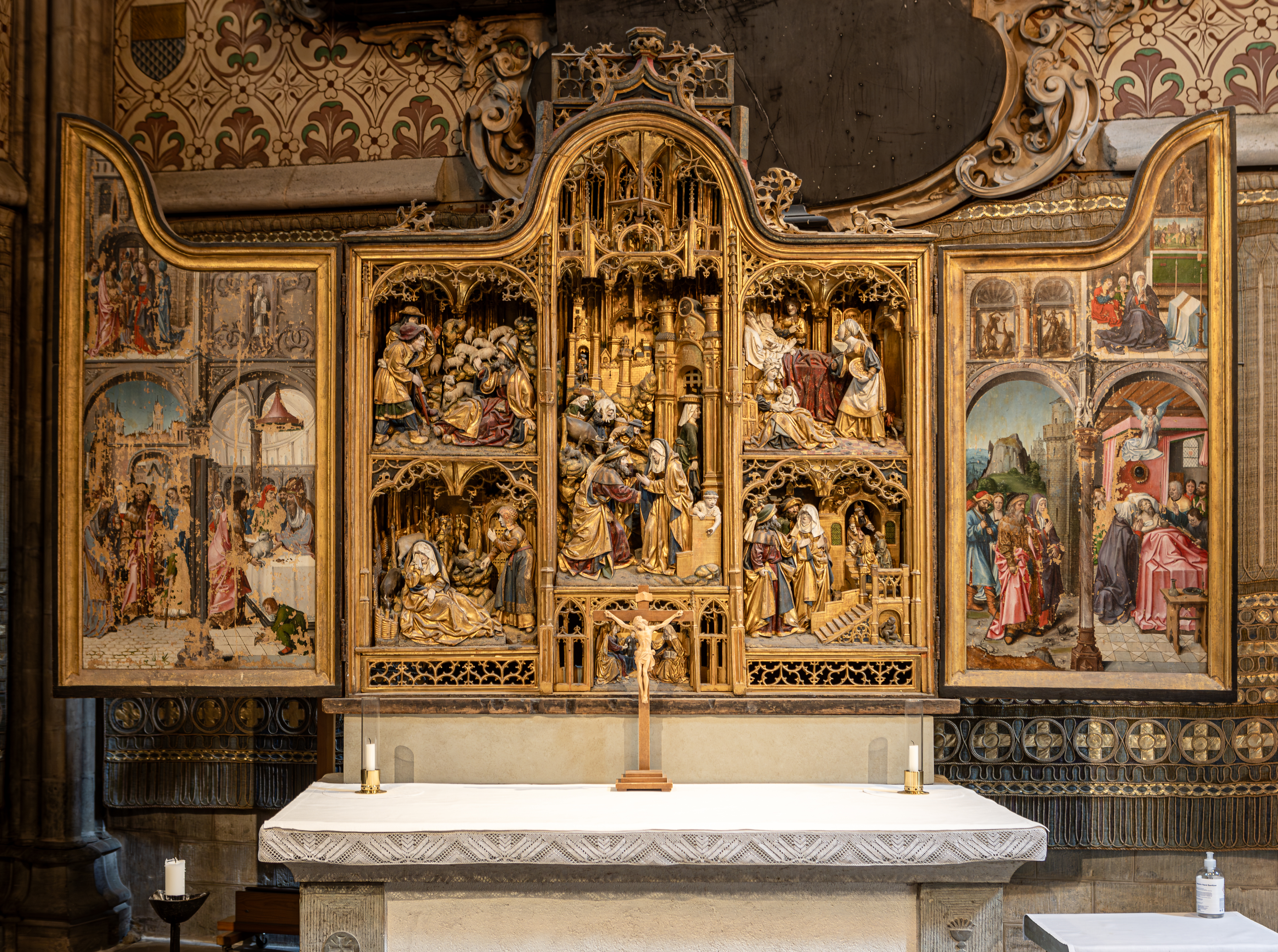
Altarpiece in Uppsala Cathedral of the Church of Sweden

High church Lutheranism is a movement that began in 20th-century Europe and emphasizes worship practices and doctrines that emphasize the sacraments and liturgy, along with a robust devotional life. In the more general usage of the term, it describes the general high church characteristics of Lutheranism in Nordic and Baltic countries such as Sweden, Finland, Estonia and Latvia. The mentioned countries have more markedly preserved pre-Reformation, Catholic traditions and eschewed Reformed theology. From the earliest part of its development, Lutheranism as a whole has employed elaborate liturgies and ornate sacred art. Lutheranism has viewed its faith and practice as "deeply and fundamentally catholic". It is closely related to the concept of Evangelical Catholicism, which emphasizes the catholicity of Lutheranism.

== Background ==
The English terms high church and low church were historically applied to particular liturgical and theological groups within Anglicanism. The theological differences within Lutheranism have not been nearly so marked as those within the Anglican Communion; Lutherans have historically been unified in the doctrine expressed in the Book of Concord. However, quite early in Lutheranism, polarities began to develop owing to the influence of the Reformed tradition, leading to so-called "Crypto-Calvinism". The Pietistic Lutheran movement in the 17th century also moved parts of the Lutheran Church further in a direction that would be considered "low church". Pietism and rationalism led not only to the simplification or even elimination of certain ceremonial elements, such as the use of vestments, but also to less frequent celebration of the Eucharist, by the end of the era of Lutheran Orthodoxy. There has been very little iconoclasm in Lutheran churches and church buildings have often remained richly furnished (cf. Lutheran art). Some monasteries also continued as Lutheran after the Reformation. Loccum Abbey and Amelungsborn Abbey in Germany have the longest traditions as Lutheran monasteries.

In old church orders, however there was much variation which could now be described as "high church" or "low church". One example of the more Catholic ones is the Swedish Church Ordinance 1571. The Agenda of the church order of Margraviate of Brandenburg (1540) contained unusually rich provision for ceremonial usages. The legacy of Brandenburgian Lutheranism was later visible in Old Lutherans' resistance to compromise in the doctrine of Real Presence. Other church orders following closely to pre-Reformation rites and ceremonies were Palatinate-Neuburg (1543, retaining a eucharistic prayer) and Austria (1571, prepared by David Chytraeus).

William Augustus Mühlenberg, father of the Ritualist movement in the Episcopal Church in the United States of America, was originally Lutheran and came from a Lutheran family.

In Europe, after long influence of Pietism, theological rationalism, and finally, 19th century German Neo-Protestantism, a ground for 20th-century High Church or Evangelical Catholic Movement developed. The terms "High Church" (Evangelical Catholic) and "Low Church" (Confessing Evangelical) began to be used to describe differences within the Lutheran tradition. However, this terminology is not necessarily as characteristic for a Lutheran's identity as it often is for an Anglican.

Sometimes there is a distinction made between Nordic style Lutheranism and German style Lutheranism, with the latter being more influenced by pietism and the former having both retained and later also revived more of its pre-Reformation liturgy and practices and therefore being more high church. Examples of this are well-preserved church interiors, apostolic succession, and a clear episcopal structure. Although the name Nordic is used, it is actually mostly applicable to Sweden and Finland, and to a lesser extent, to Estonia and Latvia because those countries were part of the Swedish empire and were therefore the jurisdiction of the Church of Sweden. The other Nordic countries of Denmark, Norway, and Iceland were under the influence of Danish rule in which the German form is dominant.

== High church movements ==
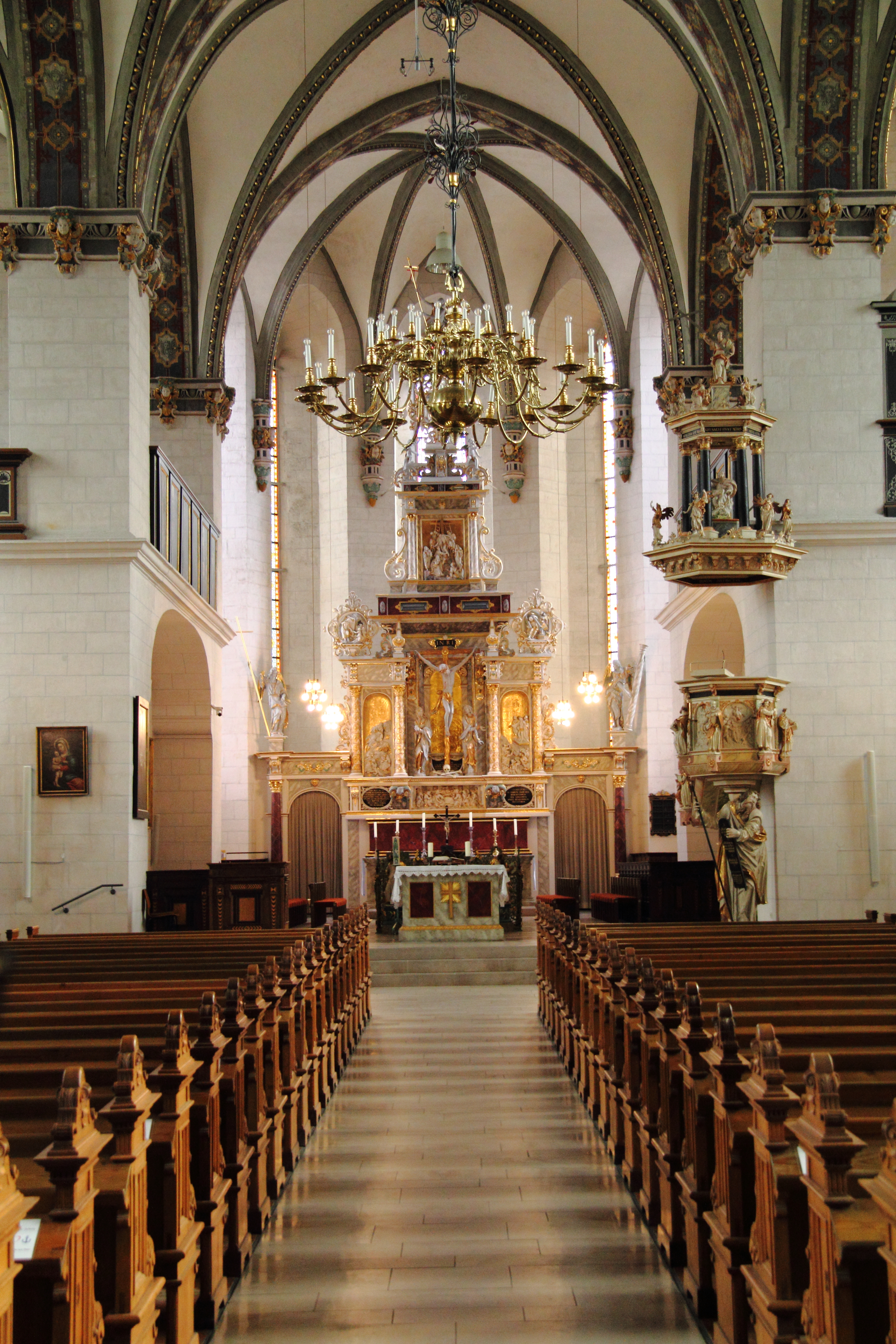
The nave and chancel of the Lutheran Church of the Blessed Virgin Mary in Wolfenbüttel, Germany

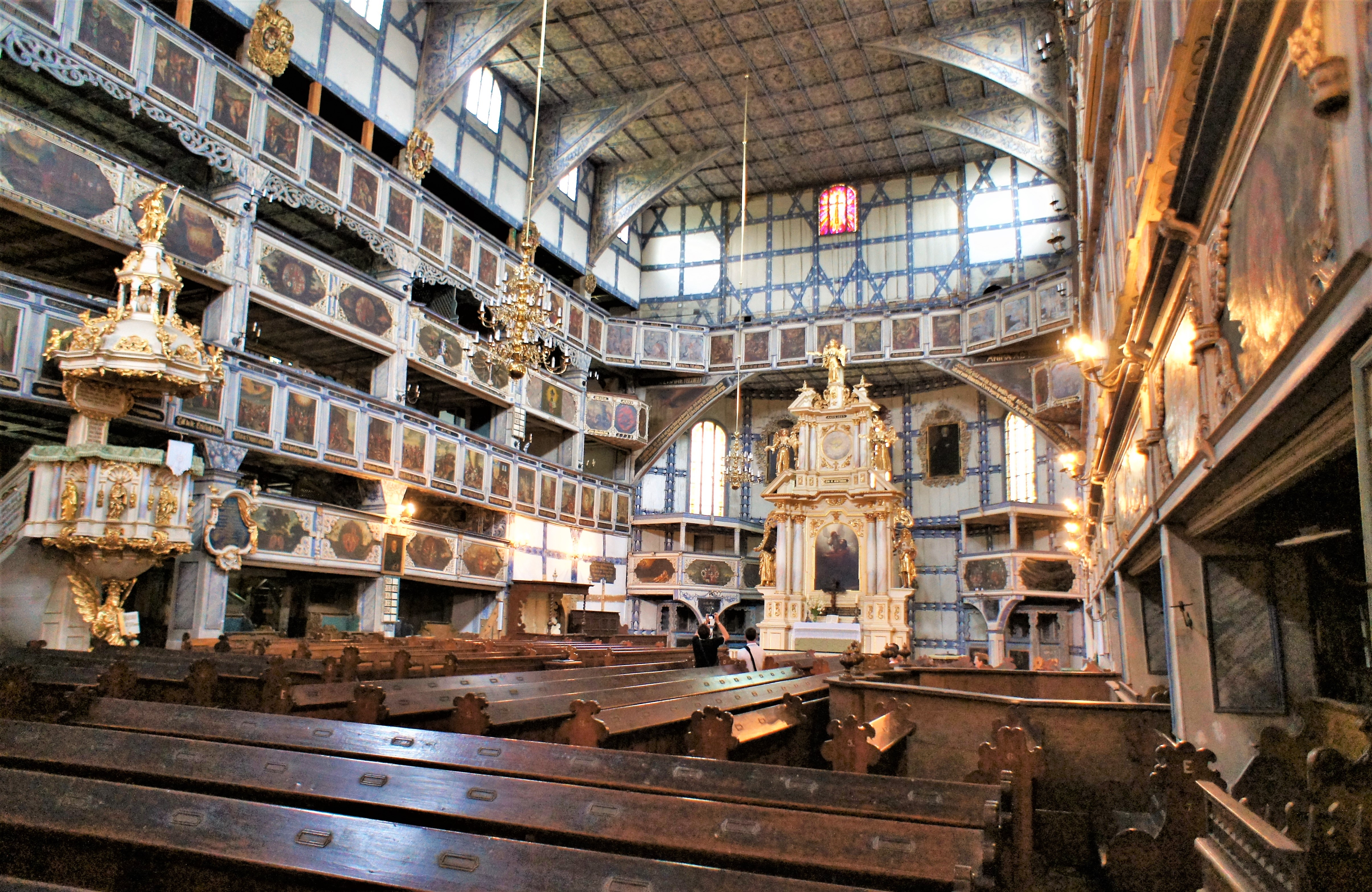
Elaborate interior of the Church of Peace in Jawor in Poland, part of the Evangelical Church of the Augsburg Confession in Poland

The roots of 20th-century Lutheran High Church movement are in 19th century neo-Lutheranism, confessional Lutheranism, Anglo-Catholicism, and the Liturgical Movement. High church Lutheranism has often been (especially in Scandinavian churches) a theologically orthodox revival movement at least among clergy, with a strong ecclesiology, standing in opposition to State church and "Folk church" ideologies, which parallel Erastianism within Anglican Church. The historic, elaborate liturgy and practice within Lutheranism itself was an inspiration for Anglo-Catholicism in the Church of England. The range within High Church movement varies across a spectrum from moderate to papalist. The Second Vatican Council led to a breakthrough for the High Church movement, which is slowly gaining support.

In Northern Europe, the term has been often used pejoratively, and was not necessarily ever used by pioneers of the movement, who identified themselves as Catholics of the Augsburg Confession. Nevertheless, the term "high church" has established itself at least in Sweden and Germany. Especially in North America, the term "high church" is avoided, because it is seen to not take seriously Lutheran confession and historical tradition as Evangelical Catholic. The term "high church" has also been criticized by theologians like Hermann Sasse (in German context) as not to integrate itself into authentic Lutheran tradition.

The Evangelical Catholic movement has been preserved by many confraternities, religious orders, and monastic communities within Lutheranism. It is growing in countries such as Norway.

High church movements have in some cases, especially in Northern Europe, fallen into crisis because of the issue of ordination of women. In Norway the issue has resulted in the establishment of the Evangelical Lutheran Diocese of Norway and the Nordic Catholic Church. In Germany, on the other hand, the primary issue has been the lack of historical episcopate and apostolic succession.

Nevertheless, the Evangelical Catholic movement has influenced whole church bodies, and in some cases has developed liberal expressions. The liturgical emphasis does not always indicate Catholic Lutheranism, because in the Lutheran Church, the Liturgical Movement apart from the Evangelical Catholic movement has been influential. Thus in Europe a certain amount of "high church" interest has been based on aesthetics, tastes in paraments, vestments, and ceremonies, without any theological argumentation or sense of historical continuity. Similarly, interest in mediaeval church buildings may have no concerns regarding the theology behind the form of worship taking place within these buildings.

=== Sweden ===
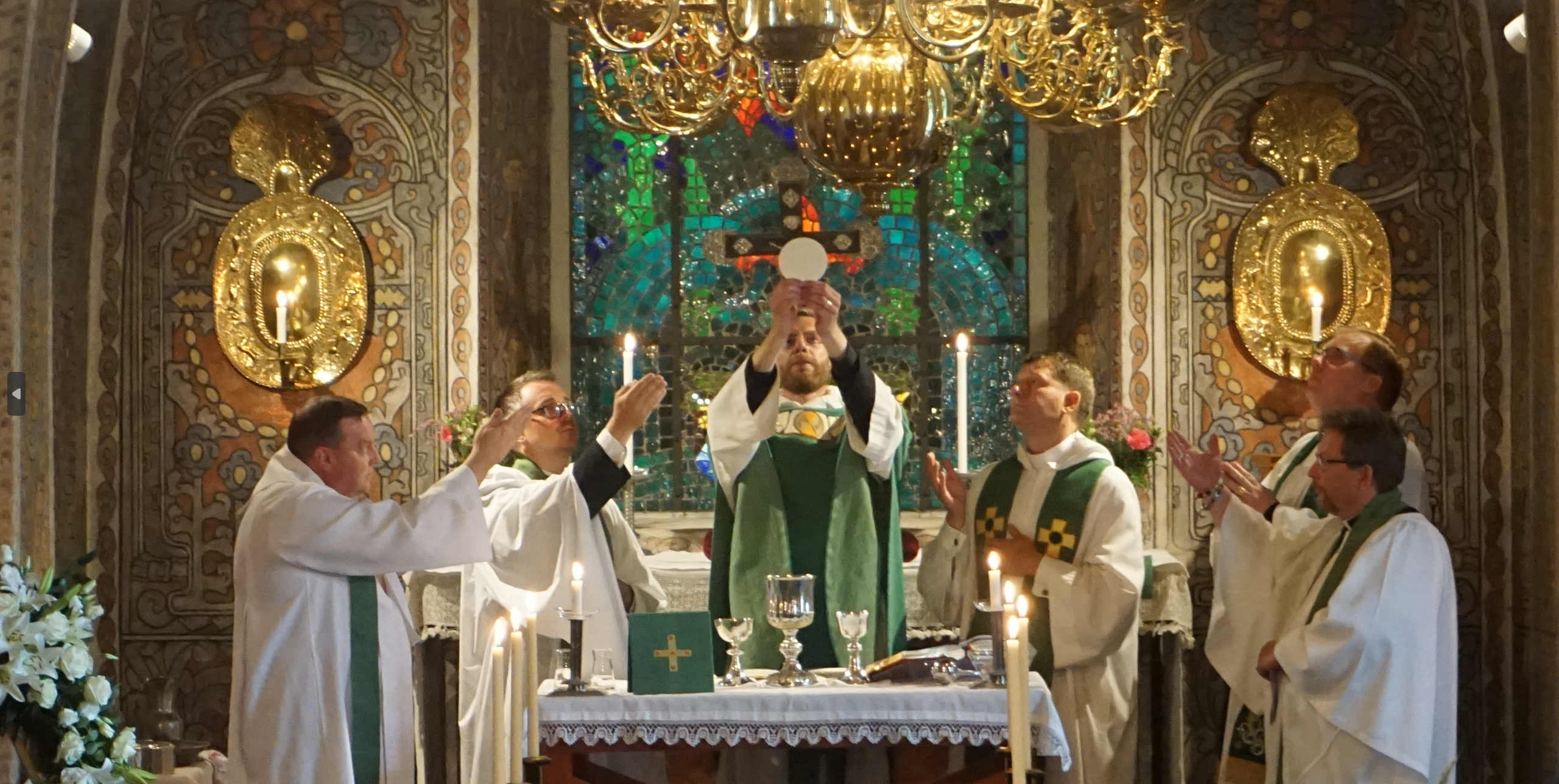
Lutheran priest elevating the host during the Mass at Alsike Church, Sweden

Historically Sweden, including the former Swedish province of Finland, has had a more elaborate form of liturgy, which preserved more links to the medieval Catholic tradition than other Nordic countries. Hence the most remarkable Lutheran high-church movement by its influence on the whole church body has been in the Church of Sweden, influenced at the end of the 19th and beginning of the 20th centuries by the Anglo-Catholic part of the Church of England (though Lutheranism had itself influenced the development of the Anglo-Catholic movement). The first religious order within the high church movement was the Societas Sanctae Birgittae, which still exists. The movement spread intensively through the activity of Gunnar Rosendal, the hymnwriter Olov Hartman, and the retreat director Jan Redin. The more subtle high church influence of Bishop Bo Giertz has been remarkable especially among Pietists. The early high church movement caused the emergence of retreat centres, more frequent celebration of the Mass, and lively historical-critical study of the Bible.

The movement in Lutheranism in Sweden sees the Eucharist as "the centre of Lutheran church-focused Christianity, because that is where the divine and the human realities interact."

The ordination of women as clergy began in 1958, and caused a split within the Swedish high church party. One branch with liberal leanings accepted this step while the other did not. Later, one of the leading figures of the high church movement was Bishop emeritus Bertil Gärtner who was against the ordination of women. He was successor to Bo Giertz as bishop of Gothenburg. He died in 2009. His role in the movement fell on Bishop emeritus Biörn Fjärstedt, the former bishop of Visby.

The Svensk Pastoraltidskrift is the traditionalist journal of the movement in Sweden. The nucleus of the movement is arbetsgemenskapen Kyrklig Förnyelse (Swedish Church Union) together with numerous religious societies and some Lutheran monastic communities like Östanbäck monastery, Alsike Convent, and Sisterhood of Saint Francis. Other organisations include the St. Laurence Foundation, the St. Ansgar Foundation, and Förbundet För Kristen Enhet, which works for the reunion of the Church of Sweden and the Roman Catholic Church. Additionally the Anglican Confraternity of the Blessed Sacrament is active within the Church of Sweden, with a national cell dependent upon the English jurisdiction of the confraternity.

=== Germany ===
The Berlin Cathedral

In Germany, the movement is much smaller than in Sweden. Because of several unions between Lutheran and Reformed churches since the Prussian Union, resulting in the simple spread of Calvinist concepts from the Reformed Churches by "osmosis", Lutheranism has often taken on a Reformed context. The movement within the Evangelical Church in Germany has been much less influential than in Sweden and perhaps less integrated to the state Lutheran tradition. Still the movement is strongly involved in ecumenism and the Liturgical Movement.

The case is much different in the Independent Evangelical-Lutheran Church in Germany. This church is a confessional Lutheran church in full "pulpit and altar fellowship" (full communion) with the Lutheran Church – Missouri Synod. Because of the confessional Lutheran direction, there is a high church movement in that Church.

The German high church movement began in Reformation Jubilee 1917, inspired by publication of Stimuli et Clavi, 95 theses by Heinrich Hansen. This resulted in the founding of Hochkirchliche Vereinigung Augsburgischen Bekenntnisses (High Church Union of the Augsburg Confession) the following year. Subsequently, other high church associations and societies also arose, distinguished from other Lutheran bodies by restored apostolic succession (mostly through Hochkirchliche St. Johannes-Bruderschaft, which is part of the HVAB, along with the Evangelische Franziskaner-Tertiaren.

The Catholic movement gained new strength by the Sammlung movement by Hans Asmussen and Max Lackmann. Other associations are Bund für evangelisch-katholische Einheit (League for Evangelical-Catholic Unity), including St. Jakobus- Bruderschaft), Arbeitsgemeinschaft Kirchliche Erneuerung in der Evang.-Luth. Kirche in Bayern (Working Group for Church Revival in the Evangelical Lutheran Church in Bavaria), Humiliatenorden, St. Athanasius-Bruderschaft, Hochkirchlicher Apostolat St. Ansgar, Bekenntnisbruderschaft St. Peter und Paul, Kommunität St. Michael in Cottbus, Congregatio Canonicorum Sancti Augustini, and some religious communities like Priory of St. Wigbert.

Other organisations, such as Berneuchen Movement and Kirchliche Arbeit Alpirsbach are regarded as part of the Liturgical Movement, although the former is theologically high church and in co-operation with other associations and religious fraternities.

=== North America ===
The 19th-century Old Lutheran and also Neo-Lutheran (e.g. Charles Porterfield Krauth) influence in North America was strong. The missionary work of Wilhelm Loehe, from Neuendettelsau, Bavaria, Germany, did much to contribute to Lutheran liturgical renewal in Germany and beyond. Loehe's influence can be seen in the Lutheran migration to Australia and North America. In North America this was seen in the Lutheran Church – Missouri Synod and the Iowa Synod.

The Evangelical Catholic movement was born later than the European movement. Its forerunners include Arthur Carl Piepkorn, Berthold Von Schenk, and Fr. Arthur Kreinheder. Portions of the Evangelical Lutheran Church in America and the Evangelical Lutheran Church in Canada have evangelical catholic emphases. Evangelical catholic congregations range from theologically liberal to conservative. The Society of the Holy Trinity is the largest evangelical catholic religious society in North America. Theologically, it is moderate and relatively conservative in ecumenical openness. The most ornate liturgy is to be found in the congregations of Evangelical Catholic Lutheran churches such as the Lutheran Church - International (LC-I), many parishes of the Lutheran Church – Missouri Synod, and in many Lutheran seminaries of all Lutheran varieties across North America which celebrate Solemn High Mass with ceremony similar to that found in traditional Roman Catholic and Anglo-Catholic parishes. The Society of Saint Polycarp, a devotional guild, was also founded within the LCMS. The most important evangelical catholic journals are Lutheran Forum, published by American Lutheran Publicity Bureau (ALPB), and Pro Ecclesia, published by the Center for Catholic and Evangelical Theology in cooperation with the ALPB.

Valparaiso University, an independent Lutheran institution, has also continued in its own evangelical catholic tradition. The development of this tradition is a unique blend between the movements within the various Lutheran church bodies. Students play a key role in crafting these services. Another significant contributor to the evangelical catholic values of Valparaiso University is the presence of the annual Liturgical Institute on its campus.

Like some previously mentioned German religious clerical fraternities, in the United States the LC-I and in recent years other small, biblically and theologically conservative high church evangelical catholic Lutheran churches such as The Lutheran Evangelical Protestant Church, Lutheran Orthodox Church, the Association of Independent Evangelical Lutheran Churches, the Evangelical Marian Catholic Church, and the Lutheran Episcopal Communion have succeeded in restoring the historic apostolic succession from Old Catholic churches. Additionally, some have moved from decentralized, democratic congregationalist polity to highly centralized episcopal polity; worship using the liturgies of the Roman Catholic Church exclusively; and work actively toward a form of visible, corporate reunion with the Roman Catholic Church.

In North America, Lutheran liturgical renewal has also been seen in such organizations as the defunct St. James Society, the journal The Bride of Christ, the journal Gottesdienst: The Journal of Lutheran Liturgy, the defunct journal Motley Magpie, the Society of the Holy Trinity, the Lutheran Liturgical Prayer Brotherhood (influenced by German Evangelisch-Lutherische Gebetsbruderschaft), the Lutheran Missal Project, the Society of Saint Polycarp, the Society for the Preservation of the Evangelical Lutheran Liturgy, and the Good Shepherd Institute at Concordia Theological Seminary in Fort Wayne, Indiana.

=== Other countries ===
The Church of Norway is generally pietistic. The Pietism movement in Norway (embodied to a great extent by the Haugean movement fostered by Hans Nielsen Hauge) has served to reduce the distance between lay and clergy in Norway. The high church movement is more isolated and much smaller than in Sweden. It has been promoted by Ordo Crucis, Bønne- og arbeidsfellesskapet Kirkelig Fornyelse, Pro Ecclesia, and Samråd på Kirkens Grunn.

In the Church of Denmark the high church movement is marginal. It is promoted by Fællesskabet Kirkelig Fornyelse. Praying of the Daily office has been promoted by Teologisk Oratorium (the best-known member having been Regin Prenter) and by Selskabet dansk Tidegærd.

The Church of Iceland and the Evangelical Lutheran Church of Finland have also had high church groups and interest has been expressed among both clergy and laity, though to a very small extent. After the Soviet era, in Baltic Lutheran churches, including archbishop Jānis Vanags, there has been interest to High Church Movement. In Estonian Evangelical Lutheran Church the movement is promoted by a confessional Society of the Augsburg Confession.

=== Academic theology ===
Through ecumenism, evangelical catholic ideas have been accepted more widely in academic theology, e.g. recent ecumenical Lutheran research in the Finnish School of Tuomo Mannermaa has begun to see Martin Luther as a Catholic teacher. This school of thought includes also Carl Braaten and Robert Jenson. Roman Catholic view of Luther in research has changed to positive since Joseph Lortz. In 1976 Joseph Ratzinger (later Pope Benedict XVI) suggested that the Augsburg Confession might possibly be recognized as a Catholic statement of faith. This however did not happen. Within evangelical catholic Lutheranism, there has been less movement towards Roman Catholicism than within Anglo-Catholicism. Owing to liberalism in Lutheran churches, some well known Lutheran theologians, such as Richard John Neuhaus and Reinhard Hütter, have become Roman Catholic while others, such as Jaroslav Pelikan, have joined the Eastern Orthodox Church.

== Theology and spirituality ==
The aim of the Evangelical Catholics is to recover the liturgical and confessional heritage of Lutheranism in continuity with the broad tradition that includes Anglicans, Roman Catholics, and the Eastern Orthodox. The movement stresses certain elements of the early Church: dogma, sacraments, hierarchy and ordained ministry, liturgy and continuity of the Church, all of which are traditional Lutheran theology, but were thought to have been neglected because of Pietism and the Age of Enlightenment. There is also emphasis on Catholic concept of priesthood and apostolic succession, ecumenism and Mariology. The Catholic concept of priesthood and continuity of the Church sets the movement apart from mainline Lutheranism and the ecumenical openness for some extent distincts the movement from Confessional Lutheranism, though certain Confessional Lutheran denominations, such as the Lutheran Church - International, are committed to an Evangelical Catholic churchmanship. The approach to worship may also significantly vary within Confessional Lutheranism.

By theological emphasis the movement may vary from one country to another. The classical manifesto of the Scandinavian high church revival program is "Kyrklig förnyelse" by Gunnar Rosendal (1935). In its beginning the German high church movement was inspired by the 95 theses "Stimuli et Clavi" by pastor Heinrich Hansen (1917).

In the same way as Anglo-Catholics have esteemed Caroline Divines, the Catholic Lutherans, owing to the nature of the Lutheran Reformation, have been able to appreciate many, largely forgotten, Catholic teachings of Reformers like Martin Luther, Laurentius Petri, Mikael Agricola, George of Anhalt, Martin Chemnitz, Gnesio-Lutherans, Gerhard's Confessio Catholica etc. According to formerly Roman Catholic Friedrich Heiler, the Lutheran Church is the proper via media between Roman Catholicism and Protestantism because of its emphasis upon doctrine and because it has preserved the Catholic doctrine of the sacrament and its liturgical traditions in purer form than the Anglican Church in the Book of Common Prayer.

Evangelical Catholic spirituality is characteristically more theocentric and christocentric than that of Pietist, rationalistic, and Liberal Protestant Lutheranism. In addition to the Theology of the Cross there is usually emphasis on Christus Victor, which makes it clear that Easter is more important than Good Friday. Theocentricism makes salvation history and the cycle of the church year important, from point of view of the incarnation.

These stresses have created the need to give an evangelical interpretation to the sacrifice of the Mass in order to provide a more theocentric view to Real presence. E.g. in Sweden there has been discovering of Laurentius Petri's theology on the sacrifice of the Mass. According to Wilhelm Loehe, "the whole of Lutheranism is contained in the Sacrament of the Altar. Here all of the chief doctrines of Christianity, especially those highlighted by the Reformation, have their focal point." In evangelical catholic spirituality the Mass is thus considered the heart of Christianity as it encapsulates the one, but eternally efficacious, sacrifice of Christ on Calvary.

One divide within the movement is in the matter of the direction of the liturgy. Some follow the understanding of liturgy as "work of the people" whereas others follow the understanding of the Apology of the Augsburg Confession, Article XXIV which states that the Mass can "be understood as a daily sacrifice, provided this means the whole Mass, the ceremony and also the proclamation of the Gospel, faith, prayer, and thanksgiving." A common hallmark of this divergence is the preference of the term "Divine Service" for the liturgy of Holy Communion (from Gottesdienst, Gudstjaenst, Jumalanpalvelus) among those who see the liturgy as chiefly the service of Christ for the Church. This divergence in liturgical theology is also manifested in debates on the eucharistic prayers, the epiclesis, and the role of the laity in the liturgy.

The praying of the Divine office is also characteristic to the movement's spirituality (with breviaries such as The Brotherhood Prayer Book and For All the Saints: A Prayer Book for and by the Church being used to pray the canonical hours). Confession as a sacrament is part of Lutheran tradition and is not considered unique to "high church". A small number of evangelical catholic congregations reaffirm Melanchthon's wider use of the word "sacrament" (in the Apology and in Loci Communes) by considering Holy Matrimony, Unction, Confirmation, and Holy Orders to be Sacraments.

=== Liturgical practices ===
Formal liturgy based on the western Catholic Mass with varying degrees of chanting, the use of organ music, crucifixes, silver chalices, hosts and the use of vestments for Holy Communion has always been characteristic of Lutheran worship. The use of hosts has been an important way to express belief in Real presence. The return of the weekly Mass, sign of the cross, eucharistic prayer and regular use of vestments in all churches are results of the liturgical movement, but things like altar servers, Gospel processions, incense, aspersions, a complete eucharistic prayer (i.e. including the epiclesis rather than merely Christ's Words of Institution) are regarded as "high church". Also genuflection, together with the elevation of the host and chalice, is often regarded among more Protestant-minded Lutherans as Roman Catholic practices, although Martin Luther himself held these practices and they were part of early Lutheranism. In Lutheran churches the use of altar bells during the elevation (to draw the attention of the congregation during the Words of Institution) was occasionally practiced until the 18th century. Adoration of the Blessed Sacrament during the moment of Elevation is also a Lutheran practice. However, except in special occasions of Swedish high church societies and among the most high-church of the North American Lutheran churches like the Anglo-Lutheran Catholic Church, Benediction of the Blessed Sacrament is seldom practised, even in high church circles. Unlike in Anglican Church, use of "fiddleback" chasubles are not seen as an adherence to Roman Catholic practice, because they were traditionally used in Lutheran churches in Germany until the Enlightenment and in Nordic countries until the Liturgical movement. Today they are more rare and are not necessarily favoured by clergy in Nordic countries because of the associations with the former era of liturgical decline.

== Notable persons ==
Sweden

- Bo Giertz
- Bertil Gärtner
- Albert Lysander (priest)
- Gunnar Rosendal
- Eric Segelberg
- Nathan Söderblom
- Yngve Brilioth
- Yngve Kalin

Germany

- Heinrich Hansen
- Friedrich Heiler
- Helmut Echternach

North America

- Frank Senn
- Robert W. Jenson
- Carl Braaten
- Irl A. Gladfelter

== See also ==
- Laurentius Petri Gothus
- Toivo Harjunpää
- Gabriel Hebert
- Crypto-papism
