= Yngve Kalin =

Swedish priest

Yngve Kalin (born May 2, 1950, in Växjö, Sweden) is a Swedish priest in Hyssna and one of the leaders of the traditionalist movement in the Church of Sweden.

Kalin is the author of the so-called Priest's Declaration of 2005 which renounces the decision by the Church Assembly to introduce an official order of blessing for registered partnerships. The Declaration, which was signed by 865 Swedish priests, states:

We . . . consider this decision to be contrary to that order of cohabitation and marriage which God, through his Word, has revealed to us, and which is defined as a relationship between a man and a woman. The Word of God does not permit us to bless any other type of relationship as a couple.

The Priest's Declaration was controversial.

Kalin was the chairman of the Church Coalition for the Bible and Confession between´2003 and 2022, a national organization that is similar to Anglican Forward in Faith and that was formed in 1958 by Bishop Bo Giertz, and he was the Editor in Charge of Svensk Pastoraltidskrift between 2005 and 2009, a by-weekly High Church journal containing ecclesiopolitical comments, Bible analysis for sermons and other information relating to the Church of Sweden. After the great tsunami of 2004 in Thailand, Kalin was one of the priests who was sent there to assist the many Swedish tourists who were among the victims, and he served as a coordinator for the work of the Church of Sweden in the region in the second week after the catastrophe.

After his ordination in Växjö 1973, up to 1980 Kalin served the congregation in Femsjö. Kalin moved to Swaziland in Southern Africa, whereto he was seconded by the Evangelical Lutheran Church in Southern Africa at which he worked from 1981 to 1990. Kalin has written two books about his African experiences, and maintained scrapbooks on the struggles for African liberation. From 1990 to 2002, Kalin lived in Mjöbäck, where he served as a parish pastor while he also was the chairman of the Technical Service Committee of the local council in Svenljunga. Between 1998 and 2006, Kalin was a lay judge at the Magistrates Court in Borås.

From 1996 to 2001, Kalin was a member of the Church Assembly (General Synod) of the Church of Sweden and from 1981 to 1998, he was a member of the Board of Church of Sweden Mission. For a part of this period he was also vice chairman of the Church of Sweden's administrative committee, as well as a member of several of the Boards of the Church's companies.

== Bibliography ==
- En missionärs dagbok
- Missionssituationer
