= Congregation of the Servants of Christ =

Congregation of the Servants of Christ can refer to:

- The Congregation of the Servants of Christ at Saint Augustine's House
- Congregation of the Servants of Christ (Pleshey)
