= Humiliatenorden =

Religious order

Evangelische Humiliatenorden ("Evangelical Order of Humiliati") is a German High Church Lutheran religious order that was founded in 1921.

The foundation of the Humiliatenorden was inspired by Friedrich Heiler. It is similar to a third order with temporal vows. The order is Lutheran in its accentuation of sola gratia, but it is claimed to be Catholic in its position on the sacraments and the Church. In 1946, under the direction of Abbot Richard Walter, the order was "placed completely in the services of the Una Sancta idea", working for Lutheran-Catholic ecumenism.
