= Solemn vow =

Type of promise made to God in liturgical forms of Christianity

A solemn vow is a certain vow ("a deliberate and free promise made to God about a possible and better good") taken by an individual after completion of the novitiate in a religious order. It is solemn insofar as the Church recognizes it as such, and is unique in that no human authority within the church can relieve a person from it.

== Distinction from simple vows ==
Any vow in Catholic religious life other than a solemn vow is a simple vow. Even a vow accepted by a legitimate superior in the name of the Church (the definition of a "public vow") is a simple vow if the Church has not granted it recognition as a solemn vow. In canon law a vow is public (concerning the Church itself directly) only if a legitimate superior accepts it in the name of the Church; all other vows, no matter how much publicity is given to them, are classified as private vows (concerning directly only those who make them). The vow taken at profession as a member of any religious institute is a public vow, but in recent centuries can be either solemn or simple.

There is disagreement among theologians as to whether the distinction between solemn and simple vows is primarily a matter of ecclesiastical administration or theological in nature; the latter position follows the opinion of Thomas Aquinas, holding that a solemn vow is, regardless of its approbation by the Church, a more strict, perfect and complete consecration to God.

Aquinas held that the only vows that could be considered solemn were those made by receiving the holy orders as a member of the Catholic Hierarchy, or by the religious profession of the rule as a member of a Catholic religious order.

As a unique exception to this traditional dichotomy, the Benedictine abbots could be consecrated bishops by an analogue apostolic authority (like another bishop, an archbishop, or the pope). This practice was contemplated by the canonical law since the Middle Age, as it is testified by the later life of Peter Cellensis. Since the 18th century, consecrators and episcopal lineage were extended to the Benedictine monks-bishops.

Aquinas, in support of his view, cited the fact that these two vows alone were considered to make the celebration of marriage invalid. He argued that a man who promised, either to a human being or to God (thus making a vow), to marry a certain woman was bound by that promise or vow, but if he broke it and married a different woman, the subsequent marriage was nonetheless considered valid. Similarly, if he made a vow to enter a particular religious institute or become a priest, but instead entered a different institute or decided to marry, the religious profession or the marriage, despite being a violation of his vow, was still considered valid. Once he had received holy orders or made a religious profession, however, any marriage he contracted was considered null and void.

Solemn vows were originally considered indissoluble. Not even the Pope could dispense from them. If for a just cause a religious was expelled, the vow of celibacy remained unchanged and so rendered invalid any attempt at marriage, the vow of obedience obliged in relation, generally, to the bishop rather than to the religious superior, and the vow of poverty was modified to meet the new situation but the expelled religious "could not, for example, will any goods to another; and goods which came to him reverted at his death to his institute or to the Holy See".

== Vows in religious institutes ==
In medieval times religious vows taken by members of religious institutes approved by the Holy See were regarded both as solemn and public. This was declared by Pope Boniface VIII (1235–1303).

The situation changed in the 16th century. In 1521, two years after the Fifth Lateran Council had forbidden the establishment of new religious institutes, Pope Leo X appointed a rule with simple vows for those tertiaries attached to existing institutes who undertook to live in a community. In 1566 and 1568, Pope Pius V rejected this class of institute, but they continued to exist and even increased in number. After at first being merely tolerated, they afterwards obtained approval. Only on almost the last day of the 19th century were they officially reckoned as religious, when Pope Leo XIII recognized as religious all men and women who took simple vows in such congregations.

A special case applied to the Jesuits. In the 16th century, Ignatius of Loyola obtained authorization for the members of the Society of Jesus to be divided into the professed with solemn vows and the coadjutors with dispensable simple vows. Nevertheless, before Pope Leo XIII's reforms in the 19th century, these simple vows constituted them religious in the true and proper sense of the word, with the consequent privileges and exemption of regulars, including the vows being a diriment impediment to matrimony, etc. In theory, the recognition as religious for simple vows had universal validity, but in practice, the Roman Curia considered it an exclusive privilege to the Society of Jesus.

== Practice by Christian denomination ==
=== Catholicism ===
==== Codes of Canon Law on religious institutes ====
On the basis of the distinction between solemn and simple vows, the 1917 Code of Canon Law made several other distinctions in relation to religious institutes, which it defined as legitimately established associations in accordance with which the members make public vows, either perpetual vows or temporary ones that are to be renewed periodically. It reserved the name "religious order" for institutes in which the vows were solemn, and used the term "religious congregation" for those with simple vows. The members of a religious order for men were called "regulars", those belonging to a religious congregation were simply "religious", a term that applied also to regulars. For women, those with simple vows were simply "sisters", with the term "nun" reserved in canon law for those who belonged to an institute of solemn vows, even if in some localities they were allowed to take simple vows instead.

However, the 1917 Code abolished the distinction according to which solemn vows, unlike simple vows, were indissoluble. It recognized no totally indispensable religious vows and thereby abrogated for the Latin Church the special consecration that distinguished "orders" from "congregations", while keeping some juridical distinctions.

A juridical distinction that the 1917 Code maintained was its declaring invalid any marriage attempted by solemnly professed religious or by those with simple vows to which the Holy See had attached the effect of invalidating marriage, while stating that no simple vow rendered a marriage invalid, except in the cases in which the Holy See directed otherwise. Thus solemnly professed religious were barred absolutely from marriage, and any marriage they attempted was invalid. Those who made simple vows were obliged not to marry, but if they did break their vow, the marriage was considered valid but illicit.

Another difference was that a professed religious of solemn vows lost the right to own property and the capacity to acquire temporal goods for himself or herself, but a professed religious of simple vows, while being prohibited by the vow of poverty from using and administering property, kept ownership and the right to acquire more, unless the constitutions of the religious institute explicitly stated the contrary.

These were two of the nine juridical consequences (apart from spiritual effects) of the difference between solemn and simple vows.

After publication of the 1917 Code, many institutes with simple vows appealed to the Holy See for permission to make solemn vows. The Apostolic Constitution Sponsa Christi of 21 November 1950 made access to that permission easier for nuns (in the strict sense), though not for religious institutes dedicated to apostolic activity. Many of these institutes of women then petitioned for the solemn vow of poverty alone. Towards the end of the Second Vatican Council, superiors general of clerical institutes and abbots president of monastic congregations were authorized to permit, for a just cause, their subjects of simple vows who made a reasonable request to renounce their property except for what would be required for their sustenance if they were to depart.

The 1983 Code of Canon Law maintains the distinction between solemn and simple vows, but no longer makes any distinction between their juridical effects. For instance, while under the 1917 Code solemn vows rendered a subsequent marriage invalid, but simple vows only made the marriage illicit, the current Code of Canon Law states that "those bound by a public perpetual vow of chastity in a religious institute invalidly attempt marriage".

Renunciation of the right to own property is now a matter for the constitutions of the religious institute in question and is associated not with the solemnity of the vows but with their perpetuity. The 1983 Code states:

A person who must renounce fully his or her goods due to the nature of the institute is to make that renunciation before perpetual profession in a form valid, as far as possible, even in civil law; it is to take effect from the day of profession. A perpetually professed religious who wishes to renounce his or her goods either partially or totally according to the norm of proper law and with the permission of the supreme moderator is to do the same. A professed religious who has renounced his or her goods fully due to the nature of the institute loses the capacity of acquiring and possessing and therefore invalidly places acts contrary to the vow of poverty. Moreover, whatever accrues to the professed after renunciation belongs to the institute according to the norm of proper law.

=== Evangelical Lutheranism ===
Evangelical-Lutheran religious orders, such Daughters of Mary (sisters who have a devotion to the Blessed Virgin Mary), and The Congregation of the Servants of Christ (monks who follow the Rule of Saint Benedict), take solemn vows of poverty, chastity, and obedience.

Outside of those in a state of consecrated life, in Evangelical Lutheranism, marriage vows are a form of solemn vows that a husband and wife make to one another.
