= Ordo Crucis =

Ordo Crucis (The Order of the Cross) is a High Church Lutheran religious society for men and women, clergy and laity, in the Church of Norway. The Order was founded in 1933 by professor Hans Ording, parish priest Odd Godal and Alex Johnson, later Bishop of Hamar. The Order desires to renew the Church from within. Brethren also work to reintroduce private confession, and to celebrate the Eucharist with more Catholic content. Brethren follow the Rule of Life of the Order. Ordo Crucis has local groups in Trondheim, Bergen, Kristiansand, Skien, and Oslo. In Oslo, the Order celebrates Mass every Saturday in Frogner Chapel.

Members include Torgeir Havgar, Egil A. Wyller and Inge Lønning. Several Roman Catholic priests have also sought to join the Order. Members in the episcopate have included Alex Johnson, Kaare Støylen, Tord Godal, Per Lønning, Sigurd Oseberg, and Fredrik Grønningsæter.

== Literature ==
- Ordo Crucis 1933-2003. Om ordenens opprinnelse, målsetting og påvirkninger i kirke og samfunn by Ove Hestvold. Kirke og Kultur, Årgang 2003, Nr 04 (pages 365-374)
