= The Hammer of God (Bo Giertz novel) =

1941 novel by Bo Giertz

First English-language edition (publ. Augsburg Fortress, 1960)

The Hammer of God: A Novel about the Cure of Souls by Bo Giertz was first published in 1941 in Swedish as Stengrunden ("The Stone Foundation"). It has been translated into English in 1960, 1973 and 2005. The English-language title derives from the first part of the book, Herrens hammare ("The Hammer of the Lord").

It was filmed in 2007 and is available with Swedish and English subtitles.

== Literature ==
- The Hammer of God: A Novel about the Cure of Souls. Translated by Clifford Ansgar Nelson. Minneapolis: Augsburg Publishing, 2005. ISBN 0-8066-5130-X. Revised edition.
