= The Church Union =

Anglo-Catholic advocacy group

The Church Union is an Anglo-Catholic advocacy group within the Church of England.

== History ==
The organisation was founded as the Church of England Protection Society on 12 May 1859 to challenge the authority of the English civil courts to determine questions of doctrine. It changed its name to the English Church Union in May 1860.

In particular, it was active in defending Anglo-Catholic priests such as Arthur Tooth, Sidney Faithorn Green and Richard William Enraght against legal action brought under the Public Worship Regulation Act 1874. The passage of this law was secured by Archbishop of Canterbury Archibald Campbell Tait to restrict the growing Oxford Movement and had the support of then-Prime Minister Benjamin Disraeli.

One of the most famous attempts at prosecution under the 1874 act began in 1888. It was aimed against the Bishop of Lincoln Edward King, but the Archbishop of Canterbury Edward Benson revived his own archiepiscopal court (inactive since 1699) to avoid the prosecution of the saintly King in a lay court.

Such prosecutions ended in 1906 after a Royal Commission recognized pluralism in worship, but the act was not repealed until the Ecclesiastical Jurisdiction Measure 1963. In 1933, the English Church Union merged with the Anglo-Catholic Congress to form the present organisation. The Church Union publishes a magazine called the Church Observer.

== See also ==
- Catholic Societies of the Church of England
- American Church Union
- Swedish Church Union
