= Hochkirchlicher Apostolat St. Ansgar =

Society of the German Lutheran High Church

Hochkirchlicher Apostolat St. Ansgar (HAStA) (High Church Apostolate St. Ansgar) is one of the smaller German Lutheran High Church societies.

The background of the Apostolate St Ansgar was in late 1960s. At that time the understanding of the ordained ministry and Eucharist in general were in decline in the Evangelical Church in Germany, and ordinations without laying on of hands and strange communion services were held. In this situation a trade school pastor Karl August Hahne from Gelsenkirchen decided to found a religious brotherhood, which could retain among other things also the right understanding of the office and the Eucharist within it. Hahne was re-ordained in August 1971 by Bishop Helmut Echternach from St. Athanasius-Bruderschaft and consecrated as auxiliary bishop for HAStA in apostolic succession on 11 December 1971 by Hans Heuer, bishop of Ordo Militiae Crucis Templi Jerusalem, with recommendation of Bishop Echternach.

In order to form the intended high church brotherhood, somewhat more loosely organized Apostolate St Ansgar was formed in the beginning on the way to a religious brotherhood. However, when Hahne died, the brotherhood had not established itself well enough to survive the founder's death and thus the group in Gelsenkirchen dispersed. Hahne's coadjutor, professor Helmut Tramnitz actively continued to lead the apostolate and its work in Detmold.

The apostolate has remained a small fellowship and loosely organised as a society. Theologically it is Lutheran and faithful to Bible. It has published several books by Karsten Bürgener. In celebration of Mass, HAStA uses its own missal, "Die St.Ansgar-Messe".

From the activity of HAStA has even born “Kommunität St. Michael”, a small High Church community in Cottbus.

== Apostolic succession ==
Apostolic succession in HAStA is as follows:

- Gerard Gul
- Arnold Harris Mathew,
- de Landas Berghes,
- Carmel Henry Carfora,
- Georg F. Davis,
- Hans Heuer,
- KARL AUGUST HAHNE
- Helmut Paulus Tramnitz.
- Karsten Reinhard Bürgener
- Matthias Niche
