= Lutheran Church - International =

- Classification: Lutheran
- Orientation: Evangelical Catholic; Confessional Lutheran
- Polity: Episcopal
- Founder: Edward Tornow
- Origin: 1967; North Dakota
- Congregations: 15
- Members: 1000
- Other name(s): International Lutheran Fellowship (1967–2011)
- Official website: www.lutheranchurchinternational.org

The Lutheran Church - International (LC-I) is a confessional Lutheran Christian denomination of Evangelical Catholic churchmanship. Founded in 1967, it is based in Lyons, New York with a global presence. The LC-I has an episcopal polity, with four dioceses in North America, including the Northeastern Diocese, the Mid-America Diocese, the Southern Diocese, and the Western Diocese. A Missionary District for Latin and Caribbean ministries is based in Puerto Rico. The LC-I also has ministry outreach in India. The current archbishop of the LC-I is Robert W. Hotes.

== Background ==
The Church's president from 1967 to 1998 was Pastor E. Edward Tornow of North Dakota. From 1967 to 2011 the LC-I was known as the International Lutheran Fellowship.

The Lutheran Church-International describes itself as "Confessional", "Orthodox", "Ecumenical (within the understandings based on the Book of Concord)", and "Evangelical". Confessionally, it adheres to the "Gospel of Jesus Christ as faithfully witnessed by the Augsburg Confession of 1530, and the Book of Concord". As an orthodox Christian body, "the LC-I maintains a traditional, faithful understanding of Lutheranism within the church catholic". Further, the LC-I has stated that it will "work with faithful Christians globally", and "internally with those church bodies with whom theological cooperation is possible". Finally, the LC-I sees itself as "a church of the Great Commission", seeking to "make disciples of all nations".

== Threefold ministry ==
The Lutheran Church–International has an Evangelical Catholic churchmanship and teaches that its clergy are ordained in lines of apostolic succession. The Lutheran Church–International has a threefold ministry of bishops, priests, and deacons. As with other Confessional Lutheran bodies, the Lutheran Church - International ordains men as priests and bishops, though both men and women may serve as deacons.

The Lutheran World Parish is a unique ministry within the LC-I. A current LC-I brochure states that the Lutheran World Parish consists of "Individuals desiring to affiliate with the LC-I, but who are not near (a)...congregation".

== Religious orders ==
The Lutheran Church - International is associated with the Congregation of the Servants of Christ at St. Augustine’s House, a Lutheran monastery in Oakland County, Michigan. It was founded in 1958 by Arthur Carl Kreinheder, who was ordained in the Church of Sweden.

Established in 2006, the Order of St. Francis-Lutheran (OSF-L) is another ministry of the Lutheran Church-International. The Order is based in St. Catharines, Ontario, Canada and is headed by the Rev. Larry J. Goodnough. Goodnough was commissioned as the OSF-L Superior by Bishop Bougher of the LC-I Northeastern Diocese. The Rev. William Babbitt of Florida serves as U.S. Superior. The OSF-L is a ministry of lay persons and clergy in the spirit of Francis of Assisi, not a religious order.

== Synods (from 2011) ==
2011 – The Mundelein Synod; July 27–30, 2011; University of St. Mary’s of the Lake Conference Center, Mundelein, Illinois

2012 – The Lyons Synod; (Date, July 2012); First Lutheran Church, Lyons, New York
