= Bekenntnisbruderschaft St. Peter und Paul =

Bekenntnisbruderschaft St. Peter und Paul (BPP) (Confessing Brotherhood of SS Peter and Paul) is a German High Church Lutheran religious society.

Bekenntnisbruderschaft St. Peter und Paul was led by Peter Beyerhaus, professor emeritus of Tübingen University.

The Rule of the Brotherhood is published by Institute Diakrisis. It affirms all seven Catholic sacraments and apostolic succession.
