= Hochkirchliche Vereinigung Augsburgischen Bekenntnisses =

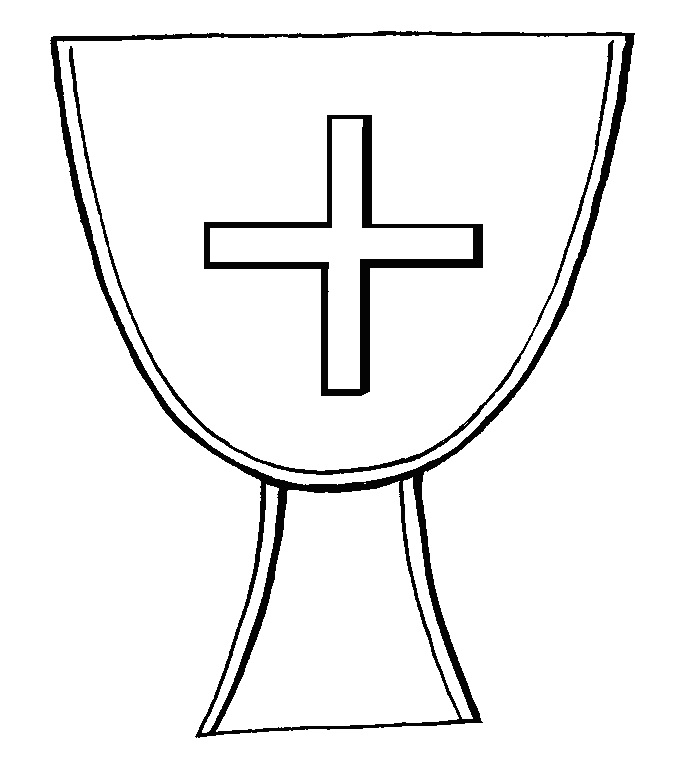
symbol of the Hochkirchliche Vereinigung

The Hochkirchliche Vereinigung Augsburgischen Bekenntnisses (High Church Union of the Augsburg Confession) is a Lutheran High Church organisation in Germany. It was founded in Berlin in October 1918, inspired by the High Church theses Stimuli et Clavi (1917) by Heinrich Hansen. Later it was greatly influenced by the Evangelical Catholic theology of professor Friedrich Heiler.

The Hochkirchliche Vereinigung seeks not only to restore, but also to carry through the full catholicity of the Augsburg Confession, which has coherently never happened in the history of the Lutheran Church. It has also been able to make many High Church practices legitimate in the Evangelical Church in Germany and has been involved in the Liturgical Movement.

The Hochkirchliche Vereinigung considers episcopal polity essential to the Church and seeks to restore apostolic succession through the Hochkirchliche St. Johannes-Bruderschaft. Within the Hochkirchliche Vereinigung there is also the Lutheran Franciscan third order (Evangelische Franziskaner-Tertiaren).
