= Societas Sanctae Birgittae =

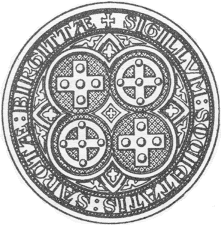
Seal of the Societas Sanctæ Birgittæ.

The praying of vespers, according to the Evangelical-Lutheran tradition, at Vadstena Abbey Church by members of the Societas Sanctae Birgittae

Bishops, priests and deacons, as well as laity, belonging to the Societas Sanctae Birgittae at Vadstena Abbey Church

Societas Sanctæ Birgittæ (SSB) is a High Church Evangelical-Lutheran religious society with character of third order for priests and laity, men and women in the Church of Sweden.

Societas Sanctæ Birgittæ was founded in 1920 as a refuge for those who in a time of liturgical and theological decline of the Church of Sweden in early 20th century longed for more ceremonial celebration of the Mass, sincere worship and scriptural preaching.

The initiative of the founding of SSB was made by archbishop Nathan Söderblom, for there was need to a religious society for both men and women. Söderblom introduced members of S:t Sigfrids Brödraskap (Brotherhood of St Sigfrid, SSB) – a High Church confraternity of Evangelical-Lutheran priests – to Count and Countess Eric and Mary von Rosen and others like them, who treasured the memory of St Birgitta of Sweden. Söderblom was not himself later involved.

Members of Societas Sanctæ Birgittæ, in reverence to Saint Birgitta of Sweden and following her example, want to serve the Holy Catholic and Apostolic Church in Sweden (that is the Church of Sweden). SSB has good relations to the Roman Catholic Bridgettine Order.

SSB tries to renew the Church from within by revival of the practice of Holy Communion and Prayer both by the individual members of the Church and in the parishes, by the preaching and teaching to the Church faithful the Word of God and the Creed of the Church, and by the increased use of private confession and pastoral care.

SSB holds its General Chapter, at Vadstena, every year during a week around the time of "the Heavenly Birthday" of Saint Birgitta (23 July). It is observed in Pontifical High Mass in the church of Vadstena Abbey. The General Chapter is one of the biggest annual events of the High Church Movement in Sweden. As a rule conventions are organized three times a year at different places in the country and sometimes abroad. SSB is also a prayer fellowship, in which Brothers and Sisters are remembered in the daily worship.

SSB is headed by one of its priests as Father Confessor and one of its Sisters as Mother Superior and it is under an episcopal Visitor. The Society also has its own chaplain and Novice Masters for both men and women. Although most members are members of the Church of Sweden, SSB also has members e.g. from Evangelical Lutheran Church of Finland, Church of Denmark, Church of England and churches in the USA. Today SSB has about 200 members.

== Confessors of SSB ==
- Hugo Berggren 1920 - 1944
- Simon Lüders 1945 - 1964
- Alf Corell 1965 - 1983
- Karl-Olof Berglund 1983 - 2001
- Bo Brander 2001 - 2026
- Markus Hagberg 2026–

== Mothers Superior of SSB ==
- Mary von Rosen 1920 - 1964
- Ingrid af Ekenstam 1964 - 1983
- Anna-Greta Roos 1983 - 1990
- Anna Greta Norén 1990 - 2014
- Anna Greek 2014 -

== Visitors of SSB ==
- The Right Reverend Gustaf Aulén 1935 - 1959 (Bishop of Strängnäs)
- The Right Reverend Olof Herrlin 1962 - 1972 (Bishop of Visby)
- The Right Reverend Bertil Gärtner 1972 - 2009 (Bishop of Gothenburg)

== Literature ==
- "Gör också våra kalla hjärtan brinnande." Societas Sanctæ Birgittæ 1920-2020. Ed. by Oloph Bexell, Gunilla Gren-Eklund, Fredrik Santell and Andreas Wejderstam. Skelleftea: Artos 2020, 550 pages. ISBN 978-91-7777-152-4.
- B.I. Kilstroem: "Societas Sanctae Birgittae and the renaissance of the remembrance of St Birgitta." Publ. in Spiritualität heute und gestern / Internationaler Kongress vom 4. bis 7. August 1982 [im Kloster Lilienfeld]. Bd 19:2. Salzburg : Inst. für Anglistik und Amerikanistik, Univ. Salzburg, 1993 (Analecta cartusiana 35:19), ISBN 3-7052-0923-X
