= Stimuli et Clavi =

Stimuli et clavi i. e. theses adversus huius temporis errores et abusus (German: Spieße und Nägel d.i. Streitsätze wider die Irrnisse und Wirrnisse unserer Zeit; English: Goads and Nails, that is, Theses Against Errors and Abuses of This Time) are 95 theses published by North German Lutheran pastor Heinrich Hansen at the Reformation jubilee of 1917.

The theses were published both in Latin and German and their number corresponds to the 95 Theses of Martin Luther. The title alludes to the Book of Ecclesiastes in the Old Testament: "The words of the wise are like goads, their collected sayings like firmly embedded nails — given by one Shepherd" (Ecclesiastes 12:11).

Stimuli et Clavi were the beginning of the so-called Evangelical Catholic or High Church Lutheran movement in Germany. They inspired the foundation of the Hochkirchliche Vereinigung Augsburgischen Bekenntnisses in the following year (1918).

== See also ==
- Claus Harms
