= St. Laurence Foundation =

Coordinates: 55°41′44″N 13°12′02″E

The St. Laurence Foundation (Laurentiistiftelsen) is an independent student hostel in Sweden for students at Lund University. The foundation belongs to the Catholic movement of the Church of Sweden. It was founded in 1938. Daily office is prayed and Mass celebrated in St. Laurence Church connected to the hostel.

When K. G. Hammar became Bishop of Lund in 1992, he did not want to be responsible for the episcopal oversight of St. Laurence Foundation. St. Laurence Foundation then sought episcopal oversight from bishop emeritus Bertil Gärtner and after his death from bishop emeritus Biörn Fjärstedt.

The current warden of the St. Laurence Foundation is Th.D. Carl-Johan Axskjöld.

Societas Sancti Laurentii is a confraternity founded in 1957 by students living in the St. Laurence Foundation.
