= Bo Giertz =

Swedish theologian

The Right Reverend Bo Giertz
- Bishop of Gothenburg
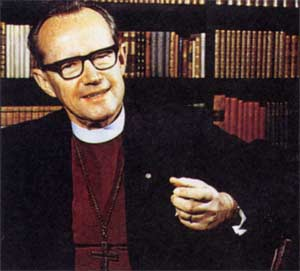
- Bishop Giertz in early 1950s
- Church: Church of Sweden
- Diocese: Diocese of Gothenburg
- In office: 1949–1970
- Predecessor: Carl Block
- Successor: Bertil Gärtner

Orders
- Ordination: 28 December 1934
- Consecration: 22 May 1949 by Erling Eidem

Personal details
- Born: Bo Harald Giertz; August 31, 1905 Räpplinge, Öland, Sweden
- Died: July 12, 1998 (aged 92) Djursholm, Uppland, Sweden
- Buried: Torpa, Östergötland, Sweden
- Denomination: Lutheran
- Parents: Knut Harald Giertz and Anna Ericsson
- Spouse: (1) Ingrid Andrén (2) Elisabeth Heurlin (3) Karin Lindén
- Children: Lars, Birgitta, Ingrid, Martin
- Occupation: theologian, writer
- Profession: clergy
- Education: Ba.Th.
- Alma mater: Uppsala University
- Motto: Verbum crucis Dei virtus
- Coat of arms

Bo Harald Giertz (Swedish: [ˈbuː ˈjæʈːʂ]; 31 August 1905 – 12 July 1998) was a Swedish Lutheran theologian, novelist and bishop of the Gothenburg Lutheran Diocese from 1949 to 1970. By the time he became bishop, he was already quite well known in Sweden and elsewhere both as an author and as a priest. He worked hard to promote western Swedish Pietism, an outlook that strongly resembled Neo-Lutheranism. Mostly it was a piety that took Scripture seriously, though not in a fundamentalist, literalist sense, and that centered Christian life on sacraments and prayer. Giertz's combination of pietist pastoral care with High Church Lutheran theology, which can also be noticed in his novels, gained for him a wide readership and made his novels as well as non-fiction books about Christian faith popular in Scandinavia. Giertz wrote more than 600 works but is known in the English-speaking world mostly for his book The Hammer of God.

== Biography ==
=== Childhood ===
Giertz was born in Räpplinge on Öland, an island off the east coast of Sweden. His father, Knut Harald Giertz, was a well-known doctor, the son of John Bernard and Augusta Giertz; for two years he taught surgery at Uppsala University. His mother, Anna Ericsson, was a daughter of Lars Magnus Ericsson, the founder of the Ericsson telephone company.

During his childhood his mother was agnostic and his father an atheist. Nevertheless, for the sake of tradition and custom, Giertz was baptized at 2 months of age shortly after his family moved to Uppsala. Giertz stated that his father eventually became Christian after attending the Sunday services that were obligatory in order for the teen-aged Bo and his siblings to be eligible for confirmation; although Giertz was now formally enrolled in the church, he remained an atheist, read widely from his father's library of atheist literature and argued with the priest in favour of evolutionary biology.

His parents took his early education seriously. Every summer his father would hire a governess from Germany or England, and they were to speak to the children only in German or English, respectively. In 1917, despite the fact that World War I was still continuing, the 12-year-old Giertz was sent to a language camp in Germany. For several years after his return he did summer work for his father, assisting at Knut Giertz's surgical clinic and documenting the proceedings in Latin for the clinic's logbook.

=== Higher education ===
In 1924 Giertz graduated from the Norra Latin senior secondary school for boys in the Norrmalm district of Stockholm. In the hope that Giertz would follow his father as a surgeon, Knut Giertz encouraged him to enrol in medicine at Uppsala University. Perceiving a conflict between his atheism and his latent moral sense, and concerned at the immoral behavior he had observed among some of his atheist peers, he became involved with a Christian student association. After attending some lectures by Natanael Beskow, a non-ordained pacifist preacher who led Förbundet för kristet samhällsliv ("the Swedish association for Christian social life"), Giertz became convinced of the existence of God and the historicity of Jesus. Changing his plans and course of study at Uppsala, Giertz quit studying medicine and took up theology instead. Though very unhappy about this, his father accepted Giertz's choice but declared that if he were to switch majors again he was not to expect further financial help.

=== Meeting the Queen Consort ===
During a semester abroad to study Etruscan archaeology in Italy with Axel Boëthius, an audience with Swedish Queen Consort Victoria left a deep impression upon him.

Born in Germany, the queen had moved to southern Italy, establishing a residence on the resort island of Capri, from where she would visit Sweden in the summers. The queen had met Knut Giertz when she had taken ill during a royal tour in Umeå; on that occasion the elder Giertz had accompanied the queen on the train back to Stockholm. They met again in 1927 as convalescents in Rome some time after Knut Giertz had himself developed a heart defect through having been infected by a patient he had been treating for streptococcus.

Having previously known of Bo Giertz through her connection with his father, the queen asked him during his audience if he desired to become a theology professor. According to Giertz, when he told her he only really wanted to be a priest, she made him promise to be a "true priest."

=== Theological study ===
Returning to his studies in Uppsala, Bo Giertz was mentored by New Testament exegetics professor Anton Fridrichsen; he later declared that all his books had been written in an endeavour to disseminate what Fridrichsen had taught him, ideas which he believed to be in marked contrast, for instance, to the efforts of German theologian Rudolf Bultmann to demythologize Christianity of accreted concepts of angels, demons, miracles, heaven and hell — all of which Bultmann considered as significant barriers to people's understanding and accepting the inner message of Jesus. Bultmann had visited Uppsala shortly after Fridrichsen and Giertz had returned from Palestine, a trip Bo's father had paid for, and which Giertz later described as part of the setting for his 1948 book Med egna ögon ("With My Own Eyes"). According to Giertz, Rudolf Bultmann treated Christianity as a philosophical system rather than a lived experience, and could not, therefore, appreciate Fridrichsen's explanation of how visiting Palestine and seeing people living and working much as they had during the earthly ministry of Jesus had deepened his understanding of scriptures and Christianity.

== Career ==
=== Churchman and priest ===
After completing seminary training, Giertz spent three years as a travelling consultant for the Lutheran church's high school student association. In those years from 1932 to 1935, during a time when Sweden was rapidly becoming more secular, he tried to visit every Swedish school to present Christian faith through lectures and debates. He spent considerable time away from home and wrote numerous articles, becoming embroiled in church politics.

Ordained in 1934, he served for a year as a vacancy priest for two congregations. As priest in Östra Husby parish, he was further influenced by the Pietism that had swept through that congregation 70 years earlier through the influence of revivalist author and preacher Carl Olof Rosenius. It is not as surprising as it might seem that Rosenius's influence was still felt; he had been a looming presence, for instance, in the household of artist David Wallin as he grew up in the same parish a generation earlier. Giertz, too, fell under his posthumous sway, to the extent that the Latin phrase Verbum crucis Dei virtus ("The message of the cross is the power of God", 1 Cor. 18) came to embody his work; it was later to be the motto he adopted as bishop.

During this time Giertz began to take seriously Schartauanism, a form of Pietism that had developed in western Sweden — teachings which had been greatly influenced by the works of Henric Schartau — and became inspired by Bokenäs vicar Gösta Nelson. By now he had come to feel that he was falling short of God's moral dictates; whereas he had previously thought forgiveness of sins grounded in faith alone to have been a "hopelessly naïve" position, he now came to embrace this doctrine of the western Pietists and to take solace in it.

Giertz was a pioneer on advocating regular celebration of Sunday Mass, something that was not usual in the Church of Sweden. He also exhorted ministers to follow his own practice of regular prayer according to the Divine office.

=== Author ===
Giertz's second vacancy pastorate was in Ekeby (Diocese of Linköping) in 1937. It was here that he wrote his first book Kristi kyrka (translated by Hans O. Andrae as Christ’s Church).

Giertz's first regularly assigned parish was in Torpa, where he served as assistant vicar from 1938 until his election as bishop in 1949. Here he authored many theological works including Kyrkofromhet ("Ecclesiastical piety", which was published with Kristi kyrka in 1939); Den stora lögnen och den stora sanningen ("The great lie and the great truth", 1945); Kampen om människan ("The Battle For Man", 1947); Stengrunden (“The Hammer of God”, 1941); and Tron allena (“Faith Alone”, 1943).

During much of his time in Torpa, the rest of Europe was enveloped in war. Though Sweden tried to maintain a neutral stance nationally, many men from his parish went, both during the 1939–40 Winter War and later in formal alliance with Germany during the so-called Continuation War to fight the Soviets in Finland. Prior to 1809 that country had belonged to Sweden, and it had then for 108 years been a vassal state of the Russian Empire as the Grand Duchy of Finland. Giertz supported the military campaign, sending money and materials and, after the Moscow Peace Treaty had ceded one-eleventh of Finland's territory to the Soviet Union, receiving Finnish refugees. During the latter part of Nazi Germany's occupation of Denmark his own home also became a safe house for members of the Danish resistance movement who were being hunted by the Nazis and had fled their country.

=== Family ===
Giertz's brother was architect Lars Magnus Giertz (1908-2008). In 1932 he married Ingrid Sofia Margareta Andrén (known as "Ninni", b. 1908), a daughter of conductor and organist Adolf Andrén (1869-1936) and Ellen Borg. In 1942 Ingrid died of a blood clot in her lung shortly after giving birth to their fourth child, Martin. The couple had two daughters, Birgitta and Ingrid, as well as one other son, Lars. In 1945 he remarried to Elisabeth Margareta Heurlin (1919-1968). Fifteen years after Elisabeth's death, he married a third time, to Karin Lindén (1931-1996).

=== Bishopric ===
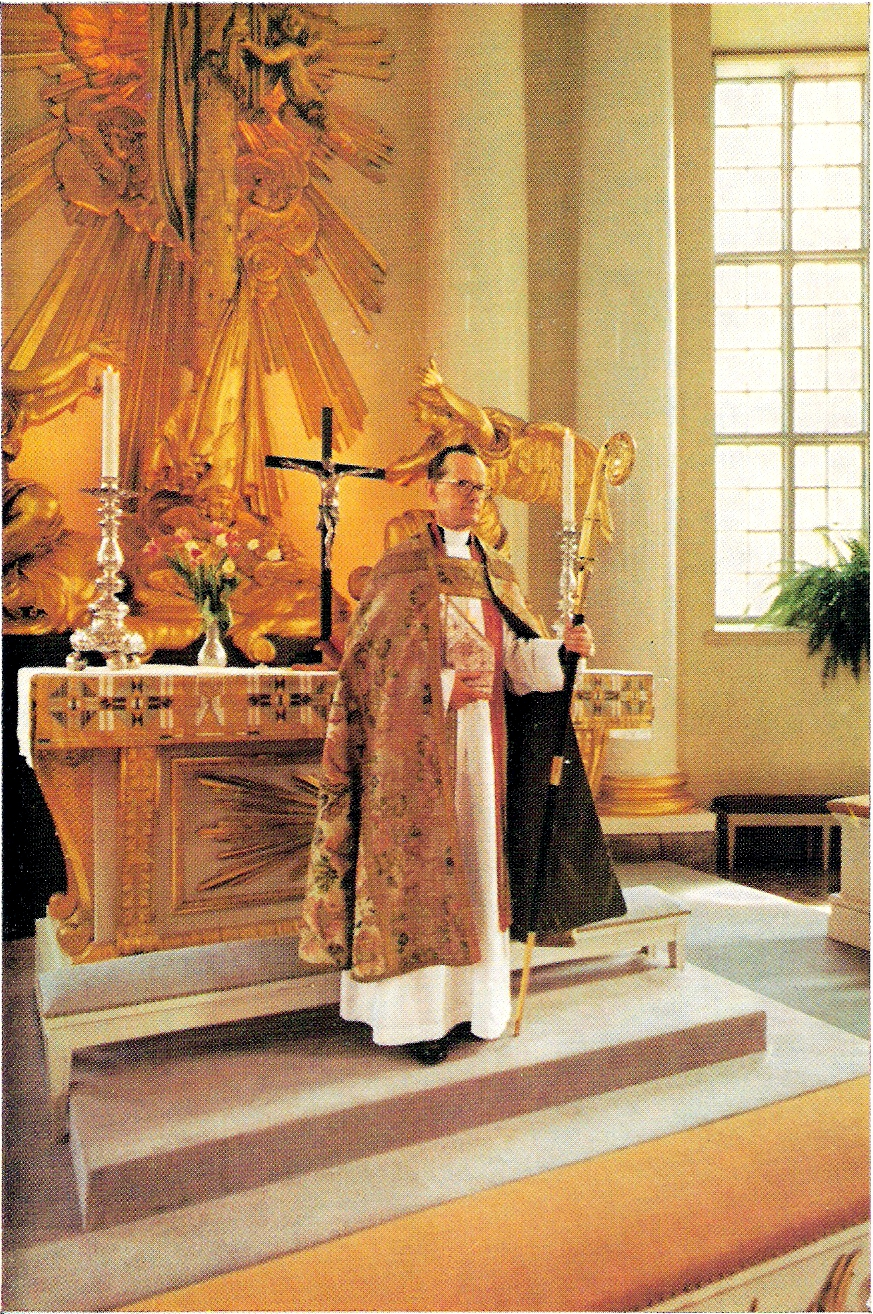
Bishop Bo Giertz of Gothenburg, 1965.

It was unusual that one so young as Giertz (43) would be elected bishop. Until his election he had been just an assistant vicar of a small rural parish. Previous bishops had usually been head priests of large parishes or university theologians.

During his time as bishop (1949–1970) he did not write many major works. As custom dictated, he wrote a Herdabrev (pastoral letter) that outlined his theological program. This “letter” was really a book-length text, in which he outlined the inheritance of the Church of Sweden from three different eras — the first being the early church or New Testament times, the second being the Reformation, and a third on 19th-century revival. In a chapter of this work with the English title “Liturgy and Spiritual Awakening”, he makes a case for the necessity of ancient liturgy in the life of the church. The work shows the importance Giertz put upon the word of God in scripture, sacraments and prayer.

As bishop, Giertz's service for Lutheranism in Sweden included working with unions, touring the parishes for which he was responsible, and ordaining other priests and bishops. Abroad, he represented the Church of Sweden as second vice-president of the Lutheran World Federation. But Giertz was undoubtedly best known for his controversial stridency against the ordination of women. In 1958 the Church of Sweden voted to begin ordaining women; in strong disagreement with that decision, Giertz responded immediately by organizing the group Kyrklig samling kring bibeln och bekännelsen ("Church coalition for the Bible and confession") and writing numerous articles defending his views in journals and newspapers.

== Retirement ==
After his official retirement as bishop in 1970, Giertz returned to the task of writing. His published works from this time of his life included Riddarna på Rhodos ("The Knights of Rhodes", 1972), a novel exploring the theology of the cross amidst the siege of Rhodes in 1522 and a two-volume devotional work, Att tro på Kristus and Att leva med Kristus, published in English as “To Live With Christ.” He also retranslated the New Testament into Swedish, accompanied by 12 volumes of commentary (1976-1982).

== Distinctions ==
- Sweden: Commander of the Grand Cross of the Order of the Polar Star (1961)
- Sweden: Honorary member of the Order of St John in Sweden (1974)
