= Olof Herrlin =

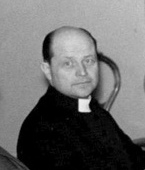
Olof Herrlin

Gunnar Olof Johan Herrlin (1914 in Lund, Sweden – 1992), was Bishop of Visby from 1962 to 1980. Herrlin was one of the leaders of High Church movement in Church of Sweden.

== Selected works ==
Herrlin, Olof, Divine Service: Liturgy in Perspective. Fortress Press, 1966.
