= Helmut Echternach =

German bishop

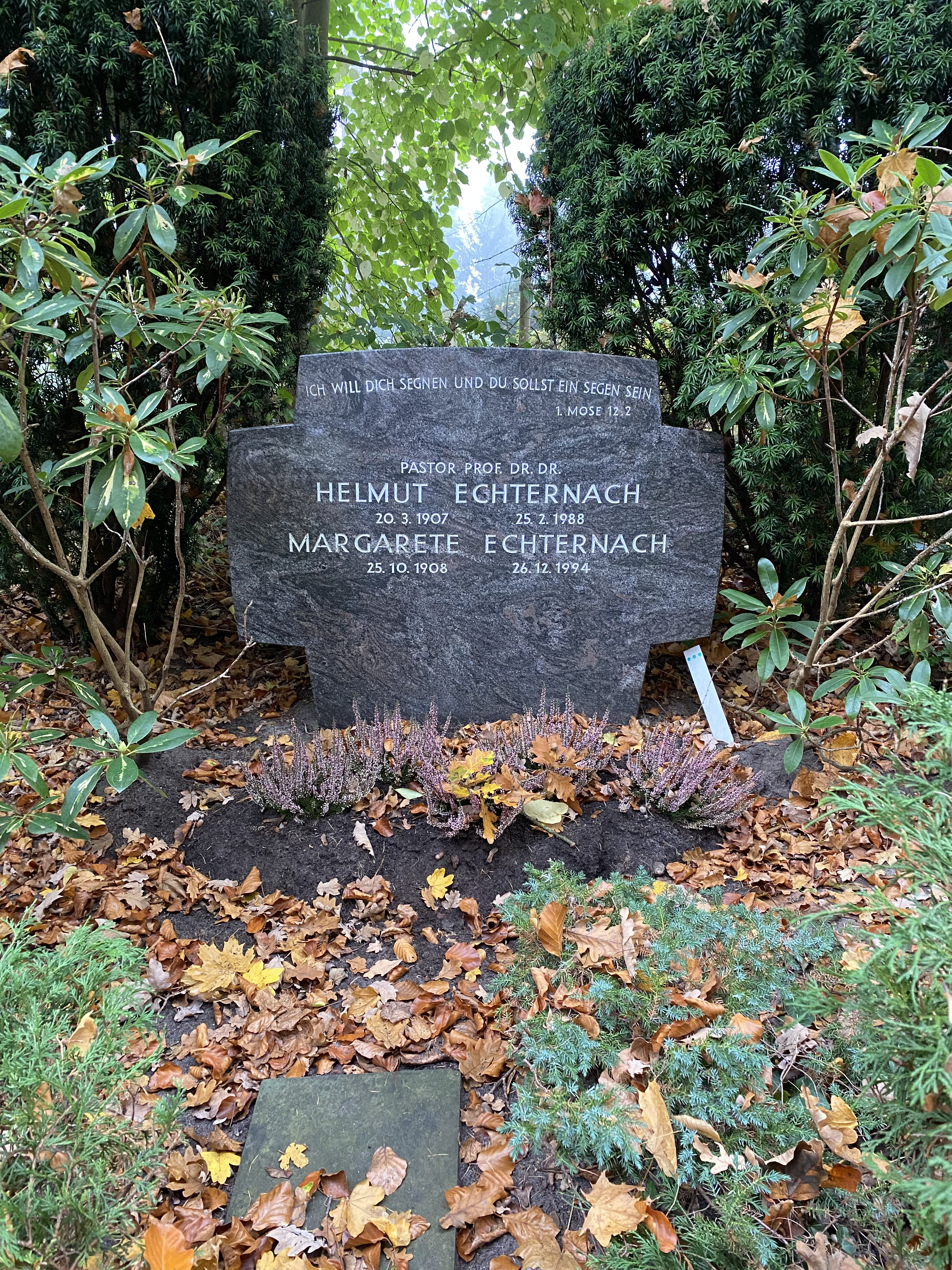
Grave

Helmut Friedbert Richard Siegfried Echternach (20 March 1907 – 25 February 1988) was a German Lutheran theologian and pastor, and one of the leaders of the Lutheran High Church Movement in Germany.

Born in Waltersdorf, Heiligenbeil District, East Prussia (now Pęciszewo, Gmina Braniewo, Braniewo County, Warmian-Masurian Voivodeship), as the son of a pastor, Echternach attended school and university in Königsberg, graduating with the degree of the Licentiate in Theology. He was ordained in Stettin in 1932.

After World War II, Echternach moved to Hamburg and was called to be the pastor at St. Matthew's Church, Hamburg in 1946. One year later he founded an ecumenical discussion group within the Evangelische Akademie Hamburg for dialogue among Roman Catholic, Lutheran and Orthodox Christians. He also taught theology at the Kirchliche Hochschule Hamburg. In 1957 he was called to be the pastor of St. Petri church in Hamburg.

Together with W. Michaelis, Echternach inaugurated the St. Ansgar vespers, a form of Lutheran high church liturgical celebrations, in 1965, which have become quite famous. One year later Echternach founded the "Brotherhood of St. Athanasius", a religious High Church society of men, which regards Holy Orders and apostolic succession essential to the Church.

On 18 October 1966 Echternach was consecrated to the holy order of episcopate by a bishop in apostolic succession. He chose as his episcopal name Ignatius V (cf. Friedrich Heiler). He was called as professor of systematic theology at the Université Européenne in Amsterdam on 1 August 1970 and retired from active ministry in 1973. He died in Hamburg.
