= Friedrich Heiler =

German theologian (1892–1967)

Friedrich Heiler (January 30, 1892 – April 18, 1967) was a German theologian and historian of religion.

Heiler came from a Roman Catholic family. 1918 he became Privatdozent at the Ludwig-Maximilians-Universität München (LMU), from where he 1920 moved to theological faculty of the University of Marburg, where he became professor 1922.

Dissatisfied with tridentine Roman Catholicism of his time he became Lutheran through the Evangelical Catholic influence of liberal Nathan Söderblom after meeting him in Sweden 1919 and receiving Holy Communion in Lutheran church. Soon he became directly involved with Lutheran High Church movement in Germany and 1929 became chairman of Hochkirchliche Vereinigung Augsburgischen Bekenntnisses. Heiler never completely abandoned his Roman Catholic faith, but developed further the idea of "Evangelical Catholicity" based on Augsburg Confession from his own liberal Catholic point of view. He, for example, did not approve the traditional Lutheran doctrine of forensic justification. Heiler favored Franciscan spirituality and he influenced the foundation of Lutheran Franciscan Third Order (Evangelische Franziskaner-Tertiaren) 1927 within Hochkirchliche Vereinigung. Later the issue of the absence of Apostolic succession in Evangelical Church in Germany caused the foundation of Hochkirchliche St.-Johannes-Bruderschaft. Heiler became the Apostolischer Vorsteher of the St.-Johannes-Bruderschaft, arranging to receive the episcopal consecration from a bishop of the Gallican Church, Petrus Gaston Vigué (from the succession line of Joseph René Vilatte).

As a historian of religion, after studying Asian religions, Heiler developed a Modernist view and favored the idea that the "one holy church" includes also non-Christian faiths. He also had a long literary feud with Sadhu Sundar Singh, but nevertheless defended him in time. Lastly he placed a high value in the role of women in the church, even in favour of ordination of women.

Despite Heiler's liberalism, his high church theology was also widely known among other, usually very conservative Lutheran high church theologians outside of Germany, because of at that time generally a rare ecumenical attempt, Heiler's Roman Catholic background and because of his interest on Liturgical Movement. After the ecumenical approach of Second Vatican Council of Roman Catholic Church, Heiler as an ecumenical theologian has been of less interest in academical theology.

== Typology of Prayer ==
Friedrich Heiler is recognized for compiling one of the most comprehensive Christian studies into the phenomenology of prayer. This typology proposes six types of prayer: primitive, ritual, Greek cultural, philosophical, mystical, and prophetic. In these the reader can see a sort of progression from man-centered to God-centered prayer. It has been noted in recent years that Heiler's typology should include seven types, the first being secular spirituality.

Secular Spirituality The most detached prayer from Christianity is that of worldly mysticism, in which the one praying seeks to converse with a deity by immersing their life with the world. This secular petitioning may not include God at all, but instead be the effort to connect with nature. Secular prayer may also simply be a type of inward meditation instead of outward communication. In societies that recognize a sentient God, prayers progress outward.

Primitive Prayer The most basic petitions to higher beings, according to Heiler, derive from felt needs and fear. The basics of these prayers focus on deliverance from misfortune and danger. This type of prayer can be found in all facets of life, from primitive cultures to superstitious industrialized countries. When such prayers seem to be heard, and even answered, the culture is likely to progress into ritualistic prayer.

Ritual Prayer While primitive prayer may come from the heart, once it is recognized for producing results, efforts are made to replicate the effects. Ritualistic prayer derives from such pragmatism in which superstition leads to formulas and litany. In this case, the form, instead of the content, is thought to produce the results. Many Christians fall into this superstition by ending all prayers, “in Jesus’ name”, when Christ himself ended his lesson in prayer with no such formula, instead saying, “for yours is the kingdom, and the power, and the glory, forever, amen.” (Matthew 6:13) The next progression is recognition of the importance of content over method.

Greek Cultural Prayer In the Greek culture, more emphasis is placed on moral needs than physical needs. In other words, this refined primitive prayer sought intercession from gods for cultural needs instead of individual needs. This type of prayer was often the duty of the philosophical elite.

Philosophical Prayer The progression from cultural prayer by the philosophical elite leads into contemplative examination of the relationship between creation and creator. At this point, the person praying recognizes that naïve and realistic prayers may not affect the divine order of the universe. At this level is where the question first is introduced, “Why pray?” Any communicative prayer is no longer for petition, as it seems the immutability of God precludes his intercession, and prayers turn only to thanksgiving. Up until this level, these five types of prayer seek what man can receive from prayer, from the most basic of necessities to transcendent knowledge, but according to Heiler there are two forms of higher prayer which seek an audience with God; Mystical and Prophetic prayer.

Mystical Prayer At this level of prayer, the person praying recognizes that God is outside of them, but capable and perhaps willing to indwell and unite with them through conversation and transformation. While not biblical, Mystical prayer does contain similarities, such as petition, revelation, and elevation of the one praying. The major difference between Mystical and Prophetic prayer is the motive of the one praying. Mysticism seeks an illumination rather than intervention, and sees this illumination as being revealed in stages.

Prophetic Prayer The highest form of prayer, according to Heiler, is that of the biblical model. In this model, there are no stages, as the ability to speak directly to God without formula or meditation began when the veil was rent on the day Christ was crucified. The prophetic prayer allows all four types of biblical prayer from any believer at any time. No limitations are placed on method, location, or liturgical ranking.
