= Arthur Kreinheder =

Father Arthur Carl Kreinheder, C.S.C. (October 1, 1905 – October 13, 1989) was an American Lutheran Benedictine monk and founder of a Lutheran religious order, The Congregation of the Servants of Christ.

== Biography ==
Kreinheder was born in Saint Paul, Minnesota. His father, Oscar Carl Kreinheder (1877-1946), was a pastor of the Lutheran Church–Missouri Synod and the president of Valparaiso University from 1930 to 1939.

After a successful career as a businessman, Arthur Carl Kreinheder went 1950 to study theology at Lund University in Sweden, living in St. Laurence Foundation. Already before he had been in touch with Taizé Community in formation. Briefly, in 1955, he became a novice in the Taize Community.

Kreinheder was ordained to the priesthood in 1956 in Lund by Bishop Anders Nygren and Bishop Gustaf Aulen "for ecumenical work in the United States among Lutherans."

The Congregation of the Servants of Christ, a Lutheran monastery in the Benedictine tradition, was established at St. Augustine's House in 1958 when some other men joined Father Arthur in observing the monastic life and offices of prayer. Through father Arthur there was right in the beginning a connection with Östanbäck Monastery in Sweden after its foundation.

Father Arthur was involved in Christian ecumenism and he was the U.S. secretary of the League for Evangelical-Catholic Reunion.

At the age of 84 Father Arthur Carl Kreinheder died (on Friday, October 13, 1989) in a Pontiac, Michigan, hospital. He had never recovered fully form a stroke suffered in the preceding July. He is buried in the cemetery at St. Augustine's House.
