= The Congregation of the Servants of Christ at Saint Augustine's House =

The Congregation of the Servants of Christ at Saint Augustine's House is an Evangelical Lutheran monastery in the Benedictine tradition, located in Oxford, Michigan. Its first abbot was Fr. Arthur Carl Kreinheder, an Evangelical Lutheran priest from the Church of Sweden who established the monastery in 1958. Monks of the Congregation of the Servants of Christ use the post-nominal letters C.S.C.

At present, there are three monks who have taken solemn vows (of chastity, poverty, and obedience) who reside at Saint Augustine's House, with a number of those who have gone before them. The Congregation of the Servants of Christ at Saint Augustine's House has oblates, which include Lutherans and those of other Christian denominations, such as Roman Catholics. Oblates may be single or married persons. A number of retreats occur at Saint Augustine's House, which is frequented by various Evangelical-Lutheran church congregations or individuals making a pilgrimage. The Congregation of the Servants of Christ at Saint Augustine's House is visited by Evangelical-Lutherans of a number of Evangelical-Lutheran denominations, such as the Lutheran Church – Missouri Synod (LCMS), Lutheran Church - International (LC-I), Wisconsin Evangelical Lutheran Synod (WELS), and North American Lutheran Church (NALC), as well as by Christians of other denominations, given The Congregation of the Servants of Christ's commitment to ecumenism.

Saint Augustine's House sits amidst 42 acres of forest, which includes a chapel, guest house, prayer trail. Mass according to the Lutheran tradition is celebrated daily, along with the Daily Office, which is prayed seven times a day.

The Congregation of the Servants of Christ at Saint Augustine's House maintains close relations with Östanbäck Monastery and Priory of St. Wigbert, which are also Evangelical Lutheran monasteries in the Benedictine tradition.

== See also ==
- Communität Casteller Ring, Evangelical-Lutheran sisters in the Benedictine tradition
