= Bertil Gärtner =

Swedish bishop (1924–2009)

The Right Reverend Bertil Gärtner
- Bishop of Gothenburg
- Church: Church of Sweden
- Diocese: Gothenburg
- In office: 1970–1991
- Predecessor: Bo Giertz
- Successor: Lars Eckerdal

Orders
- Ordination: 12 December 1948
- Consecration: 4 October 1970 by Ruben Josefsson

Personal details
- Born: Bertil Edgar Gärtner; 13 December 1924 Gothenburg, Sweden
- Died: 20 September 2009 (aged 84) Onsala, Sweden
- Denomination: Lutheran
- Spouse: (1) Margit Hultin (2) Eva Berntson
- Motto: Servus Iesu Christi
- Coat of arms: Bertil Gärtner's coat of arms

Bertil Edgar Gärtner (13 December 1924 – 20 September 2009) was a Swedish Lutheran bishop of Gothenburg (1970–1991) and professor of New Testament exegesis at Princeton Theological Seminary, United States.

In 1969, Gärtner became provost of Gothenburg Cathedral and, on 24 July 1970, bishop of the Lutheran Diocese of Gothenburg. Like his predecessor Bo Giertz, Gärtner was theologically conservative and aligned with the High Church tradition. He wrote a number of books on the ministry of the Church as well as on New Testament subjects. He was also one of the Swedish church leaders opposing the ordination of women in the Church of Sweden. In addition, he served as Episcopal Visitor of Societas Sanctae Birgittae from 1972 onwards, Pro Ecclesia from 1990 to 1997, Laurentiistiftelsen from 1997 onwards, and Markusstiftelsen from 1998 to 2009.

== Bibliography ==
- The Temple and the Community in Qumran and the New Testament
- The Areopagus Speech and Natural Revelation
- John 6 and the Jewish Passover
- The Theology of the Gospel According to Thomas
- Iscariot
- Das Amt, der Mann und die Frau im Neuen Testament (Didaskolos: The Office, Man and Woman in the New Testament)

Religious titles
Preceded by Bo Giertz	Bishop of Gothenburg; 1970–1991	Succeeded by Lars Eckerdal
