= Östanbäck Monastery =

Lutheran Benedictine monastery in Sala, Sweden

Coordinates: 59°55′38″N 16°28′03″E

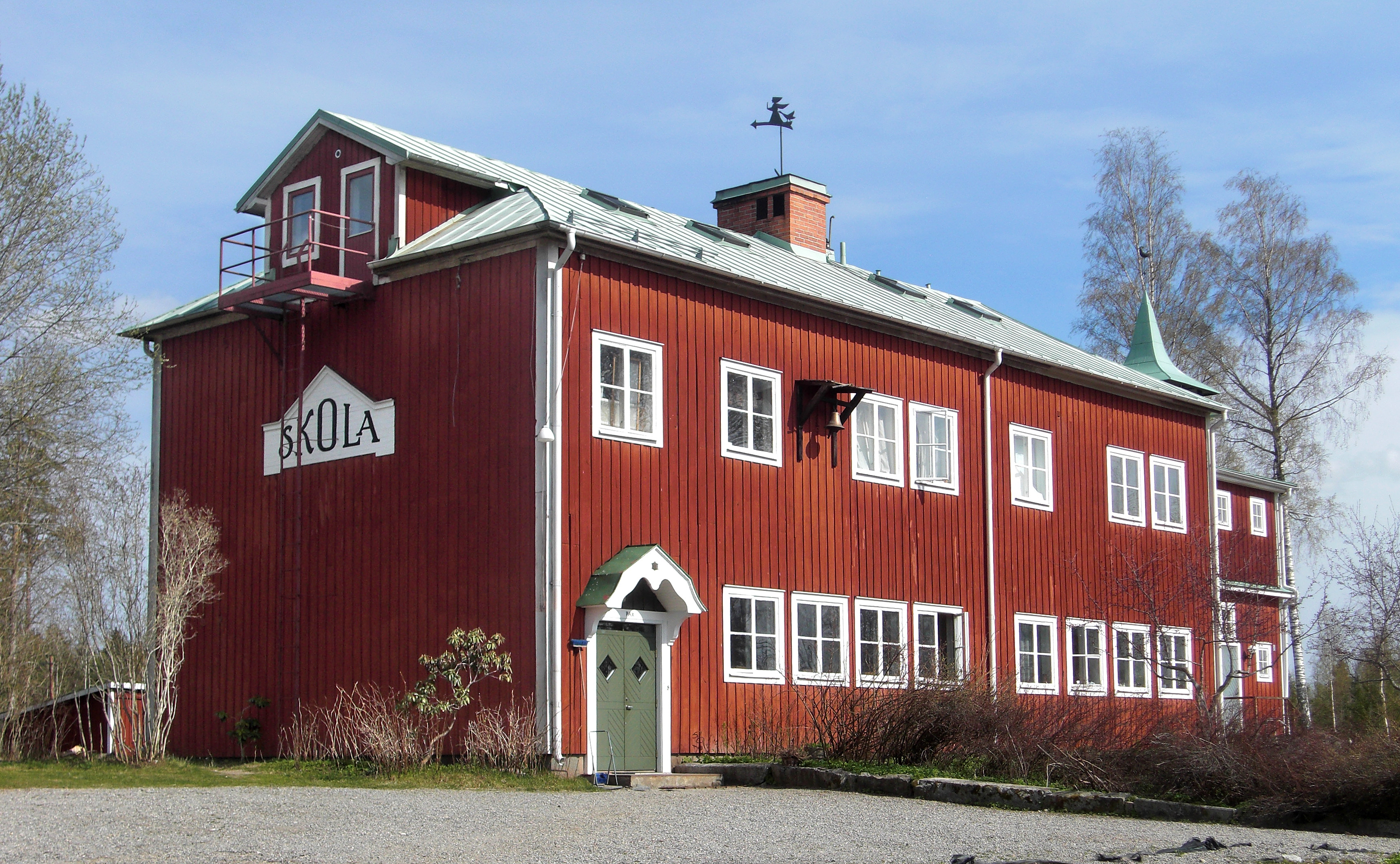
Östanbäck Monastery

Östanbäck Monastery or the Monastery of the Holy Cross and the Prophet Elijah is an Evangelical Lutheran monastery for men in the Benedictine tradition, located outside Sala in Sweden. The Monastery of the Holy Cross and the Prophet Elijah is under the auspices of the Evangelical-Lutheran Church of Sweden. The monks are known as The Brothers of the Holy Cross (Swedish: Heliga korsets brödraskap). The Mass is offered daily and the Divine Office is prayed by the monks seven times a day. The Brothers of the Holy Cross at Östanbäck Monastery engage in candlemaking to support their life, and are active in gardening and the raising of koi. The post-nominal letters used by the Brothers of the Holy Cross at Östanbäck Monastery are O.S.B. given that the monks follow the Rule of Saint Benedict. As of 2000, ten monks live at the Monastery of the Holy Cross and the Prophet Elijah, while a number of oblates are associated with it.

== History ==
The background of the monastery lies in the Lutheran High Church Movement. On 14 February 1960, four theological students, from both the University of Lund and the University of Uppsala, took their vows, forming the Holy Cross Fraternity. The community coalesced around the Rule of Saint Benedict, by which they lived.

Finally the first brethren moved to Östanbäck in November 1970. The chapel and monastery were consecrated on 20 July 1975 by the Evangelical-Lutheran bishop Bengt Sundkler as the Monastery of the Holy Cross and the Prophet Elijah.

== Present day ==
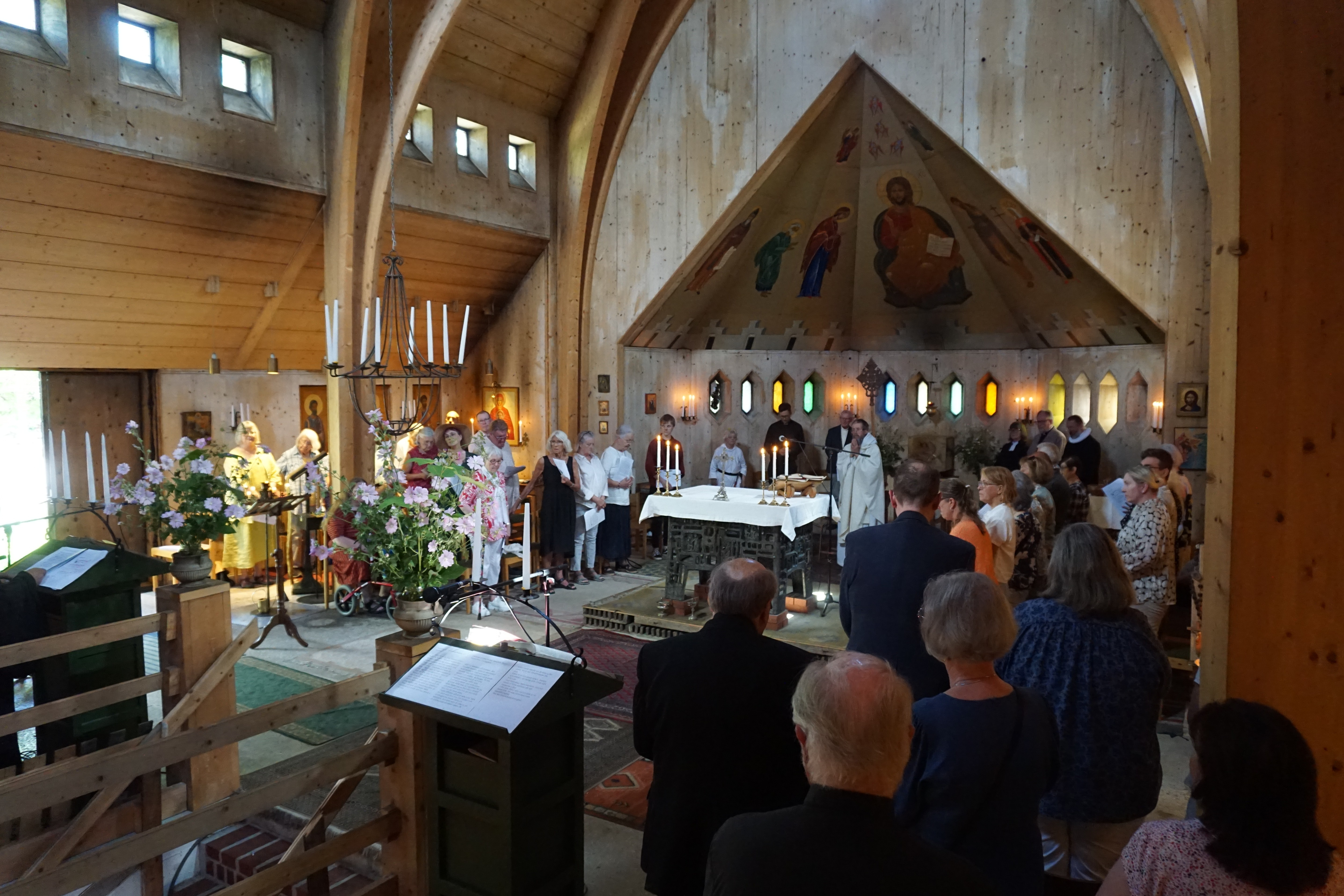
The offering of the Holy Mass at Östanbäck Monastery

The brethren follow the Rule of St. Benedict.

The monastery has a candle factory in Östanbäck, which produces candles in different sizes and shapes, among them Paschal candles.

The leader of the monastery is Father Caesarius Cavallin, OSB. Like the Anglican Benedictine abbots, he is regularly invited as an observer to the Benedictine abbots' conferences in Rome.

== Comparable communities ==
Other Evangelical Lutheran Benedictine communities for men are The Congregation of the Servants of Christ at Saint Augustine's House in Oxford, Michigan, United States, and the Priory of St. Wigbert in Germany.
