= Christianity in the 20th century =

Christianity in the 20th century was characterized by an accelerating secularization of Western society, which had begun in the 19th century, and by the spread of Christianity to non-Western regions of the world.

Christian ecumenism grew in importance, beginning at the Edinburgh Missionary Conference in 1910, and accelerated after the Second Vatican Council of the Catholic Church, The Liturgical Movement became significant in both Catholic and Protestant Christianity, especially in Anglicanism.

At the same time, state-promoted atheism in communist Eastern Europe and the Soviet Union brought persecution to many Eastern Orthodox and other Christians. Many Orthodox came to Western Europe and the Americas, leading to greatly increased contact between Western and Eastern Christianity. Nevertheless, church attendance declined more in Western Europe than it did in the East. The Catholic Church instituted many reforms to modernize. Catholic and Protestant missionaries also made inroads in East Asia, increasing their presence and activity in Korea, mainland China, Taiwan, and Japan.

== Role under authoritarianism ==
=== Russian Orthodoxy under the Soviet Union ===
Since the 18th century, the Russian Orthodox Church had been run by the Most Holy Synod of bishops and lay bureaucrats, appointed by the tsar. With the Russian Civil War came a brief re-establishment of an independent patriarchate in 1917. The Russian Orthodox Church collaborated with the White Army in the civil war after the October Revolution. This may have further strengthened the Bolshevik animus against the church. According to Vladimir Lenin, a communist regime cannot remain neutral on the question of religion but must take action against it. He argued that a classless society would not contain religion. Lenin quashed the Church just a few years after the re-establishment, imprisoning or killing many clergy and faithful. Part of the clergy escaped the Soviet persecutions by fleeing abroad, where they founded an independent church in exile.

After the October Revolution, there was a movement within the Soviet Union to unite all of the people of the world under Communist rule. This included the Eastern Bloc as well as the Balkan states. Since some of these Slavic states tied their ethnic heritage to their ethnic churches, both the peoples and their church where targeted by the Soviets. Criticism of atheism was strictly forbidden and sometimes lead to imprisonment.

The Soviet Union was the first state to have as an ideological objective the elimination of religion. Toward that end, the communist regime confiscated church property, ridiculed religion, harassed believers, and propagated atheism in the schools. Actions toward particular religions, however, were determined by state interests, and most organised religions were never outlawed. Some actions against Orthodox priests and believers along with execution included torture being sent to prison camps, labour camps or mental hospitals. The result of this state atheism was to transform the Church into a persecuted and martyred Church. In the first five years after the Bolshevik revolution, 28 bishops and 1,200 priests were executed. This included people like the Grand Duchess Elizabeth Fyodorovna who was a monastic. Along with her murder was Grand Duke Sergei Mikhailovich Romanov; the Princes Ioann Konstantinovich, Konstantin Konstantinovich, Igor Konstantinovich and Vladimir Pavlovich Paley; Grand Duke Sergei's secretary, Fyodor Remez; and Varvara Yakovleva, a sister from the Grand Duchess Elizabeth's convent. They were herded into the forest, pushed into an abandoned mineshaft, and grenades were then hurled into the mineshaft. Her remains were buried in Jerusalem, in the Church of Maria Magdalene.

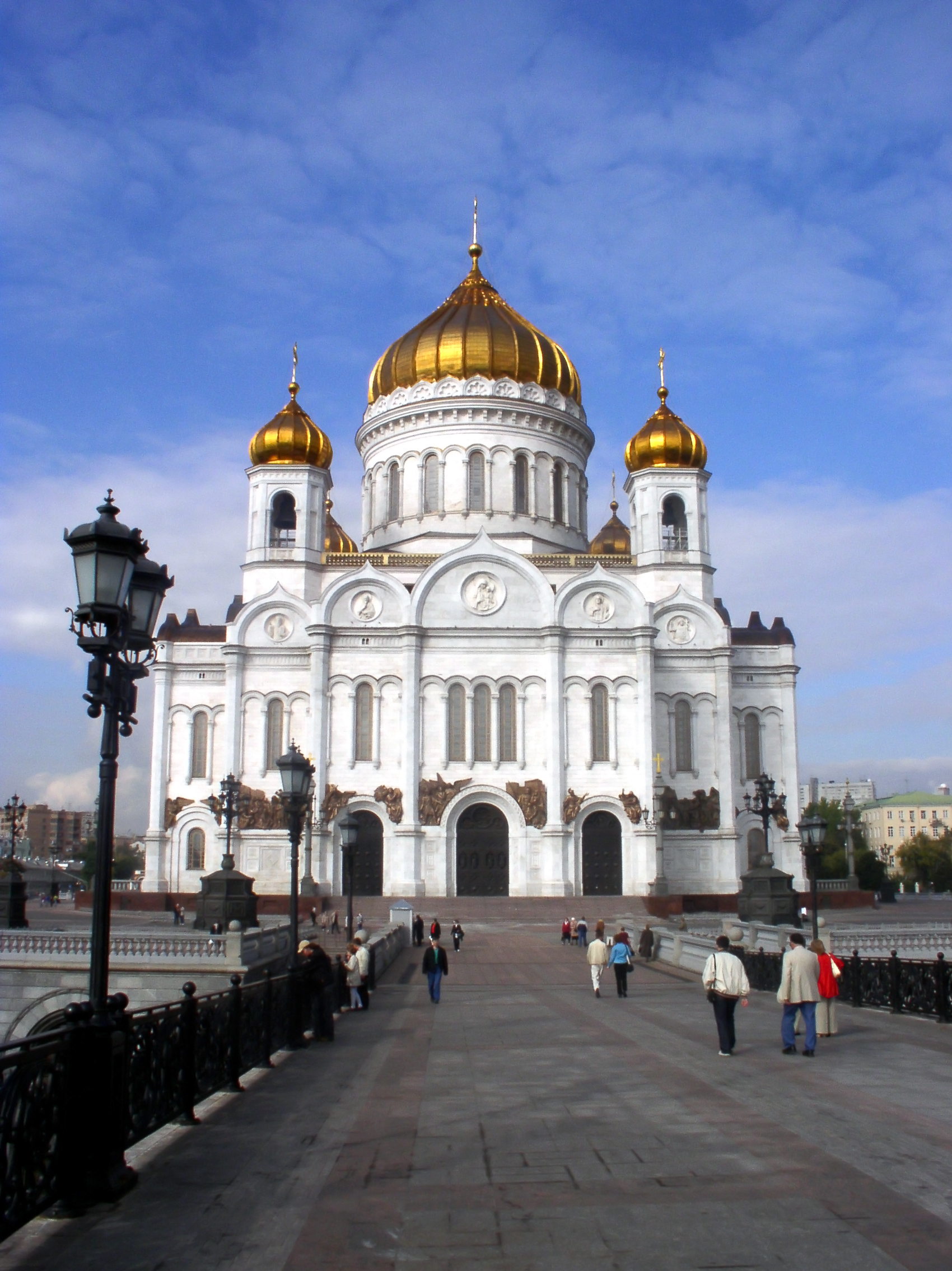
Christ the Saviour Cathedral Moscow after reconstruction

=== Catholics and Protestants under the Third Reich ===
The relationship between Nazism and Protestantism, especially the German Lutheran Church, was complex. Though the majority of Protestant church leaders in Germany supported the Nazis' growing anti-Jewish activities, some such as Dietrich Bonhoeffer (a Lutheran pastor) were strongly opposed to the Nazis. Bonhoeffer was later found guilty in the conspiracy to assassinate Hitler and was executed.

In the 1937 encyclical Mit brennender Sorge, issued by Pope Pius XI (after being drafted by Cardinal Eugenio Pacelli, who would become Pope Pius XII) Pius XI warned Catholics that antisemitism is incompatible with Christianity. Read from the pulpits of all German Catholic churches, it described Hitler as an insane and arrogant prophet and was the first official denunciation of Nazism made by any major organization. Nazi persecution of the Church in Germany then began by "outright repression" and "staged prosecutions of monks for homosexuality, with the maximum of publicity". When Dutch bishops protested against deportation of Jews in the Netherlands, the Nazis responded with even more severe measures.

In Austria there was strong Catholic resistance to National Socialism. That was for example the "Österreichische Freiheitsbewegung", the "Antifaschistische Freiheitsbewegung Österreichs" or the "Großösterreichische Freiheitsbewegung" but also the group around Karl Burian, which even planned to blow up the Gestapo headquarters in Vienna. The outstanding resistance group is that around the priest Heinrich Maier. This Catholic resistance group very successfully passed on plans and production sites for V-2 rockets, Tiger tanks and aircraft to the Allies. From the fall of 1943 at least, these transmissions informed the Allies about the exact site plans of German production plants. With the location sketches of the manufacturing facilities, the Allied bombers were given precise air strikes. In contrast to many other German resistance groups, the Maier Group informed very early about the mass murder of Jews through their contacts with the Semperit factory near Auschwitz. Numerous Austrian priests such as Hermann Kagerer, Johann Gruber, Andreas Rieser, Matthias Spanlang, Konrad Just and Johann Steinbock were active in the resistance against the Nazi system. In total, as Austrian resistance fighters, 706 priests were imprisoned in the Nazi regime, 128 in concentration camps and 20 to 90 executed or murdered in the concentration camp.

Neo-orthodoxy is a branch of Protestant thought which arose in the early 20th century in the context of the rise of the Third Reich in Germany and the accompanying political and ecclesiastical destabilization of Europe in the years before and during World War II. Neo-orthodoxy's highly contextual, dialectical modes of argument and reasoning often rendered its main premises incomprehensible to American thinkers and clergy, and it was frequently either dismissed out of hand as unrealistic or cast into the reigning left- or right-wing molds of theologizing. Karl Barth, a Swiss Reformed pastor and professor, brought this movement into being by drawing upon earlier criticisms of established (largely modernist) Protestant thought made by the likes of Søren Kierkegaard and Franz Overbeck. Bonhoeffer adhered to this school of thought; his classic The Cost of Discipleship is likely the best-known and accessible statement of the neo-orthodox philosophy.

In Poland, the Nazis murdered over 2,500 monks and priests while even more were sent to concentration camps. The Priester-Block (priests barracks) in Dachau concentration camp lists 2,600 Roman Catholic priests. Joseph Stalin staged an even more severe persecution at almost the same time.

After World War II historians such as David Kertzer accused the Church of encouraging centuries of antisemitism, and they accused Pope Pius XII of not doing enough to stop Nazi atrocities. Prominent members of the Jewish community, including Golda Meir, Albert Einstein, Moshe Sharett and Rabbi Isaac Herzog contradicted the criticisms and spoke highly of Pius' efforts to protect Jews, while others such as rabbi David G. Dalin noted that "hundreds of thousands" of Jews were saved by the Church. Regarding the matter, historian Derek Holmes wrote, "There is no doubt that the Catholic districts, resisted the lure of National Socialism Nazism far better than the Protestant ones." Pope Pius XI declared – Mit brennender Sorge – that fascist governments had hidden "pagan intentions" and expressed the irreconcilability of the Catholic position and Totalitarian Fascist State Worship, which placed the nation above God and fundamental human rights and dignity. His declaration that "Spiritually, [Christians] are all Semites" prompted the Nazis to give him the title "Chief Rabbi of the Christian World".

Many Catholic laypeople and clergy played notable roles in sheltering Jews during the Holocaust. The head rabbi of Rome became a Catholic in 1945, and in honour of the actions the pope had undertaken to save Jewish lives, the rabbi took the name Eugenio (the pope's first name). A former Israeli consul in Italy claimed: "The Catholic Church saved more Jewish lives during the war than all the other churches, religious institutions, and rescue organisations put together."

== Spread of secularism ==
In Europe there has been a general move away from religious observance and belief in Christian teachings and a move towards secularism. The "secularization of society", attributed to the time of the Enlightenment and its following years, is largely responsible for the spread of secularism. For example, the Gallup International Millennium Survey showed that only about one sixth of Europeans attend regular religious services, less than half gave God "high importance", and only about 40% believe in a "personal God". Nevertheless, the large majority considered that they "belong" to a religious denomination. Numbers show that the "de-Christianization" of Europe has slowly begun to swing in the opposite direction. Renewal in certain quarters of the Anglican church, as well as in pockets of Protestantism on the continent attest to this initial reversal of the secularization of Europe, the continent in which Christianity originally took its strongest roots and world expansion. In North America, South America and Australia, the other three continents where Christianity is the dominant professed religion, religious observance is much higher than in Europe.

South America, historically Catholic since European colonization, has experienced a large Evangelical and Pentecostal infusion in the 20th century with the influx of Christian missionaries from abroad. For example: Brazil, South America's largest country, is the largest Catholic country in the world and is the largest Evangelical country in the world (based on population). Some of the largest Christian congregations in the world are found in Brazil.

== Catholic Church ==
=== India and China ===
In 1939 Pope Pius XII, within weeks of his coronation, radically reverted the 250-year-old Vatican policy and permitted the veneration of dead family members. The Church began to flourish again with twenty new arch-dioceses, seventy-nine dioceses and thirty-eight apostolic prefects, but only until 1949, when the Communist revolution took over the country.

=== Philippines ===
On 3 August 1902, after the Philippine–American War, the schismatic Philippine Independent Church was proclaimed by members of Unión Obrera Democrática Filipina, the first-ever trade union in Philippine history, led by writer-activist-turned-politician Isabelo de los Reyes. Its first appointed head was Gregorio Aglipay, a former Roman Catholic priest excommunicated by the Catholic Church in the Philippines in 1899, upon the expressed permission of Pope Leo XIII, due to his involvement with revolutionary activities during both the Philippine Revolution and Philippine–American War. De los Reyes pushed the establishment of the church after his talks with Giuseppe Francica-Nava de Bontifè, then the Apostolic Nuncio to Spain, in 1899 to request the Holy See in looking into the conditions of the Philippine clergy had failed. The Philippine clergy was ruled by Spanish friars at the time and de los Reyes and Aglipay had wanted to replace them with native Filipino priests instead. The new church retained most of the Roman Catholic traditions, except that it does not subject its episcopal authority to the Bishop of Rome. Members of the Unión Obrera Democrática Filipina and de los Reyes were also excommunicated in December 1902 and early 1903, respectively, shortly after the establishment of the Philippine Independent Church.

=== Second Vatican Council ===
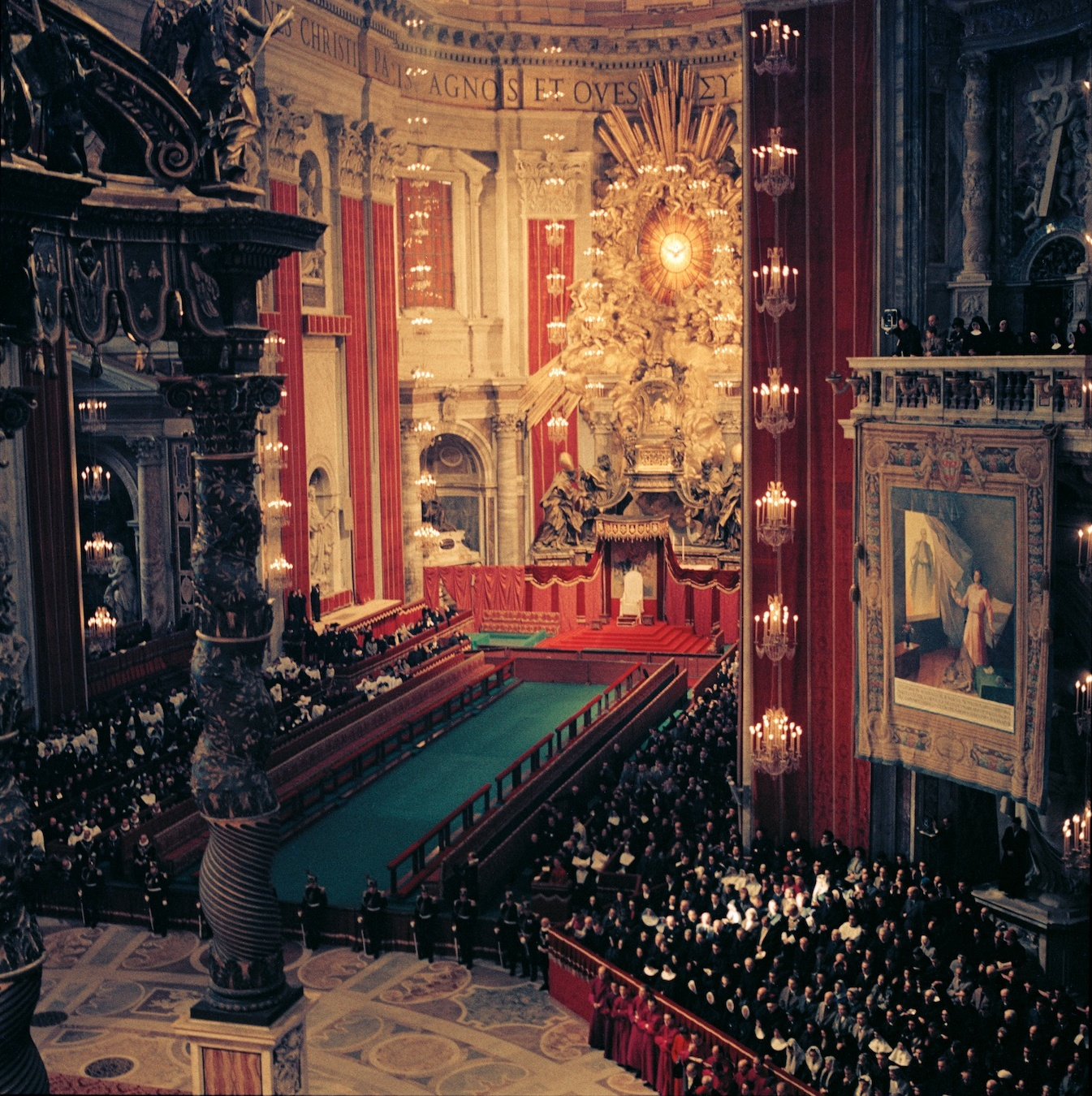
The interior of Saint Peter's Basilica. Prior to these years, the basilica was illuminated using beeswax candles, suspended on high chandeliers.

A major event of the Second Vatican Council, known as Vatican II, was the issuance by Pope Paul VI and Patriarch Athenagoras of a joint expression of regret for many of the past actions that had led up to the Great Schism between the Western and Eastern churches, expressed as the Catholic-Orthodox Joint declaration of 1965. At the same time, they lifted the mutual excommunications dating from the 11th century.

Intended as a continuation of Vatican I, under Pope John XXIII the council developed into an engine of modernisation. It was tasked with making the historical teachings of the Church clear to a modern world and made pronouncements on topics including the nature of the church, the mission of the laity and religious freedom. The council approved a revision of the liturgy and permitted the Latin liturgical rites to use vernacular languages as well as Latin during mass and other sacraments. Efforts by the Church to improve Christian unity became a priority. In addition to finding common ground on certain issues with Protestant churches, the Catholic Church has discussed the possibility of unity with the Eastern Orthodox Church.

Vatican II reaffirmed everything Vatican I taught about papal primacy and infallibility, but it added important points about bishops. Bishops, it says, are not "vicars of the Roman Pontiff". Rather, in governing their local churches they are "vicars and legates of Christ". Together, they form a body, a "college", whose head is the pope. This episcopal college is responsible for the well-being of the Universal Church. Here in a nutshell are the basic elements of the Council's much-discussed communio ecclesiology, which affirms the importance of local churches and the doctrine of collegiality. And Vatican II highlighted the importance of Marian veneration in Lumen gentium. During the council, Paul VI proclaimed Mary to be the Mother of the Church.

Changes to old rites and ceremonies following Vatican II produced a variety of responses. Some stopped going to church, while others tried to preserve the old liturgy with the help of sympathetic priests. These formed the basis of today's Traditionalist Catholic groups, which believe that the reforms of Vatican II have gone too far. Liberal Catholics form another dissenting group who feel that the Vatican II reforms did not go far enough. The liberal views of theologians such as Hans Küng and Charles Curran led to Church withdrawal of their authorization to teach as Catholics. According to Professor Thomas Bokenkotter, most Catholics "accepted the changes more or less gracefully". In 2007, Benedict XVI reinstated the old mass as an option, to be celebrated upon request by the faithful.

A new Codex Juris Canonici – canon law called for by John XXIII, was promulgated by Pope John Paul II on 25 January 1983. It includes numerous reforms and alterations in Church law and Church discipline for the Latin Church. It replaced the 1917 version issued by Benedict XV.

=== Modernism and liberation theology ===
In the 1960s, growing social awareness and politicization in the Latin American Church gave birth to liberation theology. Peruvian priest Gustavo Gutiérrez became its primary proponent, and in 1979 the bishops' conference in Mexico officially declared the Latin American Church's "preferential option for the poor". Archbishop Óscar Romero, a supporter of the movement, became the region's most famous contemporary martyr in 1980, when he was murdered while saying mass by forces allied with the government.

Both Pope John Paul II and Pope Benedict XVI (as Cardinal Ratzinger) denounced the movement. The Brazilian theologian Leonardo Boff was twice ordered to cease publishing and teaching. While Pope John Paul II was criticized for his severity in dealing with proponents of the movement, he maintained that the Church, in its efforts to champion the poor, should not do so by resorting to violence or partisan politics. The movement is still alive in Latin America today, though the Church now faces the challenge of Pentecostal revival in much of the region.

=== Social and sexuality issues ===
Quadragesimo anno was issued by Pope Pius XI on 15 May 1931, 40 years after Rerum novarum. Unlike Leo, who mainly addressed the condition of workers, Pius XI concentrated on the ethical implications of the social and economic order. He called for the reconstruction of the social order based on the principle of solidarity and subsidiarity. He noted major dangers for human freedom and dignity, arising from unrestrained capitalism and totalitarian communism.

The social teachings of Pope Pius XII repeated these teachings and applied them in greater detail not only to workers and owners of capital, but also to other professions such as politicians, educators, housewives, farmers bookkeepers, international organizations, and all aspects of life including the military. Going beyond Pius XI, he also defined social teachings in the areas of medicine, psychology, sport, TV, science, law and education. There is virtually no social issue, which Pius XII did not address and relate to the Christian faith. He was called "the Pope of Technology", for his willingness and ability to examine the social implications of technological advances. The dominant concern was the continued rights and dignity of the individual. With the beginning of the space age at the end of his pontificate, Pius XII explored the social implications of space exploration and satellites on the social fabric of humanity asking for a new sense of community and solidarity in light of existing papal teachings on subsidiarity.

The sexual revolution of the 1960s brought challenging issues for the Church. Pope Paul VI's 1968 encyclical Humanae Vitae reaffirmed the Catholic Church's traditional view of marriage and marital relations and asserted a continued proscription of artificial birth control. In addition, the encyclical reaffirmed the sanctity of life from conception to natural death and asserted a continued condemnation of both abortion and euthanasia as grave sins which were equivalent to murder.

Efforts to consider the ordination of women led Pope John Paul II to issue two documents to explain Church teaching. Mulieris Dignitatem was issued in 1988 to clarify women's equally important and complementary role in the work of the Church. Then in 1994, Ordinatio Sacerdotalis explained that the Church extends ordination only to men to follow the example of Jesus, who chose only men for this specific duty.

=== Persecutions of Roman Catholic clergy ===
During the Mexican Revolution between 1926 and 1934, over 3,000 priests were exiled or assassinated. In an effort to prove that "God would not defend the Church", president Plutarco Elías Calles ordered "hideous desecration of churches ... there were parodies of (church) services, nuns were raped and any priests captured ... were shot ...". Calles was eventually deposed, and despite the persecution, the Church in Mexico continued to grow. A 2000 census reported that 88% of Mexicans identify as Catholic.

In 1954, under the regime of General Juan Perón, Argentina saw extensive destruction of churches, denunciations of clergy and confiscation of Catholic schools as Perón attempted to extend state control over national institutions. Cuba, under atheist Fidel Castro, succeeded in reducing the Church's ability to work by deporting the archbishop and 150 Spanish priests, discriminating against Catholics in public life and education and refusing to accept them as members of the Communist Party. The subsequent flight of 300,000 people from the island also helped to diminish the Church there.

Persecutions of the Catholic Church took place not only in Mexico but also in 20th-century Spain and the Soviet Union. Pius XI called this the "terrible triangle". The "harsh persecution short of total annihilation of the clergy, monks, and nuns and other people associated with the Church" began in 1918 and continued well into the 1930s. The Spanish Civil War started in 1936, during which thousands of churches were destroyed and thirteen bishops and some 6,832 clergy and religious Spaniards were assassinated. After the Church persecutions in Mexico, Spain and the Soviet Union, Pius XI defined communism as the main adversary of the Catholic Church in his encyclical Divini Redemptoris issued on 19 March 1937. He blamed Western powers and media for a conspiracy of silence on the persecutions carried out by Communist, Socialist and Fascist forces.

== Protestantism ==
=== Anglicanism ===
In the early 20th century when the Anglo-Catholic Movement was at its height, the Anglican Communion had hundreds of orders and communities. However, since the 1960s there has been a sharp falling off in the numbers of religious in many parts of the Anglican Communion, most notably in the United Kingdom and the United States. Many once large and international communities have been reduced to a single convent or monastery composed of elderly men or women. There are however, still thousands of Anglican religious working today in religious communities around the world. While vocations remain few in some areas, Anglican religious communities are experiencing substantial growth in Africa, Asia, and Oceania.

=== Evangelicalism ===
Throughout the 20th century, evangelicalism was, and continues to be, a fundamentalist branch of the larger protestant church. Evangelicalism largely arose in opposition to a revision of traditional christian beliefs brought about by the modernist movement within the church. Most notably, evangelicals and other christian fundamentalists believe in the historical accuracy and inerrancy of the Bible, and as such deny the theory of evolution.

Countries by percentage of Protestants in 1938 and 2010. Pentecostal and Evangelical Protestant denominations fueled much of the growth in Africa and Latin America.

In the U.S. and elsewhere in the world, there has been a marked rise in the evangelical wing of Protestant denominations, especially those that are more exclusively evangelical, and a corresponding decline in the mainline liberal churches. In the post–World War I era, Liberalism was the faster-growing sector of the American church. Liberal wings of denominations were on the rise, and a considerable number of seminaries were taught from a liberal perspective. In the post–World War II era, the trend began to swing back towards the conservative camp in America's seminaries and church structures. Those entering seminaries and other postgraduate theologically related programs have shown more conservative leanings than their average predecessors.

The Evangelical push of the 1940s and 1950s produced a movement that continues to have wide influence. In the southern United States the Evangelicals, represented by leaders such as Billy Graham, experienced a notable surge.

Australia has seen renewal in different parts of the Anglican Church, as well as a growing presence of an Evangelical community. Although more "traditional" in its Anglican roots, the nation has seen growth in its religious sector.

=== Pentecostal movement ===
The Third Great Awakening had its roots in the Holiness movement which had developed in the late 19th century, giving way to the Pentecostal movement. In 1902, American evangelists Reuben Archer Torrey and Charles M. Alexander conducted meetings in Melbourne, Australia, resulting in more than 8,000 converts.

Torrey and Alexander were involved in the beginnings of the Welsh revival which led Jessie Penn-Lewis write her book "War on the Saints". In 1906 the modern Pentecostal Movement was born at Azusa Street in Los Angeles.

From there Pentecostalism spread around the world. These Pentecost-like manifestations have steadily been in evidence throughout the history of Christianity—such as seen in the first two Great Awakenings that started in the United States. However, Azusa Street is widely accepted as the birthplace of the modern Pentecostal movement. Pentecostalism, which in turn birthed the Charismatic movement within already established denominations, continues to be an important force in western Christianity.

=== Ecumenism ===
Ecumenical movements within Protestantism have focused on determining a list of doctrines and practices essential to being Christian and thus extending to all groups which fulfil these basic criteria a (more or less) co-equal status, with perhaps one's own group still retaining a "first among equal" standing. This process involved a redefinition of the idea of "the Church" from traditional theology. This ecclesiology, known as non-denominationalism, contends that each group (which fulfils the essential criteria of "being Christian") is a sub-group of a greater "Christian Church", itself a purely abstract concept with no direct representation, i.e., no group, or "denomination", claims to be "the Church". Obviously, this ecclesiology is at variance with other groups that indeed consider themselves to be "the Church". The "essential criteria" generally consist of belief in the Trinity, belief that Jesus Christ is the only way to have forgiveness and eternal life, and that He died and rose again bodily.

=== Monasticism ===
Christian monasticism experienced renewal in the form of several new foundations with an 'inter-Christian' vision for their respective communities. Expressions of ecumenical monasticism can be seen in the Bose Monastic Community and communities of the New Monasticism movement arising from Protestant Evangelicalism.

In 1944 Roger Schütz, a pastor of the Swiss Reformed Church, founded a small religious brotherhood in France which became known as the Taizé Community. Although he was partly inspired by the hope of reviving monasticism in the Protestant tradition, the brotherhood was interdenominational, accepting Roman Catholic brothers, and is thus an ecumenical rather than a specifically Protestant community.

The Order of Ecumenical Franciscans is a religious order of men and women devoted to following the examples of Saint Francis of Assisi and Saint Clare of Assisi in their life and understanding of the Christian gospel: sharing a love for creation and those who have been marginalized. It includes members of many different denominations, including Roman Catholics, Anglicans, and a range of Protestant traditions. The Order understands its charism to include not only ecumenical efforts and the traditional emphases of the Franciscans in general, but also to help to develop relationships between the various Franciscan orders.

=== Modernism and liberal Protestantism ===
Liberal Christianity, sometimes called liberal theology, is an umbrella term covering diverse, philosophically-informed religious movements and moods within late-18th-, 19th- and 20th-century Christianity. The word "liberal" in liberal Christianity does not refer to a leftist political agenda or set of beliefs, but rather to the freedom of dialectic process associated with continental philosophy and other philosophical and religious paradigms developed during the Age of Enlightenment. Despite its name, liberal Christianity has always been thoroughly protean.

Enlightenment-era liberalism held that man is a political creature and that liberty of thought and expression should be his highest value. The development of liberal Christianity owes much of its progression to the works of philosophers Immanuel Kant and Friedrich Schleiermacher. As a whole, liberal Christianity is a product of a continuing philosophical dialogue. Many 20th-century liberal Christians have been influenced by philosophers Edmund Husserl and Martin Heidegger. Examples of important liberal Christian thinkers are Rudolf Bultmann and John A.T. Robinson.

=== Fundamentalism ===
Fundamentalist Christianity began as a less rigid movement than the current movement described and self-described by that term. It is a movement that arose within British and American Protestantism in the late 19th and early 20th centuries, mainly in reaction to modernism and certain liberal Protestant groups that denied doctrines considered fundamental to Christianity yet still called themselves Christian. Thus, fundamentalism sought to re-establish basic tenets that could not be denied without relinquishing a Christian identity, the "fundamentals". These distinctive tenets defined inerrancy of the Bible, Sola Scriptura, the Virgin Birth of Jesus, the doctrine of substitutionary atonement, the bodily resurrection of Jesus, and the imminent return of Jesus Christ. The movement divided over these and other factors over time into those now known as Fundamentalists, retaining its name, and those known as Evangelicals, retaining its original concerns.

== Eastern Orthodoxy ==
=== Emigration to the West ===
One of the most striking developments in modern historical Orthodoxy is the dispersion of Orthodox Christians to the West. Emigration from Greece and the Near East in the 20th century created a sizable Orthodox diaspora in Western Europe, North and South America, and Australia. In addition, the Bolshevik Revolution forced thousands of Russian exiles westward. As a result, Orthodoxy's traditional frontiers have been profoundly modified. Millions of Orthodox are no longer geographically "eastern" since they live permanently in their newly adopted countries in the West. Nonetheless, they remain Eastern Orthodox in their faith and practice. Virtually all the Orthodox nationalities—Greek, Arab, Russian, Serbian, Albanian, Ukrainian, Romanian, and Bulgarian—are represented in the United States.

=== Revised Julian calendar ===
In 1924, Ecumenical Patriarch Gregory VII of Constantinople introduced the use of the Revised Julian calendar throughout the patriarchate. Under the influence of the Ecumenical Patriarchate of Constantinople, the Church of Greece and Church of Cyprus also imported the New Calendar. The Romanian Orthodox Church adopted the Revised Julian calendar in 1924. The Churches of Alexandria and Antioch adopted the Revised Julian calendar in 1928. The Bulgarian Orthodox Church also adopted the Revised Julian calendar in 1968.

However, the churches of Jerusalem, Russia, Serbia, Georgia, Mount Athos resolutely refused adopted the Revised Julian calendar.

=== Constantinople ===
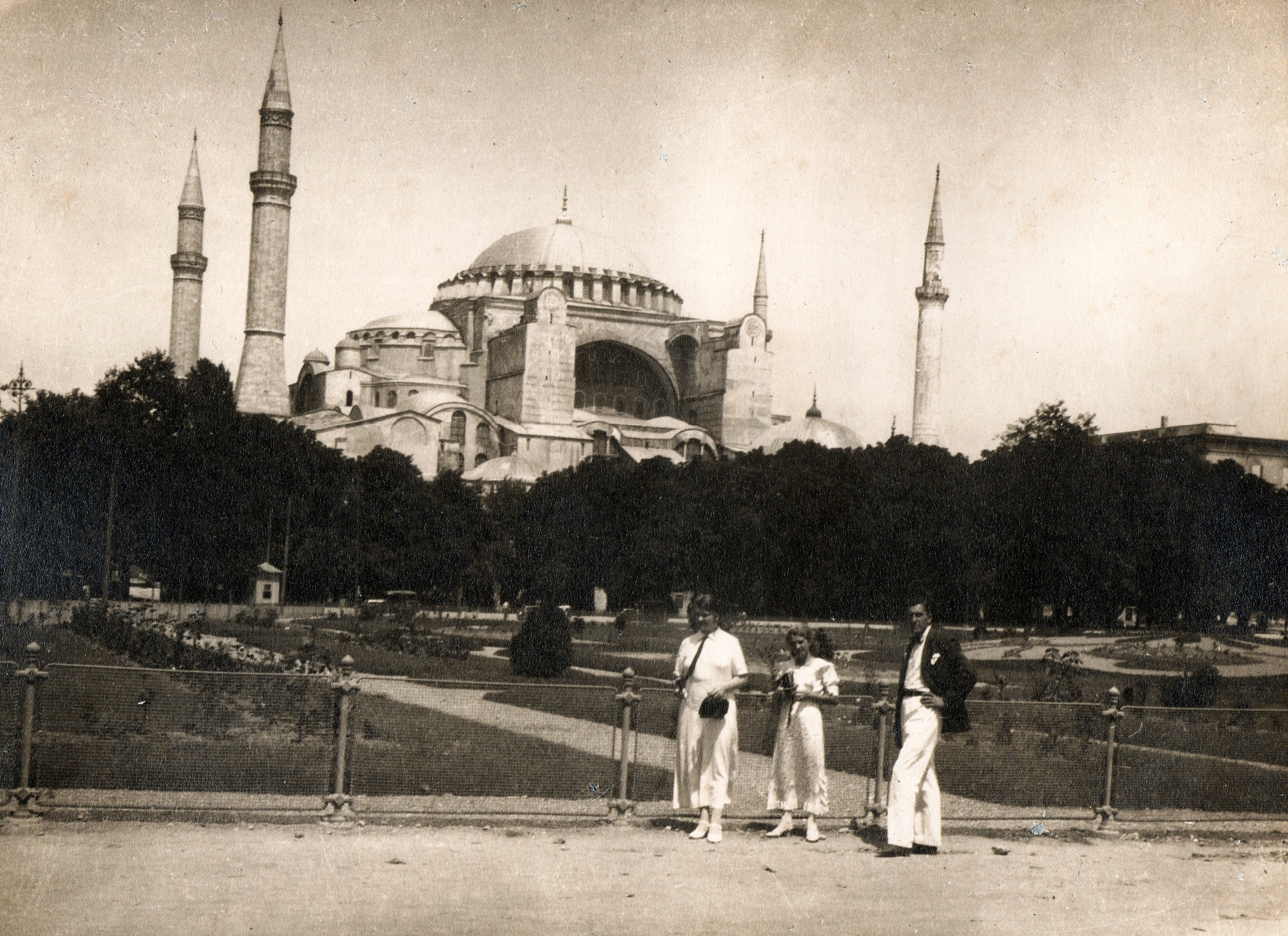
Hagia Sophia in 1937

In 1935, the first Turkish President and founder of the Republic of Turkey, Mustafa Kemal Atatürk, transformed Hagia Sophia into a museum. The carpet and the layer of mortar underneath them were removed and marble floor decorations such as the omphalion appeared for the first time since the Fossatis' restoration, while the white plaster covering many of the mosaics was removed.

In 1971, the Halki Seminary was closed by a Turkish law that forbids private universities from functioning in Turkey.

=== Russia ===
By 1957 about 22,000 Russian Orthodox churches were active. But in 1959 Nikita Khrushchev initiated a campaign against the Russian Orthodox Church and forced the closure of about 12,000 churches. By 1985 fewer than 7,000 churches remained active.

The charitable and social work formerly done by ecclesiastical authorities was taken over by the state. As with all private property, Church owned property was confiscated into public use. The few places of worship left to the Church were legally viewed as state property which the government permitted the church to use. After the advent of state funded universal education, the Church was not permitted to carry on educational, instructional activity for children. For adults, only training for church-related occupations was allowed. Outside of sermons during the divine liturgy it could not instruct or evangelise to the faithful or its youth. Catechism classes, religious schools, study groups, Sunday schools and religious publications were all illegal. This persecution continued, even after the death of Stalin until the dissolution of the Soviet Union in 1991. This caused many religious tracts to be circulated as illegal literature or samizdat. Since the fall of the Soviet Union there have been many New-martyrs added as saints.

=== Serbia ===
In 1920, the Serbian Patriarchate was re-established, thus Metropolitan Dimitrije of Belgrade became the first head of the re-established patriarchate.

=== Bulgaria ===
In 1945 the Patriarch of Constantinople recognised the autocephaly of the Bulgarian Church. In 1950, the Holy Synod adopted a new Statute which paved the way for the Second restoration of the Patriarchate and in 1953, it elected the Metropolitan of Plovdiv, Cyril, Bulgarian Patriarch.

=== Romania ===
Romanian Orthodox Church was elevated to a patriarchate in 1925. On 1 November 1925, after a Synod was held, Metropolitan-Primate Miron Cristea of All Romania was named Patriarch of All Romania.

Patriarch Miron introduced reforms such as the Gregorian calendar to the church, including, briefly, the celebration of Easter on the same date as the Roman Catholic Church. This was opposed by various groups of traditionalists and Old Calendarists, especially in Moldavia, where Metropolitan Gurie Grosu of Bessarabia refused to accept the orders given by the Patriarchate.

=== Georgia ===
Following the overthrow of the Tsar Nicholas II in March 1917, Georgia's bishops unilaterally restored the autocephaly of the Georgian Orthodox Church on 25 March 1917. These changes were not accepted by the Russian Orthodox Church. After the Red Army invasion of Georgia in 1921, the Georgian Orthodox Church was subjected to intense harassment. Hundreds of churches were closed by the atheist government and hundreds of monks were killed during Joseph Stalin's purges. The independence of the Georgian Orthodox Church was finally recognized by the Russian Orthodox Church on 31 October 1943: this move was ordered by Stalin as part of the war-time more tolerant policy towards Christianity in the Soviet Union.

On 3 March 1990, the Ecumenical Patriarch of Constantinople recognized and approved the autocephaly of the Georgian Orthodox Church (which had in practice been exercised or at least claimed since the 5th century), as well as the Patriarchal honour of the Catholicos. Georgia's subsequent independence in 1991 saw a major revival in the fortunes of the Georgian Orthodox Church.

=== Greece ===
The 20th-century religious revival was led by the Zoë movement, which was founded in 1911. Based in Athens but operating in decentralized fashion, it reached a membership of laymen as well as some priests. The main activities include publications and the nationwide Sunday School movement in 7800 churches reaching 150,000 students. Zoë sponsored numerous auxiliaries and affiliated groups, including organizations for professional men, youth, parents, and young women nurses. A strong effort was made to circulate Bibles, illustrated novels, pamphlets, and other religious materials. A liturgical movement encouraged the laity to a greater awareness in the Eucharist, and more frequent Communion. Seminaries were built in the 20th century, but most of the graduates entered teaching rather than parish work. In 1920, only 800 of Greece's 4500 priests had any education beyond the elementary level. By 1959, out of 7000 priests no more than five percent had completed university and seminary training. Monastic life declined sharply, although it continued at remote Mount Athos. Routine church life was highly disrupted by the Second World War and subsequent civil war, with many churches burned, and hundreds of priests and monks killed by the Germans on the one hand or the Communists on the other.

=== Albania ===
After Albanian independence in 1912, Noli (who in 1924 would also be a political figure and prime minister of Albania), traveled to Albania where he played an important role in establishing the Orthodox Albanian Church. On 17 September 1922, the first Orthodox Congress convened at Berat formally laid the foundations of an Albanian Orthodox Church and declared its autocephaly. The Ecumenical Patriarchate of Constantinople recognized the independence or autocephaly of the Orthodox Albanian Church in 1937.

In 1967 Enver Hoxha closed down all churches and mosques in the country, and declared Albania the world's first atheist country. All expression of religion, public or private, was outlawed. Hundreds of priests and imams were killed or imprisoned.

In December 1990, Communist officials officially ended the 23-year long religious ban in Albania. Only 22 Orthodox priests remained alive. To deal with this situation, the Ecumenical Patriarch appointed Anastasios to be the Patriarchal Exarch for the Albanian Church. As Bishop of Androusa, Anastasios was dividing his time between his teaching duties at the University of Athens and the Archbishopric of Irinoupolis in Kenya, which was then going through a difficult patch, before his appointment. He was elected as Archbishop of Tirana, Durrës and Primate of Albania on 24 June 1992, and enthroned on 2 August 1992.

=== Cyprus ===
In 1950, Makarios III was elected Archbishop of Cyprus. While still Bishop of Kition he had demonstrated strong intellectual and national activity. In 1950 he organised the referendum on the Union (Enosis) between Cyprus and Greece. While archbishop he was the political leader of the EOKA liberation struggle in the years 1955–1959. The British exiled him to the Seychelles because of his activities.

In 1960, Archbishop Makarios III was elected President of the newly established republic of Cyprus. Disagreements of the other three bishops with Makarios lead to the 1972–73 Cypriot ecclesiastical coup attempt. Following the dethronement of the Bishops of Paphos, Kitium and Kyrenia for conspiring against Makarios, two new Bishoprics were created: the Bishopric of Limassol which was detached from the Bishopric of Kition, and the Bishopric of Morfou which was detached from the Bishopric of Kyrenia. The coup d'état of 15 July 1974, forced Archbishop Makarios III to leave the island. He returned in December 1974.

The coup d'état was followed by the Turkish invasion of 20 July 1974, which significantly affected the church and its flock: as 35% of Cyprus' territory came under Turkish occupation, hundreds of thousands of Orthodox Christians were displaced and those that could not or did not want to leave (20,000 initially) faced oppression. In Northern Cyprus, there are 514 churches, chapels and monasteries, many of which were converted to mosques, museums or abandoned.

=== Finland ===
Shortly after Finland declared independence from Russia in 1917, the Orthodox Church of Finland declared its autonomy from the Russian Orthodox Church. Finland's first constitution (1919) granted the Orthodox Church an equal status with the Lutheran Church of Finland.

In 1923, the Orthodox Church of Finland completely separated from the Russian Church, becoming an autonomous church affiliated with the Ecumenical Patriarchate of Constantinople. At the same time the Gregorian Calendar was adopted and changed the language of the liturgy from Church Slavonic to Finnish.

=== Crete ===
In 1962, the Ecumenical Patriarchate of Constantinople elevated the island of Crete's bishoprics to metropolises, and in 1967, the Metropolitan of Crete was promoted to Archbishop.

== Oriental Orthodoxy ==
=== Coptic Orthodox Church ===
In June 1968, Coptic Pope Cyril VI received the relics of Saint Mark the Evangelist, which had been taken from Alexandria to Venice over eleven centuries earlier. The relics were interred beneath the newly completed cathedral.

On Sunday, 2 January 2000, 21 Coptic Christians in Kosheh village in Upper (southern) Egypt, 450 kilometers south of Cairo, were massacred by Salafists. Christian properties were also burned. Later, a criminal court in Sohag governorate released all 89 defendants charged in the New Year's massacre in Kosheh without bail. Coptic Pope Shenouda III rejected the verdict openly, and told reporters, "We want to challenge this ruling. We don't accept it." As the court sentence could not be appealed, Coptic Pope Shenouda III said: "We will appeal this sentence before God."

=== Ethiopian Orthodox Tewahedo Church ===
The Coptic and Ethiopian churches reached an agreement on 13 July 1948, that led to autocephaly for the Ethiopian Church. Five bishops were immediately consecrated by the Coptic Pope Cyril VI of Alexandria and Patriarch of All Africa, empowered to elect a new patriarch for their church, and the successor to Qerellos IV would have the power to consecrate new bishops. This promotion was completed when Coptic Orthodox Pope Joseph II consecrated an Ethiopian-born Archbishop, Abuna Basilios, 14 January 1951. Then in 1959, Pope Cyril VI crowned Basilios as the first Patriarch of Ethiopia.

Basilios died in 1971, and was succeeded that year by Tewophilos. With the fall of Emperor Haile Selassie in 1974, the Ethiopian Orthodox Tewahedo Church was disestablished as the state church. The new Marxist government began nationalizing property (including land) owned by the church. Tewophilos was arrested in 1976 by the Marxist Derg military junta, and secretly executed in 1979. The government ordered the church to elect a new Patriarch, and Takla Haymanot was enthroned. The Coptic Orthodox Church refused to recognize the election and enthronement of Tekle Haymanot on the grounds that the Synod of the Ethiopian Church had not removed Tewophilos and that the government had not publicly acknowledged his death, and he was thus still the legitimate Patriarch of Ethiopia. Formal relations between the two churches were halted, although they remained in communion with each other.

Tekle Haymanot proved to be much less accommodating to the Derg regime than it had expected, and so when the patriarch died in 1988, a new patriarch with closer ties to the regime was sought. The Archbishop of Gondar, a member of the Derg-era Ethiopian Parliament, was elected and enthroned as Abuna Merkorios. Following the fall of the Derg regime in 1991, and the coming to power of the EPRDF government, Merkorios abdicated under public and governmental pressure. The church then elected a new Patriarch, Paulos, who was recognized by the Coptic Pope of Alexandria.

=== Eritrean Orthodox Tewahedo Church ===
Following the independence of Eritrea as a nation in 1993, the Coptic Orthodox Church in 1994 appointed an Archbishop for the Eritrean Church, which in turn obtained autocephaly in 1998 with the reluctant approval of its mother synod. That same year, the first Eritrean patriarch was consecrated.

== Catholic–Orthodox dialogue ==
Over the last century, a number of moves have been made to reconcile the schism between the Catholic Church and the Eastern Orthodox churches. Although progress has been made, concerns over papal primacy and the independence of the smaller Orthodox churches has blocked a final resolution of the schism.

Some of the most difficult questions in relations with the ancient Eastern Churches concern some doctrine (i.e. Filioque, Scholasticism, functional purposes of asceticism, the essence of God, Hesychasm, Fourth Crusade, establishment of the Latin Empire, Uniatism to note but a few) as well as practical matters such as the concrete exercise of the claim to papal primacy and how to ensure that ecclesiastical union would not mean mere absorption of the smaller Churches by the Latin component of the much larger Catholic Church (the most numerous single religious denomination in the world), and the stifling or abandonment of their own rich theological, liturgical and cultural heritage.

The Joint International Commission for Theological Dialogue Between the Catholic Church and the Orthodox Church first met in Rhodes in 1980.

=== Uniate situation ===
At a meeting in Balamand, Lebanon in June 1993, the Joint International Commission for the Theological Dialogue between the Roman Catholic Church and the Orthodox Church, the delegates of the Eastern Orthodox Churches declared "...and that what has been called 'uniatism' can no longer be accepted either as a method to be followed nor as a model of the unity our Churches are seeking".

At the same time, the commission stated:

- Concerning the Eastern Catholic Churches, it is clear that they, as part of the Catholic Communion, have the right to exist and to act in response to the spiritual needs of their faithful.
- The Oriental Catholic Churches who have desired to re-establish full communion with the See of Rome and have remained faithful to it, have the rights and obligations which are connected with this communion.

=== Other moves toward reconciliation ===
In June 1995, Patriarch Bartholomew I, who was elected as the 273rd Ecumenical Patriarch of Constantinople in October 1991, visited the Vatican for the first time when he joined in the historic inter-religious day of prayer for peace at Assisi. Pope John Paul II and Bartholomew I explicitly stated their mutual "desire to relegate the excommunications of the past to oblivion and to set out on the way to re-establishing full communion".

In May 1999, John Paul II visited Romania, becoming the first pope since the Great Schism to visit an Eastern Orthodox country. Upon greeting John Paul II, the Romanian Patriarch Teoctist stated: "The second millennium of Christian history began with a painful wounding of the unity of the Church; the end of this millennium has seen a real commitment to restoring Christian unity." Pope John Paul II visited other heavily Orthodox areas such as Ukraine, despite lack of welcome at times, and he said that healing the divisions between Western and Eastern Christianity was one of his fondest wishes.

== Catholic–Protestant dialogue ==
In 1966, the Archbishop of Canterbury, Michael Ramsey, made an official visit to Pope Paul VI and, in the following year, the Anglican-Roman Catholic International Commission was established. Its first project focused on the authority of scripture. The commission has since produced nine agreed statements. Phase One of ARCIC ended in 1981 with the publication of a final report, Elucidations on Authority in the Church.

With respect to Catholic relations with Protestant communities, certain commissions were established to foster dialogue, and documents have been produced aimed at identifying points of doctrinal unity, such as the Joint Declaration on the Doctrine of Justification produced with the Lutheran World Federation in 1999.

== Catholic-Coptic dialogue ==
Coptic Orthodox observers attended the Second Vatican Council, and Rome returned relics of St. Mark to Alexandria. Pope Paul VI met with Pope Shenouda III in the Vatican on 9–13 May 1973, the first such meeting between Bishop of Rome and Coptic Patriarch of Alexandria in over 1,000 years, during which they signed the landmark Joint Christological Declaration.

== Timeline ==
20th-century timeline
- 1901 – Nazarene John Diaz goes to Cape Verde Islands; Maude Cary sails for Morocco; Oriental Missionary Society founded by Charles Cowman (his wife is the compiler of popular devotional book Streams in the Desert); Missionary James Chalmers killed and eaten by cannibals in Papua New Guinea
- 1902 – Swiss members of the Plymouth Brethren Christian Missions in Many Lands (CMML) enter Laos; California Yearly Meeting of Friends opens work in Guatemala
- 1903 – Church of the Nazarene enters Mexico
- 1904 – Premillennialist theologian William Eugene Blackstone begins teaching that the world has already been evangelized, citing Acts 2:5, 8:4, Mark 16:20 and Colossians 1:23
- 1904 – Welsh revival
- 1905 – Gunnerius Tollefsen is converted at a Salvation Army meeting under the preaching of Samuel logan brengle. Later he would become a missionary to the Belgian Congo and then first mission secretary of the Norwegian Pentecostal movement.
- 1905 French law on the separation of Church and State
- 1906 – The Evangelical Alliance Mission (TEAM) opens work in Venezuela with T. J. Bach and John Christiansen
- 1906 – Albert Schweitzer publishes The Quest of the Historical Jesus (English translation 1910)
- 1906 – Biblia Hebraica
- 1906–1909 – Azusa Street Revival in Los Angeles, California begins modern Pentecostal movement
- 1907 – Massive revival meetings in Korea; Harmon Schmelzenbach sails for Africa; Presbyterians and Methodists open Union Theological Seminary in Manila, Philippines; Bolivian Indian Mission founded by George Allen
- 1907–1912 – Nicholas of Japan, Archbishop of Japanese Orthodox Church
- 1908 – Gospel Missionary Union opens work in Colombia with Charles Chapman and John Funk; Assemblies of God enter Rome and southern Italy as well as Egypt.
- 1909 – Pentecostal movement reaches Chile through ministry of American Methodist Willis Hoover
- 1909 – Scofield Reference Bible
- 1909–1911 – The Rosicrucian Fellowship, an international association of Esoteric Christian mystics, founded at Mount Ecclesia
- 1910 – Edinburgh Missionary Conference held in Scotland, presided over by John Mott, beginning modern Protestant ecumenical cooperation in missions
- 1910 – Edinburgh Missionary Conference launches modern missions movement and modern ecumenical movement; 5-point statement of the Presbyterian General Assembly, also used by Fundamentalists
- 1910 – West China Union University established in Chengdu by four Protestant mission societies, namely, the American Baptist Foreign Mission Society, the American Methodist Episcopal Mission, the Canadian Methodist Mission, and the Friends' Foreign Mission Association
- 1910–1915 – The Fundamentals, a 12-volume collection of essays by 64 British and American scholars and preachers, a foundation of Fundamentalism
- 1911 – C. T. Studd establishes Heart of Africa Mission, now called WEC International.
- 1911 – Christian & Missionary Alliance enters Cambodia and Vietnam
- 1912 – Conference of British Missionary Societies formed; International Review of Missions begins publication.
- 1913 – African-American Eliza George sails from New York for Liberia; William Whiting Borden dies in Egypt while preparing to proselytize to Muslims in China.
- 1913 – Catholic Encyclopedia
- 1914 – Large-scale revival movement in Uganda; C. T. Studd reports a revival movement in the Congo
- 1914 – Seventh-day Adventist missionaries Francis Arthur Allum and Merritt C. Warren start work in Sichuan
- 1914 – Iglesia ni Cristo incorporated in the Philippines
- 1914 – Welsh Church Act 1914
- 1914–1918 – World War I numerous missionaries in Africa and Asia in British, French, German and Belgian colonies are expelled or detained for the duration of the war, if their nation was at war with the colonial authority
- 1915 – Founded in 1913 in Nanjing, China as a women's Christian college, Ginling College officially opens with eight students and six teachers. It was supported by four missions: the Northern Baptists, the Christian Church (Disciples of Christ), the Methodists, and the Presbyterians.
- 1915–1917 – Armenian genocide
- 1916 – Rhenish missionaries are forced to leave Ondjiva in southern Angola under pressure from the Portuguese authorities and Chief Mandume of the Kwanyama. By then, four congregations existed with a confessing membership of 800.
- 1916 – And did those feet in ancient time
- 1916 – Father Divine founded International Peace Mission movement
- 1917 – Interdenominational Foreign Mission Association (IFMA) founded.
- 1917 – Seventh-day Adventist Church's Szechwan Mission founded.
- 1917 – Heinrich Hansen publishes Lutheran Evangelical Catholic theses Stimuli et Clavi
- 1917 – Miracle of the Sun an event that was witnessed by as many as 100,000 people on 13 October 1917, in the Cova da Iria fields near Fátima, Portugal. How the Sun Danced at Midday at Fátima
- 1917 – Our Lady appears to 3 young people, in Fátima, Portugal. They were Jacinta Marto, Tiago Veloso and Lúcia (Sister Lucia)
- 1917 – True Jesus Church founded in Beijing
- 1917 – Restitution of the Moscow Patriarchy with Tikhon as patriarch
- 1918 – James L. Barton, head of the American Board of Commissioners for Foreign Missions, asked missionaries who had served in the Ottoman Empire for detailed reports of the horrors they had witnessed of the Armenian genocide
- 1918 – Execution of Holy Martyrs of Russia, including the last tsar, Nicholas II, and his wife, Alexandra Feodorovna
- 1919 – The Union Version of Bible in Chinese is published; Gospel Missionary Union enters Sudan.
- 1919 – Karl Barth's Commentary on Romans is published, critiquing Liberal Christianity and beginning the neo-orthodox movement
- 1920 – Baptist Mid-Missions formed by William Haas; Church of the Nazarene enters Syria; Columbans enter Australia and New Zealand
- 1920 – The Ecclesia, an Esoteric Christian Temple, was erected and dedicated on Christmas day (25 December)
- 1921 – Founding of International Missionary Council (IMC); Norwegian Mission Council formed; Columbans enter China
- 1921 – Oxford Group founded at Oxford
- 1922 – Nazarenes enter Mozambique
- 1923 – Scottish missionaries begin work in British Togoland
- 1923 – Aimee Semple McPherson built Angelus Temple
- 1924 – Bible Churchman's Missionary Society opens work in Upper Burma; Baptist Mid-Missions begins work in Venezuela
- 1925 – E. Stanley Jones, Methodist missionary to India, writes The Christ of the Indian Road.
- 1925 – Scopes Trial, caused division among Fundamentalists
- 1925 – United Church of Canada formed
- 1926 – Dawson Trotman, founder of the Navigators, is converted through Bible verses he had memorized
- 1926 – Father Charles Coughlin's first radio broadcast
- 1926–1929 – Cristero War in Mexico, the Constitution of 1917 brought persecution of Christian practices and anti-clerical laws – approximately 4,000 Catholic Priests were expelled, assassinated or executed
- 1927 – East African revival movement (Balokole) emerges in Rwanda and moves across several other countries.
- 1927 – Pope Pius XI decrees Comma Johanneum open to dispute
- 1928 – Cuba Bible Institute (West Indies Mission) opens; Jerusalem Conference of International Missionary Council; foundation of Borneo Evangelical Mission by Hudson Southwell, Frank Davidson and Carey Tolley.
- 1929 – Christian & Missionary Alliance enters East Borneo (Indonesia) and Thailand.
- 1929 – Lateran Treaty signed containing three agreements between kingdom of Italy and the papacy.
- 1930 – Christian & Missionary Alliance starts work among Baouli tribe in the Côte d'Ivoire
- 1930 – Rastafari movement founded
- 1931 – HCJB radio station started in Quito, Ecuador by Clarence Jones; Baptist Mid-Missions enters Liberia.
- 1931 – Franciscan missionary the Venerable Gabriele Allegra arrives in Hunan China from Italy to start translating the Bible Studium Biblicum OFM
- 1931 – Christ the Redeemer (statue) in Rio de Janeiro, Brazil
- 1931 – Jehovah's Witnesses founded see 1884 for more information.
- 1932 – Assemblies of God open mission work in Colombia; Laymen's Missionary Inquiry report published
- 1932 – Our Lady appears to five school children in Beauraing, Belgium as Lady Virgin of the Poor index
- 1933 – Gladys Aylward (subject of movie "The Inn of the Sixth Happiness") arrives in China; Columbans enter Korea
- 1933 – Catholic Worker Movement founded
- 1934 – William Cameron Townsend begins the Summer Institute of Linguistics; Columbans enter Japan
- 1934 – Herbert W. Armstrong founded Radio Church of God
- 1935 – Frank C. Laubach, American missionary to the Philippines, begins promoting his "Each one teach one" literacy program in other countries. Laubach's work has been used in more than 100 countries to teach 100 million people to read.
- 1935 – Billy Sunday, early U.S. radio evangelist
- 1935 – Gunnar Rosendal publishes Lutheran High Church manifesto Kyrklig förnyelse
- 1935 – Dr. Frank C. Laubach, known as "The Apostle to the Illiterates." working in the Philippines, developed a literacy program that continues to teach millions of people to read.
- 1935 – Rahlf's critical edition of the Koine Greek Septuagint
- 1936 – With the outbreak of civil war in Spain, missionaries are forced to leave that country.
- 1937 – After expulsion of missionaries from Ethiopia by Italian invaders, widespread revival erupts among Protestant (SIM) churches in south; Child Evangelism Fellowship (CEF) founded by Jesse Irvin Overholzer Overholzer
- 1938 – West Indies Mission enters Dominican Republic; Church Missionary Society forced out of Egypt; Madras World Missionary Conference held; Dr. Orpha Speicher completes construction of Reynolds Memorial Hospital in central India
- 1938 – Tripura Baptist Christian Union was established at Laxmilunga, Tripura.
- 1938 – First Debbarma Christian, Manindra Debbarma, was baptized at Agartala.
- 1939 – A sick missionary, Joy Ridderhof, makes a recording of gospel songs and a message and sends it into the mountains of Honduras. It is the beginning of Gospel Recordings.
- 1939 – Southern and Northern US branches of the Methodist Episcopal Church, along with the Methodist Protestant Church reunite to form The Methodist Church. Slavery had divided the church in the 19th century.
- 1939–1945 – World War II numerous missionaries in Africa and Asia in British, French and Belgian colonies are expelled or detained for the duration of the war, if their nation was at war with the colonial authority
- 1940 – Marianna Slocum begins translation work in Mexico; Military police in Japan arrest the executive officers of the Salvation Army
- 1940 – Monumento Nacional de Santa Cruz del Valle de los Caidos, world's largest cross, 152.4 meters high
- 1941 – The steamship Zamzam, sailing from New York with 140 missionaries bound for various mission fields in Africa, is sunk by the Germans. All the missionary passengers would be saved.
- 1942 – William Cameron Townsend founds Wycliffe Bible Translators; New Tribes mission founded with a vision to reach the tribal peoples of Bolivia
- 1942 – National Association of Evangelicals founded\
- 1943 – Five missionaries with New Tribes Mission go missing in Bolivia; 11 American Baptist missionaries beheaded in the Philippines by Japanese soldiers
- 1944 – Missionaries return to Suki, Papua New Guinea after withdrawal of the Japanese military
- 1945 – Mission Aviation Fellowship formed; Far East Broadcasting Company (FEBC) founded; Evangelical Foreign Missions Association formed by denominational mission boards.
- 1945 – The Venerable Gabriele Allegra establishes the Studium Biblicum Franciscanum in Beijing Studium Biblicum OFM
- 1945 – Dietrich Bonhoeffer is executed by the Nazis
- 1945 – Ludwig Müller
- 1945 – On the Feast of the Annunciation, Our Lady appears to a simple woman, Ida Peerdeman, in Amsterdam. This was the first of 56 appearances as "Our Lady of All Nations" The Lady of All Nations – Familie Mariens Marian apparition, which took place between 1945 and 1959.
- 1945 – The Nag Hammadi library is discovered.
- 1946 – First Inter-Varsity missionary convention (now called "Urbana"); United Bible Societies formed
- 1946–1952 – Revised Standard Version, revision of AV "based on consonantal Hebrew text" for OT and best available texts for NT, done in response to changes in English usage
- 1947 – Conservative Baptist Foreign Mission Society begins work among the Senufo people in the Côte d'Ivoire l.
- 1947 – Dead Sea Scrolls discovered
- 1947 – Oral Roberts founded Evangelistic Association
- 1947 – Uneasy Conscience of Modern Fundamentalism by Carl F. H. Henry, a landmark of Evangelicalism versus Fundamentalism in US
- 1948 – Alfredo del Rosso merges his Italian Holiness Mission with the Church of the Nazarene, thus opening Nazarene work on the European continent; Southern Baptist Convention adopts program calling for the tripling of the number of missionaries (achieved by 1964)
- 1948 – Declaration of the Establishment of the State of Israel, see also Christian Zionism
- 1948 – World Council of Churches is founded
- 1949 – Southern Baptist Mission board opens work in Venezuela, Mary Tripp sent out by CEF Child Evangelism Fellowship to the Netherlands.
- 1949 – evangelist Billy Graham preaches his first Los Angeles crusade
- 1950 – Paul Orjala arrives in Haiti; radio station 4VEH, owned by East and West Indies Bible Mission, starts broadcasting from near Cap-Haïtien, Haiti
- 1950 – Assumption of Mary decreed by Pope Pius XII
- 1950 – Missionaries of Charity founded by Mother Teresa
- 1950 – New World Translation of the Christian Greek Scriptures released
- 1951 – World Evangelical Alliance organized; Bill and Vonette Bright create Campus Crusade for Christ at UCLA; Alaska Missions is founded (later to be renamed InterAct Ministries).
- 1951 – Campus Crusade for Christ founded at UCLA
- 1951 – Bishop Fulton Sheen (1919–1979) debuts his television program Life is Worth Living on the DuMont Network. His half-hour lecture program on Roman Catholic theology remained the number one show on U.S. television for its time slot, winning several Emmys until Sheen ended the program in 1957.
- 1951 – The Last Temptation a fictional account of the life of Jesus written by Nikos Kazantzakis, wherein Christ's divinity is juxtaposed with his humanity, is published, and promptly banned in many countries.
- 1952 – Trans World Radio founded
- 1952 – C. S. Lewis' Mere Christianity
- 1952 – Novum Testamentum Graece, critical edition of Greek NT, basis of modern translations
- 1953 – Walter Trobisch, who would publish I loved a girl in 1962, begins pioneer missionary work in Tchollire, northern Cameroon.
- 1954 – Mennonite Board of Missions and Charities opens work in Cuba; Argentina Revival breaks out during Tommy Hicks crusade; Augustinians re-established in Japan; Columbans enter Chile
- 1954 – Unification Church founded under the name Holy Spirit Association for the Unification of World Christianity, acronymed HSA-UWC.
- 1954 – U.S. Pledge of Allegiance modified by act of Congress from "one nation, indivisible" to "one nation under God, indivisible"
- 1955 – Donald McGavran publishes Bridges of God; Dutch missionary "Brother Andrew" makes first of many Bible smuggling trips into Communist Eastern Europe;
- 1956 – U.S. missionaries Jim Elliot, Pete Fleming, Edward McCully, Nate Saint, and Roger Youderian are killed by Huaorani Indians in eastern Ecuador. (See Operation Auca)
- 1956 – Anchor Bible Series
- 1956 – In God We Trust designated U.S. national motto
- 1956 – The Ten Commandments
- 1957 – East Asia Christian Conference (EACC) founded at Prapat, Sumatra, Indonesia.
- 1957 – United Church of Christ founded by ecumenical union of Congregationalists and Evangelical & Reformed, representing Calvinists and Lutherans
- 1957 – English translation of Walter Bauer's Wörterbuch ...: A Greek-English Lexicon of the New Testament and Other Early Christian Literature, University of Chicago Press
- 1958 – Rochunga Pudaite completes translation of Bible into Hmar language (India) and was appointed the leader of the Indo-Burma Pioneer Mission; Missionaries Elisabeth Elliot and Rachel Saint make first peaceful contact with the Huaorani tribe in Ecuador.
- 1958 – Sedevacantism
- 1959 – Radio Lumiere founded in Haiti by West Indies Mission (now World Team); Josephine Makil becomes the first African-American to join Wycliffe Bible Translators; Feba Radio founded in UK.
- 1959 – Family Radio founded
- 1960 – Kenneth Strachan starts Evangelism-in-Depth in Central America; 18,000 people in Morocco reply to newspaper ad by Gospel Missionary Union offering free correspondence course on Christianity; Loren Cunningham founds Youth with a Mission; The Asia Evangelistic Fellowship (AEF), one of the largest Asian indigenous missionary organisations, is launched in Singapore by G. D. James Asia Evangelistic Fellowship
- 1961 – International Christian radio stations now number 30.
- 1961 – Christian Broadcasting Network founded
- 1961 – New World Translation of the Holy Scriptures
- 1962 – Don Richardson goes to Sawi tribe in Papua New Guinea; Operation Mobilisation founded in Mexico by George Verwer
- 1962 – Engel v. Vitale, first U.S. Supreme Court decision against School prayer
- 1962–1965 – Catholic Second Vatican Council, announced by Pope John XXIII in 1959, produced 16 documents which became official Roman Catholic teaching after approval by the Pope, purpose to renew "ourselves and the flocks committed to us"
- 1963 – Theological Education by Extension movement launched in Guatemala by Ralph Winter and James Emery.
- 1963 – Martin Luther King Jr. leads a civil rights march in Washington, D.C.
- 1963 – Oral Roberts University founded
- 1963 – campaign by Madalyn Murray O'Hair results in U.S. Supreme Court ruling prohibiting reading of Bible in public schools
- 1964 – In separate incidents, rebels in the Congo kill missionaries Paul Carlson and Irene Ferrel as well as brutalizing missionary doctor Helen Roseveare; Carlson is featured on 4 December Time magazine cover; Hans von Staden of the Dorothea Mission proposes to Patrick Johnstone that he write the book now titled Operation World
- 1965 – Rousas John Rushdoony founds Chalcedon Foundation
- 1965 – Reginald H. Fuller's The Foundations of New Testament Christology
- 1966 – Red Guards destroy churches in China; Berlin Congress on Evangelism; Missionaries expelled from Burma; God's Smuggler published
- 1966 – Raymond E. Brown's Commentary on the Gospel of John
- 1967 – All foreign missionaries expelled from Guinea.
- 1968 – The Studium Biblicum Translation of the Bible is published in Chinese Studium Biblicum OFM by the Venerable Gabriele Allegra
- 1968 – Wu Yung and others form the Chinese Missions Overseas to send out missionaries from Taiwan to do cross-cultural ministry; Augustinian order re-established in India
- 1968 – United Methodist Church formed with union of Methodist Church & Evangelical United Brethren Church, becoming the largest Methodist/Wesleyan church in the world
- 1968 – Zeitoun, Egypt, a bright image of the Virgin Mary as Our Lady of Zeitoun was seen over the Coptic Orthodox Church of Saint Demiana for over a 3-year period. Over six million Egyptians and foreigners saw the image, including Copts, Eastern Orthodox, Roman Catholic, Protestants, Muslims, Jews and people of no particular faith.
- 1969 – OMF International begins "industrial evangelism" to Taiwan's factory workers
- 1970 – Frankfurt Declaration on Mission; Operation Mobilisation launches MV Logos ship; Abp. Makarios III (Mouskos) of Cyprus baptizes 10,000 into the Orthodox Church in Kenya.
- 1970 – Mass of Paul VI replaces Tridentine Mass
- 1970 – The Late, Great Planet Earth futurist book by Hal Lindsey
- 1970s The Jesus movement takes hold in the U.S. One-way.org
- 1971 – Gustavo Gutierrez publishes A Theology of Liberation.
- 1971 – Liberty University founded by Jerry Falwell
- 1971 – New American Standard Bible
- 1971 – The Exorcist, a novel of demonic possession and the mysteries of the Catholic faith, is published.
- 1972 – American Society of Missiology founded with journal Missiology.
- 1973 – Services by Billy Graham attract four and a half million people in six cities of Korea; first All-Asa Mission Consultation convenes in Seoul, Korea with 25 delegates from 14 countries.
- 1973 – New International Version of the Bible is first published (revised in 1978,1984), using a variety of Greek texts, Masoretic Hebrew texts, and current English style
- 1973 – Trinity Broadcasting Network founded
- 1973 – On 12 June 1973, near the city of Akita, Our Lady appears to Sister Agnes Katsuko Sasagawa. Three messages were given to Sr. Agnes over a period 5 months. Our Lady of Akita.
- 1974 – Missiologist Ralph Winter talks about "hidden" or unreached peoples at Lausanne Congress of World Evangelism. Lausanne Covenant is written and ratified
- 1974 – Jim Bakker founds PTL television ministry
- 1975 – Missionaries Armand Doll and Hugh Friberg imprisoned in Mozambique after communist takeover of government
- 1975 – Bruce Metzger's Textual Commentary on the Greek New Testament
- 1976 – U.S. Center for World Mission founded in Pasadena, California; 1600 Chinese assemble in Hong Kong for the Chinese Congress on World Evangelization; Islamic World Congress calls for withdrawal of Christian missionaries; Peace Child by Don Richardson appears in Reader's Digest.
- 1976 – Anneliese Michel, Bavarian woman, underwent exorcism against demon possession
- 1977 – Evangelical Fellowship of India sponsors the All-India Congress on Mission and Evangelization.
- 1977 – Focus on the Family founded by James Dobson
- 1977 – New Perspective on Paul
- 1978 – LCWE Consultation on Gospel and Culture in Willowbank, Bermuda; Columbans enter Taiwan
- 1978 – Chicago Statement on Biblical Inerrancy
- 1978–2005 – Pope John Paul II, reaffirmed moral traditions (The Splendor of Truth)
- 1979 – Production of JESUS film commissioned by Bill Bright of Campus Crusade for Christ; Ted Fletcher founds Pioneers, a missionary agency with a focus on "unreached people groups"; Columban missionaries enter Pakistan at the request of the Bishop of Lahore
- 1979 – Jesus, most watched movie of all time according to New York Times
- 1979 – Moral Majority founded by Jerry Falwell
- 1979–1982 – New King James Version, complete revision of 1611 AV, updates archaisms while retaining style
- 1980 – Philippine Congress on Discipling a Whole Nation; Lausanne Congress on World Evangelism Conference in Pattaya.
- 1981 – Colombian terrorists kidnap and kill Wycliffe Bible Translator Chet Bitterman; Project Pearl: one million Bibles are delivered in a single night to thousands of waiting believers in China
- 1981 – Kibeho, Rwanda reported that Our Lady appeared to several teenagers telling them to pray to avoid "rivers of blood" Marian apparitions. This was an ominous foreshadowing of the Rwanda Genocide of 1994.
- 1981 – Mother Angelica launches EWTN, which grows to become one of the largest television networks in the world. The operation expands to radio in 1992.
- 1982 – Story on "The New Missionary" makes 27 December cover of Time magazine; Andes Evangelical Mission (formerly Bolivian Indian Mission) merges into SIM (formerly Sudan Interior Mission)
- 1982 – Chicago Statement on Biblical Hermeneutics
- 1983 – Missionary Athletes International, a global soccer ministry, founded by Tim Conrad
- 1984 – Founding of The Mission Society for United Methodists, a voluntary missionary sending agency within the United Methodist Church; re-branded in 2006 to The Mission Society; Founding of STEM (Short Term evangelical Mission teams) ministry by Roger Petersen signals the rising importance of Short-term missions groups
- 1985 – Howard Foltz founds Accelerating International Mission Strategies (AIMS)
- 1985 – E. P. Sanders' Jesus and Judaism
- 1985 – Jesus Seminar founded
- 1986 – Chicago Statement on Biblical Application
- 1987 – Second International Conference on Missionary Kids (MKs) held in Quito, Ecuador
- 1987 – Danvers Statement – Council on Biblical Manhood and Womanhood
- 1988 – Christian Coalition
- 1988 – The Last Temptation of Christ, directed by Martin Scorsese, is released by Universal Pictures, and promptly attacked as heretical by organized Christian and Catholic groups.
- 1988 – The celebration of 1000 years since the baptism of Kievan Rus throughout the R.O.C.
- 1989 – Adventures in Missions (AIM) Short-term missions agency founded by Seth Barnes; Lausanne II, a world missions conference; concept of 10/40 Window emerges; "Ee-Taow" video released by New Tribes Mission
- 1989 – New Revised Standard Version
- 1990 – American Center for Law and Justice founded
- 1991 – The Marxist government of Ethiopia is overthrown and missionaries are able to return to that country
- 1991 – John P. Meier's series A Marginal Jew: Rethinking the Historical Jesus, v. 1
- 1992 – World Gospel Mission (National Holiness Missionary Society) starts work in Uganda
- 1992 – Catechism of the Catholic Church
- 1993 – Trans World Radio starts broadcasting from a 250,000-watt shortwave transmitter in Russia
- 1994 – Liibaan Ibraahim Hassan, a convert to Christianity in Somalia, is martyred by Islamic militants in the capital city of Mogadishu;
- 1994 – "Evangelicals & Catholics Together"
- 1994 – Answers in Genesis founded by Ken Ham
- 1994 – Porvoo Communion
- 1994, 3 July – Glorification of St. John of Shanghai and San Francisco
- 1995 – Missionary Don Cox abducted in Quito, Ecuador
- 1996 – Nazarenes enter Hungary, Kazakhstan, Pakistan
- 1996 – Cambridge Declaration – Alliance of Confessing Evangelicals
- 1997 – Foreign Mission Board and Home Mission Board of Southern Baptist Convention become the International Mission Board and North American Mission Board with ten thousand missionaries
- 1997, 5–10 March World Council of Churches: Towards a Common Date for Easter, see also Reform of the date of Easter
- 1998, 6 April PBS Frontline: From Jesus to Christ
- 1999 – Trans World Radio goes on the air from Grigoriopol (Moldova) using a 1-million-watt AM transmitter; Veteran Australian missionary Graham Stuart Staines and his two sons are burned alive by Hindu extremists as they are sleeping in a car in eastern India.
- 1999 – International House of Prayer in Kansas City begins non-stop 24/7 continual prayer
- 1999 – Gospel of Jesus Christ – An Evangelical Celebration; a consensus Gospel endorsed by various evangelical leaders including J.I. Packer, John Ankerberg, Jerry Falwell, Thomas C. Oden, R.C. Sproul, Wayne Grudem, Charles Swindoll, et al.
- 1999, 31 October signing of the Joint Declaration on the Doctrine of Justification between the Lutheran World Federation and the Catholic Church.
- 1 January 2000 – The Church of Sweden is separated from the Swedish state.
- 2000 – Asia College of Ministry (ACOM), a ministry of Asia Evangelistic Fellowship (AEF), was launched by Jonathan James, to train national missionaries in Asia.
- 2000 – Our Lady appears in Assiut, Upper Egypt; phenomena associated to Our Lady reported again, in 2006, in a Church at the same location during the Mass. Local Coptic priests and then the Coptic Orthodox Church of Assiut issue statements in 2000 and 2006, respectively

== See also ==
- History of Christianity
- History of Eastern Orthodox Churches in the 20th century
- History of Protestantism
- Mormonism in the 20th century
- History of the Roman Catholic Church#World War II
- History of the Eastern Orthodox Church
- History of Christian theology#Modern Christian theology
- History of Oriental Orthodoxy
- Role of the Roman Catholic Church in civilization
- Timeline of Christianity#19th century
- Timeline of Christian missions#1900 to 1949
- Timeline of the Roman Catholic Church#20th century
- List of 20th-century religious leaders
- Chronological list of saints and blesseds in the 20th century

== Notes ==
History of Christianity: Modern Christianity
Preceded by: Christianity in the 19th century / 20th century / Followed by: Christianity in the 21st century
BC	C1	C2	C3	C4	C5	C6	C7	C8	C9	C10
C11	C12	C13	C14	C15	C16	C17	C18	C19	C20	C21
