= Catholic Church in the 20th century =

The Roman Catholic Church in the 20th century entered into a period of renewal, responding to the challenge of increasing secularization of Western society and persecution resulting from great social unrest and revolutions in several countries. A major event in the period was the Second Vatican Council, which took place between 1962 and 1965. The church instituted reforms, especially in the 1970s after the conclusion of the Council, to modernize practices and positions. On taking office part way through the Council, Pope Paul VI referred to "an impatient struggle for renewal".

Catholic social teaching, rooted in the 1891 encyclical letter Rerum novarum by Pope Leo XIII, evolved during this period. Rerum novarum addressed the dignity and rights of workers against the backdrop of the Industrial Revolution. It advocates for fair labor conditions, living wages, and the right to form trade unions, establishing a framework that balances the rejection of socialism with a critique of unchecked capitalism. Subsequent teachings, like Quadragesimo anno and the works of Pius XII, expand these principles, emphasizing solidarity, subsidiarity, and the moral dimensions of economic life. This body of teaching continues to evolve, addressing modern social, economic, and technological issues while advocating for justice and the dignity of all individuals.

In this period, Catholic missionaries in the Far East worked to improve education and health care, while evangelizing peoples and attracting followers in China, Taiwan, Korea, and Japan.

== Leadership ==
Popes Leo XIII, Pius X, Benedict XV, Pius XI, Pius XII, John XXIII, Paul VI, John Paul I and John Paul II led the church during these years.

Pope Pius X (1903–1914) renewed the independence of papal office by abolishing the veto of Catholic powers in papal elections, and his successors Benedict XV (1914–1922) and Pius XI (1922–1939) concluded the modern independence of the Vatican State within Italy. Benedict XV was elected at the outbreak of the First World War. He attempted to mediate between the powers and established a Vatican relief office, to assist victims of the war and reunite families. The interwar Pope Pius XI modernized the papacy, appointing 40 indigenous bishops and concluding fifteen concordats, including the Lateran Treaty with Italy, which founded the Vatican City State.

== Catholic social teaching ==
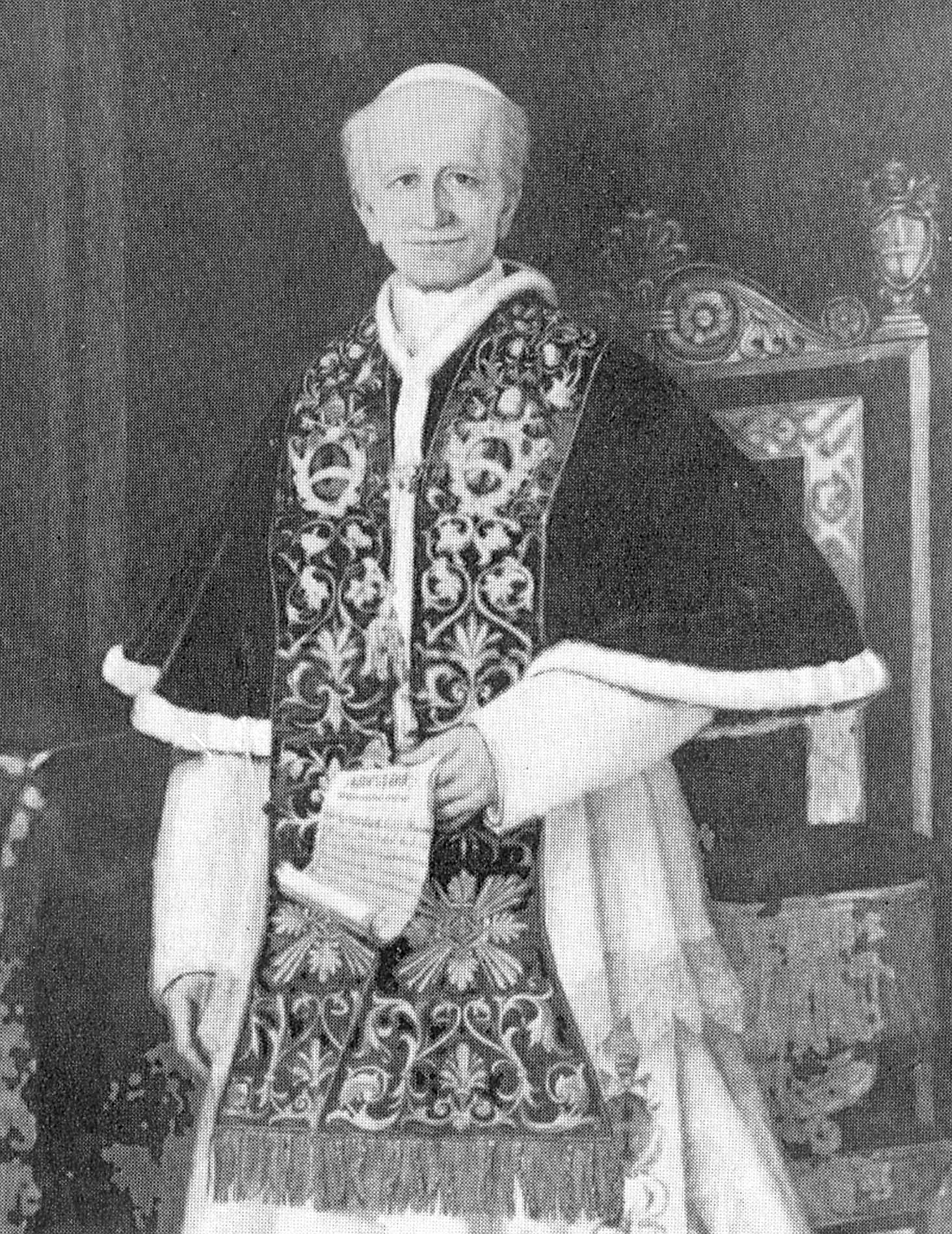
In 1891 Pope Leo XIII issued Rerum novarum in which the Church defined the dignity and rights of industrial workers.

=== Rerum novarum ===
The Industrial Revolution brought many concerns about the deteriorating working and living conditions of urban workers. Influenced by the German Bishop Wilhelm Emmanuel Freiherr von Ketteler, in 1891 Pope Leo XIII published the encyclical Rerum novarum, titled "On Capital and Labor". This encyclical set in context Catholic social teaching in terms that rejected socialism but advocated the regulation of working conditions. Rerum novarum argued for the establishment of a living wage and the right of workers to form trade unions.

In Rerum novarum, Leo set out the Catholic Church's response to the social instability and labor conflict that had arisen in the wake of industrialization and had led to the rise of socialism. The Pope taught that the role of the State is to promote social justice through the protection of rights, while the Church must speak out on social issues in order to teach correct social principles and ensure class harmony. He restated the Church's long-standing teaching regarding the crucial importance of private property rights, but recognised, in one of the best-known passages of the encyclical, that the free operation of market forces must be tempered by moral considerations:

Let the working man and the employer make free agreements, and in particular let them agree freely as to the wages; nevertheless, there underlies a dictate of natural justice more imperious and ancient than any bargain between man and man, namely, that wages ought not to be insufficient to support a frugal and well-behaved wage-earner. If through necessity or fear of a worse evil the workman accept harder conditions because an employer or contractor will afford him no better, he is made the victim of force and injustice.

Rerum novarum is remarkable for its vivid depiction of the plight of the late 19th-century urban poor and for its condemnation of unrestricted capitalism. Among the remedies it prescribed were the formation of trade unions and the introduction of collective bargaining, particularly as an alternative to state intervention. Rerum novarum also recognized that the poor have a special status in consideration of social issues: the modern Catholic principle of the "preferential option for the poor" and the notion that God is on the side of the poor found their first expression in this document.

=== Quadragesimo anno ===
Forty years after Rerum novarum, and more than a year into the Great Depression, Pope Pius XI issued Quadragesimo anno, subtitled "On Reconstruction of the Social Order". Released on 15 May 1931, this encyclical expanded on Rerum novarum, noting the positive effect of the earlier document but pointing out that the world had changed significantly since Pope Leo's time.

Unlike Leo, who addressed mainly the condition of workers, Pius XI concentrated on the ethical implications of the social and economic order. He called for the reconstruction of the social order based on the principle of solidarity and subsidiarity. He also noted major dangers for human freedom and dignity, arising from both unrestrained capitalism and totalitarian communism.

Pius XI reiterated Leo's defence of private property rights and collective bargaining, and repeated his contention that blind economic forces cannot create a just society on their own:

Just as the unity of human society cannot be founded on an opposition of classes, so also the right ordering of economic life cannot be left to a free competition of forces. For from this source, as from a poisoned spring, have originated and spread all the errors of individualist economic teaching. Destroying through forgetfulness or ignorance the social and moral character of economic life, it held that economic life must be considered and treated as altogether free from and independent of public authority, because in the market, i.e., in the free struggle of competitors, it would have a principle of self direction which governs it much more perfectly than would the intervention of any created intellect. But free competition, while justified and certainly useful provided it is kept within certain limits, clearly cannot direct economic life ...

Quadragesimo Anno also supported state intervention to mediate labor-management conflicts (a reference to the economic system which Mussolini was attempting to establish in Italy at the time), and introduced the concept of subsidiarity into Catholic thought.

Prior to Quadragesimo anno, some Catholics had wondered whether Leo XIII's condemnation of radical left-wing politics in Rerum novarum extended only to outright communism or whether it included milder forms of socialism as well. Pius made it clear that non-communistic Socialism was included in the condemnation. The Catholic Church defined a distinctive position for itself between free-market capitalism on the right and statist socialism on the left.

=== Pius XII ===
The social teachings of Pope Pius XII repeat these teachings, and apply them in greater detail not only to workers and owners of capital, but also to other professions, such as politicians, educators, housewives, farmers bookkeepers, international organizations, and all aspects of life including the military. Going beyond Pius XI, he also defined social teachings in the areas of medicine, psychology, sport, TV, science, law and education. There is virtually no social issue, which Pius XII did not address and relate to the Christian faith. He was called "the Pope of Technology", for his willingness and ability to examine the social implications of technological advances. The dominant concern was the continued rights and dignity of the individual. With the beginning of the space age at the end of his pontificate, Pius XII explored the social implications of space exploration and satellites on the social fabric of humanity, asking for a new sense of community and solidarity in light of existing papal teachings on subsidiarity.

The Catholic Church exercised a prominent role in shaping America's labor movement. In 1933, two American Catholics, Dorothy Day and Peter Maurin, founded a new Catholic peace group, the Catholic Worker that would embody their ideals of pacifism, commitment to the poor, and to fundamental change in American society. They published a newspaper of the same name for years.

== Anti-clericalism ==
In Latin America, a succession of anti-clerical regimes came to power beginning in the 1830s. In the 1920s and 1930s, the Catholic Church was subjected to unprecedented persecution in Mexico, as well as in Europe in Spain and the Soviet Union. Pope Pius XI called this the "terrible triangle".

The "harsh persecution short of total annihilation of the clergy, monks, and nuns and other people associated with the Church", began in 1918 and continued well into the 1930s. The Civil War in Spain started in 1936, during which thousands of churches were destroyed, thirteen bishops and some 6,832 clergy and religious Spaniards were assassinated.

After the widespread Church persecutions in Mexico, Spain and the Soviet Union, Pius XI defined communism as the main adversary of the Catholic Church in his encyclical Divini Redemptoris issued on 19 March 1937. He blamed Western powers and media for a "conspiracy of silence" with respect to the persecutions carried out by Communist, Socialist and Fascist forces.

=== Mexico ===
In Mexico, the Calles Law eventually led to the "worst guerilla war in Latin American History", the Cristero War. Between 1926 and 1934, over 3,000 priests were exiled or assassinated. In an effort to prove that "God would not defend the Church", Calles ordered Church desecrations in which services were mocked, nuns were raped, and captured priests were shot.

Calles was eventually deposed. Despite the persecution, the Church in Mexico continued to grow. A 2000 census reported that 88 percent of Mexicans identify as Catholic.

=== Spain ===
During the Spanish Civil War, Spanish republicans and anarchists targeted priests and nuns as symbols of conservatism, murdering large numbers of them. Confiscation of Church properties and restrictions on people's religious freedoms have generally accompanied secularist and Marxist-leaning governmental reforms.

=== Soviet Union ===
Worried by the persecution of Christians in the Soviet Union, Pius XI mandated Berlin nuncio Eugenio Pacelli to work secretly on diplomatic arrangements between the Vatican and the Soviet Union. Pacelli negotiated food shipments for Russia, and met with Soviet representatives including Foreign Minister Georgi Chicherin, who rejected any kind of religious education, or the ordination of priests and bishops, but offered agreements without the points vital to the Vatican. Despite Vatican pessimism and a lack of visible progress, Pacelli continued the secret negotiations. Pius XI ordered them to be discontinued in 1927, because they generated no results and he believed they would be dangerous to the Church's standing, if made public.

The harsh persecution continued well into the 1930s. The Soviet government executed and exiled many clerics, monks and laymen, confiscating Church implements "for victims of famine", and closing many churches. Yet according to an official report based on the census of 1936, some 55% of Soviet citizens identified themselves openly as religious, while others possibly concealed their belief.

=== In other countries ===
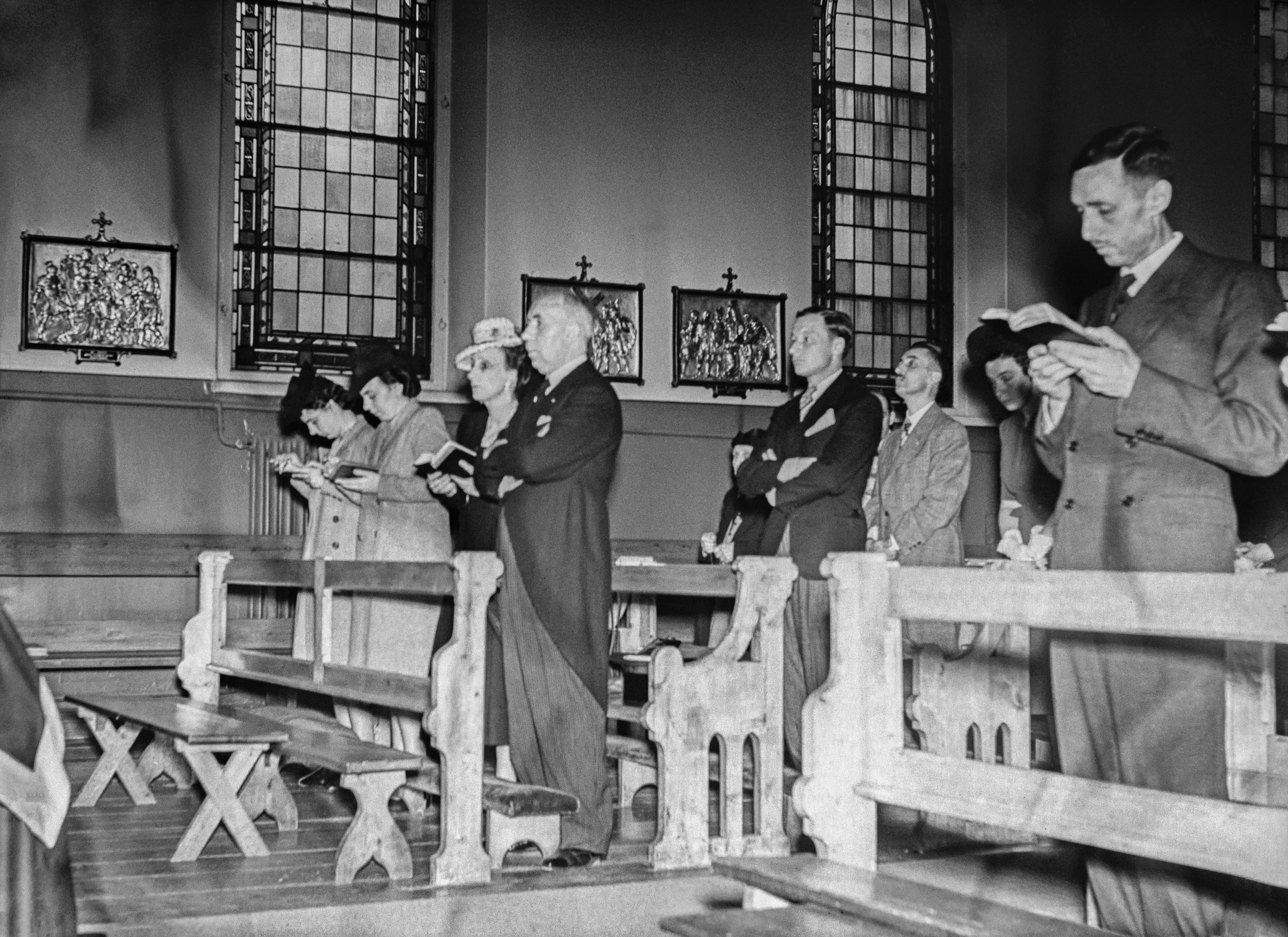
Memorial service at St. Henry's Cathedral in Helsinki, Finland on the French National Day in July 1941

==== Eastern Europe ====
Following the Soviet doctrine regarding the exercise of religion, postwar Communist governments in Eastern Europe severely restricted religious freedoms. Even though some clerics collaborated with the Communist regimes during their decades of power, from the late 1980s the Church's resistance and the leadership of Pope John Paul II have been credited with hastening the downfall in 1991 of communist governments across Europe.

==== China ====
The rise to power of the Communists in China of 1949 led to the expulsion of all foreign missionaries, "often after cruel and farcical 'public trials'." In an effort to further isolate Chinese Catholics, the new government created the Patriotic Church whose unilaterally appointed bishops were initially rejected by Rome but subsequently many were accepted. The Cultural Revolution of the 1960s encouraged gangs of teenagers to eliminate all religious establishments and convert their occupants into labourers. When Chinese churches eventually reopened, they remained under the control of the Communist party's Patriotic Church, and many Catholic pastors and priests continued to be sent to prison for refusing to renounce allegiance to Rome.

==== Latin America ====
General Juan Perón's Argentina and Fidel Castro's Cuba also engaged in extensive anti-clericalism, confiscating Catholic properties.

In 1954, under the regime of General Juan Perón, Argentina saw extensive destruction of churches, denunciations of clergy and confiscation of Catholic schools as Perón attempted to extend state control over national institutions. Cuba, under atheist Fidel Castro, succeeded in reducing the Church's ability to work by deporting the archbishop and 150 Spanish priests, discriminating against Catholics in public life and education and refusing to accept them as members of the Communist Party. The subsequent flight of 300,000 people from the island also helped to diminish the Church there.

== Response to authoritarianism ==
Authoritarianism or Fascism describes certain related political regimes in 20th-century Europe, especially the Nazi Germany of Hitler, the authoritarian Soviet Union, the Fascist Italy of Mussolini and the falangist Spain of Franco.

Pope Pius XI was moderately skeptical of Italian Fascism.

To Pope Pius XI, Dollfuss in Austria was the ideal politician realising Quadragesimo anno.

=== Nazi Germany ===
Popes Pius XI and Pius XII led the Church through the Second World War and early Cold War.

==== Pius XI ====
On 20 July 1933, the Vatican signed an agreement with Germany, the Reichskonkordat, partly in an effort to stop Nazi persecution of Catholic institutions.

When this escalated to include physical violence, Pope Pius XI issued the 1937 encyclical Mit brennender Sorge (With burning Concern, on the Church and the German Reich), the only Papal encyclical written in German. Drafted by the future Pope Pius XII, which was secretly printed in Italy then smuggled into Germany by motorcyclists. Most of the encyclical was read from the pulpits of all German Catholic churches: it denounce neo-paganism and exaltation of race, and called certain opinion leaders (Wortführern) mad prophets. According to some historians, it was the first denunciation of Nazism made by any major organization, however others criticize it as compromised by excessively diplomatic language.

"8. (DE:11.) ... Whoever follows that so-called pre-Christian Germanic conception of substituting a dark and impersonal destiny for the personal God, denies thereby the Wisdom and Providence of God who "Reacheth from end to end mightily, and ordereth all things sweetly" (Wisdom viii. 1). Neither is he a believer in God.

9. (DE:12) Whoever exalts race, or the people, or the State, or a particular form of State, or the depositories of power, or any other fundamental value of the human community - however necessary and honorable be their function in worldly things - whoever raises these notions above their standard value and divinizes them to an idolatrous level, distorts and perverts an order of the world planned and created by God; he is far from the true faith in God and from the concept of life which that faith upholds.

17. (DE:20) The peak of the revelation as reached in the Gospel of Christ is final and permanent. It knows no retouches by human hand; it admits no substitutes or arbitrary alternatives such as certain leaders (Wortführer) pretend to draw from the so-called myth of race and blood. ... Anyone who, in sacrilegious misapprehension of the fundamental differences between God and creature, between the God-man and the children of men, dares to place any mortal, even the greatest of all time, alongside Christ, or even above Him and against Him, must be told that he is a delusional prophet ...

— Mit Brennender Sorge, Pius XI

It obliquely criticized Hitler and condemned Nazi persecution and ideology and has been characterized by scholars as the "first great official public document to dare to confront and criticize Nazism" and "one of the greatest such condemnations ever issued by the Vatican."

According to Eamon Duffy, "The impact of the encyclical was immense" and the "infuriated" Nazis increased their persecution of Catholics and the Church by initiating a "long series" of persecution of clergy and other measures. Nazi persecution of the Church in Germany then began by "outright repression" and "staged prosecutions of monks for homosexuality, with the maximum of publicity." When Dutch bishops protested against deportation of Jews in the Netherlands, the Nazi's responded with even more severe measures.

==== Pius XII ====
Like his predecessors, Pius XII sought to publicly maintain Vatican neutrality in the War and established aid networks to help victims, but he secretly assisted the anti-Hitler resistance and shared intelligence with the Allies. Summi Pontificatus (1939), his first encyclical, expressed dismay at the 1939 invasion of Poland by Nazi Germany and the Soviet Union, and reiterated Catholic teaching against racism. He expressed concern against race killings on Vatican Radio, and intervened diplomatically to attempt to block Nazi deportations of Jews in various countries from 1942 to 1944. However, the Pope's insistence on public neutrality and diplomatic language has become a source of much criticism and debate. Nevertheless, in every country under German occupation, priests played a major part in rescuing Jews. The Israeli historian Pinchas Lapide estimated that Catholic rescue of Jews amounted to somewhere between 700,000 and 860,000 people. However, in the Independent State of Croatia, the vast majority of Catholic clergy supported the Ustaše. It is claimed that some Catholic clergy were directly involved in the killing and forced conversion of Eastern Orthodox Christian Serbs as part of the Genocide of Serbs in the Independent State of Croatia.

The Nazi persecution of the Catholic Church was at its most intense in Poland, and Catholic resistance to Nazism took various forms. Some 2,579 Catholic clergy were sent to the Priest Barracks of Dachau concentration camp, including 400 Germans. Thousands of priests, nuns and brothers were imprisoned, taken to a concentration camp, tortured and murdered, including Saint Maximilian Kolbe. The Nazis also killed ethnically Jewish converts to Catholicism because of their ethnicity, including Saint Edith Stein. Catholics fought on both sides in the conflict. Catholic clergy played a leading role in the government of the fascist Slovak State, which collaborated with the Nazis, copied their anti-Semitic policies, and helped them to carry out the Holocaust in Slovakia. Jozef Tiso, the President of the Slovak State and a Catholic priest, supported his government's deportation of Slovak Jews to extermination camps. The Vatican protested against these Jewish deportations in Slovakia and in other Nazi puppet regimes including Vichy France, Croatia, Bulgaria, Italy and Hungary.

Around 1943 Adolf Hitler planned the kidnapping of the Pope and his internment in Germany. He gave SS General Wolff a corresponding order to prepare for the action.

==== Jews, the Holocaust and persecution ====
Mark well that in the Catholic Mass, Abraham is our Patriarch and forefather. Anti-Semitism is incompatible with the lofty thought which that fact expresses. It is a movement with which we Christians can have nothing to do. No, no I say to you it is impossible for a Christian to take part in anti-Semitism. It is inadmissible. Through Christ and in Christ we are the spiritual progeny of Abraham. Spiritually we are all Semites.

— Pius XI, September 1938

While Pope Pius XII has been credited with helping to save hundreds of thousands of Jews during the Holocaust, the Church has also been accused of having encouraged centuries of antisemitism by its teachings and not doing enough to stop Nazi atrocities. Many Nazi criminals escaped overseas after the Second World War, also because they had powerful supporters from the Vatican. The judgment of Pius XII is made more difficult by the sources, because the church archives for his tenure as nuncio, cardinal secretary of state and pope are in part closed or not yet processed.

Despite a number of condemnations of atrocities committed during World War II, Pope Pius XII has been criticized for not having explicitly spoken out against the Holocaust. Although he never defended himself against such criticism, there is evidence that he chose to keep his public pronouncements circumspect while acting covertly to assist Jews seeking refuge from the Holocaust. Although Pius XII was exhorted by the British government and the Polish government-in-exile to condemn Nazi atrocities directly, he declined to do so out of concern that such pronouncements would only instigate further persecution by the Nazis. These sentiments were based on opinions expressed to him by bishops in Germany and Poland. When Dutch bishops protested against the wartime deportation of Jews, the Nazis responded by increasing deportations rounding up 92 converts including Edith Stein who were then deported and murdered. "The brutality of the retaliation made an enormous impression on Pius XII." In Poland, the Nazis murdered over 2,500 monks and priests and even more were imprisoned. In the Soviet Union, an even more severe persecution occurred.

After the war, Pius XII's efforts to protect their people were recognised by prominent Jews including Albert Einstein and Rabbi Isaac Herzog. However, the Church has also been accused by some of encouraging centuries of antisemitism and Pius himself of not doing enough to stop Nazi atrocities. Prominent members of the Jewish community have contradicted these criticisms. The Israeli historian Pinchas Lapide interviewed war survivors and concluded that Pius XII "was instrumental in saving at least 700,000, but probably as many as 860,000 Jews from certain death at Nazi hands". Some historians dispute this estimate while others consider Pinchas Lapide's work to be "the definitive work by a Jewish scholar" on the holocaust. Even so, in 2000 Pope John Paul II on behalf of all people, apologized to Jews by inserting a prayer at the Western Wall that read "We're deeply saddened by the behavior of those in the course of history who have caused the children of God to suffer, and asking your forgiveness, we wish to commit ourselves to genuine brotherhood with the people of the Covenant." This papal apology, one of many issued by Pope John Paul II for past human and Church failings throughout history, was especially significant because John Paul II emphasized Church guilt for, and the Second Vatican Council's condemnation of, anti-Semitism. The papal letter We Remember: A Reflection on the Shoah, urged Catholics to repent "of past errors and infidelities" and "renew the awareness of the Hebrew roots of their faith."

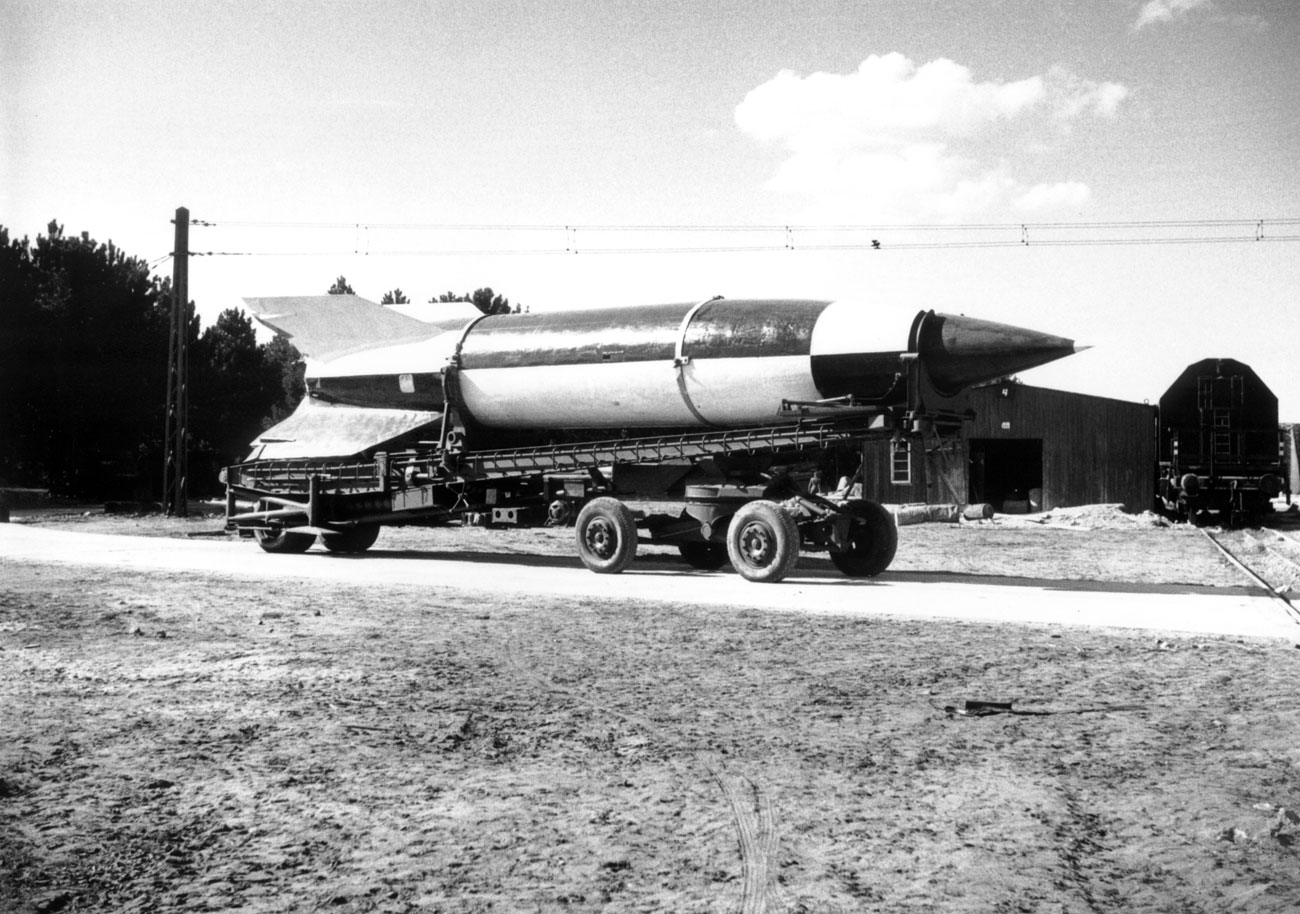
While the church is heavily criticized for having done too little against the Holocaust, the war and the Nazis, individual Catholic resistance groups such as that led by priest Heinrich Maier helped the allies to fight the V-2, which was produced by concentration camp prisoners.

In Austria, since 1938 part of Nazi Germany, in particular, the Catholic resistance against National Socialism was active very early on. Many of the Catholic resistance groups were loyal to the House of Habsburg, which drew the particular anger of the Nazi regime on them. The groups wanted on the one hand, like those around the Augustinian friar Roman Karl Scholz or Jakob Gapp, Otto Neururer, Franz Reinisch, Carl Lampert, Maria Restituta Kafka and Johann Gruber to inform the population about the Nazi crimes and, on the other hand, to take active robust action against the Nazi system. The group around the priest Heinrich Maier (CASSIA – Maier-Messner group) successfully redirected the production sites of V-1, V-2 rockets, Tiger tanks, Messerschmitt Bf 109, Messerschmitt Me 163 Komet and other aircraft to the Allies so that they could bomb more accurately and the war was over faster. Maier and his people were in contact with Allen Dulles, the head of the OSS in Switzerland since 1942. The group reported to him also about the mass murder in Auschwitz. The Gestapo exposed the resistance group and most of the members, including Maier, were severely tortured and killed.

In Poland, the Nazis murdered over 2500 monks and priests while even more were sent to concentration camps. The Priester-Block (priests barracks) in Dachau concentration camp lists 2600 Roman Catholic priests. Stalin staged an even more severe persecution at almost the same time. After World War II historians such as David Kertzer accused the Church of encouraging centuries of anti-Semitism, and Pope Pius XII of not doing enough to stop Nazi atrocities.

Prominent members of the Jewish community, including Golda Meir, Albert Einstein, Moshe Sharett and Rabbi Isaac Herzog contradicted the criticisms and spoke highly of Pius' efforts to protect Jews, while others such as rabbi David G. Dalin noted that "hundreds of thousands" of Jews were saved by the Church.

Regarding the matter, historian Derek Holmes wrote, "There is no doubt that the Catholic districts, resisted the lure of National Socialism Nazism far better than the Protestant ones." Pope Pius XI declared – Mit brennender Sorge – that Fascist governments had hidden "pagan intentions" and expressed the irreconcilability of the Catholic position and Totalitarian Fascist State Worship, which placed the nation above God and fundamental human rights and dignity. His declaration that "Spiritually, [Christians] are all Semites" prompted the Nazis to give him the title "Chief Rabbi of the Christian World".

Catholic priests were executed in concentration camps alongside Jews; for example, 2,600 Catholic Priests were imprisoned in Dachau, and 2,000 of them were executed. A further 2,700 Polish priests were executed (a quarter of all Polish priests), and 5,350 Polish nuns were either displaced, imprisoned, or executed. Many Catholic laypeople and clergy played notable roles in sheltering Jews during the Holocaust, including Pope Pius XII (1876–1958). The head rabbi of Rome became a Catholic in 1945 and, in honour of the actions the Pope undertook to save Jewish lives, he took the name Eugenio (the pope's first name). A former Israeli consul in Italy claimed: "The Catholic Church saved more Jewish lives during the war than all the other churches, religious institutions, and rescue organisations put together."

=== Independent State of Croatia ===
In dismembered Yugoslavia, the Church favored the Nazi-installed Croatian Roman Catholic fascist Ustaše regime due to its anti-communist ideology and for the potential to reinstate Catholic influence in the region following the dissolution of Austria-Hungary. Pius XII was a long-standing supporter of Croat nationalism; he hosted a national pilgrimage to Rome in November 1939 for the cause of the canonization of Nikola Tavelić, and largely "confirmed the Ustashe perception of history" writes John Cornwell. The Church however did not formally recognize the Independent State of Croatia (NDH).

Despite being informed of the regime's genocide against Orthodox Serbs, Jews and other non-Croats, the Church did not publicly speak out against it, preferring to exert pressure through diplomacy. In assessing the Vatican's position, historian Jozo Tomasevich writes that "it seems the Catholic Church fully supported the [Ustaše] regime and its policies."

After the war, many Ustaše fled the country with the help of Father Krunoslav Draganović, secretary of the Pontifical Croatian College of St. Jerome in Rome. Pius XII protected dictator Ante Pavelić after World War II, gave him "refuge in the Vatican properties in Rome", and assisted in his flight to South America; Pavelić and Pius XII shared the goal of a Catholic state in the Balkans and were unified in their opposition to the rising Communist state under Tito.

== Latin America ==
South America, historically Catholic, has experienced a large Evangelical and Pentecostal infusion in the 20th century due to the influx of Christian missionaries from abroad. For example: Brazil, South America's largest country, is the largest Catholic country in the world, and at the same time is the largest Evangelical country in the world (based on population). Some of the largest Christian congregations in the world are found in Brazil.

== China ==
In 1939, Pope Pius XII, within weeks of his coronation, reverted the 250-year-old Vatican policy and permitted Catholics to practice Confucianism. The Church began to flourish again with twenty new arch-dioceses, seventy-nine dioceses and thirty-eight apostolic prefects, but only until 1949, when the Communist revolution took over the country.

== Second Vatican Council ==
The Catholic Church engaged in a comprehensive process of reform during and after the Second Vatican Council (Vatican II, 1962–65). Intended as a continuation of Vatican I, under Pope John XXIII the council developed into an engine of modernisation. It was tasked with making the historical teachings of the Church clear to a modern world, and made pronouncements on topics including the nature of the church, the mission of the laity and religious freedom. Efforts by the Church to improve Christian unity became a priority. In addition to finding common ground on certain issues with Protestant churches, the Catholic Church has discussed the possibility of unity with the Eastern Orthodox Church.

On 11 October 1962 Pope John XXIII opened the Second Vatican Council, the 21st ecumenical council of the Catholic Church. The council was "pastoral" in nature, emphasising and clarifying already defined dogma, revising liturgical practices, and providing guidance for articulating traditional Church teaching amid the "opportunities" presented by contemporary times. One of the first milestones in the deliberations of the council was its instruction that the Mass could be celebrated in vernacular languages as well as in Latin. The council approved a revision of the liturgy and permitted the Latin liturgical rites to use vernacular languages for mass and other sacraments.

A major event of the Council was the issuance by Pope Paul VI and Orthodox Patriarch Athenagoras of a joint expression of regret for many of the past actions that had led up to the Great Schism between the Western and Eastern churches, expressed as the Catholic-Orthodox Joint declaration of 1965. At the same time, they lifted the mutual excommunications dating from the 11th century.

At the Council, the debate on papal primacy and authority re-emerged, and in the Dogmatic Constitution on the Church Lumen gentium, the Roman Catholic Church's teaching on the authority of the Pope, bishops and councils was further elaborated. Vatican II sought to correct the unbalanced ecclesiology left behind by Vatican I. The result is the body of teaching about the papacy and episcopacy contained in the Dogmatic Constitution on the Church, Lumen gentium.

Vatican II reaffirmed everything Vatican I taught about papal primacy and infallibility, but it added important points about bishops. Bishops, it says, are not "vicars of the Roman Pontiff". Rather, in governing their local churches they are "vicars and legates of Christ". Together, they form a body, a "college", whose head is the pope. This episcopal college is responsible for the well-being of the Universal Church. Here in a nutshell are the basic elements of the council's much-discussed communio ecclesiology, which affirms the importance of local churches and the doctrine of collegiality.

In a key passage about collegiality, Vatican II teaches: "The order of bishops is the successor to the college of the apostles in their role as teachers and pastors, and in it the apostolic college is perpetuated. Together with their head, the Supreme Pontiff, and never apart from him, they have supreme and full authority over the Universal Church; but this power cannot be exercised without the agreement of the Roman Pontiff". Much of the present discussion of papal primacy is concerned with exploring the implications of this passage.

Chapter 3 of the dogmatic constitution on the Church of Vatican Council I (Pastor aeternus) is the principal document of the Magisterium about the content and nature of the primatial power of the Roman Pontiff. Chapter 4 is a development and defining of one particular characteristic of this primatial power, namely the Pope's supreme teaching authority, i.e. when the Pope speaks ex cathedra he teaches the doctrine of the faith infallibly.

=== Reforms ===
Changes to old rites and ceremonies following Vatican II produced a variety of responses. Some stopped going to church, while others tried to preserve the old liturgy with the help of sympathetic priests. These formed the basis of today's Traditionalist Catholic groups, which believe that the reforms of Vatican II have gone too far. Liberal Catholics form another dissenting group who feel that the Vatican II reforms did not go far enough. The liberal views of theologians such as Hans Küng and Charles Curran, led to Church withdrawal of their authorization to teach as Catholics. According to Professor Thomas Bokenkotter, most Catholics "accepted the changes more or less gracefully". In 2007, Benedict XVI reinstated the old form of mass as an option, to be celebrated upon request by the faithful.

A new Codex Juris Canonici – Canon Law called for by John XXIII, was promulgated by Pope John Paul II on 25 January 1983. It includes numerous reforms and alterations in Church law and Church discipline for the Latin Church. It replaced the 1917 version issued by Benedict XV.

The Catholic Church initiated a comprehensive process of reform under Pope John XXIII. Intended as a continuation of the First Vatican Council, the Second Vatican Council (1962–1965), developed into an engine of modernisation, making pronouncements on religious freedom, the nature of the Church and the mission of the laity. The role of the bishops of the Church was brought into renewed prominence, especially when seen collectively, as a college that has succeeded to that of the Apostles in teaching and governing the Church. This college does not exist without its head, the successor of St. Peter. It also permitted the Latin liturgical rites to use vernacular languages as well as Latin during Mass and other sacraments. Christian unity became a greater priority. In addition to finding more common ground with Protestant Churches, the Catholic Church has reopened discussions regarding the possibility of unity with the Eastern Orthodox churches.

== Modernism and Liberation theology ==
In the 1960s, growing social awareness and politicization in the Church in Latin America gave birth to liberation theology. The Peruvian priest, Gustavo Gutiérrez, became a primary theorist and, in 1979, the bishops' conference in Mexico officially declared the Latin American Church's "preferential option for the poor". Archbishop Óscar Romero, a supporter of the movement, became the region's most famous contemporary martyr in 1980, when he was murdered by forces allied with the government of El Salvador while saying Mass. Both Pope John Paul II and Pope Benedict XVI (as Cardinal Ratzinger) denounced the movement. The Brazilian theologian-priest Leonardo Boff was twice ordered to cease publishing and teaching. Pope John Paul II was criticized for his severity in dealing with proponents of the movement, but he maintained that the Church, in its efforts to champion the poor, should not do so by advocating violence or engaging in partisan politics. The movement is still alive in Latin America today, although the Church now faces the challenge of Pentecostal revival in much of the region.

== Sexuality and gender issues ==
The sexual revolution of the 1960s brought challenging issues for the Church. Pope Paul VI's 1968 encyclical Humanae vitae reaffirmed the Catholic Church's traditional view of marriage and marital relations and asserted a continued proscription of artificial birth control. In addition, the encyclical reaffirmed the sanctity of life from conception to natural death and asserted a continued condemnation of both abortion and euthanasia as grave sins which were equivalent to murder.

=== Ordination of women ===
Efforts to lead the Church to consider the ordination of women led Pope John Paul II to issue two documents to explain Church teaching. Mulieris dignitatem was issued in 1988 to clarify women's equally important and complementary role in the work of the Church. Then in 1994, Ordinatio Sacerdotalis explained that the Church extends ordination only to men in order to follow the example of Jesus, who chose only men for this specific duty.

=== Humanae vitae ===
The sexual revolution of the 1960s precipitated Pope Paul VI's 1968 encyclical Humanae vitae (On Human Life), which rejected the use of contraception, including sterilization, claiming these work against the intimate relationship and moral order of husband and wife by directly opposing God's will. It approved Natural Family Planning as a legitimate means to limit family size. Abortion was condemned by the Church as early as the 1st century, again in the 14th century and again in 1995 with Pope John Paul II's encyclical Evangelium vitae (Gospel of Life). This encyclical condemned the "culture of death" which the pope often used to describe the societal embrace of contraception, abortion, euthanasia, suicide, capital punishment, and genocide. The Church's rejection of the use of condoms has provoked criticism, especially with respect to countries where the incidence of AIDS and HIV has reached epidemic proportions. The Church maintains that in countries like Kenya and Uganda, where behavioral changes are encouraged alongside condom use, greater progress in controlling the disease has been made than in those countries solely promoting condoms. Feminists disagreed with these and other Church teachings and worked together with a coalition of American nuns to lead the Church to consider the ordination of women. They stated that many of the major Church documents were supposedly full of anti-female prejudice and a number of studies were conducted to discover how this supposed prejudice developed when it was deemed contrary to the openness of Jesus. These events led Pope John Paul II to issue the 1988 encyclical Mulieris dignitatem (On the Dignity of Women), which declared that women had a different, yet equally important role in the Church. In 1994 the encyclical Ordinatio sacerdotalis (On Ordination to the Priesthood) further explained that the Church follows the example of Jesus, who chose only men for the specific priestly duty.

== Modern response to Protestantism ==
Well into the 20th century, Catholics—even if no longer resorting to persecution—still defined Protestants as heretics. Thus, Hilaire Belloc – in his time one of the most conspicuous speakers for Catholicism in Britain – was outspoken about the "Protestant heresy".

In the second half of the century – and especially in the wake of Vatican II – the Catholic Church, in the spirit of ecumenism, no longer referred to Protestantism as a heresy, even if the teachings of Protestantism are heretical from a Catholic perspective. Modern usage favors referring to Protestants as "separated brethren" rather than "heretics". The latter term is occasionally applied to Catholics who abandon their Church to join a Protestant denomination. Many Catholics consider most Protestants to be material rather than formal heretics, and thus non-culpable.

Among the doctrines of Protestantism that the Catholic Church considers heretical are the beliefs that: the Bible is the only source and rule of faith ("sola scriptura"), faith alone can lead to salvation ("sola fide"), and no sacramental, ministerial priesthood is attained by ordination, but there is only the (mutually accepted) universal or collective priesthood of all believers.

1999 saw a milestone in the release of the Joint Declaration on the Doctrine of Justification between the Catholic Church and Lutheran churches. This states that the churches are actually in fundamental agreement on Justification, with different characteristic emphases, and did not teach the views mutually demonized at the time of the Reformation. Since 1999, many other Protestant and Evangelical denominations have also endorsed this statement.

== Catholic-Orthodox dialogue ==
Ecumenism broadly refers to movements between Christian groups to establish a degree of unity through dialogue. Ecumenism is derived from Greek οἰκουμένη (oikoumene), which means "the inhabited world", but more figuratively something like "universal oneness". The movement can be distinguished into Catholic and Protestant movements, with the latter characterised by a redefined ecclesiology of "denominationalism" (which the Catholic Church, among others, rejects).

Over the last century, a number of moves have been made to reconcile the schism between the Catholic Church and the Eastern Orthodox churches. Although progress has been made, concerns over papal primacy and the independence of the smaller Orthodox churches has blocked a final resolution of the schism.

Some of the most difficult questions in relations with the ancient Eastern Churches concern some doctrine (i.e. Filioque, Scholasticism, functional purposes of asceticism, the essence of God, Hesychasm, Fourth Crusade, establishment of the Latin Empire, Uniatism to note but a few) as well as practical matters, such as the concrete exercise of the claim to papal primacy and how to ensure that ecclesiastical union would not result in absorption of the smaller Churches by the Latin component of the much larger Catholic Church (the most numerous single religious denomination in the world). Both parties wanted to avoid the stifling or abandonment of the other churches' rich theological, liturgical and cultural heritage.

With respect to Catholic relations with Protestant communities, certain commissions were established to foster dialogue, and documents have been published that address points of doctrinal unity, such as the Joint Declaration on the Doctrine of Justification produced with the Lutheran World Federation in 1999.

=== Joint Theological Commission ===
The Joint International Commission for Theological Dialogue Between the Catholic Church and the Orthodox Church first met in Rhodes in 1980.

=== Other moves toward reconciliation ===
In June 1995, Patriarch Bartholomew I, who was elected as the 273rd Ecumenical Patriarch of Constantinople in October 1991, visited the Vatican for the first time, when he joined in the historic inter-religious day of prayer for peace at Assisi. Pope John Paul II and the Patriarch explicitly stated their mutual "desire to relegate the excommunications of the past to oblivion and to set out on the way to re-establishing full communion."

In May 1999, John Paul II traveled to Romania: the first pope since the Great Schism to visit an Eastern Orthodox country. Upon greeting John Paul II, the Romanian Patriarch Teoctist stated: "The second millennium of Christian history began with a painful wounding of the unity of the Church; the end of this millennium has seen a real commitment to restoring Christian unity." Pope John Paul II visited other strongly Orthodox areas such as Ukraine, despite lack of welcome at times. He said that healing the divisions between Western and Eastern Christianity was one of his fondest wishes.

20th-century timeline
- 1901 – Nazarene John Diaz goes to Cape Verde Islands; Maude Cary sails for Morocco; Oriental Missionary Society founded by Charles Cowman (his wife is the compiler of popular devotional book Streams in the Desert); Missionary James Chalmers killed and eaten by cannibals in Papua New Guinea
- 1902 – Swiss members of the Plymouth Brethren Christian Missions in Many Lands (CMML) enter Laos; California Yearly Meeting of Friends opens work in Guatemala
- 1903 – Church of the Nazarene enters Mexico
- 1904 – Premillennialist theologian William Eugene Blackstone begins teaching that the world has already been evangelized, citing Acts 2:5, 8:4, Mark 16:20 and Colossians 1:23
- 1904 – Welsh revival
- 1905 – Gunnerius Tollefsen is converted at a Salvation Army meeting under the preaching of Samuel Logan Brengle. Later he would become a missionary to the Belgian Congo and then first mission secretary of the Norwegian Pentecostal movement.
- 1905 French law on the separation of Church and State
- 1906 – The Evangelical Alliance Mission (TEAM) opens work in Venezuela with T. J. Bach and John Christiansen
- 1906 – Albert Schweitzer publishes The Quest of the Historical Jesus (English translation 1910)
- 1906 – Biblia Hebraica
- 1906–1909 – Azusa Street Revival in Los Angeles, CA begins modern Pentecostal movement
- 1907 – Massive revival meetings in Korea; Harmon Schmelzenbach sails for Africa; Presbyterians and Methodists open Union Theological Seminary in Manila, Philippines; Bolivian Indian Mission founded by George Allen
- 1907–1912 – Nicholas of Japan, Archbishop of Japanese Orthodox Church
- 1908 – Missionaries of St. Charles Borromeo – Scalabrinian was approved in principle by Pope Leo XIII in a papal brief dated 25 November 1887 and its Constitution definitively approved by a decree of the Sacred Congregation of Propaganda
- 1908 – Gospel Missionary Union opens work in Colombia with Charles Chapman and John Funk; Assemblies of God enter Rome and southern Italy as well as Egypt
- 1909 – Pentecostal movement reaches Chile through ministry of American Methodist Willis Hoover
- 1909 – Scofield Reference Bible
- 1909–1911 – The Rosicrucian Fellowship, an international association of Esoteric Christian mystics, founded at Mount Ecclesia
- 1910 – C.T. Studd establishes Heart of Africa Mission, now called WEC International; Edinburgh Missionary Conference held in Scotland, presided over by John Mott, beginning modern Protestant ecumenical cooperation in missions
- 1910 – Edinburgh Missionary Conference launches modern missions movement and modern ecumenical movement; 5-point statement of the Presbyterian General Assembly, also used by Fundamentalists
- 1910–1915 – The Fundamentals, a 12-volume collection of essays by 64 British and American scholars and preachers, a foundation of Fundamentalism
- 1911 – Christian & Missionary Alliance enters Cambodia and Vietnam.
- 1912 – Conference of British Missionary Societies formed; International Review of Missions begins publication
- 1913 – African-American Eliza George sails from New York for Liberia; William Whiting Borden dies in Egypt while preparing to take the gospel to the Muslims in China
- 1913 – Catholic Encyclopedia
- 1914 – Large-scale revival movement in Uganda; C.T. Studd reports a revival movement in the Congo
- 1914 – Iglesia ni Cristo incorporated in the Philippines
- 1914 – Welsh Church Act 1914
- 1914–1918 – World War I numerous missionaries in Africa and Asia in British, French, German and Belgian colonies are expelled or detained for the duration of the war, if their nation was at war with the colonial authority
- 1915 – Founded in 1913 in Nanjing, China as a women's Christian college, Ginling College officially opens with eight students and six teachers. It was supported by four missions: the Northern Baptists, the Christian Church (Disciples of Christ), the Methodists, and the Presbyterians.
- 1915–1917 – Armenian genocide
- 1916 – Rhenish missionaries are forced to leave Ondjiva in southern Angola under pressure from the Portuguese authorities and Chief Mandume of the Kwanyama. By then, four congregations existed with a confessing membership of 800.
- 1916 – And did those feet in ancient time
- 1916 – Father Divine founded International Peace Mission movement
- 1917 – Interdenominational Foreign Mission Association (IFMA) founded
- 1917 – Heinrich Hansen publishes Lutheran Evangelical Catholic theses Stimuli et Clavi
- 1917 – Miracle of the Sun an event that was witnessed by as many as 100,000 people on 13 October 1917 in the Cova da Iria fields near Fátima, Portugal. How the Sun Danced at Midday at Fátima
- 1917 – Our Lady appears to 3 young people, in Fatima, Portugal. They were Jacinta Marto, Tiago Veloso and Lúcia (Sister Lucia)
- 1917 – True Jesus Church founded in Beijing
- 1917 – Restitution of the Moscow Patriarchy with Tikhon as patriarch
- 1918 – James L. Barton, head of the American Board of Commissioners for Foreign Missions, asked missionaries who had served in the Ottoman Empire for detailed reports of the horrors they had witnessed of the Armenian genocide
- 1918 – Execution of Holy Martyrs of Russia, including the last tsar, Nicholas II, and his wife, Alexandra Feodorovna
- 1919 – The Union Version of Bible in Chinese is published; Gospel Missionary Union enters Sudan
- 1919 – Karl Barth's Commentary on Romans is published, critiquing Liberal Christianity and beginning the neo-orthodox movement
- 1920 – Baptist Mid-Missions formed by William Haas; Church of the Nazarene enters Syria; Columbans enter Australia and New Zealand
- 1920 – The Ecclesia, an Esoteric Christian Temple, was erected and dedicated on Christmas day (25 December)
- 1921 – Founding of International Missionary Council (IMC); Norwegian Mission Council formed; Columbans enter China
- 1921 – Oxford Group founded at Oxford
- 1922 – Nazarenes enter Mozambique
- 1923 – Scottish missionaries begin work in British Togoland
- 1923 – Aimee Semple McPherson built Angelus Temple
- 1924 – Bible Churchman's Missionary Society opens work in Upper Burma; Baptist Mid-Missions begins work in Venezuela
- 1925 – E. Stanley Jones, Methodist missionary to India, writes The Christ of the Indian Road
- 1925 – Scopes Trial, caused division among Fundamentalists
- 1925 – United Church of Canada formed
- 1926 – Dawson Trotman, founder of the Navigators, is converted through Bible verses he had memorized
- 1926 – Father Charles Coughlin's first radio broadcast
- 1926–1929 – Cristero War in Mexico, the Constitution of 1917 brought persecution of Christian practices and anti-clerical laws – approximately 4,000 Catholic Priests were expelled, assassinated or executed
- 1927 – East African revival movement (Balokole) emerges in Rwanda and moves across several other countries
- 1927 – Pope Pius XI decrees Comma Johanneum open to dispute
- 1928 – Cuba Bible Institute (West Indies Mission) opens; Jerusalem Conference of International Missionary Council; foundation of Borneo Evangelical Mission by Hudson Southwell, Frank Davidson and Carey Tolley.
- 1929 – Christian & Missionary Alliance enters East Borneo (Indonesia) and Thailand
- 1929 – Lateran Treaty signed containing three agreements between kingdom of Italy and the papacy.
- 1930 – Christian & Missionary Alliance starts work among Baouli tribe in the Côte d'Ivoire
- 1930 – Rastafari movement founded
- 1931 – HCJB radio station started in Quito, Ecuador by Clarence Jones; Baptist Mid-Missions enters Liberia
- 1931 – Franciscan missionary the Venerable Gabriele Allegra arrives in Hunan China from Italy to start translating the Bible
- 1931 – Christ the Redeemer (statue) in Rio de Janeiro, Brazil
- 1931 – Jehovah's Witnesses founded see 1884 for more information.
- 1932 – Assemblies of God open mission work in Colombia; Laymen's Missionary Inquiry report published
- 1932 – Our Lady appears to five school children in Beauraing, Belgium as Lady Virgin of the Poor
- 1933 – Gladys Aylward (subject of movie "The Inn of the Sixth Happiness") arrives in China; Columbans enter Korea
- 1933 – Catholic Worker Movement founded
- 1934 – William Cameron Townsend begins the Summer Institute of Linguistics; Columbans enter Japan
- 1934 – Herbert W. Armstrong founded Radio Church of God
- 1935 – Frank C. Laubach, American missionary to the Philippines, perfects the "Each one teach one" literacy program, which has been used worldwide to teach 60 million people to read
- 1935 – Billy Sunday, early U.S. radio evangelist
- 1935 – Gunnar Rosendal publishes Lutheran High Church manifesto Kyrklig förnyelse
- 1935 – Dr. Frank C. Laubach, known as "The Apostle to the Illiterates", working in the Philippines, developed a literacy program that continues to teach millions of people to read.
- 1935 – Rahlf's critical edition of the Koine Greek Septuagint
- 1936 – With the outbreak of civil war in Spain, missionaries are forced to leave that country.
- 1937 – After expulsion of missionaries from Ethiopia by Italian invaders, widespread revival erupts among Protestant (SIM) churches in south; Child Evangelism Fellowship (CEF ) founded by Jesse Irvin Overholzer
- 1938 – West Indies Mission enters Dominican Republic; Church Missionary Society forced out of Egypt; Madras World Missionary Conference held; Dr. Orpha Speicher completes construction of Reynolds Memorial Hospital in central India
- 1942 – William Cameron Townsend founds Wycliffe Bible Translators.
- 1942 – National Association of Evangelicals founded\
- 1944 – Missionaries return to Suki, Papua New Guinea after withdrawal of the Japanese military
- 1945 – Mission Aviation Fellowship formed; Far East Broadcasting Company (FEBC) founded; Evangelical Foreign Missions Association formed by denominational mission boards
- 1945 – The Venerable Gabriele Allegra establishes the Studium Biblicum Franciscanum in Beijing
- 1945 – Dietrich Bonhoeffer is executed by the Nazis
- 1945 – Ludwig Müller
- 1945 – On the Feast of the Annunciation, Our Lady appears to a simple woman, Ida Peerdeman, in Amsterdam. This was the first of 56 appearances as "Our Lady of All Nations" , which took place between 1945 and 1959.
- 1948 – Alfredo del Rosso merges his Italian Holiness Mission with the Church of the Nazarene, thus opening Nazarene work on the European continent.
- 1948 – Israeli Declaration of Independence, see also Christian Zionism
- 1948 – World Council of Churches is founded
- 1949 – Southern Baptist Mission board opens work in Venezuela, Mary Tripp sent out by CEF Child Evangelism Fellowship to the Netherlands.
- 1949 – evangelist Billy Graham preaches his first Los Angeles crusade
- 1950 – Paul Orjala arrives in Haiti; radio station 4VEH, owned by East and West Indies Bible Mission, starts broadcasting from near Cap Haitien, Haiti
- 1950 – Assumption of Mary decreed by Pope Pius XII
- 1950 – Missionaries of Charity founded by Mother Teresa
- 1951 – World Evangelical Alliance organized; Bill and Vonette Bright create Campus Crusade for Christ at UCLA; Alaska Missions is founded (later to be renamed InterAct Ministries).
- 1951 – Campus Crusade for Christ founded at UCLA
- 1951 – Bishop Fulton Sheen (1919–1979) debuts his television program Life is Worth Living on the DuMont Network. His half-hour lecture program on Roman Catholic theology remained the number one show on U.S. television for its time slot, winning several Emmys until Sheen ended the program in 1957.
- 1951 – The Last Temptation a fictional account of the life of Jesus written by Nikos Kazantzakis, wherein Christ's divinity is juxtaposed with his humanity, is published, and promptly banned in many countries.
- 1952 – Trans World Radio founded
- 1952 – C. S. Lewis' Mere Christianity
- 1952 – Novum Testamentum Graece, critical edition of Greek NT, basis of modern translations
- 1953 – Walter Trobisch, who would publish I Loved a Girl in 1962, begins pioneer missionary work in northern Cameroon.
- 1954 – Mennonite Board of Missions and Charities opens work in Cuba; Argentina Revival breaks out during Tommy Hicks crusade; Augustinians re-established in Japan; Columbans enter Chile
- 1954 – Unification Church founded under the name Holy Spirit Association for the Unification of World Christianity, acronymed HSA-UWC.
- 1954 – U.S. Pledge of Allegiance modified by act of Congress from "one nation, indivisible" to "one nation under God, indivisible"
- 1955 – Donald McGavran publishes Bridges of God; Dutch missionary "Brother Andrew" makes first of many Bible smuggling trips into Communist Eastern Europe;
- 1956 – U.S. missionaries Jim Elliot, Pete Fleming, Edward McCully, Nate Saint, and Roger Youderian are killed by Huaorani Indians in eastern Ecuador. (See Operation Auca)
- 1956 – Anchor Bible Series
- 1956 – In God We Trust designated U.S. national motto
- 1956 – The Ten Commandments
- 1957 – East Asia Christian Conference (EACC) founded at Prapat, Sumatra, Indonesia
- 1957 – United Church of Christ founded by ecumenical union of Congregationalists and Evangelical & Reformed, representing Calvinists and Lutherans
- 1957 – English translation of Walter Bauer's Wörterbuch zu den Schriften des Neuen Testaments: A Greek-English Lexicon of the New Testament and Other Early Christian Literature, University of Chicago Press
- 1958 – Rochunga Pudaite completes translation of Bible into Hmar language (India) and was appointed the leader of the Indo-Burma Pioneer Mission; Missionaries Elisabeth Elliot and Rachel Saint make first peaceful contact with the Huaorani tribe in Ecuador.
- 1958 – Sedevacantism
- 1959 – Josephine Makil becomes the first African-American to join Wycliffe Bible Translators; Feba Radio founded in UK.
- 1959 – Family Radio founded
- 1960 – Kenneth Strachan starts Evangelism-in-Depth in Central America; 18,000 people in Morocco reply to newspaper ad by Gospel Missionary Union offering free correspondence course on Christianity; Loren Cunningham founds Youth with a Mission; The Asia Evangelistic Fellowship (AEF), one of the largest Asian indigenous missionary organisations, is launched in Singapore by G. D. James
- 1961 – International Christian radio stations now number 30
- 1961 – Christian Broadcasting Network founded
- 1962 – Don Richardson goes to Sawi tribe in Papua New Guinea; Operation Mobilisation founded in Mexico by George Verwer
- 1962 – Engel v. Vitale, first U.S. Supreme Court decision against school prayer
- 1962–1965 – Catholic Second Vatican Council, announced by Pope John XXIII in 1959, produced 16 documents which became official Roman Catholic teaching after approval by the Pope, purpose to renew "ourselves and the flocks committed to us"
- 1963 – Theological Education by Extension movement launched in Guatemala by Ralph Winter and James Emery
- 1963 – Martin Luther King Jr. leads a civil rights march in Washington, D.C.
- 1963 – Oral Roberts University founded
- 1963 – campaign by Madalyn Murray O'Hair results in U.S. Supreme Court ruling prohibiting reading of Bible in public schools
- 1964 – In separate incidents, rebels in the Congo kill missionaries Paul Carlson and Irene Ferrel as well as brutalizing missionary doctor Helen Roseveare; Carlson is featured on 4 December Time magazine cover; Hans von Staden of the Dorothea Mission proposes to Patrick Johnstone that he write the book now titled Operation World
- 1965 – Rousas John Rushdoony founds Chalcedon Foundation
- 1965 – Reginald H. Fuller's The Foundations of New Testament Christology
- 1966 – Red Guards destroy churches in China; Berlin Congress on Evangelism; Missionaries expelled from Burma; God's Smuggler published
- 1966 – Raymond E. Brown's Commentary on the Gospel of John
- 1967 – All foreign missionaries expelled from Guinea
- 1968 – The Studium Biblicum Translation of the Bible is published in Chinese by the Venerable Gabriele Allegra
- 1968 – Wu Yung and others form the Chinese Missions Overseas in order to send out missionaries from Taiwan to do cross-cultural ministry; Augustinian order re-established in India
- 1968 – Zeitoun, Egypt, a bright image of the Virgin Mary as Our Lady of Zeitoun was seen over the Coptic Orthodox Church of Saint Demiana for over a 3-year period. Over six million Egyptians and foreigners saw the image, including Copts, Eastern Orthodox, Roman Catholic, Protestants, Muslims, Jews and people of no particular faith.
- 1969 – OMF International begins "industrial evangelism" to Taiwan's factory workers
- 1970 – Frankfurt Declaration on Mission; Operation Mobilisation launches MV Logos ship; Abp. Makarios III (Mouskos) of Cyprus baptizes 10,000 into the Orthodox Church in Kenya.
- 1970 – Mass of Paul VI replaces Tridentine Mass
- 1970 – The Late, Great Planet Earth futurist book by Hal Lindsey
- 1970s The Jesus movement takes hold in the U.S. One-way.org
- 1971 – Gustavo Gutierrez publishes A Theology of Liberation
- 1971 – Liberty University founded by Jerry Falwell
- 1971 – New American Standard Bible
- 1971 – The Exorcist, a novel of demonic possession and the mysteries of the Catholic faith, is published.
- 1972 – American Society of Missiology founded with journal Missiology
- 1973 – Services by Billy Graham attract four and a half million people in six cities of Korea; first All-Asa Mission Consultation convenes in Seoul, Korea with 25 delegates from 14 countries
- 1973 – New International Version of the Bible is first published (revised in 1978,1984), using a variety of Greek texts, Masoretic Hebrew texts, and current English style
- 1973 – Trinity Broadcasting Network founded
- 1973, 12 June – Near the city of Akita, Our Lady appears to Sister Agnes Katsuko Sasagawa. Three messages were given to Sr. Agnes over a period 5 months. Our Lady of Akita Marian apparitions.
- 1974 – Missiologist Ralph Winter talks about "hidden" or unreached peoples at Lausanne Congress of World Evangelism. Lausanne Covenant is written and ratified
- 1974 – Jim Bakker founds PTL television ministry
- 1975 – Missionaries Armand Doll and Hugh Friberg imprisoned in Mozambique after communist takeover of government
- 1975 – Bruce Metzger's Textual Commentary on the Greek New Testament
- 1976 – U.S. Center for World Mission founded in Pasadena, California; 1600 Chinese assemble in Hong Kong for the Chinese Congress on World Evangelization; Islamic World Congress calls for withdrawal of Christian missionaries; Peace Child by Don Richardson appears in Reader's Digest.
- 1976 – Anneliese Michel, Bavarian woman, underwent exorcism against demon possession
- 1977 – Evangelical Fellowship of India sponsors the All-India Congress on Mission and Evangelization
- 1977 – Focus on the Family founded by James Dobson
- 1977 – New Perspective on Paul
- 1978 – LCWE Consultation on Gospel and Culture in Willowbank, Bermuda; Columbans enter Taiwan
- 1978 – Chicago Statement on Biblical Inerrancy
- 1978–2005 – Pope John Paul II, reaffirmed moral traditions (The Splendor of Truth)
- 1979 – Production of JESUS film commissioned by Bill Bright of Campus Crusade for Christ; Ted Fletcher founds Pioneers, a missionary agency with a focus on "unreached people groups"; Columban missionaries enter Pakistan at the request of the Bishop of Lahore
- 1979 – Jesus, most watched movie of all time according to The New York Times
- 1979 – Moral Majority founded by Jerry Falwell
- 1979–1982 – New King James Version, complete revision of 1611 AV, updates archaisms while retaining style
- 1980 – Philippine Congress on Discipling a Whole Nation; Lausanne Congress on World Evangelism Conference in Pattaya
- 1981 – Colombian terrorists kidnap and kill Wycliffe Bible Translator Chet Bitterman; Project Pearl: one million Bibles are delivered in a single night to thousands of waiting believers in China
- 1981 – Kibeho, Rwanda reported that Our Lady appeared to several teenagers telling them to pray to avoid "rivers of blood". This was an ominious foreshadowing of the Rwanda Genocide of 1994.
- 1981 – Mother Angelica launches EWTN. It grows to become one of the largest television networks in the world. The operation expands to radio in 1992.
- 1982 – Story on "The New Missionary" makes 27 December cover of Time magazine; Andes Evangelical Mission (formerly Bolivian Indian Mission merges into SIM (formerly Sudan Interior Mission
- 1982 – Chicago Statement on Biblical Hermeneutics
- 1983 – Missionary Athletes International, a global soccer ministry, founded by Tim Conrad
- 1984 – Founding of The Mission Society for United Methodists, a voluntary missionary sending agency within the United Methodist Church; rebranded in 2006 to The Mission Society; Founding of STEM (Short Term Evangelical Mission teams) ministry by Roger Petersen signals the rising importance of Short-term missions groups
- 1985 – Howard Foltz founds Accelerating International Mission Strategies (AIMS)
- 1985 – E. P. Sanders' Jesus and Judaism
- 1985 – Jesus Seminar founded
- 1986 – Chicago Statement on Biblical Application
- 1987 – Second International Conference on Missionary Kids (MKs) held in Quito, Ecuador
- 1987 – Danvers Statement – Council on Biblical Manhood and Womanhood
- 1988 – Christian Coalition
- 1988 – The Last Temptation of Christ, directed by Martin Scorsese, is released by Universal Pictures, and promptly attacked as heretical by organized Christian and Catholic groups.
- 1988 – The celebration of 1000 years since the baptism of Kievan Rus throughout the R.O.C.
- 1989 – Adventures In Missions (Georgia) (AIM) Short-term missions agency founded by Seth Barnes; Lausanne II, a world missions conference; concept of 10/40 Window emerges; "Ee-Taow" video released by New Tribes Mission
- 1989 – New Revised Standard Version
- 1990 – American Center for Law and Justice founded
- 1991 – The Marxist government of Ethiopia is overthrown and missionaries are able to return to that country
- 1991 – John P. Meier's series A Marginal Jew: Rethinking the Historical Jesus, v. 1
- 1992 – World Gospel Mission (National Holiness Missionary Society) starts work in Uganda
- 1992 – Catechism of the Catholic Church
- 1993 – Trans World Radio starts broadcasting from a 250,000-watt shortwave transmitter in Russia
- 1994 – Liibaan Ibraahim Hassan, a convert to Christianity in Somalia, is martyred by Islamic militants in the capital city of Mogadishu;
- 1994 – "Evangelicals & Catholics Together"
- 1994 – Answers In Genesis founded by Ken Ham
- 1994 – Porvoo Communion
- 1994, 3 July – Glorification of St. John of Shanghai and San Francisco
- 1995 – Missionary Don Cox abducted in Quito, Ecuador
- 1996 – Nazarenes enter Hungary, Kazakhstan, Pakistan
- 1996 – Cambridge Declaration – Alliance of Confessing Evangelicals
- 1997 – Foreign Mission Board and Home Mission Board of Southern Baptist Convention become the International Mission Board and North American Mission Board with ten thousand missionaries
- 1997, 5–10 March – World Council of Churches: Towards a Common Date for Easter, see also Reform of the date of Easter
- 1998, 6 April – PBS Frontline: From Jesus to Christ
- 1999 – Trans World Radio goes on the air from Grigoriopol (Moldova) using a 1-million-watt AM transmitter; Veteran Australian missionary Graham Stuart Staines and his two sons are burned alive by Hindu extremists as they are sleeping in a car in eastern India.
- 1999 – International House of Prayer in Kansas City begins non-stop 24/7 continual prayer
- 1999 – Gospel of Jesus Christ – An Evangelical Celebration; a consensus Gospel endorsed by various evangelical leaders including J.I. Packer, John Ankerberg, Jerry Falwell, Thomas C. Oden, R.C. Sproul, Wayne Grudem, Charles Swindoll, et al.
- 1999, 31 October – signing of the Joint Declaration on the Doctrine of Justification between the Lutheran World Federation and the Catholic Church
- 2000 – Asia College of Ministry (ACOM), a ministry of Asia Evangelistic Fellowship (AEF), was launched by Jonathan James, to train national missionaries in Asia.
- 2000 – Our Lady appears in Assiut, Upper Egypt; phenomena associated to Our Lady reported again, in 2006, in a Church at the same location during the Mass. Local Coptic priests and then the Coptic Orthodox Church of Assiut issue statements in 2000 and 2006, respectively

== See also ==
- Christianity in the 20th century
- History of the Roman Catholic Church#World War II
- History of Christian theology#Modern Christian theology
- Role of the Roman Catholic Church in civilization
- Timeline of Christianity#19th century
- Timeline of Christian missions#1900 to 1949
- Timeline of the Roman Catholic Church#20th century
- Chronological list of saints and blesseds in the 20th century
