= Frank Laubach =

Christian missionary (1884–1970)

- Laubach, c. 1962
- Born: September 2, 1884
- Died: June 11, 1970 (aged 85)
- Occupation: Missionary

Frank Charles Laubach (September 2, 1884 – June 11, 1970), from Benton, Pennsylvania was a Congregational Christian missionary educated at Union Theological Seminary and Columbia University, and a mystic known as "The Apostle to the Illiterates." In 1915 (see Laubach, Thirty Years With the Silent Billion), while working among Muslims at a remote location in the Philippines, he developed the "Each One Teach One" literacy program. It has been used to teach about 60 million people to read in their own language. He was deeply concerned about poverty, injustice and illiteracy, and considered them barriers to peace in the world.

In 1955, he founded Laubach Literacy, which helped introduce about 150,000 Americans to reading each year and had grown to embrace 34 developing countries. An estimated 2.7 million people worldwide were learning to read through Laubach-affiliated programs. In 2002, this group merged with Literacy Volunteers of America, Inc. to form ProLiteracy Worldwide.

During the latter years of his life, Laubach traveled all over the world speaking on the topics of literacy and world peace. He was the author of a number of devotional writings and works on literacy.

One of his most widely influential devotional works was a pamphlet entitled "The Game with Minutes." In it, Laubach urged Christians to attempt to keep God in mind for at least one second of every minute of the day. In this way, Christians can attempt the attitude of constant prayer spoken of in the First Epistle to the Thessalonians. The pamphlet extolled the virtues of a life lived with an unceasing focus on God. Laubach's insight came from his experiments in prayer detailed in a collection of his letters published under the title, Letters by a Modern Mystic.

Laubach is the only American missionary to be honored on a US postage stamp, a 30¢ Great Americans series stamp in 1984. Laubach Road in Baguio City was named for him.

Laubach had a deep interest in the Philippines. He wrote a biography of the Filipino national hero, Jose Rizal: Man and Martyr, published in Manila in 1936. He also translated the hero's valedictory poem, "Mi Ultimo Adios" (My Last Farewell). His version is ranked second in ideas, content, rhyme, and style among the 35 English translations in a collection.

He was a pioneer mover of Maranao literature. He wrote:

The Moro people of Lake Lanao have amazingly rich literature, all the more amazing since it exists only in the memories of the people and had just begun to be recorded in writing. It consists of lyric and poetry with the epic greatly predominating.

His emphasis on the use of Easy English for literacy led directly to the development by WEC International in 1962 of an evangelistic paper using his basic vocabulary called SOON! which printed about 3 million copies a year and distributed worldwide by post, until it ceased in 2015. He also trained ex-missionary Fred Morris in the use of Worldwide Easy English for his Bible teaching commentaries written in the USA in the 1990s and published by Manna Publications (UK) since the year 2000 .

== Bibliography ==
- Laubach, Frank C. 1925. The people of the Philippines: their religious progress and preparation for spiritual leadership in the Far East. New York: George H. Doran Company.
- Laubach, Frank C. 1938. Toward a Literate World; with a foreword by Edward L. Thorndike. New York: Printed by Columbia University Press for the World literacy committee of the Foreign missions conference of North America.
- Laubach, Frank C. 1940. India Shall be Literate. Jubbulpore, C.P., India: Printed by F. E. Livengood at the Mission press.
- Laubach, Frank C. 1942. You Are My Friends: Harper & Brothers Publishers, New York.
- Laubach, Frank C. 1945. The Silent Billion Speak, New York: Friendship Press.
- Laubach, Frank C. 1946. Prayer: The Mightiest Force in the World. Westwood, N.J.: F. H. Revell Co.
- Laubach, Frank C., translator. 1956. The Inspired Letters in Clearest English (Portions of the New Testament). New York: Thomas Nelson & Sons.
- Laubach, Frank C. 1960. Thirty Years with the Silent Billion: Adventuring in Literacy. Westwood, New Jersey: Fleming H. Revell Company.
- Laubach, Frank C. 1964. How to teach One and Win One for Christ: Christ's plan for winning the world: each one teaches and win one. Grand Rapids: Zondervan Publishing House.
- Laubach, Frank C. 1970. Forty Years with the Silent Billion: Adventuring in Literacy. Old Tappan, N.J.: F. H. Revell Co.
