= Frederik Thuresen =

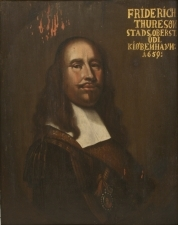
Frederik Thuresen.

Frederik Thuresen (sometimes spelled Turesen) (8 December 1613 – 17 April 1675) was a Danish merchant and head of Copenhagen's Civilian Guard (Stadshauptmand, later stadsoberst). In his capacity of chief of the Civilian Guard, he played a key role in the successful defence of the city during the Swedish assault on Copenhagen in 1659. After the war with Sweden, he led the bourgeois in calling for a new city charter, with provisions about the establishment of a city council, new trade privileges, as well as in advocating for a hereditary monarchy. He served as the first president of the Assembly of 32 Men from 1659 until his death.

== Early life ==
Thuresen was born on 8 December 1613 in Aalborg, the son of merchant Thure Frederiksen and Ingeborg Hansdatter. His parents came from influential families. Both of his grandfathers, a great-grandfather and a great-great-grandfather had all served as burgermasters in the city. He received a commercial education in Copenhagen and the Netherlands, England, and France.

== Commercial career and property ==
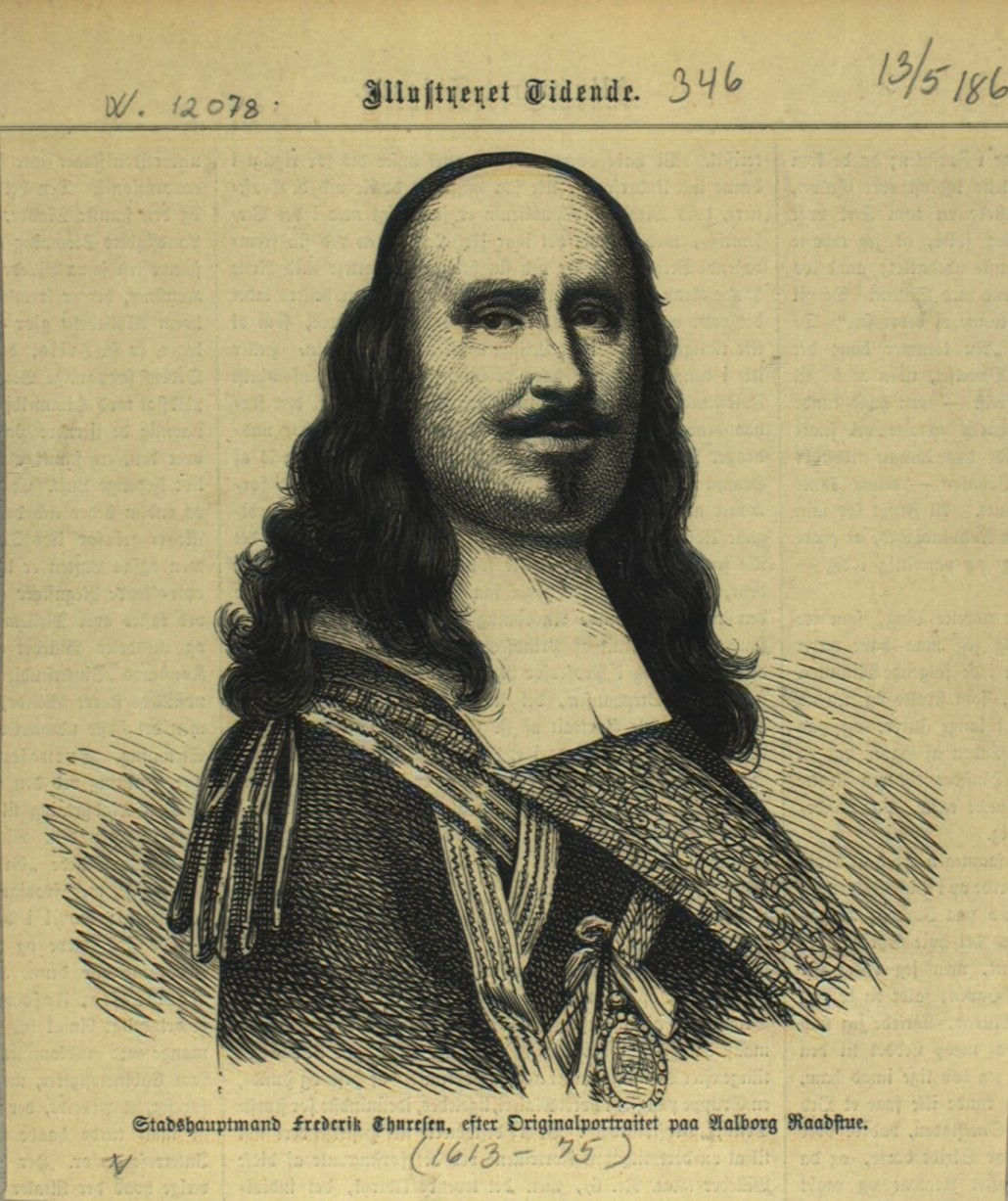

In 1645, he took citizenship as a merchant in Copenhagen. In the 1650s he, together with the Iceland Company's chief accountant Johan Steinkuhl, engaged in whaling in the North Atlantic, but without much success. By 1661, he had become a wealthy man. Together with Johan Steinkuhl, Herman Isenberg and Peder Pedersen, he was part of the management of the Danish Salt Company (dissolved 1662).

Through his marriage, he came into possession of the property Eastern Quarter No. 213 (now Ved Stranden 16), This property was his home for the remainder of his life. By 1653, he had also acquired No. 199 in the same quarter (now Fortunstræde 5). From at least 1661 to 1668, he was the owner of the quarter's No. 68. In 1661–1664, he owned Western Quarter No.

During the war of 1658–60 he provided the crown with loans. As payment, he was granted Sundby Manor in North Jutland. In 1674, he sold Sundby Manor to Christoffer Lindenow. In 1673, he had bought Bremersvold on Lolland.

== Public offices ==
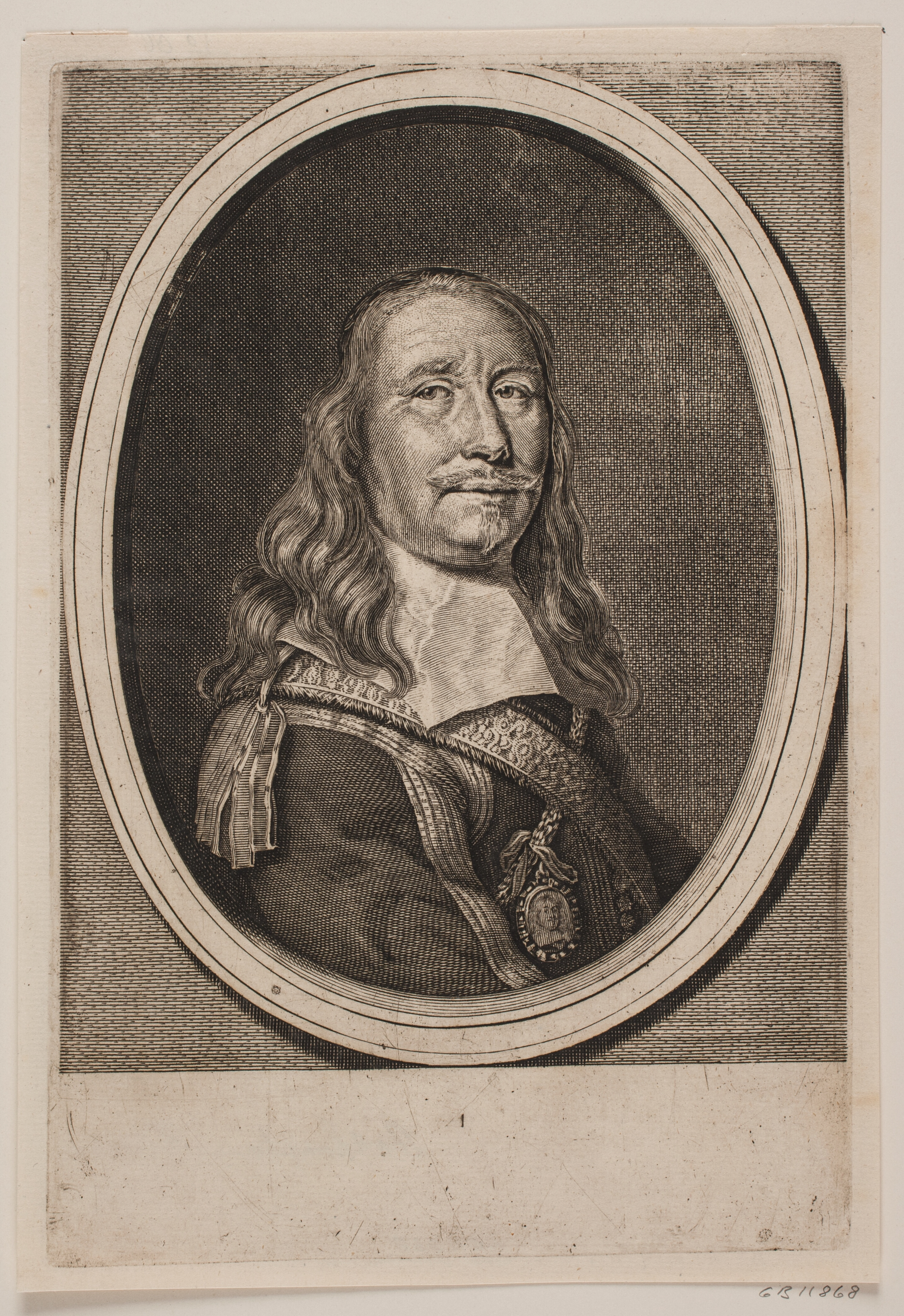
Thuresen by Albert Haelwegh.

Thuresen was active in Copenhagen's Civilian Guards (Borgervæbningen) of which he had become chief (stadshauptmand). He took care of its reorganization and accommodation with great skill and energy. In 1773, he presented a standard to each of the militia's 12 regiments (one for each quarter). When the militia was reorganized in 1664 he became city colonel directly under the king.

In 1663 and 1664 he also participated in the organization of the city's fire corps, When this brought him into conflict with the city council, he received the king's support. Finally, in 1672 he was a member of a commission that was to set reasonable prices for meat, bread and beer.

In 1658, Thuresen was part of the group of prominent citizens who approached the king to call for a new city charter, city council and special privileges. In 1659, he became the first present of the Assembly of 32 Men.

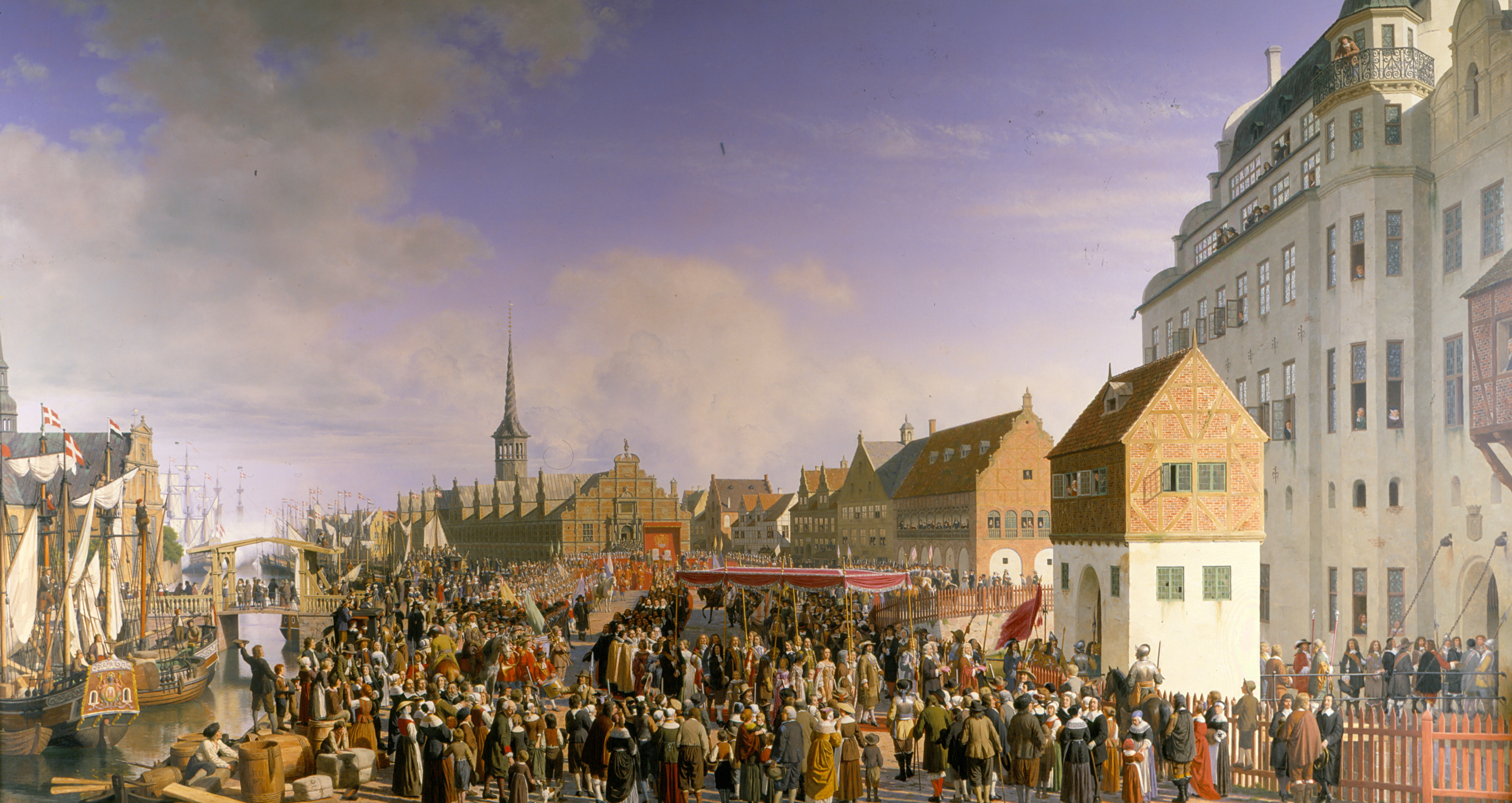
Heinrich Hansen: The Homage of 1770 (1860).

In 1660, he helped apply for the convening of the Assembly of the Estates' Meeting. He was himself elected as one of four representatives of the bourgeoisie in Copenhagen to attend the meeting alongside Hans Nansen, Christoffer Hansen and Hans Pedersen Klein.

On 18 October 1660, he was one of the two citizens, alongside Hans Pedersen Klein, who handed over to the rigshofmester Joachim Gersdorff the bourgeois proposal for the incorporation of the hereditary government. After the introduction of the new absolute monarchy, the king showed him his grace by giving him his picture in diamonds with a gold chain. He was also presented with a carriage by the king. Thuresen was also appointed assessor in the Krigskollegiet.

== Personal life ==
On 29 September 1645, he married to Else Isaksdatter Koritz (died 1673). She was the widow of Christian Flor (died 1645). Her father was tinker (kandestøber) and customs official (kæmner) Isak Corfitzen Choritz (or Thild). The couple did not have any children.

He died in 1675 and was buried in St. Nicholas' Church (destroyed in the Copenhagen Fire of 1795). He bequeathed 7000 sletdlr to charitable purposes in Ålborg and Copenhagen. He was succeeded in office as stadsoberst by Jørgen Fogh.

== Commemoration ==
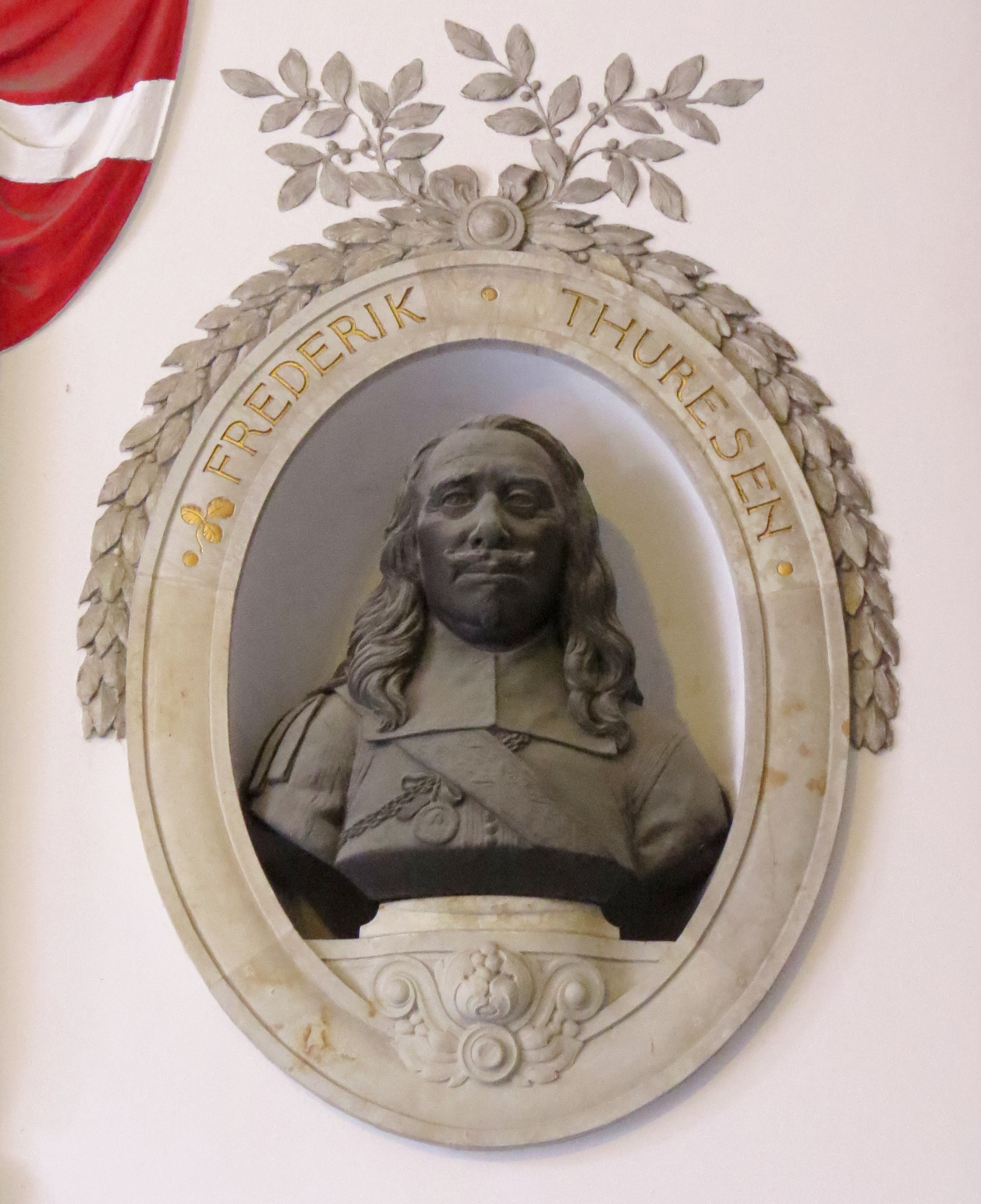
Bust of Thuresen in the King's Gate, Christiansborg Palace.

The street Turesensgade is named after him. The street is located in the Nørrevold Quarter which was created when Copenhagen's bastioned fortification ring was removed in the 1870s. Most of the streets in the area are named after people who played a role in the defence of the city during the Swedish assault on Copenhagen in 1658. The road Thuresensvej was named after Frederik Thuresen in 1948.

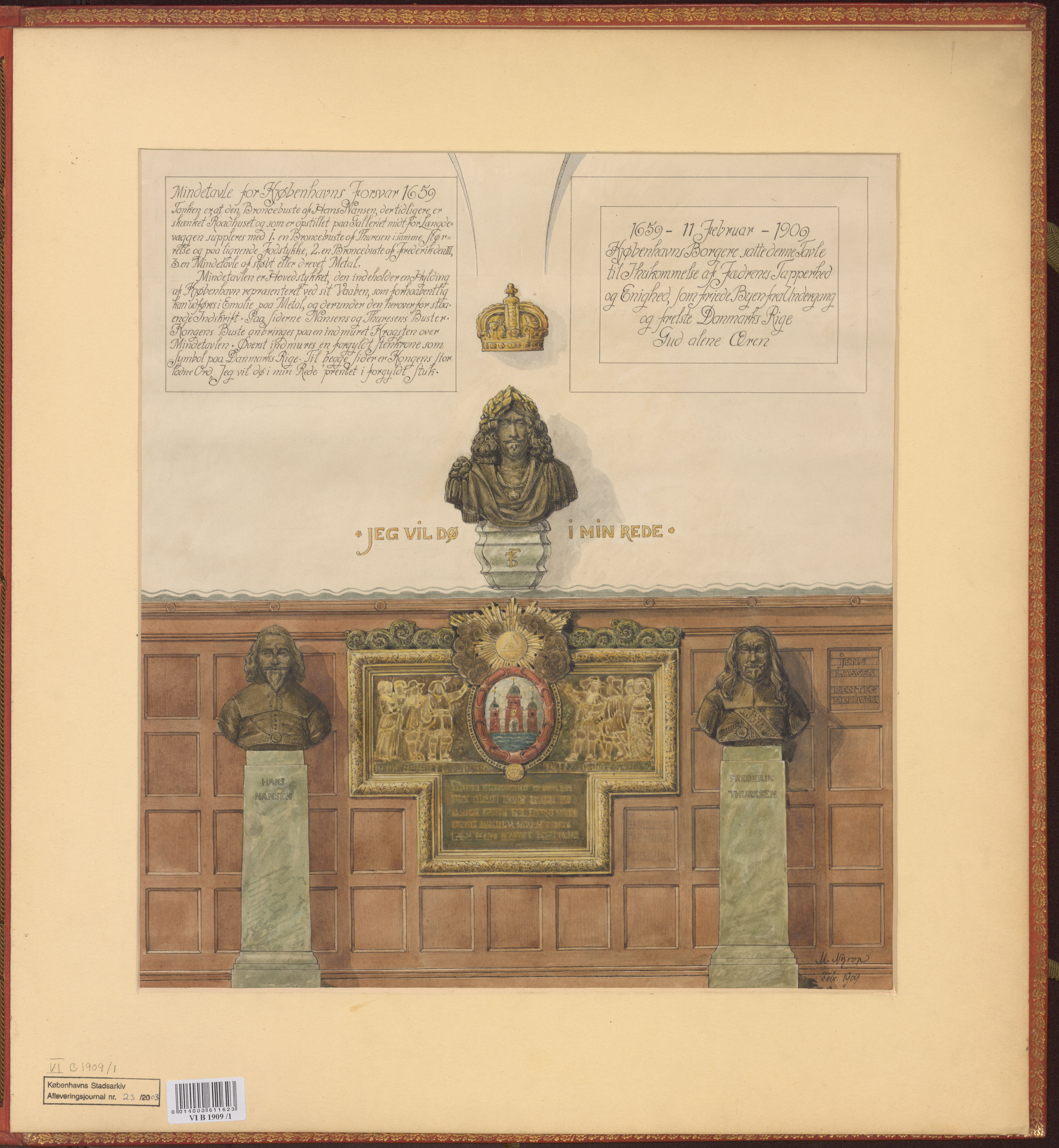
Martin Nyrop's design proposal for a memorial in Copenhagen City Hall.

A bust of Thuresen is seen on Christiansborg's King's Gate. The bust was created by the sculptor Andreas Poulsen. Thuresen is also seen in Heinrich Hansen's monumental oil-on-canvas painting of The Homage of 1669.

In 1909, Martin Nyrop created a design proposal for a memorial to the defence of Copenhagen during the Swedish siege of the city in 1659, for installation in the new Copenhagen City Hall. Its lower part featued the Danish coat of arms flanked by two busts, one of Frederik Thuresen and one of Hans Nansen. The upper part featured a bust of Frederick III, topped by a crown and flanked by inscriptions.
