= Strædet =

Street in Copenhagen, Denmark

Coordinates: 55.6773°N 12.5758°E

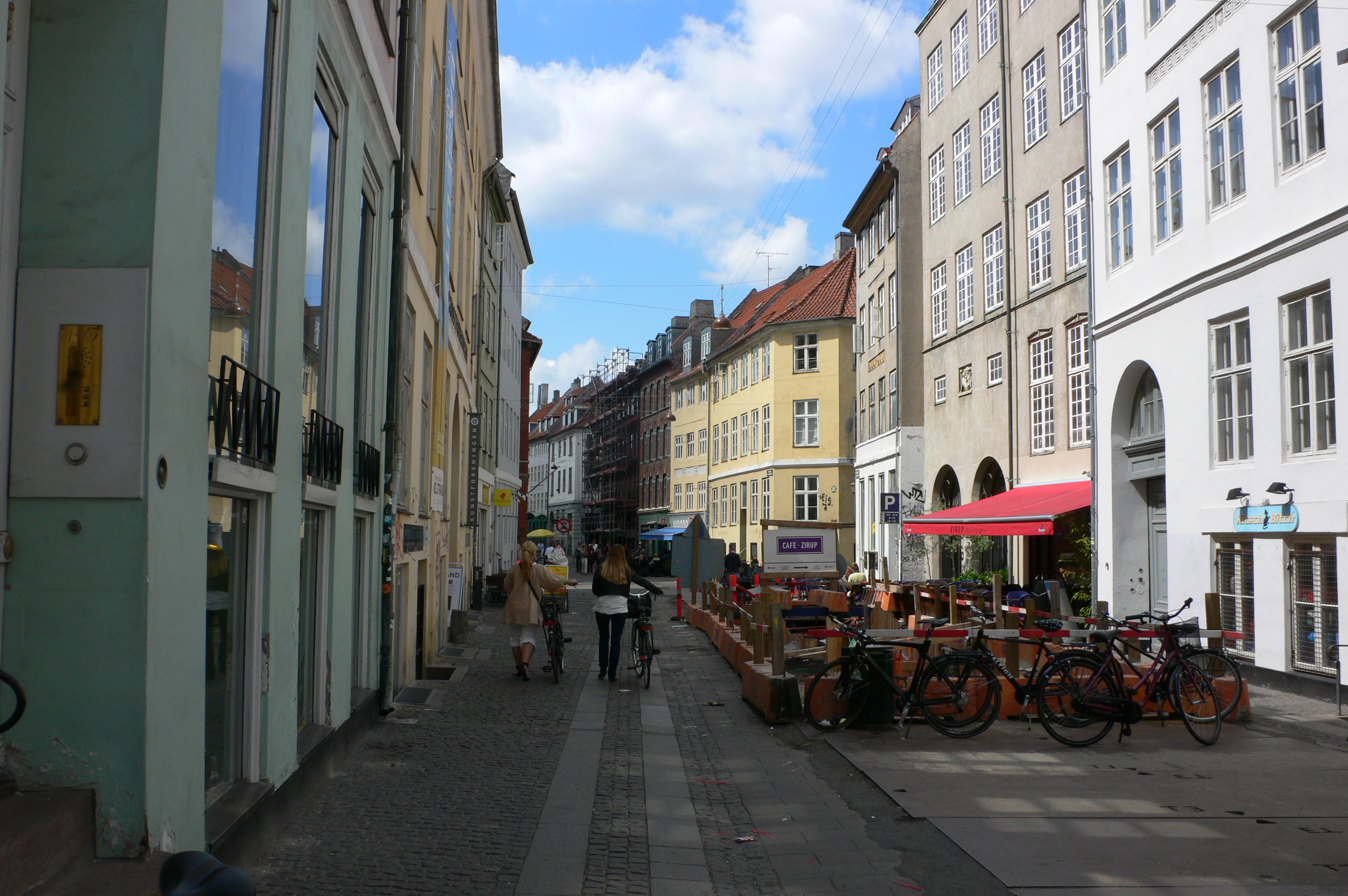
Kompagnistræde

Strædet (literally 'The Alley') is the colloquial name of a popular shopping and café street in the Old Town of Copenhagen, Denmark, linking Højbro Plads on Strøget at its eastern end with Regnbuepladsen next to City Hall to the west. The official street names are Læderstræde (until Hyskenstræde), Kompagnistræde (until Gåsestræde) and Farvergade. The shops along the street are generally smaller and more eclectic than the flagship stores on neighbouring Strøget. It is dominated by art galleries and antique shops. It is known for its rich gay culture with LGBT citizens, shops, bars, restaurants and coffeehouses.

== History ==
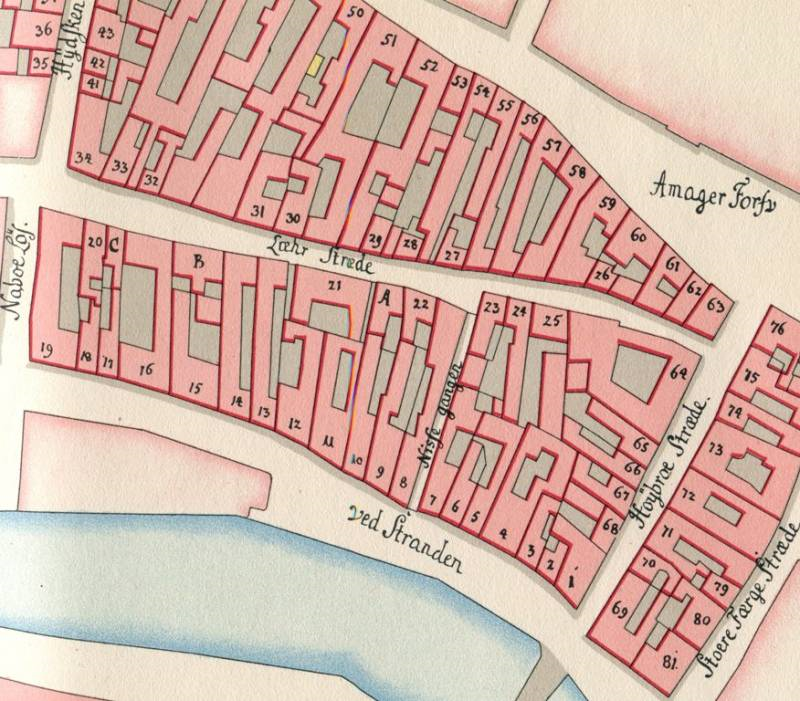
Detail from Gedde's map of Copenhagen showing Læderstræde in the 1750s

Læderstræde originally continued all the way to Rådhusstræde where it turned into Farvergade. The first part of the name Læderstræde does not refer to leather (Danish: læder), as the modern name would suggest, but to Ladbro, a jetty which projected from Copenhagen's first harbor at Gammel Strand. The name is first recorded in 1397 as Laadbrostrede. The name is later seen in the forms Lathbrostrede (1416), Lædherstrædet (1423), Lædærstredhet (1461) and Lederstredet (1475). Det Danske Compagni, later the Royal Copenhagen Shooting Society, was based in a building at No. 16 from about 1447. The Royal Shooting Society moved to a new site outside the Western City Gates in the 1750s. A new synagogue opened in the street in 1764.

Læderstræde was home to many Jewish immigrants from the early 17th century. Copenhagen's opened in Læderstræde in 1729. The building was converted into a public house by restaurateur Christian Berg in 1742 and was subsequently known as Bergs Hus (Berg's House). A small temporary theatre venue opened in the synagogue's former assembly room on 16 April 1848. It was the first of its kind after theatre had once again been legalized following the pietist king Christian VI's death. It later led to the establishment of the Royal Danish Theatre on Kongens Nytorv. In 1765, the first Synagoge in Denmark was built at present day No. 16.

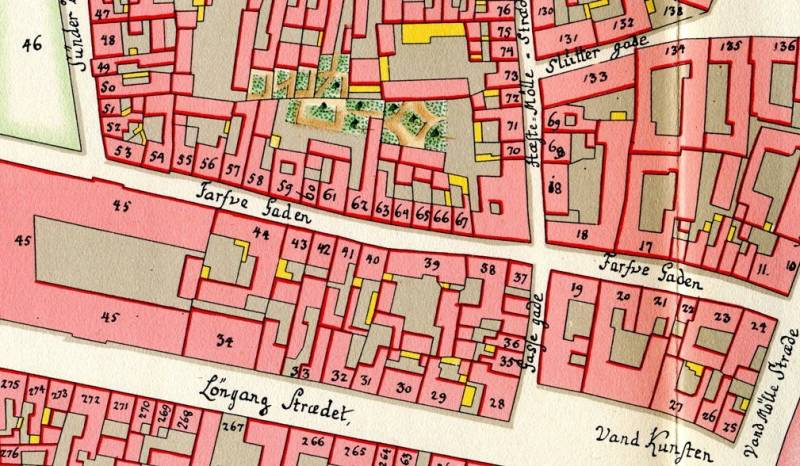
Læderstræde as seen on Copenhagen

Farvergade (literally 'Dyer Street') takes its name from Farvergården, the royal textile dyeing plant, which was located in a courtyard off the street from 1560. Farvergården was later used as a prison before it was replaced by the Vartorv institution in 1665. The old buildings were demolished in the 1720s. The street had an infamous reputation for prostitution until this activity was prohibited in the street in 1884.

Most of Læderstræde was completely destroyed in the Copenhagen fire of 1795 but rebuilt over the next few years. The Great Synagogue was later rebuilt at a new site in Krystalgade. In 1884, the last portion of Læderstræde and the first portion of Farvergade were renamed Kompagnistræde in commemoration of Det Danske Compagnie.

Strædet is especially known for its rich gay culture with many LGBT citizens, shops, bars, restaurants and coffeehouses. In this area, like in most parts of the city, one can kiss and walk hand-in-hand in public without being stared at.

== Notable buildings and residents ==
=== Læderstræde ===
The large property on at the corner of Læderstræde (No. 1) and Højbro Plads (No. 4) is from 1796 to 1797 and was originally built for the publisher Johan Frederik Schultz. It has twenty bays on Læderstræde and nine on the square. The corner bay, which is topped by a small spire, was added in about 1900. The building housed the Ministry of Environment from 1993 to 2014. It has now been converted into apartments and a Moss Copenhagen flagship store.

Other listed properties in Læderstræde that date from the time immediately after the fire are No. 5, No. 7, No. 13, No. 15 and No. 36.

=== Kompagnistræde ===
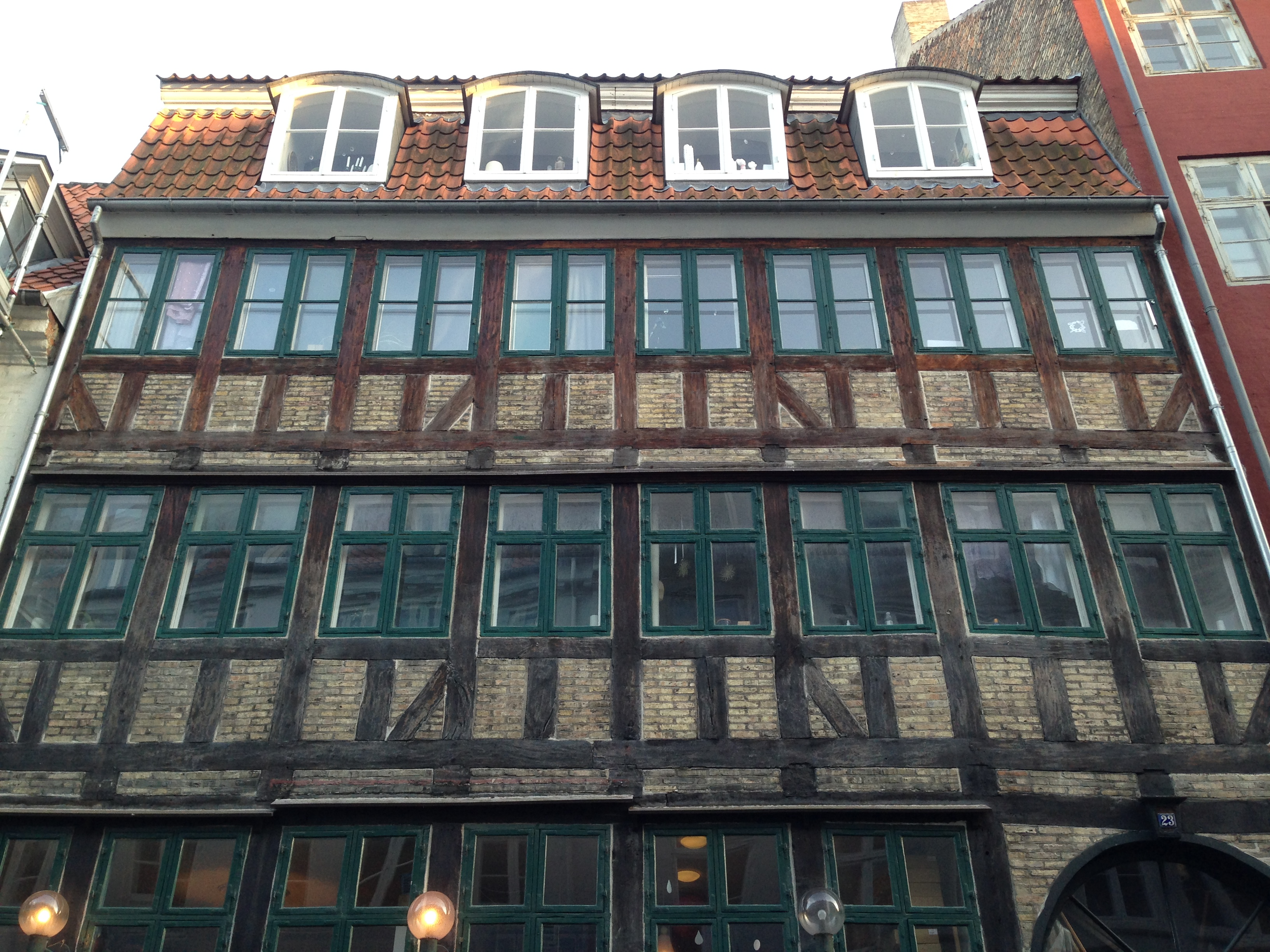
Kompagnistræde 23.

A few of the buildings on Kompagnistræde predate the fire of 1795. The half-timbered building at No. 23 was originally built over two storeys in 1734 but expanded with an extra floor in 1739 and again in 1762. No. 25 is from 1730 but was expanded by one floor in 1837. No. 31 and 33 are from 1734. The building is now home to Tortus Copenhagen, a ceramics studio run by American potter and designer Eric Landon.

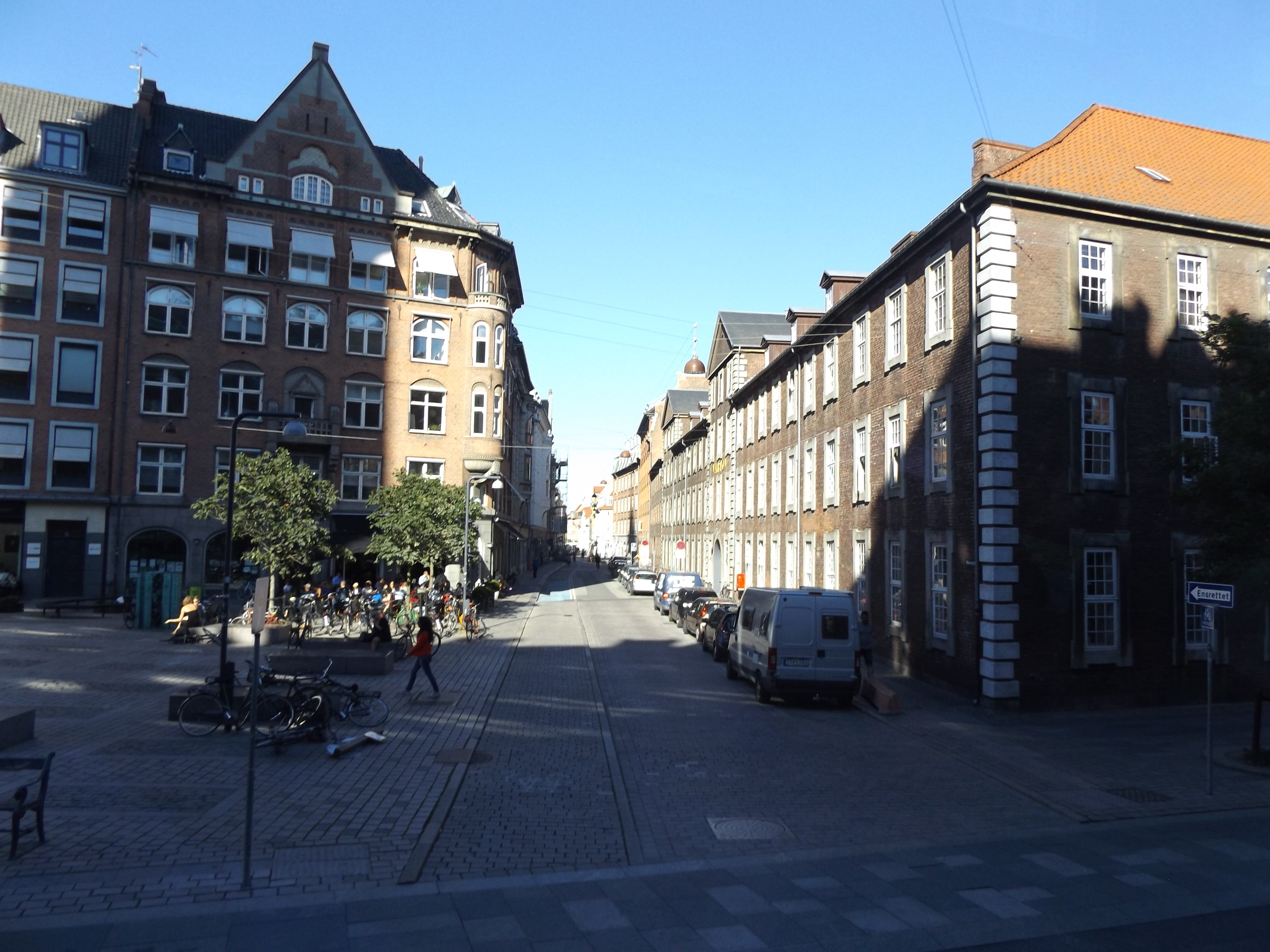
Farvergade viewed from Regnbuepladsen

Most of the other buildings along the street are from the late 1790s and most are listed. Andreas Hallander built No. 16 and 30–32. Johan Martin Quist built No. 19.

The yellow Kompagnihuset building at No. 39 was built as a brewery in 1803. The brewery had until then been located at Vandkunsten 8 on the other side of the block. This building was instead converted into a new residence for the brewer. The two bays to the right date from an expansion in 1850.

=== Farvergade ===
Farvergade is dominated by the large Vartorv complex. The wing on Farvergade was built by Philip de Lange in the 1740s.

== See also ==
- Magstræde
