= Skindergade 21 =

Historical building in Copenhagen, Denmark

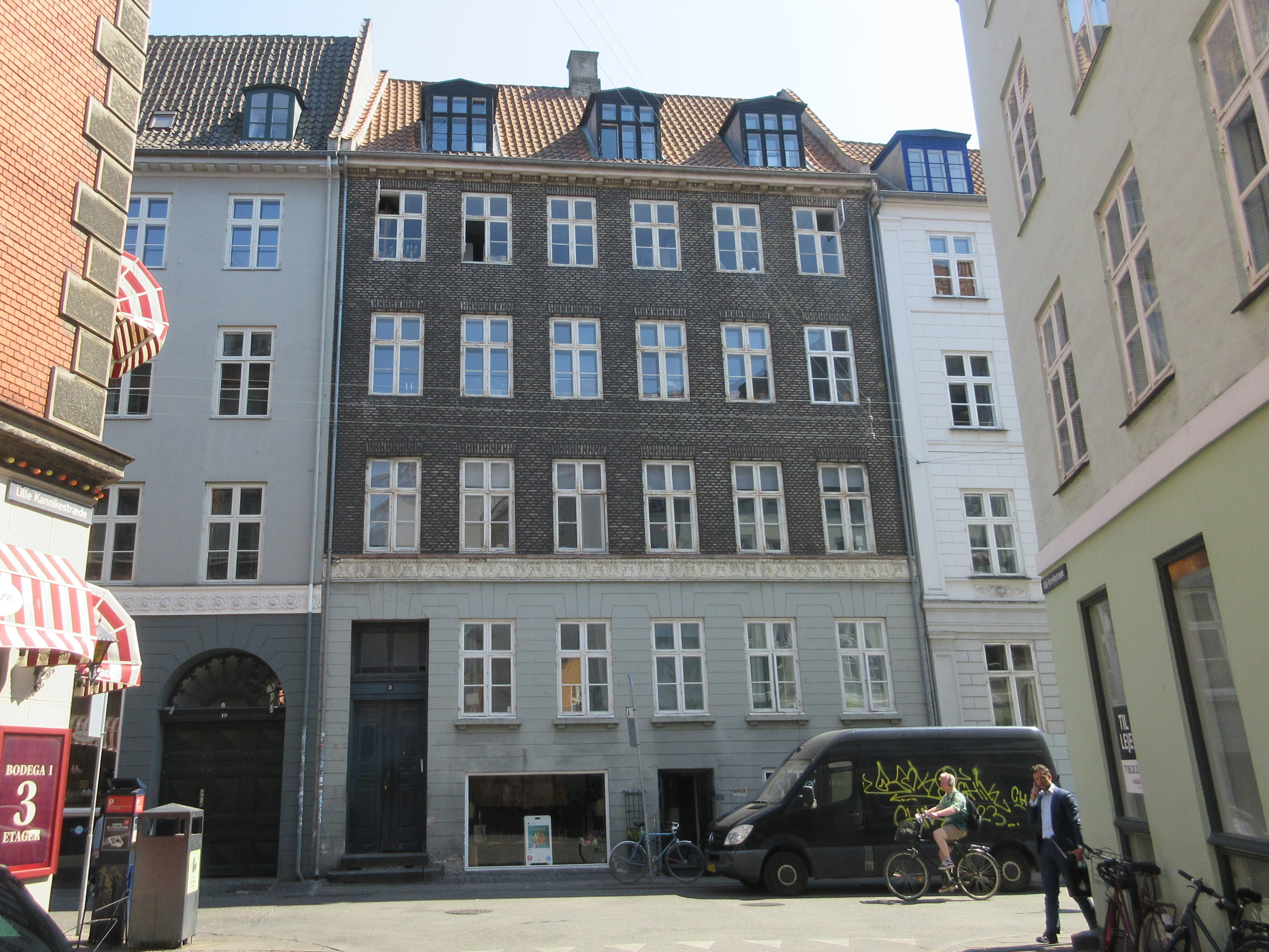
- Interactive map of the Skindergade 21 area

General information
- Location: Copenhagen, Denmark
- Coordinates: 55°40′47.6″N 12°34′29.96″E
- Completed: 1834

Skindergade 21 is a Neoclassical property situated on Skindergade, opposite Lille Kannikestræde, in the Old Town of Copenhagen, Denmark. It was listed in the Danish registry of protected buildings and places in 1964. Former residents include architect Michael Gottlieb Bindesbøll, poet Henrik Hertz, painter Heinrich Hansen and politician Carl Theodor Zahle.

== History ==
=== Site history, 1578–1834 ===
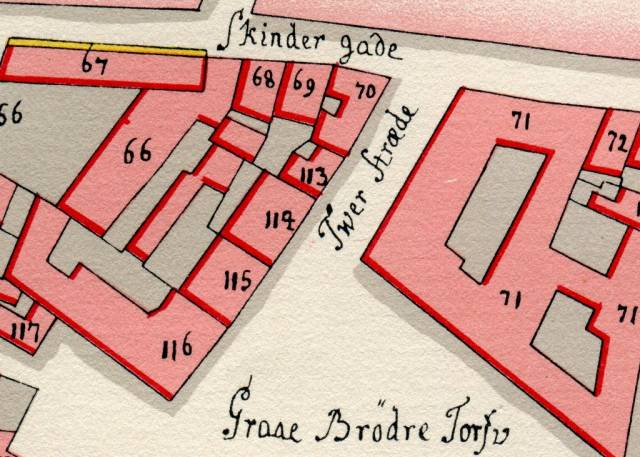
No. 66 and No. 68 seen on a detail from Christian Gedde's map of Frimand's Quarter, 1757.

The site was formerly part of two separate properties. The eastern of these properties was listed in Copenhagen's first cadastre of 1689 as No. 80 in Frimand's Quarter and was owned by klein smith Jens Pedersen at that time. It was listed in the new cadastre of 1756 as No. 68 and belonged to Johan Weltsin. It was listed in the new cadastre of 1806 as No. 39 and was owned by B. Johansen at the time.

The western property was listed as No. 78 in 1689 and was the site of the Brewers' Guild House. It was known as No. 66 from 1756 and listed as No. 94 in the new cadastre of 1806. This property was divided into No. 94A and No. 94B in 1815.

No. 39 was divided into No. 39A and No. 39 B in 1825. No. 30 B was immediately merged with No. 94, No. 96 and No. 40 to form what is now Kehergade 1/Skindergade 10. No. 39A was immediately merged with No. 04B to form No. 39 and 94B (from 1953 simply referred to as No. 39).

=== C. D. Petersen and the new building ===
The present building on the site was constructed in 1833–1834 for C. D. Petersen.

=== 1840–1900 ===
At the time of the 1840 census, the building was home to a total of 34 people. Lorenz Paulsen, a bookseller, resided on the third floor with his wife Marie née Friis, their five children, one lodger and two maids. Henrik Jydhmann, a lawyer (procurator ved Landsretten), resided on the second floor with his wife Hanne Hansen, their two children (aged six and seven), the wife's niece Dorthea Skibsted and a maid. Maria Goldevin, a pensioner, resided on the first floor with her daughter Maria and son-in-law Johan Hanstan, their two sons (aged 17 and 18) and a maid. Christian Raven, cantor at Holmen Church, resided on the ground floor with his wife Claudia Theisen, their three children (aged four to seven), his mother Marie Raven and a maid. Rasmus Hansen and his wife Dorthea née Larsen resided in the basement with their two children (aged three and five) and a maid.

The property was home to 20 people at the time of the 1845 census. It was owned at the time by Else Frederikke Lovise Ahrentzen, a 45-year-old widow. She herself resided on the first floor with her two daughters (aged 15 and 20), her sister Pauline Dorthea Ahrentzen and two maids. Peter Engel Lind, minister of Christianshavn Penitentiary, was also living there with them. Ole Lund (1812–1891), an auditor (1ste kancellist i bureauet for arméens kommandosager), was now residing on the third floor with his wife Adelaide Emilie Lund née Waagepetersen and one maid. Ole Lund was the son of Troels Lund, a merchant in Helsingør. Ole's wife was the daughter of the wealthy wine merchant and patron of the arts, Christian Waagepetersen. Their first son was born later the same year. They moved to Fredericia in 1847. Ole Lund would later be elected to Rigsdagen. Amalia Wegener, widow of a kammerherre, resided on the first floor with two maids. Vilhelm Jørgen Ursin (1815–1871), a master bookbinder, resided on the ground floor with his wife Eleonora Henriette Ussin and three employees/servants. Holger Rosenstand (1814–1868), an unmarried grocer (urtekræmmer), resided in the basement with his apprentice Hans Karl Christian Steen.

Architect Michael Gottlieb Bindesbøll (1800–1856) was a resident of the building in 1849. Author and professor Henrik Hertz (1798–1870) was among the residents in 1851–1852. Painter Heinrich Hansen (1821–1890) was among the residents in 1858–1859.

The property was home to a total of 19 people at the time of the 1860 census. Salomon Philipson, a businessman (grosserer) resided on the third floor with his wife Rosette née Benix, their one-year-old son Sigismund Richard Philipson and a maid. Joseph Frankel, a master shoemaker, resided on the second floor with his wife Terese Frankel, their two children (aged 12 and 20) and a maid. Georg Ludvig Conrad Kjeldsen, a bookseller and librarian, resided on the first floor with his wife Wilhelmine Augusta Kjeldsen née Mortlau, their two children (aged eight and twenty), 24-year-old jurist Philip Rosenstand (who would later serve as mayor of Helsingør), 12-year-old school boy Carls Jørgen Aldo Gyntelberg Rasmussen and a maid. Carl Johan Ludvig Pingel, an employee (handelsbetjent) of grocer (urtekræmmer) C. S. J. Carlsen, resided in the basement with his apprentice Jacob Wiliam Thorvald Petersen and a servant.

=== 1971–1900 ===
Physician F. F. Ulrik (1818–1917) resided in the apartment on the first floor in 1865. Politician Carl Theodor Zahle resided in the apartment on the second floor from 1895 to 1897.

=== 20th century ===
The property belonged to glass-and-porcelain merchant Jens Peter Nielsen (1834-) in 1908.

== Architecture ==
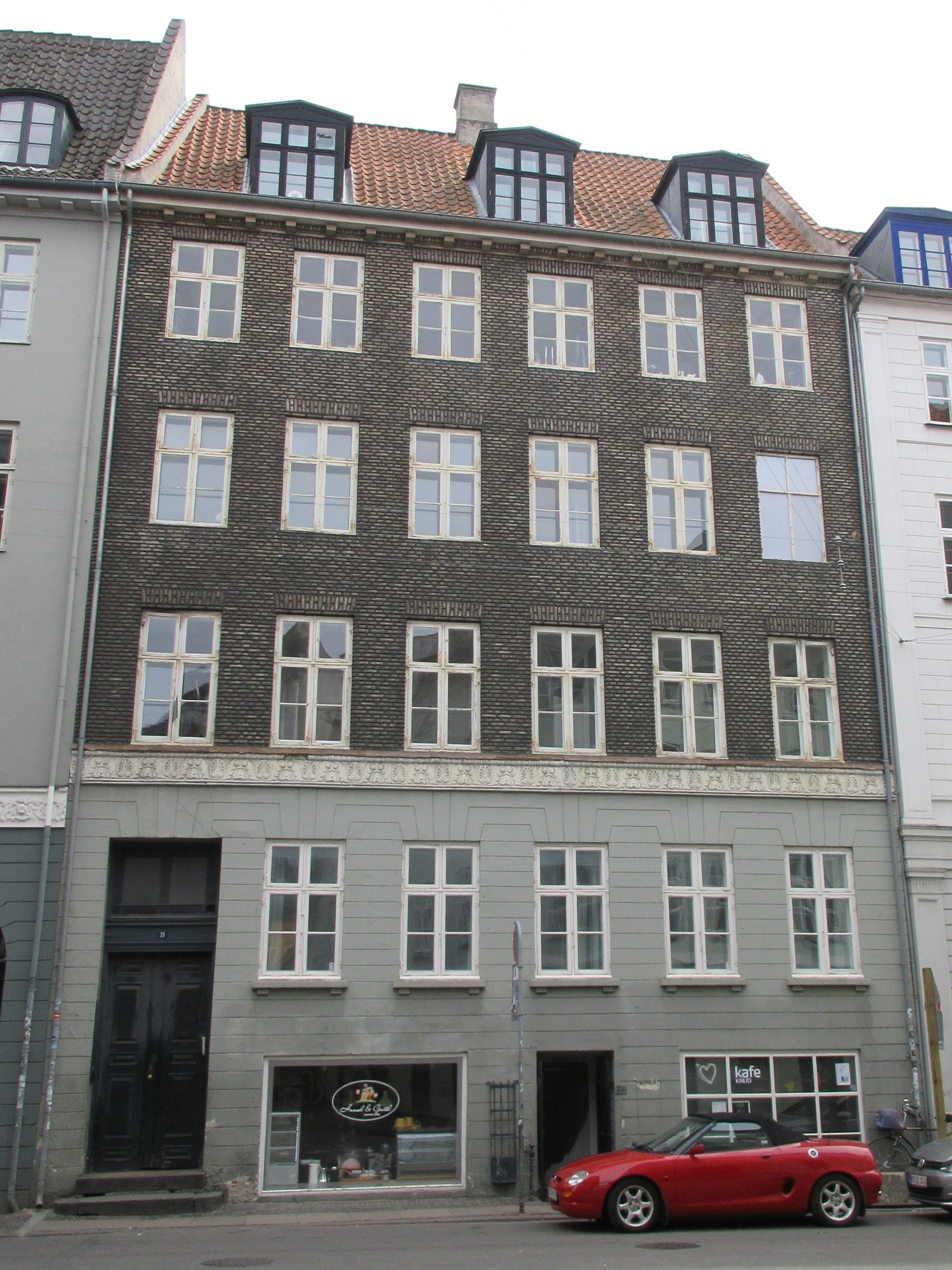
Skindergade 21.

Skindergade 21 is a three-winged complex constructed in brick with four storeys over a walk-out basement. The facade towards the street is plastered and painted grey on the ground floor. The transition to undressed red brick of the upper floors is marked by a belt course with a white-painted relief frieze and there is a modillionned cornice below the roof. The main entrance in the bay furthest to the left (east) is topped by a large transom window with coloured glass. The basement in the fourth bay has two two-bay display windows. The ground floor windows have substantial sills supported by corbels. The roof ridge is pierced by a chimney and it features three dormer windows towards the street.

The complex occupies an irregularly shaped site. A short perpendicular wing, with two diagonal bays towards the yard, attaches the main wing to a short rear wing. The façades facing the yard are plastered yellow on the ground floor and iron vitriol yellow on the upper floors. These secondary wings have a monopitched red tile roof pierced by a substantial kitchen chimney.

== Today ==
Skindergade is currently owned by E/F Skindergade 21. It contains a retail space in the basement and one condominium on each of the upper floors.
