= Heinrich Hansen =

Heinrich Hansen is the name of:

- Heinrich Hansen (painter) (1821-1890), Danish architectural painter
- Heinrich Hansen (theologian) (1861-1940), German theologian
- Adolf Heinrich-Hansen, painter
