= Kompagnistræde 23 =

Building in Copenhagen, Denmark

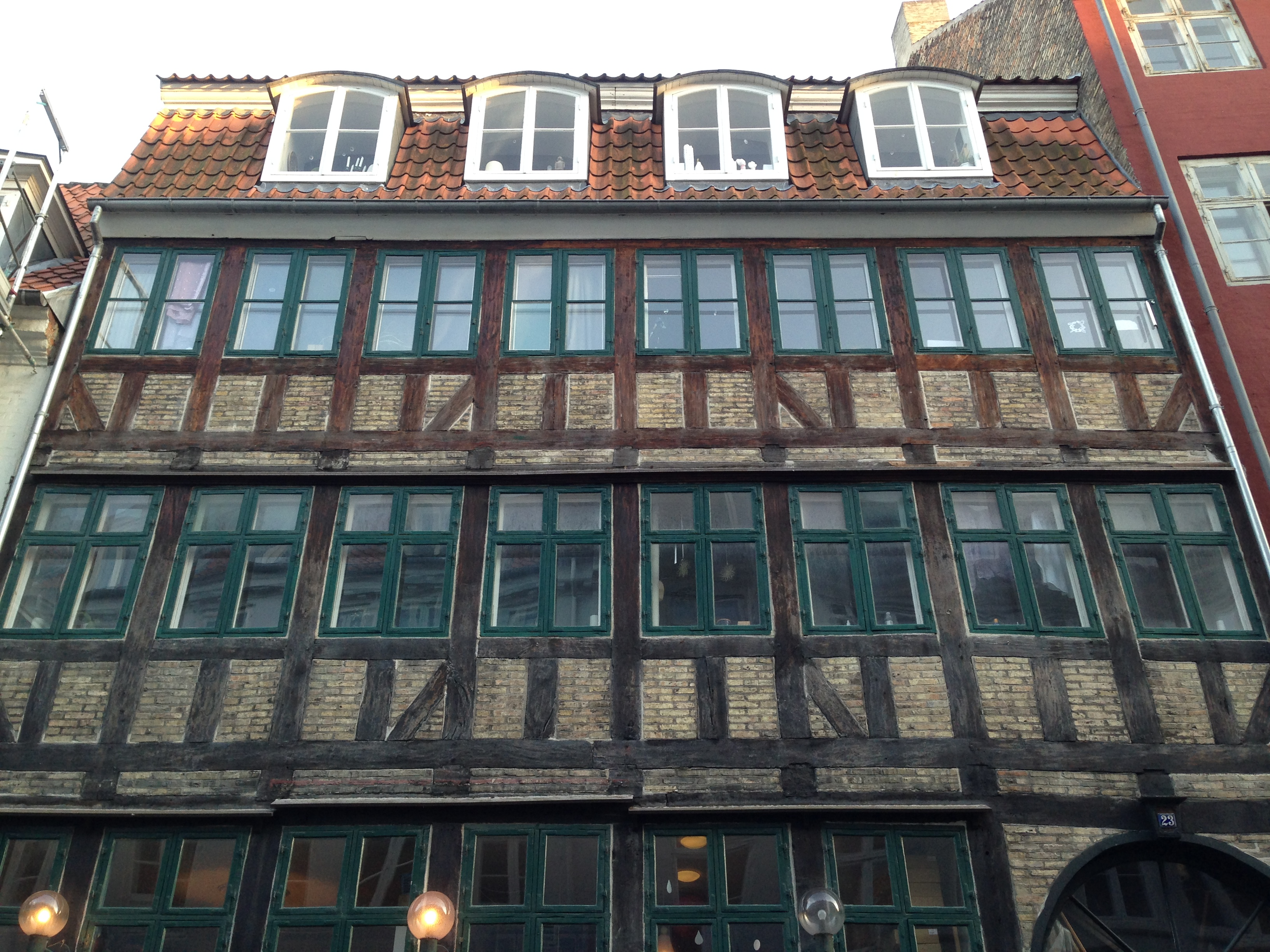
- Interactive map of the Kompagnistræde 23 area

General information
- Location: Copenhagen, Denmark
- Coordinates: 55°40′36.73″N 12°34′30.4″E
- Completed: 1734

Kompagnistræde 23 is a timber-framed property situated on the shopping street Strædet between Knabrostræde and Rådhusstræde in the Old Town of Copenhagen. Constructed in 1734 as part of the rebuilding of the city following the Copenhagen Fire of 1728, it is one of the oldest buildings in the street. It was listed in the Danish registry of protected buildings and places in 1918. Former residents include the naval officer Lorentz Fjelderup Lassen, Tortus Copenhagen, a ceramics studio, is now based in a rear wing.

== History ==
=== 18th century ===
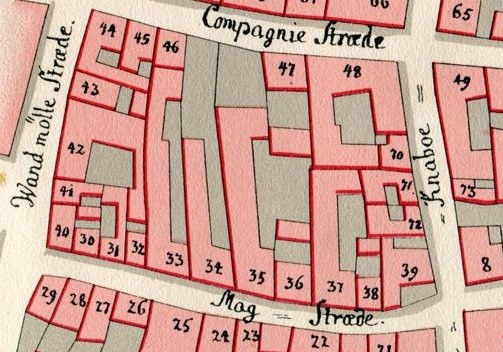
No. 47 seen on a detail from Christian Gedde's map of Snaren's Quarter, 1757.

The property was listed as No. 51 in Snaren's Quarter (Snarens Kvarter) in 1689, owned by distiller Anders Søgaar, The current building on the site was constructed in 1734 for blacksmith Thomas Sørensen. The property was listed as No. 47 (new number) and owned by glazier Johan Gabe by 1756.

At the time of the 1787 census, No. 47 was home to 22 people in four households. Friderich Irrgang, a glazier, resided in the building with his wife Sophie Amalia Irrgang (née Hiordt), their three daughters (aged two to five), two children from his first marriage (aged eight to 11), a glazier, two glazier's apprentices and two maids. Carolina Mathiesen, a 72-year-old unmarried woman, resided in the building with one maid. Lorentz Fjelderup Lassen, a naval officer, then with rank of first lieutenant, resided in the building with his wife Heelene Charlotthe Lassen and a maid. Engel Cathrine Fischer, a 55-year-old unmarried woman, resided in the building with three other unmarried women (aged 28 to 37) and one maid.

The magistrate had in 1784 appointed Irrgang as alderman of the Glaziers' Guild in spite of the fact that he had only received two votes in the election and another candidate (Claussen) had received 14 votes. In 1787, he was succeeded by Johan Barklay. Johan Barklay had received 11 votes in the election versus seven votes for Irrgang.

=== 19th century ===
On Friderich Irrgang's death, Sophie Amalia Irrgang married for a second time, to glazier Abraham Vesterberg. At the time of the 1801 census, No. 47 was home to a total of 24 people in three households. Abraham Vesterberg and Sophie Amalia Irrgang resided in the building with the two youngest daughters from Irrgang's first marriage, three employees in the glazier's business (one of them an apprentice) and one maid. Another household consisted of Sophie Amalia Irrgang's mother Johanne Marie Ebbesen(aged 68), her three brothers (aged 23 to 28) and two sisters (aged 20 and 30), three lodgers and two maids. A third household consisted of Danish Chancery courier Peter Saxe, his wife Marie Cathrine Knudsen, their 17-year-old son Henrich Saxe (student), the lodger Lars Jessen (student) and one maid.

The property was listed as No. 49 in the new cadastre of 1806. It was still owned by Abraham Westerberg at the time.

In 1817–1818, Lorentz Fjelderup Lassen—now retired and with the title of counter admiral—once again lived in the building. His next home was at Nytorv 19.

At the time of the 1840 census, No. 40 was home to a total of 29 people. Friderich and Sophie Amalia Irrgang's youngest daughter Ane Dorthea Irrgang had married the glazier Gustav Wilhelm Korck and they were now residing in the rear wing with their three children (aged 15 to 21), Irrgang's sister Jacobine Caroline Irrgang, a glazier, two apprentices and one maid. Peter Anton Manderlot, a retired krigsråd, resided on the ground floor with his wife Bolette Catrine Ebbesen and their 25-year-old daughter Thomine Jacobine Manderlot. Three unmarried siblings resided together on the first floor. Sisters Dorethe Mariane Clausen (aged 37) and Ida Catrina Clausen (aged 33) were both working as seamstresses. Their 23-year-old brother Edvard Julius Clausen was a goldsmith. A 53-year-old widow lodger also lived there with them. Ludvig Haupt, a type founder (skriftstøber) working for Berling, resided on the second floor with his wife Marie Charlotte Herring, their three children (aged one to five) and one maid. Hans Larsen, a 35-year-old master shoemaker, resided in the basement with his wife Ane Christine Andersen, their two children (aged one and three), a 17-year-old foster son and Larsen's brother Niels Larsen.

At the time of the 1860 census, No. 49 was home to just 14 people. Ferdinand Wilhelm Korck, the eldest son of Gustav Wilhelm Korck and Ane Dorthea Korck (née Irrgang), had taken over his father's glazier's business in the rear wing. He lived there with two apprentices. His sister Olivia Marie Frederike Korck resided on the ground floor with a maid. Ernstine Winkelhorn and Frederikke Nicoline Geus, two widows (aged 73 and 71), resided on the first floor with one maid. Louise Frederikke Kjærstrup, a 78-year-old widow, resided on the second floor with her 51-year-old daughter Adelheid Rosalie Kjærstrup (music teacher). The unmarried sisters Anna Hedevig Thomsen and Ulrikke Eleonora Thomsen (aged 78 and 77) were also residing on the second floor with one maid. Hans Larsen, the shoemaker from the 1840 census, was still residing in the basement with his wife Anne Christine Larsen, three daughters (aged seven to 21) and an apprentice.

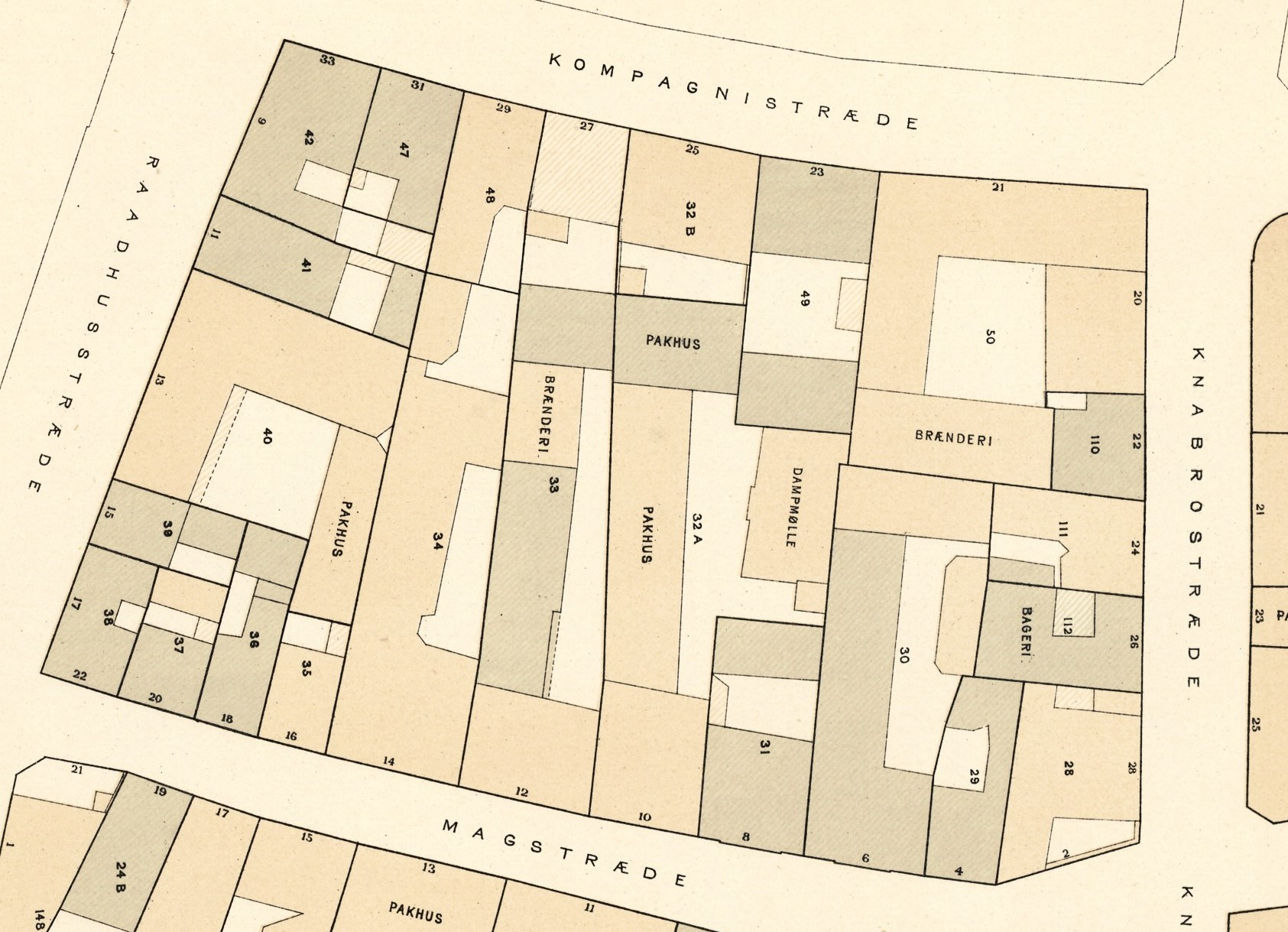
Knabrostræde 28 seen on a detail from Berggreen's cadastral map of Snaren's Quarter, 1884.

At the time of the 1880 census, Kompagnistræde 23 was home to 13 people. Magdalene Madsen, the 69-year-old owner of the property, resided on the first floor of the rear wing with her son Nikolai Cleophas Madsen. The son was a glazier. The now 58-year-old Olivia Marie Frederikke Korck was still residing on the ground floor of the front wing. Christiane Meisler, a 71-year-old pensioner, resided on the first floor. Rosalia Jetzmark and Vilhelmine Dahlman, two unmarried women in their 60s, resided on the second floor. Johan Friederich Redke, a shoemaker, resided in the basement with his sister Jeanette Johanne Dorthea Redke. August Martin Christian Novack, a coachman, resided on the second floor of the rear wing with his wife Hanne Novack, their one-year-old daughter Anine Georgine Novack and one maid.

=== 20th century ===
The property was acquired by master joiner Johannes A. Smith in the second half of the 20th century. His firm was founded on 3 July 1967 and dissolved on 30 June 2003.

== Architecture ==
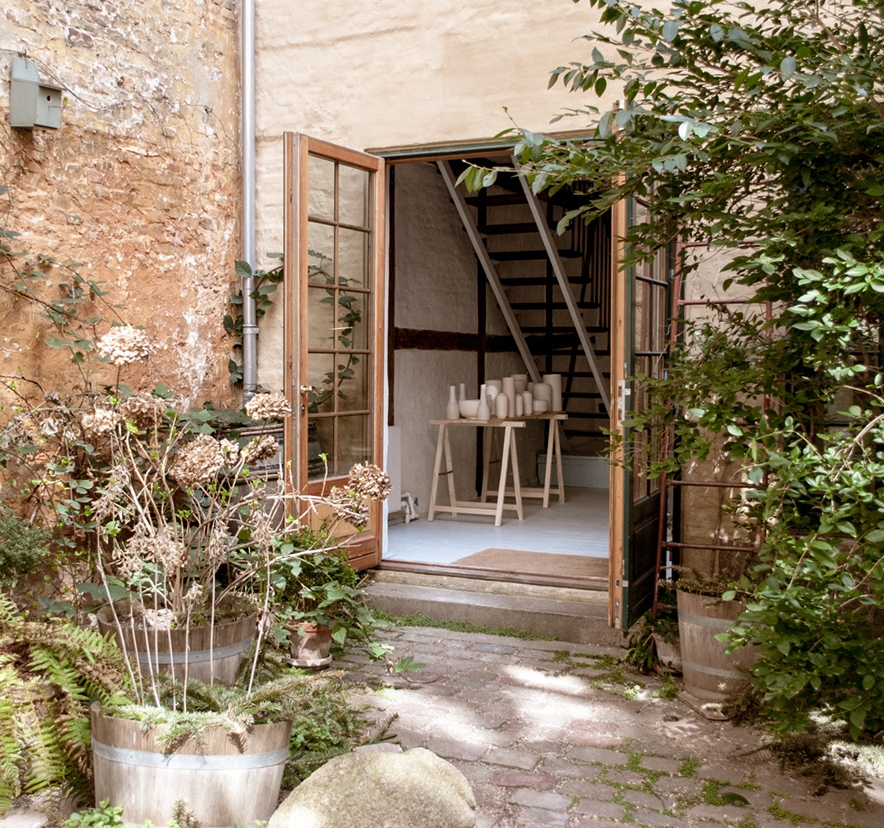
The studio at Kompagnistræde 23 in Copenhagen

The building was originally constructed with two storeys over a walk-out basement and was then topped by a pitched roof with a four-bay gabled wall dormer. The roof was replaced by a full third storey and a mansard roof between 1739 and 1869. The timber framing of the old part of the building is oak while pine timber was used in the construction of the newer third storey. The gate in the two bays furthest to the right (west) is topped by a fanlight and the name Johs. A. Smith is written on the transom. A basement entrance is located in the bay furthest to the left (east). The mansard roof is clad with red tile and features three dormer windows towards the street and two towards the yard.

== Today ==
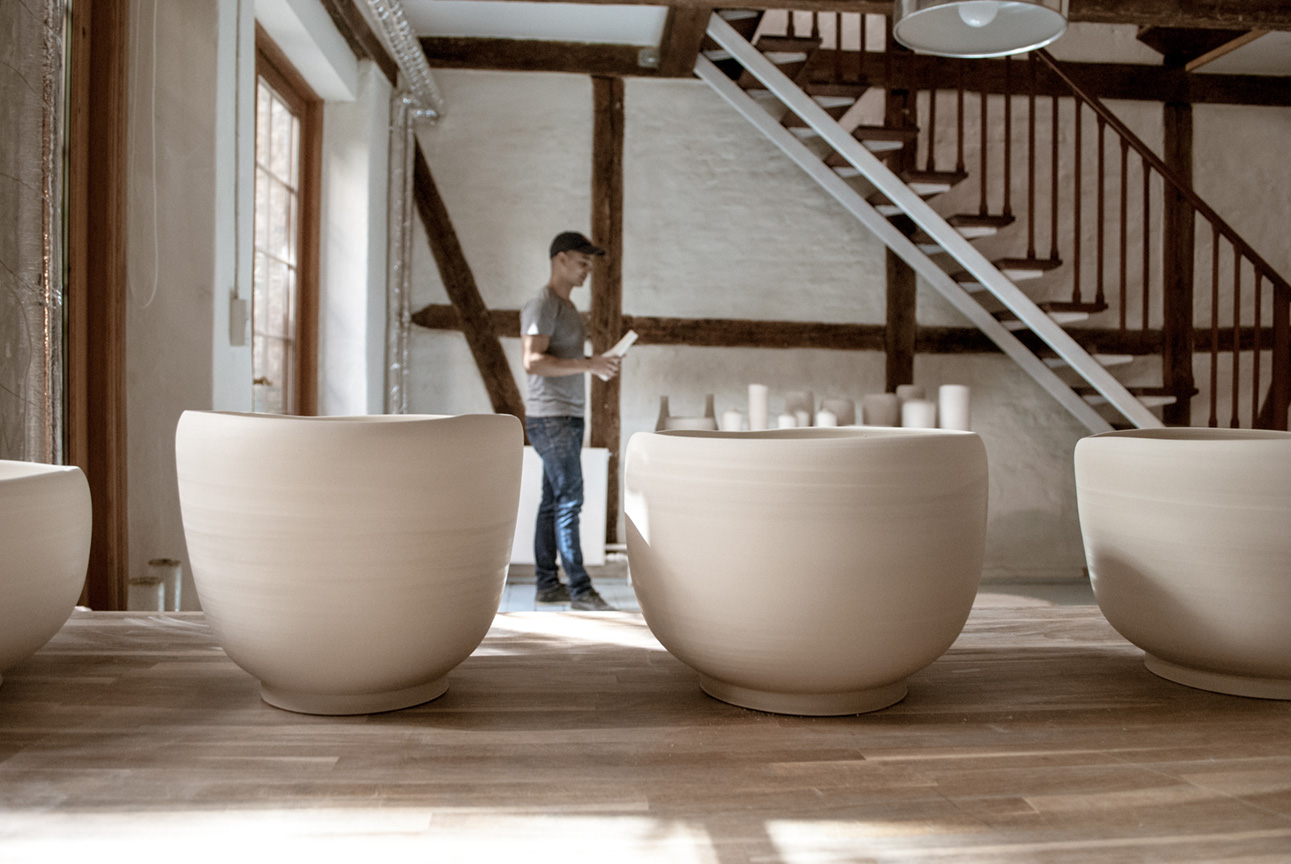
Eric Landen at work in the Tortus Copenhagen studio loft

The building was owned as of 2007 by Peniila and Tanguy Lavoriette. Peniila Anastasia Laviolette (née Smith) was the daughter of Johannes and Margit Smith. She died in 2020. Tanguy Lavoriette, a French-born landscape architect, works for the Agency for Culture and Palaces.

Tortus Copenhagen, a ceramics studio founded by American ceramics artist Eric Landon, his brother Justin Landon and Karin Blach Nielsen, is now based in the rear wing.

== Gallery ==
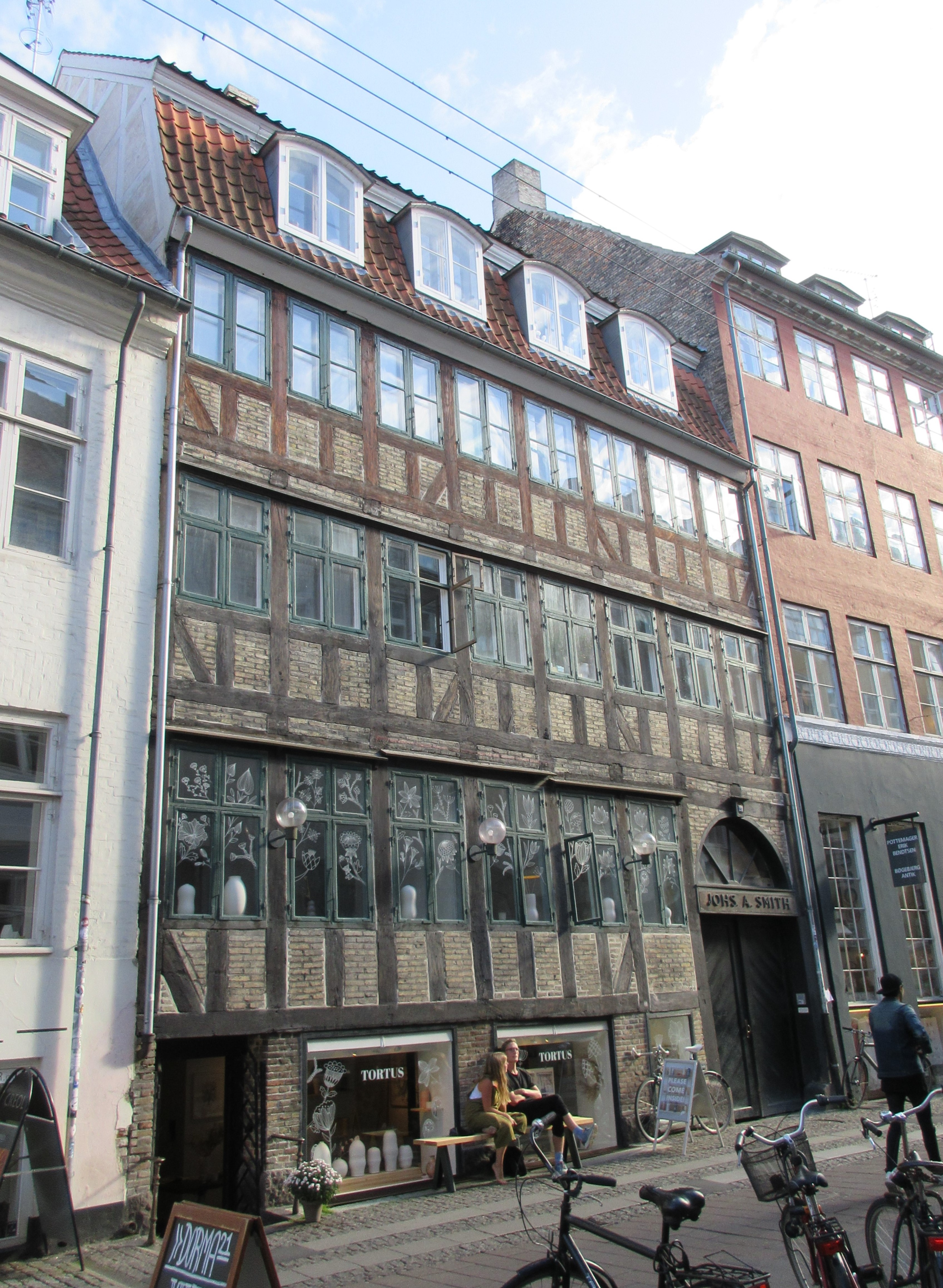
