= Jørgen Fogh =

Danish Supreme Court justice and mayor of Copenhagen (1631–1685)

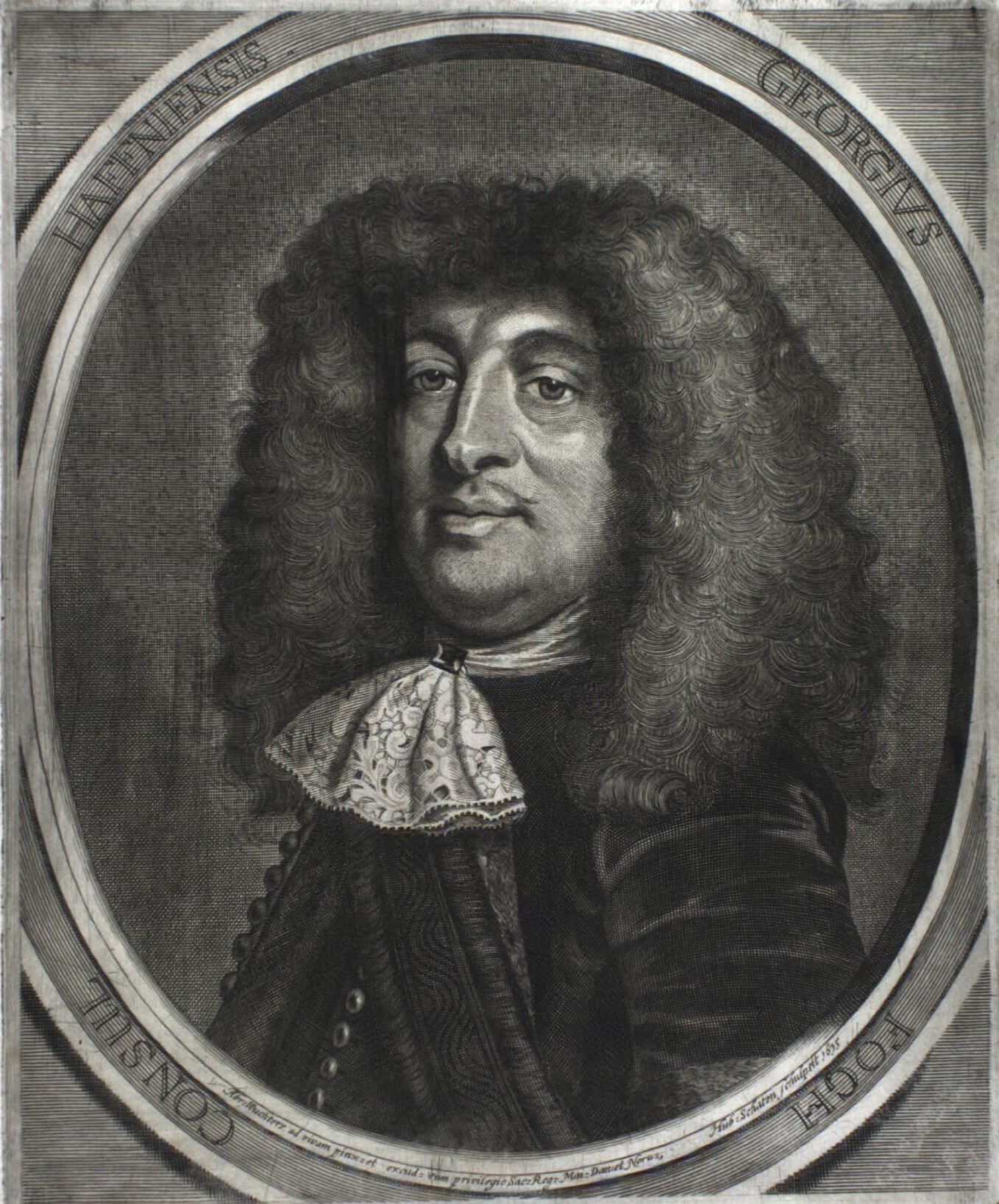
Jørgen Fogh.

Jørgen Fogh (1631–1685) was a Danish Supreme Court justice and mayor of Copenhagen. His career was strongly favoured by his marriage to Peder Schumacher Griffenfeld's sister. After Griffenfeld's fall from power, Fogh was also prosecuted. He lost his posts and spent his last years in exile in Aarhus.

== Early life ==
Fogh was born in Aarhus to merchant Laurids (Lars) Fogh (d. 1656) and Anne Jørgensdatter. He completed his secondary schooling in 1762. In 1658, he went on a Grand Tour with Knud Thott.He acquired a Doctor of Law degree abroad.

In 1668, he married Karen Schumacher (c. 1644–1700). She was the daughter of wine merchant Joachim Schumacher (1604–1650) and Maria Motzfeld (1613–1693) and the sister of Peder Griffenfeld.

== Career ==
In 1667, Fogh became councilman in Copenhagen. In 1668, he became burgermaster. In 1675, he succeeded Frederik Thuresen as stadsoberst. In 1670, he became a Supreme Court justice. He was also a member of the Law Revision Commission (lovrevisionskommissionen).

== Trial and later life ==
In conjunction with Griffenfeld's arrest, Fogh was also arrested and prosecuted. After the trial, he was sent in exile in Aarhus. He was buried in Aarhus Cathedral.
