= Eric Landon =

American ceramics artist and designer

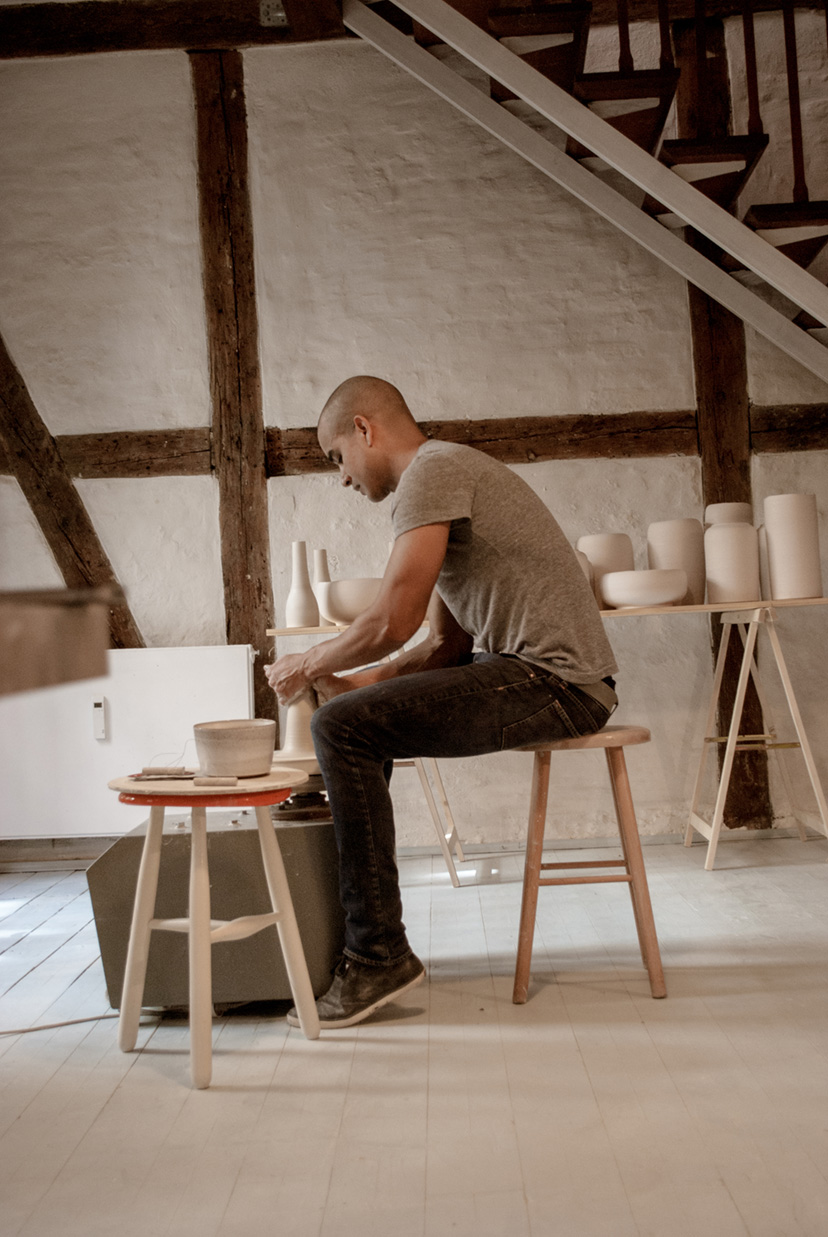
Eric Landen at work in the Tortus Copenhagen studio loft

Eric Landon (born 1976) is an American ceramics artist and designer. He is a co-founder of the Tortus Copenhagen ceramics studio in Copenhagen.

== Early life and education ==
Landon was born in 1976 in Milwaukee, Wisconsin. He has worked with ceramics since he was 16 but initially studied economy at Xavier University in Cincinnati before moving to Denmark in 1999 where he graduated from the Danish School of Design in 2007.

== Tortus Copenhagen ==
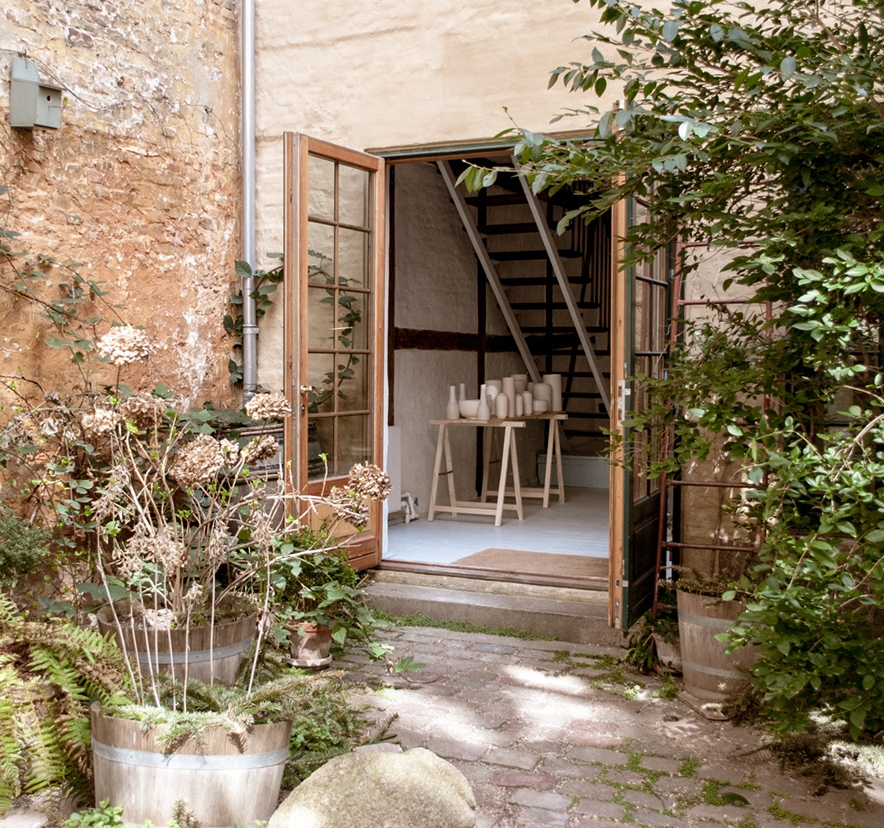
The studio at Kompagnistræde 23 in Copenhagen

Tortus Copenhagen was founded by Eric Landon, and his brother Justin Landon, The studio is based in an 18th-century, truse-style building in a courtyard off Kompagnistræde (No. 23) in central Copenhagen.

Landon also offers workshops in his studios for those interested in learning his techniques and putting them to use. Starting in the fall of 2017, he began traveling abroad to different studios in the United States and Australia to offer similar workshops. He visited New York, Los Angeles, Portland, San Francisco, and Chicago. In 2018, he will visit Brisbane, Canberra, Perth, Sydney, Adelaide, Torquay, Melbourne and Auckland.

== Awards ==
In 2015, Landon was awarded the Danish Design Award for Craftsman of the Year.
