= Johan Frederik Schultz =

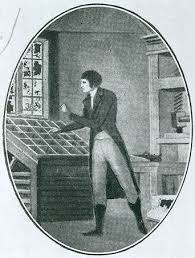
- J. F. Schultz at work
- Born: 1 March 1756; Odense, Denmark
- Died: 28 November 1817 (aged 61); Copenhagen, Denmark
- Occupations: Printer, publisher

Johan Frederik Schultz (1 March 1756 – 28 November 1817) was a Danish book printer and publisher.

== Biography ==
Schultz was born in Odense. After completing an apprenticeship as a book printer in 1777, her moved to Copenhagen where he was employed at the Berlingske publishing house. In 1783, he established his own company after acquiring a small printing business. The company moved into a building on Højbro Plads in 1787 and Schultz was appointed to Royal Book Printer in 1789.

Schultz was also on good terms with many prominent writers, including Knud Lyne Rahbæk, C. Pram, T. Thaarup, R. Nyerup and Jens Baggesen. He published much of the Danish fiction of his time as well as several journals, including Minerva and Den danske Tilskuer. Among his most notable publications was an edition of Ludvig Holberg's Niels Klim in Baggesen's translation from 1789 with illustrations by Nicolai Abildgaard.

Schultz's building on Højbro Plads was destroyed in the Copenhagen fire of 1795. He immediately acquired a publishing house in Skindergade from P. M. Høpfner, who was both responsible for publications from University of Copenhagen and the Court. Schultz moved his business back to Højbro Plads when a new building had been completed in 1797 and it soon developed into one of the largest Danish publishing houses om Copenhagen. Among Schultz's most important publications from this period was Rahbek's edition of Holberg's complete works which was published in 21 volumes between 1804 and 1814.

Schultz became a wealthy man who owned several properties in and near Copenhagen. He was a member of the Royal Copenhagen Shooting Society. He died in 1817 and is interred in Assistens Cemetery.

== Legacy ==
Schultz's widow was after her husband's death granted permission to keep his privileges and ran the company until her death. It was then passed on to her son by her first marriage, Jens Nicolai Christian Hostrup S. (1782–1849) and later to his descendants.

Schultx's building on Højbro Plads (No. 4) still exist. It was listed in 1945.
