= Højbro Plads =

Public square in Copenhagen, Denmark

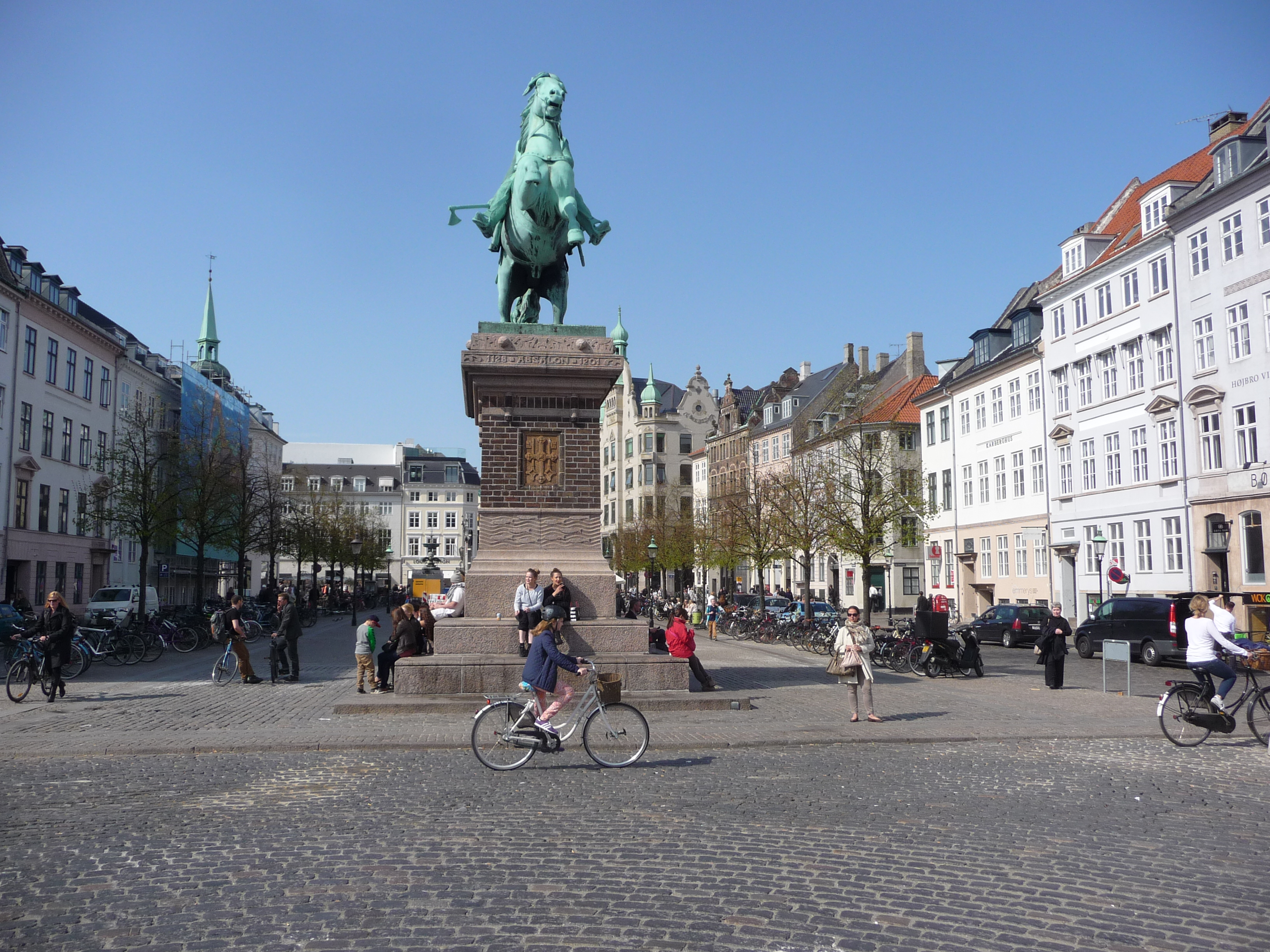
- Højbro Plads seen from Slotsholmen
- Length: 89 m (292 ft)
- Location: Indre By, Copenhagen, Denmark
- Postal code: 1200
- Nearest metro station: Gammel Strand
- Coordinates: 55°40′42″N 12°34′48″E

Højbro Plads (literally "High Bridge Square") is a rectangular public square located between the adjoining Amagertorv and Slotsholmen Canal in the City Centre of Copenhagen, Denmark. It takes its name from the Højbro Bridge which connects it to the Slotsholmen island on the other side of the canal while Gammel Strand extends along the near side of the canal.

The most striking feature of the square is an equestrian statue of Absalon, the warrior-bishop who has traditionally been credited as the founder of Copenhagen. It was inaugurated in 1901 to commemorate the septcentennial of his death.

== History ==
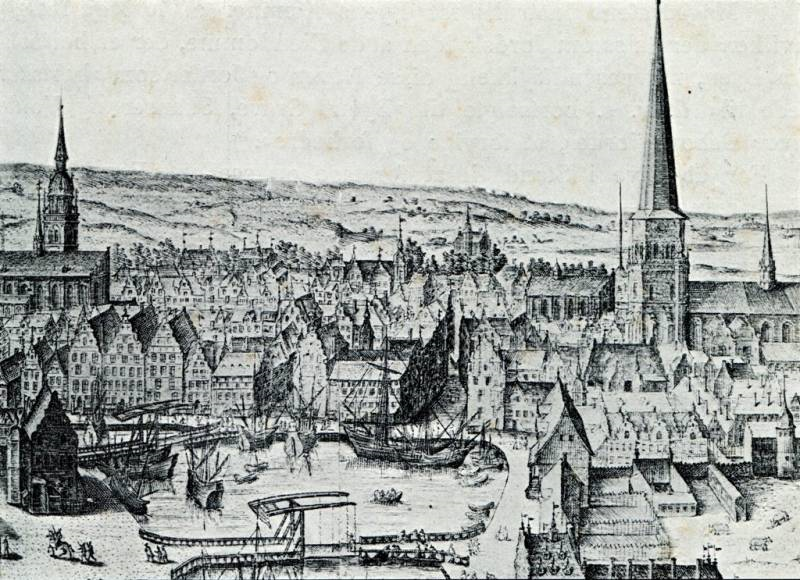
Detail of drawing of Copenhagen showing the dense neighbourhood which was located at the site before the square was established

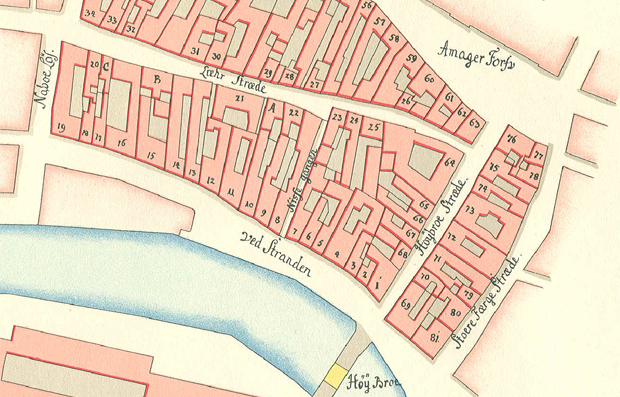
The site before the square was created as seen on Gedde's district map from 1756

A relatively new square, Højbro Plads was laid out following the Great Fire of 1795. Prior to the fire of 1795, Højbro Plads was the site of a dense block bounded by Højbrostræde to the west and Store Færgestræde to the east. The former connected Amagertorv to Højbro Bridge and Slotsholmen. The fire completely destroyed the area between present day Strøget and the canal. City architect Jørgen Henrich Rawert subsequently created a masterplan for the rebuilding of the area. Højbro Plads was laid out to create a fire break and in the same time contribute aesthetic qualities to the area. Most of the buildings lining the square date back to the years immediately after the fire.

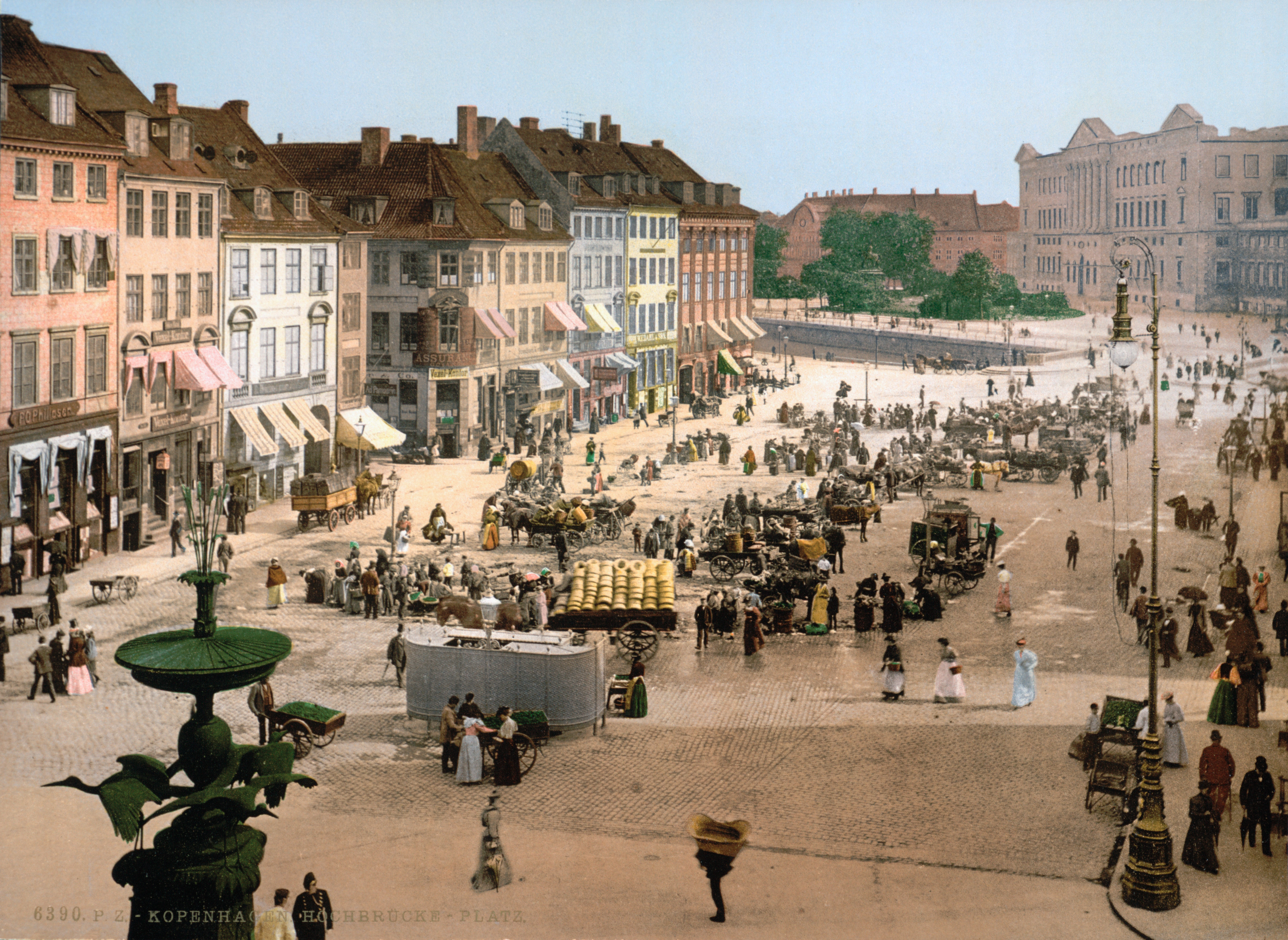
The square c. 1890.

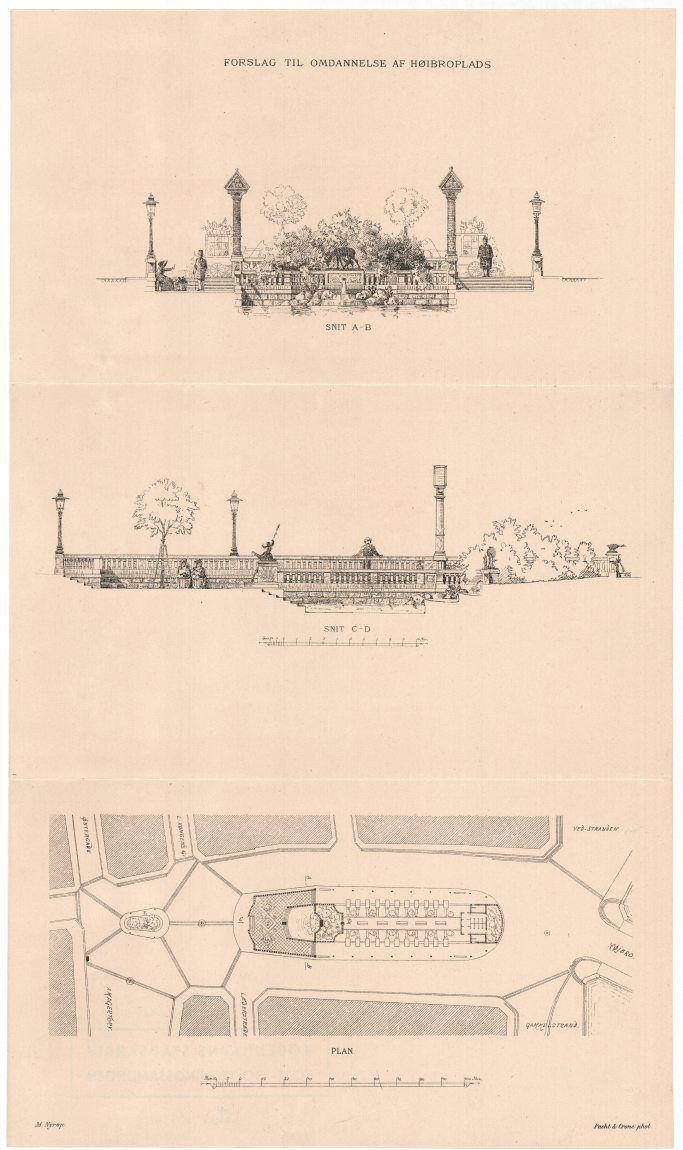
Martin Nyrop's 1900 proposal

Up through the 19th century the vegetable and flower market on Amagertorv spread to the new Højbro Plads. The butchers were referred to the nearby Nikolaj Plads.

Martin Nyrop created a proposal for a new design of the square in 1900 but it was not realized. It was instead refurbished in 1995. The 22 lime trees on the square was planted in 1998 as the result of a private donation. Their placement on the square has been criticized by former city architect Otto Käszner.

== Architecture ==
=== Background ===
Most of the buildings lining the square are examplars of the Neoclassical architecture which characterized the building boom following the fire and dominate much of the city centre seen today. Recurrent features are accented windows with triangular frontons supported by consoles, recessed joints, and friezes, usually above the second floor, decorated with patterns such as a Greek key or a Vitruvian scroll. The friezes were sold as standard goods and could be bought by the metre from the stucco workshops.

Trained architects were at this time only used for public prestige buildings and townhouses for the elite, while normal residential buildings were designed by the master craftsmen who built them. To promote good taste and diminish the gap between architecture and Vernacular buildings, Johann Friedrich Struensee had launched an initiative in the Royal Academy of Fine Arts to encourage such builders to take supplementary classes in drawing so as to develop the notion of "good taste". The building boom resulting from the Great Fire of 1795 greatly profited from this initiative. Caspar Frederik Harsdorff had also been commissioned to build a house on Kongens Nytorv, today known as Harsdorff's House, which was to act as a model and source of inspiration for builders in their work. Some of the houses on Højbro Plads, like many in the surrounding streets, bear clear traces of influence from this house.

=== Notable buildings ===
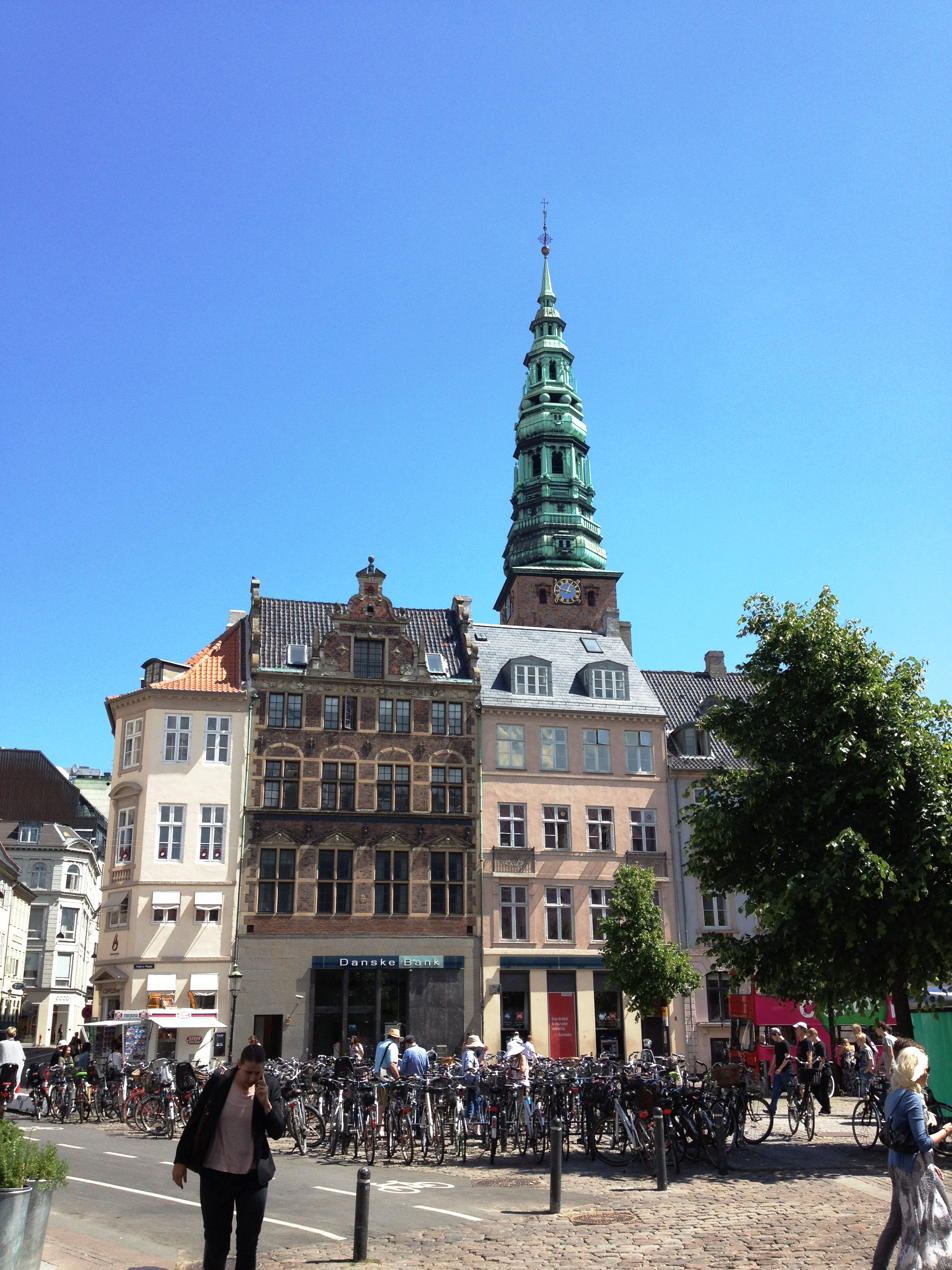
Højbro Plads No. 5 and 7. The spire of St. Nicholas Church is seen in the background.

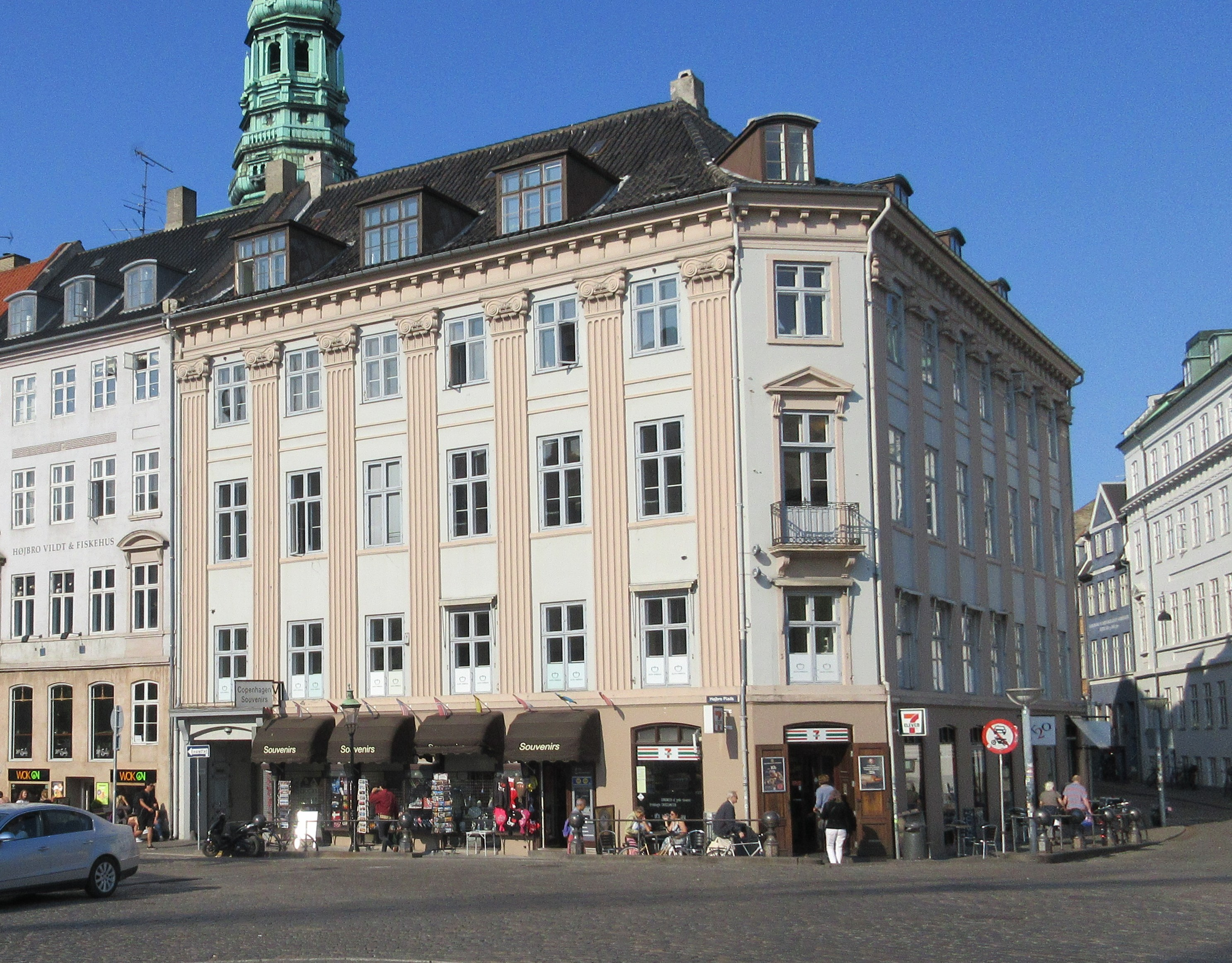
No. 21: The Ploug House

The building at the corner with Store Kirkestræde (No. 3) is called Warburg's House and was built in 1799 by Aron Leon Warburg, a wealthy merchant and manufacturer of stockings. The neighbouring building at No. 5 was adapted to a Neo-Renaissance style by Martin Borch in 1897. The two houses flanking Lile Strandstræde (No. 9-11 and 13) and No. 15 are also listed, Neoclassical houses from the late 1790s. Both No. 19 and No. 21 were built by Andreas Hallander, one of the most active builders of the period. The latter, known as Ploug House, located on the corner with Ved Stranden, was given a more monumental facade than those of the other houses on the square to make it better match Christiansborg Chapel on the other side of the canal. The pilaster motifs are in such numbers that they dominate the entire building and are not limited to a single section of the façade, as was seen in Harsdorff's House.

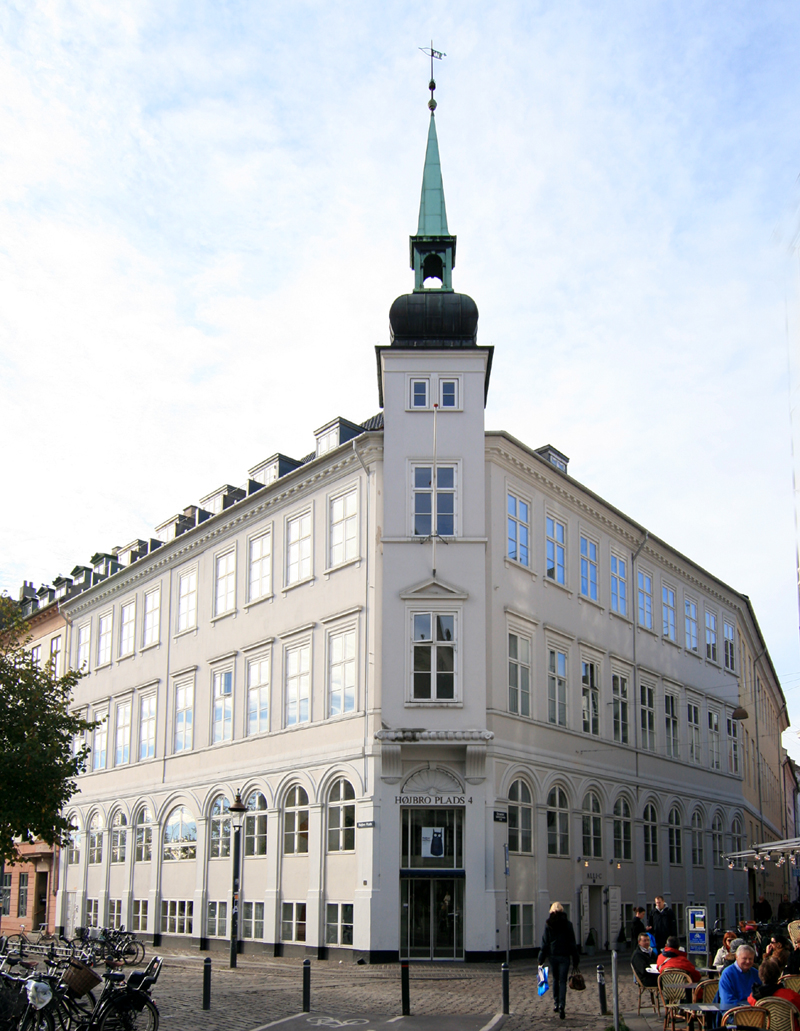
No. 4: Former home of Johan Frederik Schultz's printing business

The large property at No. 4 on the other side of the square, at the corner of Læderstræde, is from 1796 to 1797 and was originally built as a new headquarters for Johan Frederik Schultz's printing business. It has 9 on the square and 20 bays on Læderstræde. The corner bay is topped by a small spire which was added in about 1900. The building housed the Ministry of Environment from 1993 to 2014. It has now been converted into apartments and contains a Moss Copenhagen flagship store in the ground floor. The five-bay house at No. 6 was built in 1804–06 by Niels Schønberg Kurtzhals for silk and textile merchant Lorentz Andreas Hinrichsen. The four-bay house at No. 8 was built for another silk and textile merchant, Nikolaj Abraham Kall. The building at the corner of Gammel Strand (No. 10) is the former headquarters of the insurance company Kgl. Brand. The building was originally designed by Fritz Koch but completed after his death by Gotfred Tvedein 1906æ It now houses the law firm Johan Schlüter .

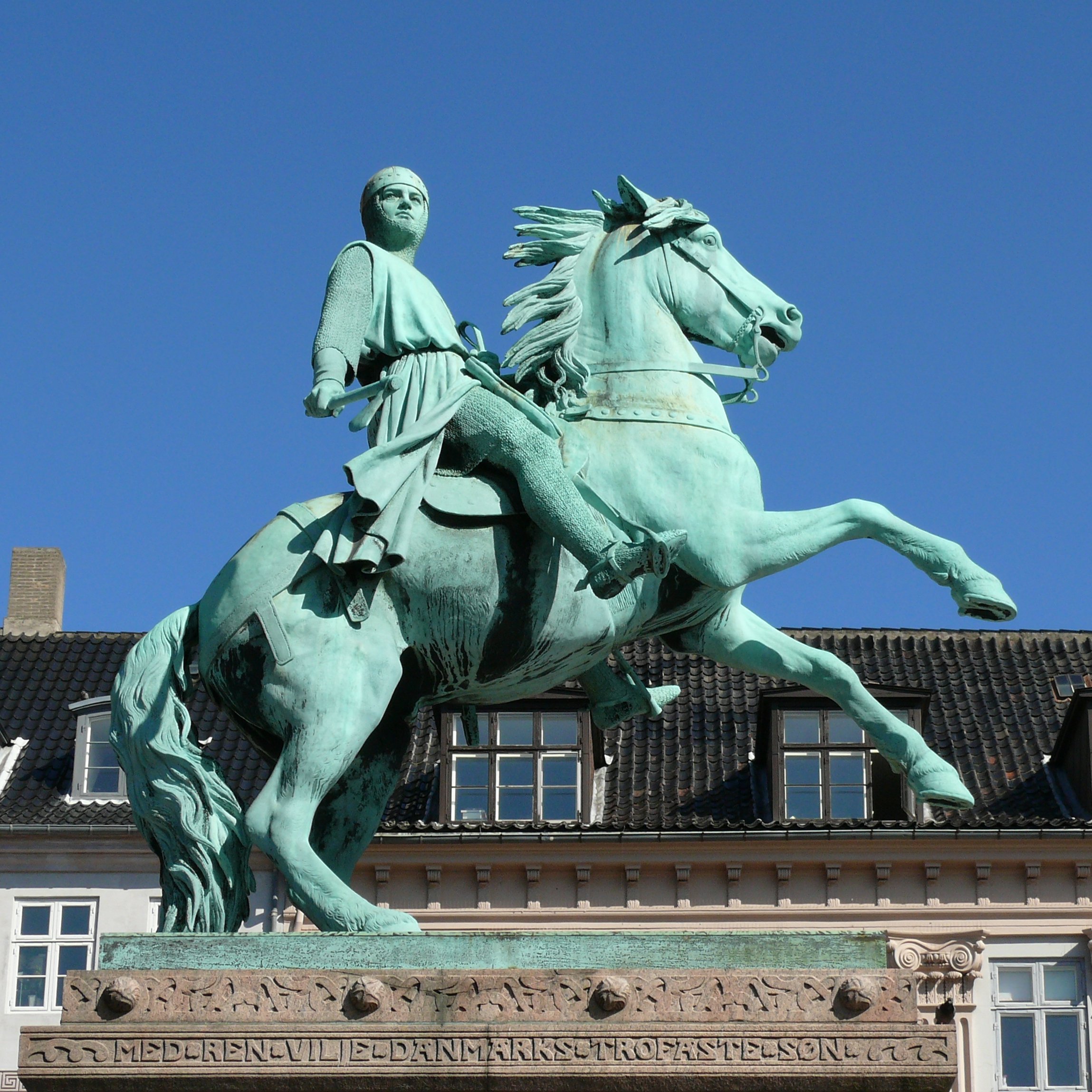
The equestrian statue of Absalon

== Absalon Statue ==
The equestrian statue of Absalon was designed by Vilhelm Bissen. It depicts Absalon as a military commander, mounted on a rearing horse, wearing a mail, holding an axe in his right hand, and looking towards Christiansborg Palace on Slotsholmen where he built his castle in 1167.The statue stands on a high plinth which was designed by Martin Nyrop.
