= Heinrich Hansen (theologian) =

German Lutheran theologian (1861-1940)

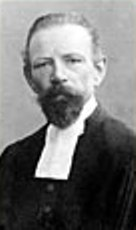
Heinrich Hansen

Heinrich Hansen (13 October 1861 – 17 April 1940) was a German Lutheran theologian and the father of the Lutheran High Church movement in Germany.

Hansen was born in Klockries near Lindholm (in present-day Nordfriesland) as a son of a teacher. In Kiel and Erlangen he studied theology, Hebrew, Syriac, Arabic and in particular the Old Testament under August Klostermann. He worked since 1887 as a pastor in Schleswig-Holstein: in Reinfeld, Lindholm, on the island Pellworm, in Kropp and in Olderup near Husum.

Hansen wrote Latin hymns and worked on a Low German Bible translation and published a Low German hymnal. By the study of the old Lutheran theologians, particularly Martin Chemnitz, and the Roman Catholic theologian Johann Adam Möhler, he came to an Evangelical Catholic view about church. In the Reformation jubilee year of 1917—exactly 100 years after Claus Harms— Hansen published 95 theses (Stimuli et Clavi) in Latin and German, as a sharp criticism against contemporary Protestantism. His theses influenced the foundation of "Hochkirchliche Vereinigung" in October 1918. Hansen is well known as a co-founder and the first chairman of Hochkirchliche Vereinigung. He died in Breklum.

== Works ==
- Die Oden Salomos in dt. Nachdichtungen, 1911;
- Lauda Sion Salvatorem. Cantica Latina, 1913;
- Psalmbook. Dat heet Christelige Leeder för sassische Lüd, 1916 (verm. 19192);
- Stimuli et clavi i. e. theses adversus huius temporis errores et abusus. Spieße u. Nägel ... (1917), in: Hochkirche 1, 1919; 8, 1926; 11, 1929; and in: Eine Hl. Kirche, 1957/58;
- Die Lehre v. der sichtbaren Kirche in luth. Bedeutung, in: Una Sancta 2, 1926, 386 ff.;
- - Verfall u. Wiederaufbau der Kirche, in: Eine Hl. Kirche 10, 1928, 240 ff. 259 ff.;
- Universale Kirche. Ein Wort z. Nachdenken an alle Christen, in: Hochkirche 16, 1934, 67 ff.;
- Johanneisches Zeitalter, ebd. 21, 1939, 272 ff.;
- Die Ref. in ihrer Bedeutung f. die gesamte Kirche, ebd. 22, 1940/41, 293 ff.
