= Heinrich Hansen (painter) =

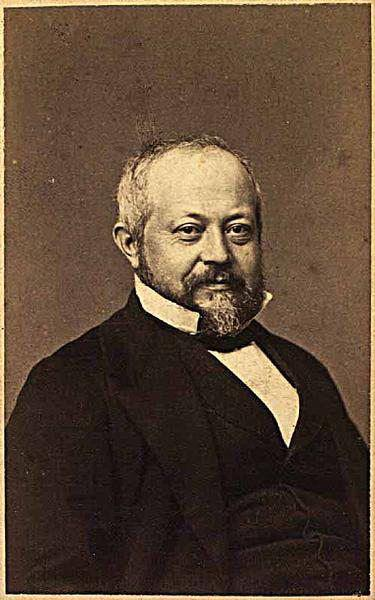
Heinrich Hansen; photograph by Budtz Müller og Co.; Bredgade 21 (1880)

Heinrich Hansen (23 November 1821, Haderslev – 10 July 1890, Frederiksberg) was a Danish architectural painter and State Councillor. His son, Adolf Heinrich-Hansen, was also an architectural painter.

== Biography ==
His father was a cloth dyer who originally came from Flensborg. After some time as a journeyman painter, he went to Copenhagen in 1842 to enroll at the Royal Danish Academy of Fine Arts with the intention of becoming a decorative painter. Before the year was out, he had begun assisting with the decorations at the Thorvaldsen Museum. He also attended the modeling classes and won a silver medal in 1846 for his live model painting. The following year, together with Wilhelm Marstrand, he helped create decorations for the burial chapel of King Christian IV at Roskilde.

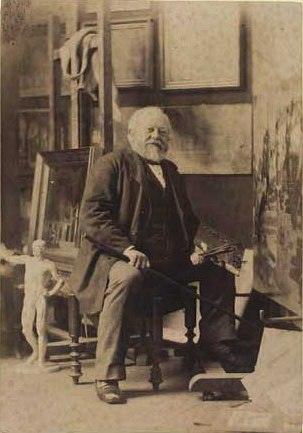
Hansen in 1883

In 1847, he was awarded money from the Reiersenske Fund, which provides grants to artists and craftsmen. This enabled him to study in Germany. During his time there, he decided to be an architectural painter; the first in Denmark. In 1848, he held his first exhibition (primarily watercolors), then had an exhibit of oil paintings in 1849. It was well-received and his travel support was extended so he was able to visit most of Western Europe, including Italy. One of the paintings that resulted from this trip, a view of the Church of Our Blessed Lady of the Sablon, was purchased for the Royal Collection.

Upon returning, he was a teaching assistant for perspective and ornamentation at the Academy for many years, until the death of Gustav Friedrich Hetsch in 1864, when he was promoted to succeed him as a professor of perspective; a position he held for the rest of his life, serving several terms as the Academy's Vice-President. He also was a member of the selection committee for the Charlottenborg Spring Exhibition.

He was appointed Knight of the Order of the Dannebrog in 1859 and a State Councillor (a largely honorary title with a few privileges) in 1871. Over the years, he worked on restoration projects at Rosenborg, Kronborg and Frederiksborg castles, the last of which suffered a major fire in 1859. He also designed furniture, silverware and porcelain, coordinating design at Bing & Grøndahl's porcelain factory for a period of 22 years. In 1877, together with his wife, Margrethe, he created the "State Councilor H. Hansen and Wife Silver Anniversary Scholarship".

He went through an extended period of illness and apparently recovered for a time, but had a sudden relapse and died the next day.

== Gallery ==
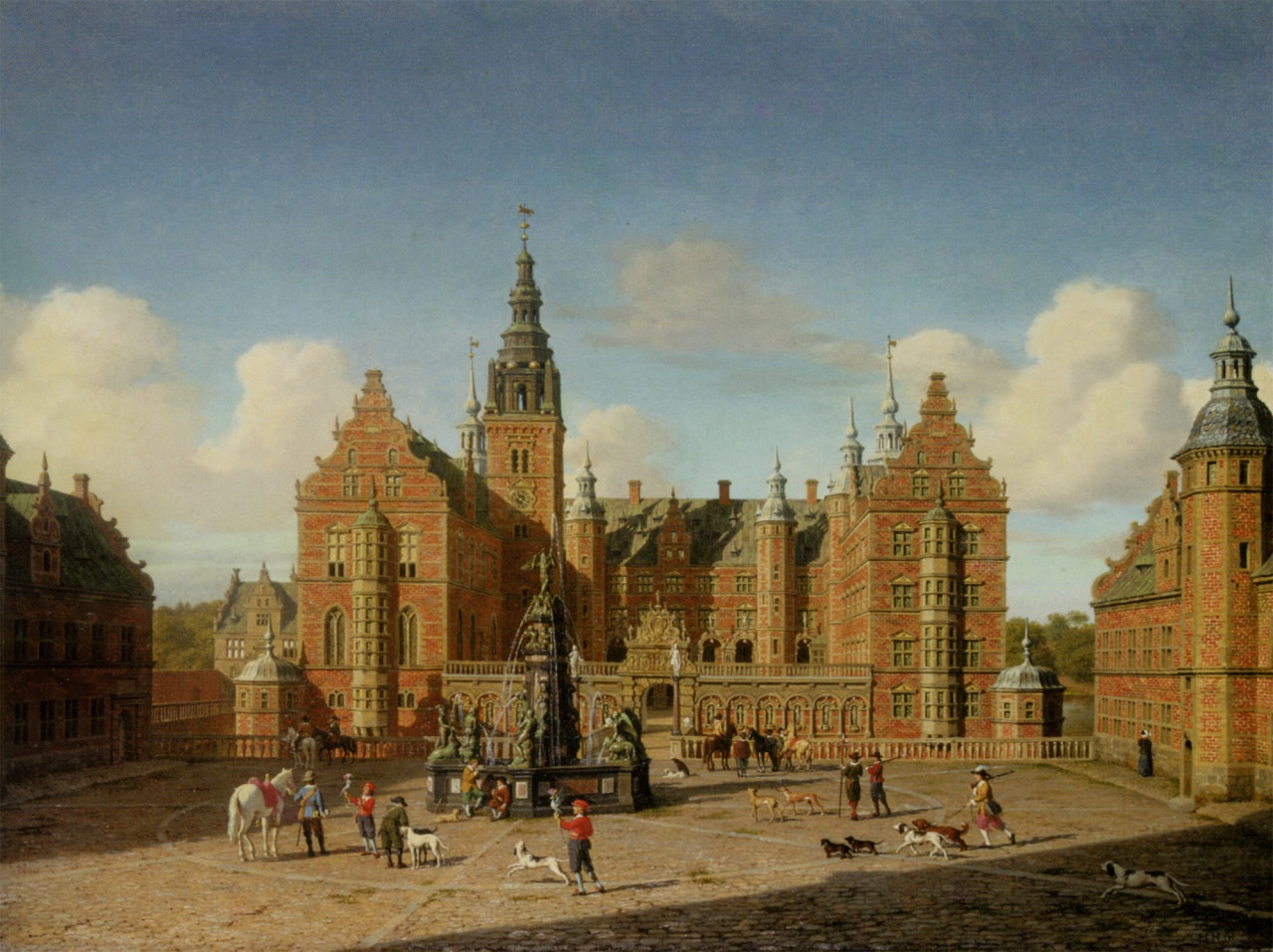
Fredriksborg Castle:
The Royal Falcon Hunt

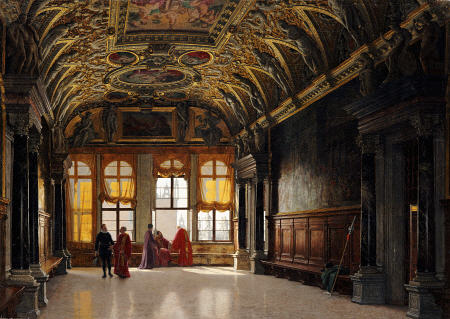
Sala Delle Quattro Porte,
Doge's Palace, Venice

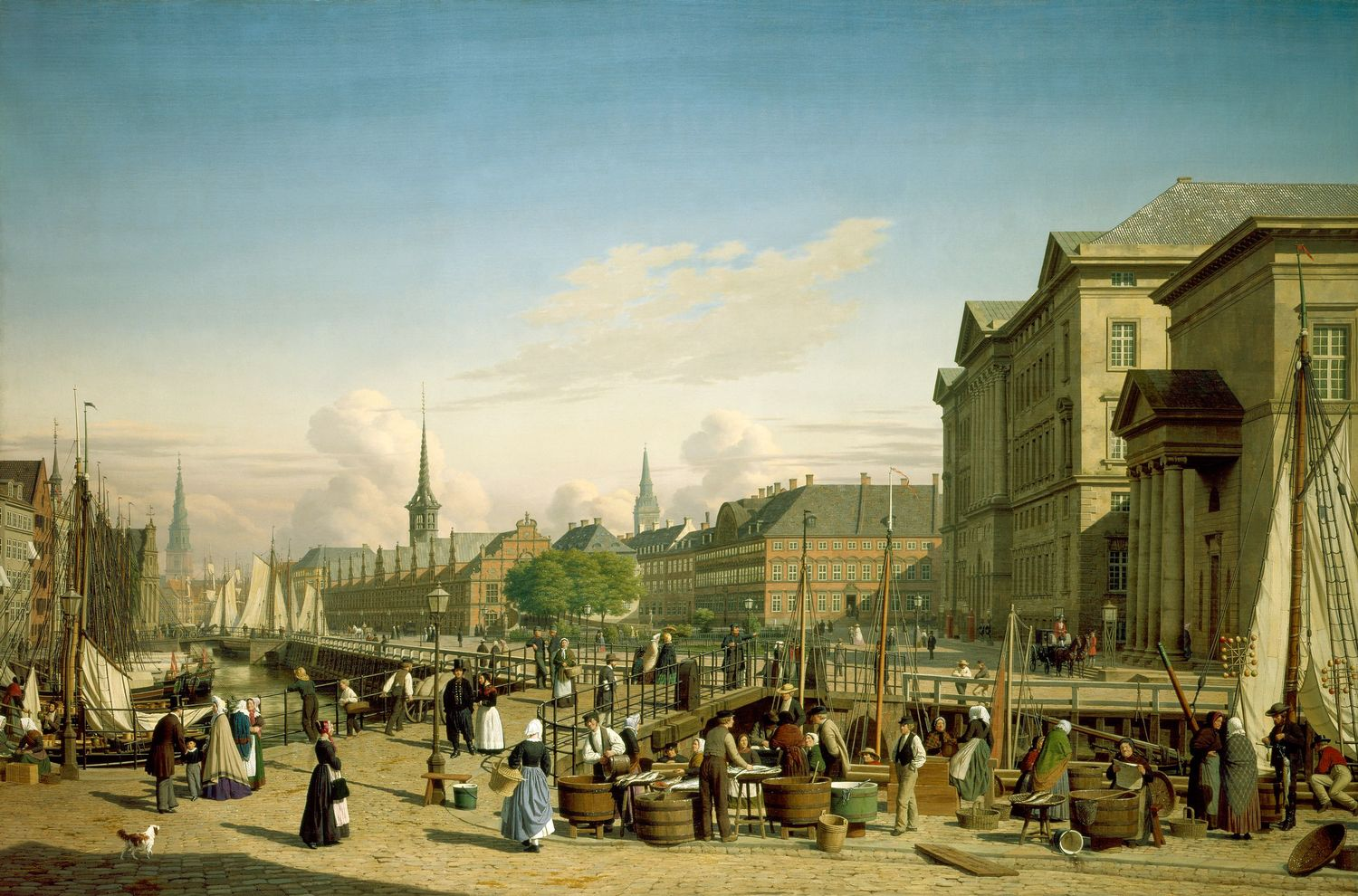
Christianborg from Højbro Plads
