= Evangelical Catholic =

Lutheranism that emphasizes its Catholic heritage

An Evangelical-Lutheran Mass being celebrated ad orientem, including the Elevation of the host, genuflection and incense; organised by the Evangelical Catholic organisation Societas Sanctae Birgittae.

The term Evangelical Catholic (from catholic meaning universal and evangelical meaning Gospel-centered) is used in Lutheranism, with those calling themselves Evangelical Catholic Lutherans or Lutherans of Evangelical Catholic churchmanship stressing the catholicity of historic Lutheranism in liturgy (such as the Mass), beliefs (such as the perpetual virginity of Mary), practices (such as genuflection), and doctrines (such as apostolic succession). (Note: Lutherans of Evangelical Catholic churchmanship have referred to themselves as Evangelical Catholic, and occasionally as Augsburg Catholic.) Evangelical Catholics teach that Lutheranism at its core "is deeply and fundamentally catholic". The majority of Evangelical Catholic Lutheran clergy and parishes are members of mainstream Lutheran denominations (such as the Church of Sweden), though certain Lutheran denominations, such as the Lutheran Church - International, have a solidly Evangelical Catholic churchmanship. Various apostolates and religious orders exist, which herald Evangelical Catholic principles within Lutheranism.

It is closely related to the movement of High church Lutheranism, which aims to emphasize and restore traditional liturgical practices to Lutheranism.

== Evangelical Catholic Lutheranism ==
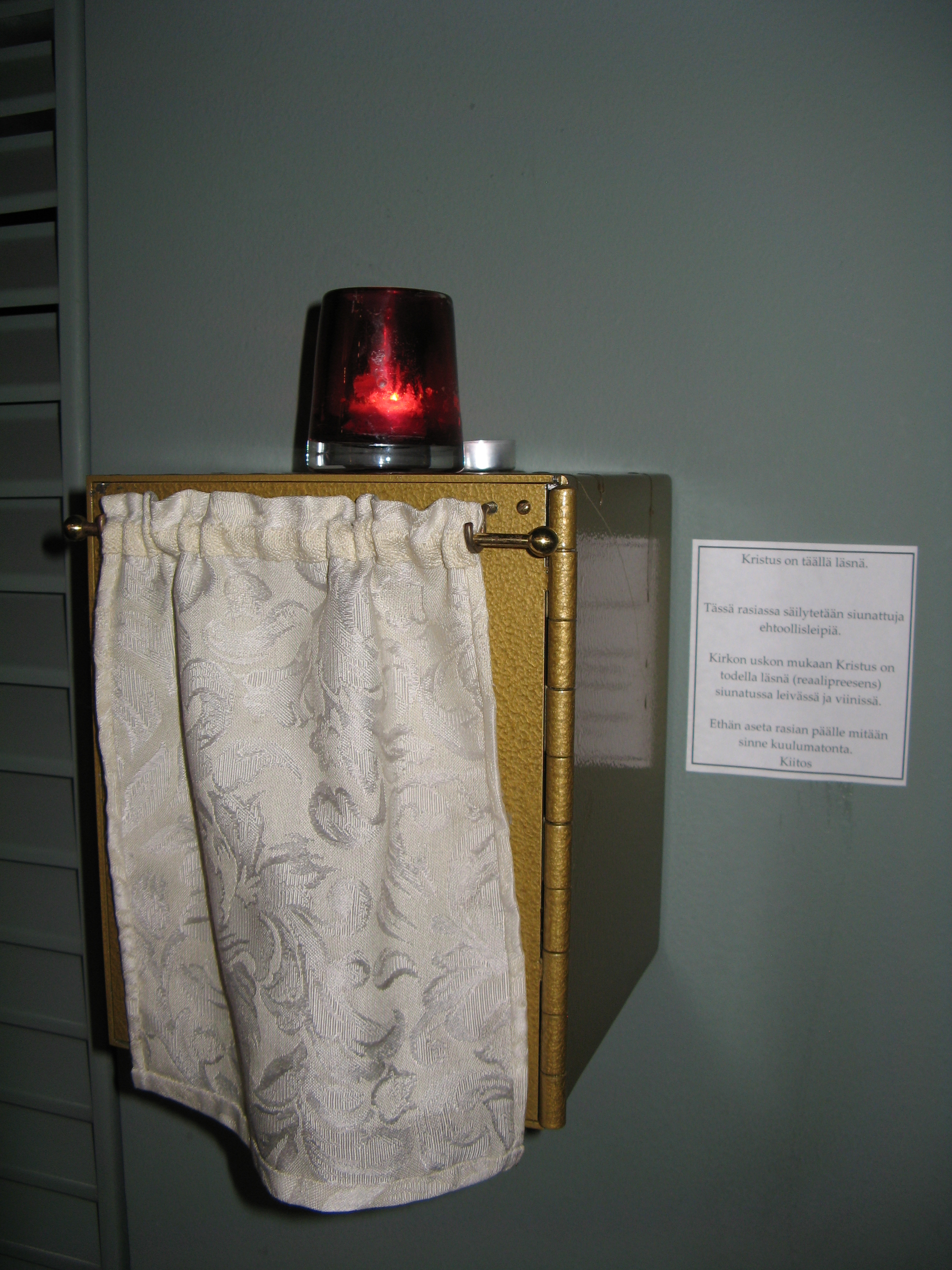
A tabernacle at Mikael Agricola Lutheran Church in Helsinki, juxtaposed with a chancel lamp and note about the real presence

=== Augsburg Confession as a Catholic document ===
The Augsburg Confession found within the Book of Concord, a compendium of belief of the Lutheran churches, teaches that "the faith as confessed by Luther and his followers is nothing new, but the true catholic faith, and that their churches represent the true catholic or universal church". When the Lutherans presented the Augsburg Confession to Charles V, Holy Roman Emperor in 1530, they believed it "showed that each article of faith and practice was true first of all to Holy Scripture, and then also to the teaching of the church fathers and the councils".

The Augsburg Confession further states that:

...one holy Church is to continue forever. The Church is the congregation of saints, in which the Gospel is rightly taught and the Sacraments are rightly administered.

In Lutheranism, the term Evangelical Catholic or Augsburg Catholic has a specific meaning. Lutheran Protestantism differs historically from most other kinds of Protestantism in that Lutheranism is the only historical Protestant denomination that confesses belief in three sacraments: regeneration in Holy Baptism, Confession as the sacrament of Absolution, and the Real Presence of Christ in Holy Eucharist. In Anglicanism and Methodism, two other Protestant traditions, there has also been a sacramentalism similar to that in orthodox Lutheranism, especially in the high church movement. The Book of Concord states, contrary to "Enthusiast" belief, that salvation can be received only through the means of grace: God's Word and sacraments. The Augsburg Confession stresses that "in doctrine and ceremonies nothing has been received on our part against Scripture or the Catholic Church." Article XXIV of the Augsburg Confession "Of the Mass" states: "Falsely are our churches accused of abolishing the Mass; for the Mass is retained among us, and celebrated with the highest reverence." Some Lutheran church bodies claim to also have retained the historical episcopate and apostolic succession. The evangelical feature of Lutheranism is justification by faith, as defined by Law and Gospel and simul iustus et peccator. The term evangelical has a different origin and meaning in Lutheranism than in "Evangelicalism". (In German, there is a difference between evangelisch and evangelikal; in Swedish, there is a corresponding difference between evangelisk and evangelikal). In the Lutheran tradition, evangelical (evangelisch) refers to the gospel, with the specific meaning of "grace centered". The opposite of evangelical is not "catholic" or "liberal", but legalistic.

=== Gnesio-Lutherans and the continuity of Apostolic Christianity ===
The Lutheran Church traditionally sees itself as the "main trunk of the historical Christian Tree" founded by Christ and the Apostles, holding that during the Reformation, the Church of Rome fell away.

In early Lutheranism, the Gnesio-Lutherans compiled the first modern critical history of the world, the Magdeburg Centuries, to show that the Lutheran Church was a continuation of the Christian church throughout its history, though stripped of abuses originating from the pope. Gnesio-Lutherans such as Joachim Westphal and Andreas Musculus had a "high" understanding of the sacraments, and therefore were strongly opposed to any compromise with Calvinism and Zwingliism, as well as with Roman Catholic doctrine. In the era of Lutheran orthodoxy, theologians Martin Chemnitz and Johann Gerhard (especially in his Confessio Catholica) made extensive use of patristic sources. They saw the continuity of the pre-Reformation church in Lutheranism, which they understood not as a re-formation of the church, but rather a renewal movement within and for the Christian church, from which the Roman church did truly represent.

With regard to the nature of the church, Lutheran theology therefore holds that:

There can only be one true visible Church. Of this our Catechism speaks in Question 192: "Whom do we call the true visible Church?" Answer: "The whole number of those who have, teach and confess the entire doctrine of the Word of God in all its purity, and among whom the Sacraments are duly administered according to Christ's institution." That there can be but one true visible Church, and that, therefore, one is not just as good as another stands to reason because there is only one truth, one Bible, one Word of God. Evidently that Church which teaches this truth, the whole truth, and nothing but the truth, is the true visible Church. Christ says John 8, 31. 32: "If ye continue in My Word, then are ye My disciples indeed; and ye shall know the truth, and the truth shall make you free." Again Christ says Matt. 28, 20: "Teaching them to observe all things whatsoever I have commanded you." Whatsoever He has commanded us, His Word, and nothing else, we should teach. And again, all things which He has commanded us we should teach. That, therefore is the true visible Church which does this. But that all visible Churches do not this is plain from the fact that they do not agree among themselves. If every Church would teach the whole truth and nothing but the truth as God has revealed it, there could be no difference. So, then, by calling other denominations Churches, we do not mean to say that one Church is just as good as another. Only that one is the true visible Church which teaches and confesses the entire doctrine of the Word of God in all its purity, and in whose midst the Sacraments are duly administered according to Christ's institution. Of all Churches, this can only be said of our Lutheran Church.

=== Lutheran monasticism ===
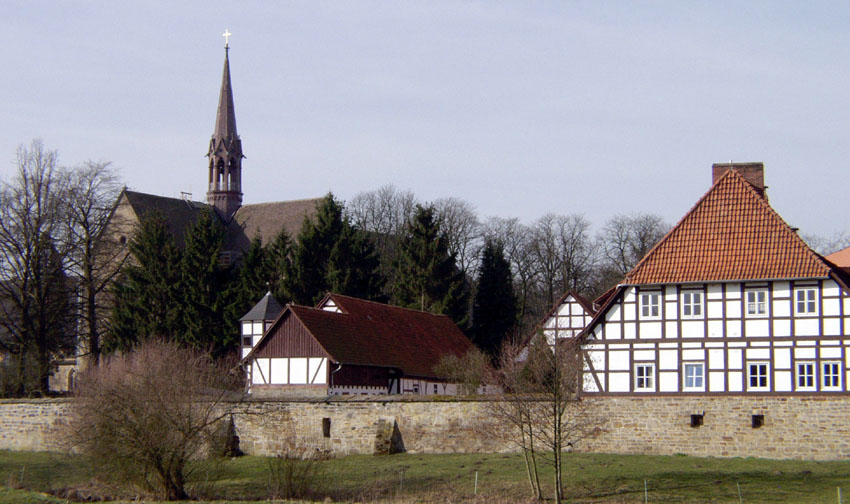
Loccum Abbey continued as a Lutheran monastery since the 16th century A.D.

Evangelical Catholics of Lutheran churchmanship cherish the practice of Christian monasticism; after the Reformation, many monasteries and convents adopted the Lutheran faith and continued religious life, including lay oblates. Examples include monasteries such as Amelungsborn Abbey near Negenborn and Loccum Abbey in Rehburg-Loccum, as well as convents such as Ebstorf Abbey near the town of Uelzen and Bursfelde Abbey in Bursfelde.

New religious orders were established by Lutherans throughout the centuries such as Östanbäck Monastery, a Benedictine community in Sala, Sweden and Saint Augustine's House, a monastery in Michigan. Mother Basilea Schlink established the charismatic Evangelical Sisterhood of Mary in Darmstadt, which contains the motherhouse where the Lutheran nuns reside. The Order of Lutheran Franciscans is a religious institute affiliated with the Evangelical Lutheran Church in America.

=== Sacred art in Lutheranism ===
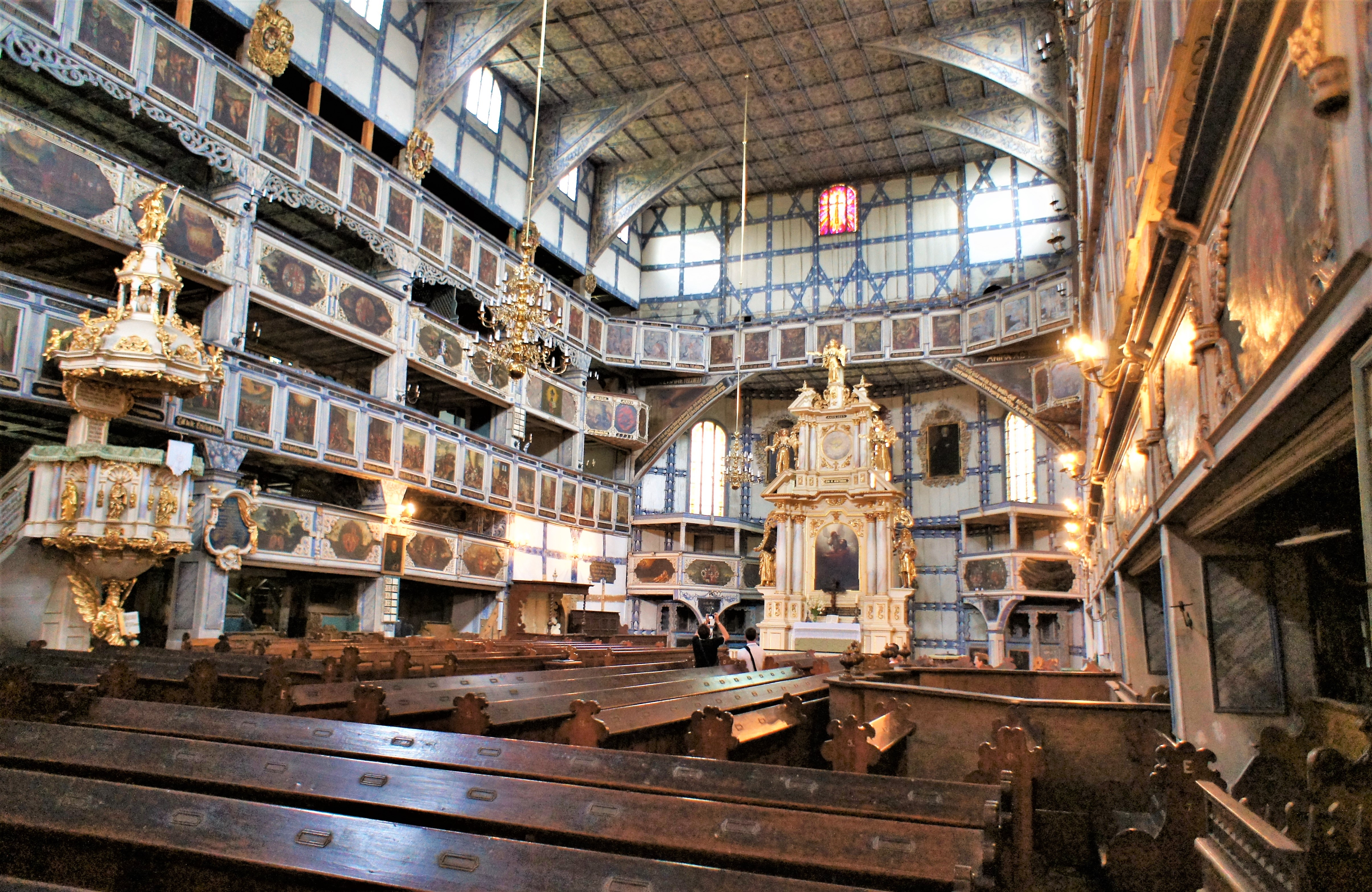
Elaborate interior of the Church of Peace in Jawor in Poland, part of the Evangelical Church of the Augsburg Confession in Poland

Lutherans had different views regarding religious imagery than Reformed Christians. Martin Luther in Germany allowed and encouraged the display of religious imagery in churches, seeing the Evangelical Lutheran Church as a continuation of the "ancient, apostolic church". Lutheran altarpieces like the Last Supper by the younger Cranach were produced in Germany, especially by Luther's friend Lucas Cranach, to replace Catholic ones, often containing portraits of leading reformers as the apostles or other protagonists, but retaining the traditional depiction of Jesus. As such, "Lutheran worship became a complex ritual choreography set in a richly furnished church interior." Lutherans proudly employed the use of the crucifix as it highlighted their high view of the theology of the Cross. Stories grew up of "indestructible" images of Luther that had survived fires by divine intervention. Thus, for Lutherans, "the Reformation renewed rather than removed the religious image." As such, "Lutheran places of worship contain images and sculptures not only of Christ but also of biblical and occasionally of other saints as well as prominent decorated pulpits due to the importance of preaching, stained glass, ornate furniture, magnificent examples of traditional and modern architecture, carved or otherwise embellished altar pieces, and liberal use of candles on the altar and elsewhere."

Lutherans strongly defended their existing sacred art from a new wave of Reformed-on-Lutheran iconoclasm in the second half of the century, as Reformed rulers or city authorities attempted to impose their will on Lutheran populations in the "Second Reformation" of about 1560-1619. Against the Reformed, Lutherans exclaimed: "You black Calvinist, you give permission to smash our pictures and hack our crosses; we are going to smash you and your Calvinist priests in return". The Beeldenstorm, a large and very disorderly wave of Calvinist mob destruction of images and church fittings that spread through the Low Countries in the summer of 1566 was the largest outbreak of this sort, with drastic political repercussions. This campaign of Reformed iconoclasm "provoked reactive riots by Lutheran mobs" in Germany and "antagonized the neighbouring Eastern Orthodox" in the Baltic region.

=== Lutheran devotions ===
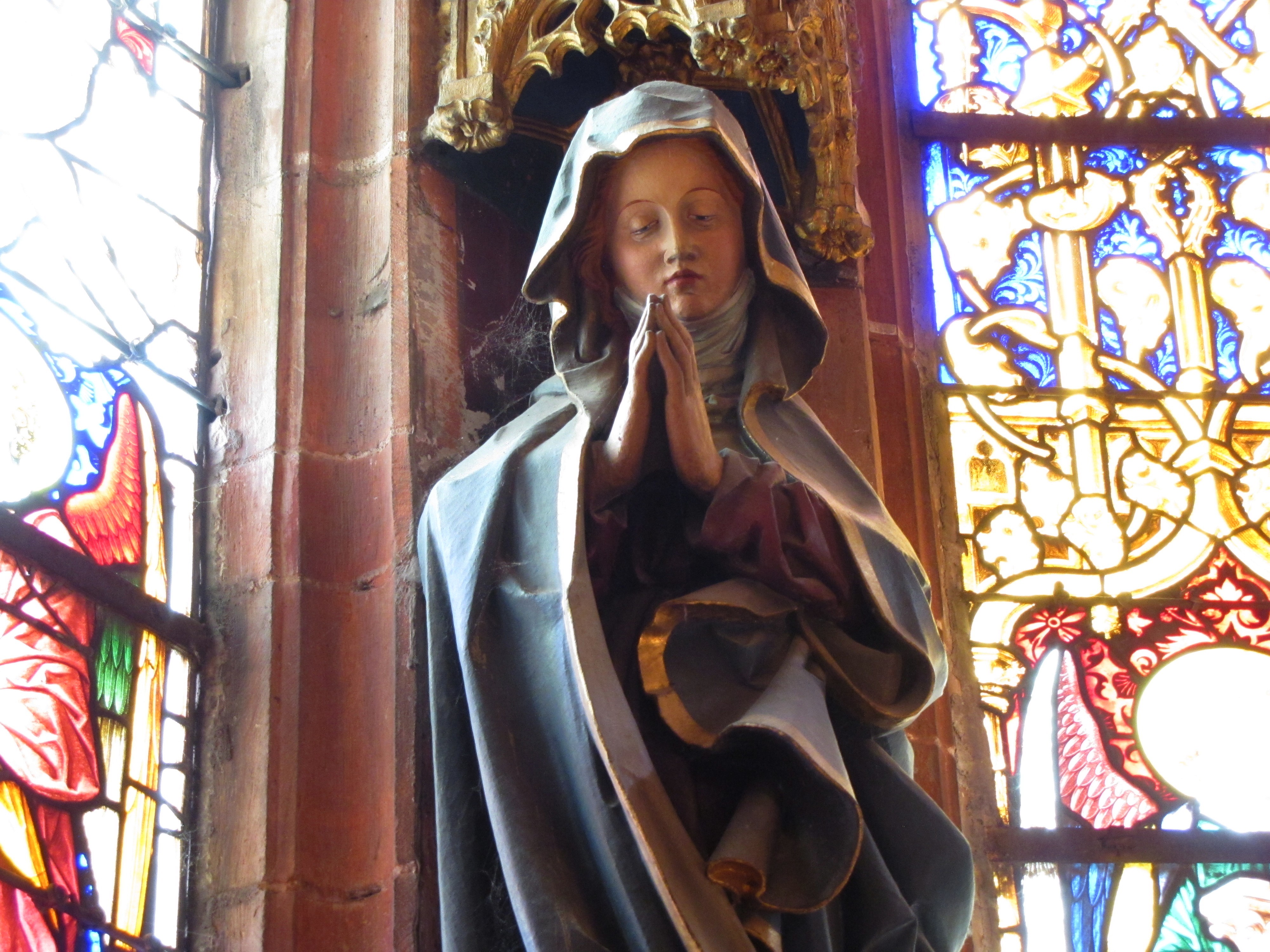
A statue of Mary in the Lutheran church of Saint-Pierre-le-Jeune, Strasbourg

Lutheran Mariology is informed by the Augsburg Confession and honours Mary as "the most blessed Mother of God, the most blessed Virgin Mary, the Mother of Christ," and "the Queen of Heaven." The Smalcald Articles, a confession of faith of the Lutheran churches, affirm the doctrine of the perpetual virginity of Mary. Lutherans of Evangelical Catholic churchmanship tend to stress a continuity with these pre-Reformational beliefs that have been upheld by many Lutherans theologians since Martin Luther himself. As a sign of reverence for and devotion to the Blessed Virgin Mary, Martin Luther advocated the use of the original version of the Hail Mary prayer before it was modified at the Roman Catholic Church's Council of Trent (that is, "Hail Mary, full of grace, the Lord is with thee. Blessed art thou among women and blessed is the fruit of thy womb, Jesus.") The 1522 Betbüchlein (Prayer Book) retained the Ave Maria.

The Wreath of Christ, also known as the Pearls of Life, is a set of prayer beads developed by the Swedish Evangelic-Lutheran bishop Martin Lönnebo. They are a devotion used by communicants in the Lutheran churches.

Many Lutheran women of Evangelical Catholic churchmanship wear a veil during prayer and worship. The General Rubrics of the Evangelical Lutheran Synodical Conference of North America, as contained in "The Lutheran Liturgy", state in a section titled Headgear for Women: "It is laudable custom, based upon a Scriptural injunction (1 Cor. 11:3-15), for women to wear an appropriate head covering in Church, especially at the time of divine service."

=== Episcopal polity and apostolic succession ===
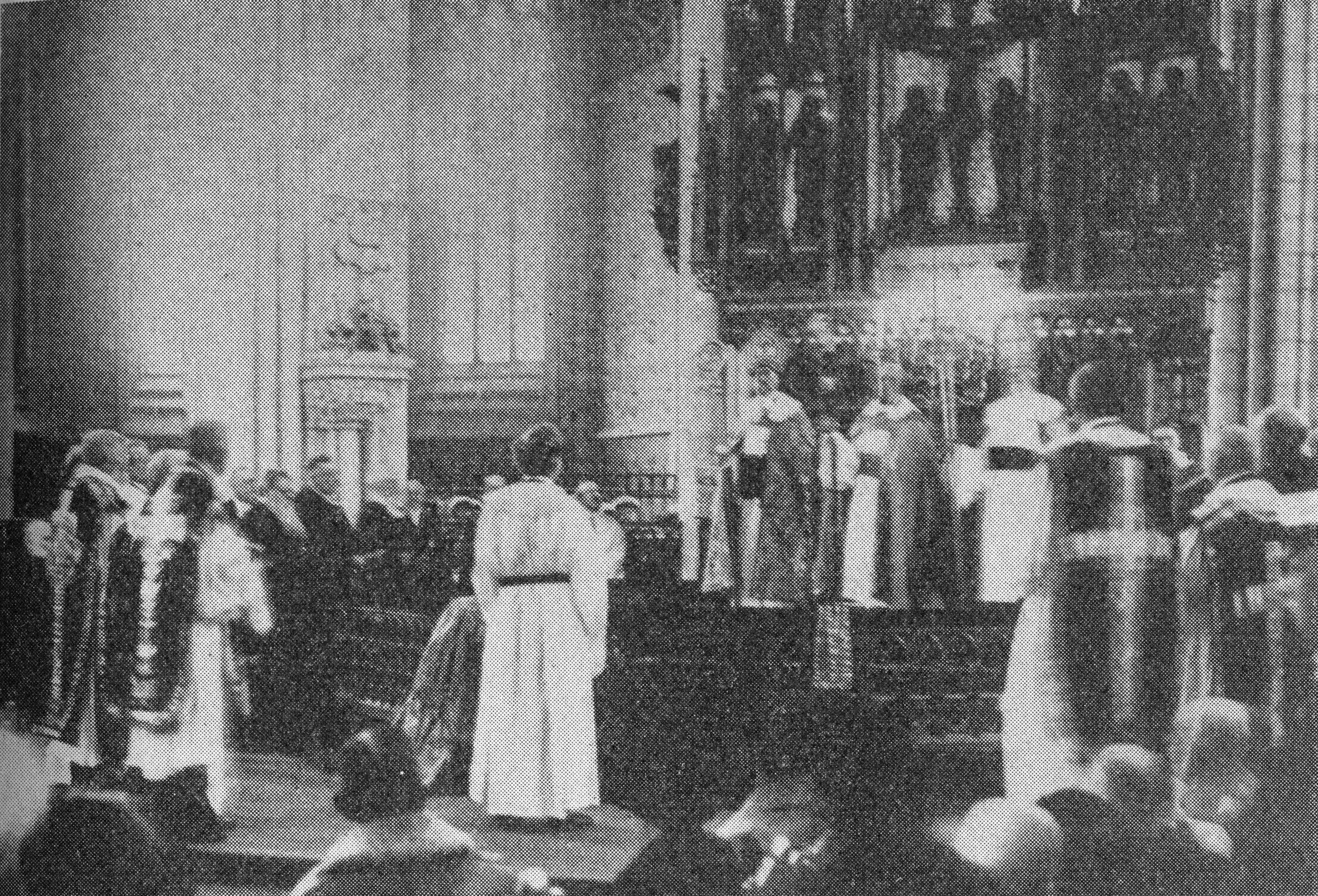
Nathan Söderblom is ordained as archbishop of the Church of Sweden, 1914.

Traditions, such as episcopal polity and apostolic succession are also maintained and seen as essential by Lutherans of Evangelical Catholic churchmanship; the Church of Sweden for example teaches that "Since this ordinance was very useful and without doubt proceeded from the Holy Ghost, it was generally approved and accepted over the whole of Christendom. . . . It belongs to the office of the Bishop that he in his diocese shall ordain and govern with Priests, and do whatsoever else is required." The Evangelical Lutheran Church of Finland and the Church of Sweden continue the apostolic succession of bishops who ordain priests through the laying on of hands.

What made the Church of Sweden an evangelical-catholic church was to Archbishop Söderblom the fact that the Reformation in Sweden was a 'church improvement' and a 'process of purification' which did not create a new church. As a national church, the Church of Sweden succeeded in bringing together medieval Swedish tradition with the rediscovery of the gospel which the Reformation brought with it. Archbishop Söderblom included the historic episcopate in the tradition-transmitting elements. The Church of Sweden was, according to Söderblom, in an even higher degree than the Anglican Church a via media. —Together in Mission and Ministry: The Porvoo Common Statement

Such a view sees the congregational form of church governance as non-Lutheran and not reflective of Lutheranism's identity as a catholic Church; the Evangelical Catholic Church, a Lutheran denomination based in North America, taught:

A so-called democratic form of Church polity, or congregational rule/autonomy, where the children rule the father, is unscriptural, non-Catholic, non-Lutheran, and a subversion of God's natural, revealed Order. The form of Church government practiced by the LC-MS and ELCA (and almost all other expressions of American Lutheranism) was condemned by Fr. Luther when Philip of Hesse (perhaps the most prominent Prince within the Reformation Movement next to the Elector of Saxony), prevailed upon the synod at Hamburg in 1526 to adopt a form of congregational government ordered by a constitution accepted by all. In January 1527 Dr. Luther convinced Philip to repudiate this plan for congregational government. Such polity (i.e., congregationalism) undermines The Gospel and usually leads to the distorted view that, because The Faithful are a royal priesthood (I Pet. 2:9), all Christians (the priesthood of all believers) possess the public office of the ministry. Such a teaching (i.e., the mandate or justification of a congregational form of Church polity) is not found in Holy Scriptures; such a practice does not conform to the teachings of Dr. Luther. That is why, without a doubt, the Lutheran Confessions nowhere mention such a "doctrine". The congregational (or priesthood of all believers) form of Church polity has no foundation in the Scriptures, the canons of the undivided Church, the Lutheran Confessions, or the writings of Dr. Martin Luther. For this reason the canons of The Evangelical Catholic Church state that the parish Pastor is the spiritual father of his parish (XIII,1).

These views have proved to be influential in all of Lutheranism, especially when ecumenical agreements between churches are made; in the largest Lutheran denomination in United States, for example, "all episcopal installations in the Evangelical Lutheran Church in America take place with the participation of bishops in the apostolic succession."

=== Evangelical Catholicism in the Lutheran churches ===
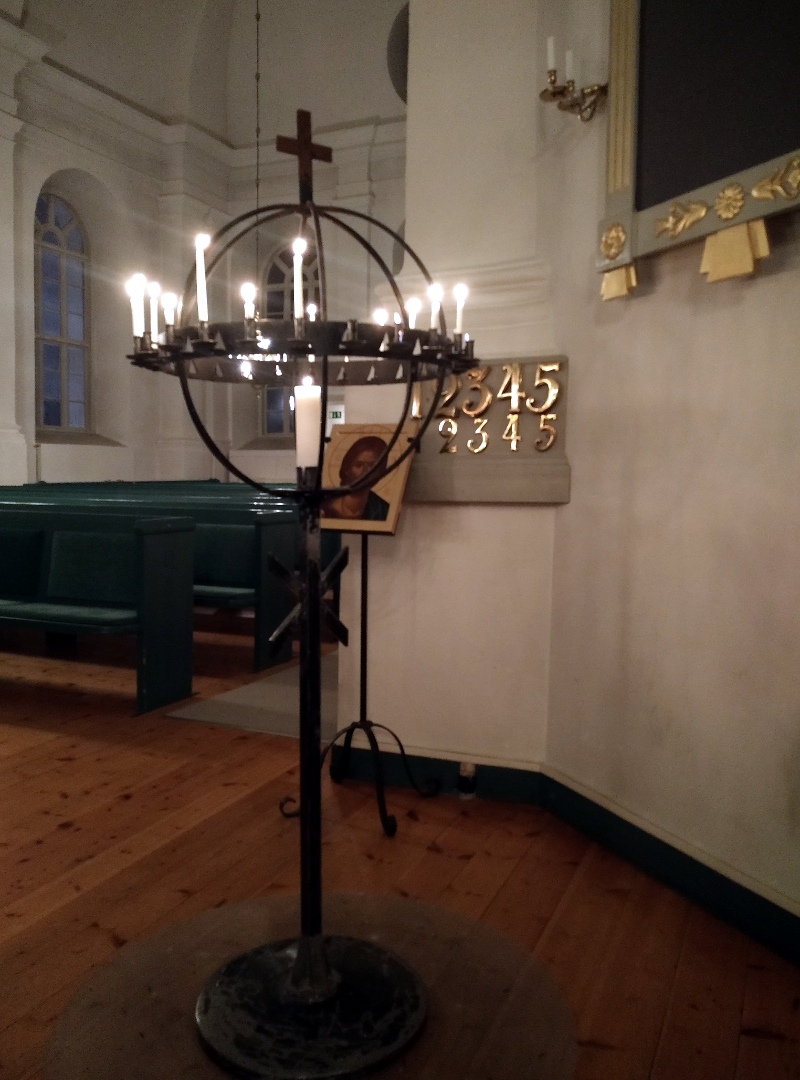
A votive candle rack stands before an icon of Christ Pantocrator in a Lutheran parish church of the Church of Sweden in Skellefteå.

In the 19th century, "Evangelical Catholicism" was seen as a vision for the Church of the future. The term was used by Lutherans such as Ernst Ludwig von Gerlach and Heinrich Leo within the post-Prussian Union church in Germany who were inspired by the church of the Middle Ages, and by neo-Lutheran Friedrich Julius Stahl.

The term Evangelical Catholic is often used today instead of the term "High Church Lutheranism" because it is a theological term. It is comparable to the term "Anglo-Catholic" within Anglicanism. Evangelical Catholic Lutheranism is inclusive of the theologically, biblically, and socially conservative ultra-high church Lutheranism of those within the Confessional Lutheran movement who follow the late Arthur Carl Piepkorn, the Evangelical Catholic Orthodoxy of Gunnar Rosendal, the more theologically moderate high ecclesiology of Carl Braaten, the very liberal Evangelical Catholicity of Nathan Söderblom, or even the more liberal Catholicism of Friedrich Heiler, and the ecumenical vision of Hans Asmussen and Max Lackmann, as well as the strongly Roman Catholic-oriented Anglo-Lutheran Catholic Church and the more Eastern Orthodox-oriented Evangelical Catholic Church.

In the Nordic countries, where High Church Lutheranism and Pietist Lutheranism has been highly influential, the Evangelical Lutheran Mission Diocese of Finland, Mission Province of the Church of Sweden, and the Evangelical Lutheran Diocese of Norway entered into schism with their national churches due to "the secularization of the national/state churches in their respective countries involving matters of both Christian doctrine and ethics”; these dioceses are in altar and pulpit fellowship with one another through the Communion of Nordic Lutheran Dioceses and are members of the confessional International Lutheran Council with their bishops having secured their lines of apostolic succession from other traditional Lutheran churches, such as the Evangelical Lutheran Church in Kenya.

The Evangelical Lutheran Church in Canada defines its doctrinal basis as such: "We derive our teachings from the Holy Scriptures and confess the three ecumenical creeds of the Christian church. We hold to orthodox catholic theology as enunciated in the ecumenical councils of the first five centuries of Christianity." Some small "Evangelical Catholic" church bodies include the Evangelical Catholic Church, Anglo-Lutheran Catholic Church, Lutheran Church - International, and the Lutheran Episcopal Communion. The Nordic Catholic Church in Norway has roots in High Church Lutheranism. However, most Evangelical Catholic Lutheran clergy and Evangelical Lutheran parishes are part of mainstream Lutheran denominations such as the Evangelical Lutheran Church in America, the Evangelical Church in Germany, and the Church of Sweden. Many Lutherans hold beliefs that would be characterized as being of the Evangelical Catholic churchmanship of Lutheranism, but prefer to be called simply as "Lutherans" as they view the catholic nature of Lutheranism to be inherent in Lutheranism and prefer to stress the unity within Lutheranism as a whole.

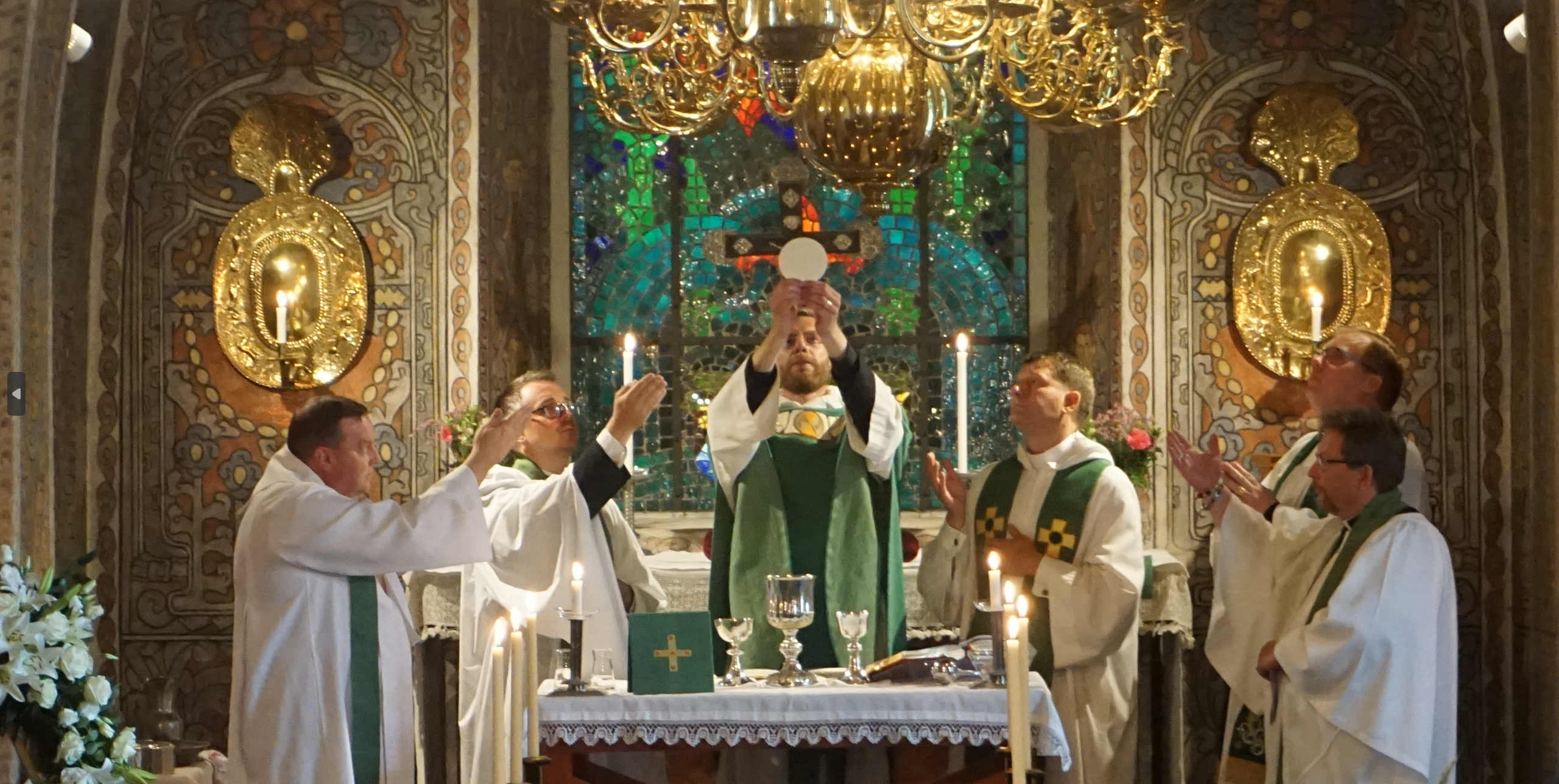
Consecration and elevation of the host at a mass with an Evangelical Catholic/high church profile in the Church of Sweden.

In 1976, Joseph Ratzinger, later Pope Benedict XVI, suggested that the Augsburg Confession might be possible to recognise as a Catholic statement of faith. This did not happen due to differences in understanding of the theology on justification. Various Roman Catholic leaders and theologians, such as Cardinal Kurt Koch have proposed the idea of Lutheran Ordinariates within the Catholic Church, which would allow Lutherans to join the Catholic Church and retain aspects of their liturgy and traditions. Lutherans of Evangelical Catholic churchmanship, however, have opposed conversion to Roman Catholicism, arguing that the "riches of the catholic tradition are already ours, and at our best we embrace that heritage".

== Other Christian traditions ==
Apart from its usage in Lutheranism, Evangelical catholic (catholic is the noun with evangelical modifying) can refer variously to:

- Evangelical Protestants who consider themselves to be catholic in the sense that they identify with the historic Christian Church. They believe that the early general councils and the Protestant Reformation were both part of the progressive illumination of the Holy Spirit;
- Roman Catholics who in continuity with the long tradition of the Church and empowered by Pope Benedict XVI's proclaimed New Evangelization stress the centrality and salvific universality of the gospel of Jesus Christ and the necessity of proclaiming it, in many ways identifying with the evangelical movement.

=== Catholic Church ===
As used by the Roman Catholic Church, the term evangelical Catholic refers to Roman Catholics in full communion with the Holy See in Rome and who hold the four characteristics of evangelicalism. The first is a strong theological and devotional emphasis on the Christian scriptures, often holding to a prima scriptura position regarding the Deposit of Faith. Secondly, evangelical Catholics stress justification by faith alone. A personal need for interior conversion is the third defining mark, and, consequently, the fourth is a deep commitment to evangelization.

Evangelical Catholics see these evangelical emphases as the core of the 2,000-year tradition of Catholic Christianity. Evangelical preaching movements such as St. Dominic's, who was called the Vir Evangelicus (evangelical man), are a common point of reference. To Catholics, the term 'evangelical' refers to its etymological root—the Greek word euangelion—which means 'good news' or 'Gospel', not to Protestant Evangelicalism. To Catholics, being evangelical is understood in the context of the adherence to the dogma and Sacred Tradition of the Catholic Church and in a Catholic interpretation of Scripture, and not in the doctrinal and ecclesiological upheavals of the Protestant Reformation.

Increasingly, the Roman Catholic Church is appropriating the evangelical witness of the recent popes and their encyclicals, especially Pope Paul VI's Evangelii nuntiandi (On Evangelization in the Modern World), John Paul II's Redemptoris missio (The Mission of the Redeemer), and the Congregation for the Doctrine of the Faith's Declaration Dominus Iesus (The Lord Jesus), for which Pope Benedict XVI was primarily responsible, when he was previously Prefect of the Congregation. New bibles, catechetical materials, youth ministry programs, and young adult ministries witness to greater evangelical zeal within the Church. College campus ministry and parish ministry are focusing more of their resources on outreach (pre-evangelization and evangelization). A Catholic organization called the Evangelical Catholic exists for the purpose of equipping Catholic ministries to be evangelical. In Greenville, South Carolina, a Catholic organization called the Center for Evangelical Catholicism exists for the purpose of spreading the "New Evangelization" program of the Pontifical Council for Promoting the New Evangelization in Roman Catholic parishes and schools across the United States.

Since the call to evangelization is so integral to the Catholic faith and solidly attested to in the ecumenical councils, the writings of the Church Fathers, and papal teaching, the late well-known Father Richard John Neuhaus (1936-2009), (a former longtime Evangelical Lutheran pastor) looked to the day when the term 'evangelical Catholic' would be redundant - when identifying as 'Catholic' would imply active evangelization so strongly that the addition of 'evangelical' would be unnecessary. As a group, they are often not disaggregated in social science research, though there have been recent calls to change this.

=== Old Catholicism, Methodism, and Reformed Christianity ===
In recent years, the term Evangelical Catholic, has been adopted by high church elements of the Methodist and Reformed churches. This is especially apt among the Reformed, given that one of the older documented uses of the term is by John Williamson Nevin and Philip Schaff, during their efforts (from roughly 1841 forward) to repristinate the theology of the German Reformed Church in the United States. In 1849 the Mercersburg Review was founded as the organ of their "Mercersburg Theology".

Beginning in 1851, William Augustus Mühlenberg, the Protestant Episcopal clergyman of Lutheran background, and father of the Ritualist movement in the Protestant Episcopal Church in the United States of America, also published a periodical called "The Evangelical Catholic." Muhlenberg's vision has influenced the Reformed Episcopal Church and some on the Free Church of England.

Already earlier, there was an evangelical revival in the Roman Catholic Church in Germany, involving Boos, Gossner and Feneberg. This evangelical revivalist movement also spread to German Lutheranism.

The Lusitanian Catholic Apostolic Evangelical Church in Portugal has its origins in the Old Catholic movement of the 19th century. Today it belongs to the Anglican Communion.

In England, Ulric Vernon Herford (1866–1938), irregularly consecrated as Mar Jacobus, Bishop of Mercia & Middlesex, founded The Evangelical Catholic Communion. His succession line was brought to the United States in the 1960s and continues in the Syro-Chaldean Church of North America.

Some members of various Christian denominations may use the term Evangelical Catholic to indicate the fact that they are evangelical and maintain their catholicity. For example, Methodists and Presbyterians believe their denominations owe their origins to the Apostles and the early church, but do not claim descent from ancient church structures such as the episcopate. However, both of these churches hold that they are a part of the catholic (universal) church. According to Harper's New Monthly Magazine:

The various Protestant sects can not constitute one church because they have no intercommunion...each Protestant Church, whether Methodist or Baptist or whatever, is in perfect communion with itself everywhere as the Roman Catholic; and in this respect, consequently, the Roman Catholic has no advantage or superiority, except in the point of numbers. As a further necessary consequence, it is plain that the Roman Church is no more Catholic in any sense than a Methodist or a Baptist.

— Henry Mills Alden

As such, according to one viewpoint, for those who "belong to the Church," the term Methodist Catholic, or Presbyterian Catholic, or Baptist Catholic, is as proper as the term Roman Catholic. It simply means that body of Christian believers over the world who agree in their religious views, and accept the same ecclesiastical forms.

=== New church bodies ===
At the end of the 20th century, the Convergence Movement formed new church bodies, including the Charismatic Episcopal Church, the Communion of Evangelical Episcopal Churches, and the King's Family of Churches. It governs by an Episcopal polity, embraces the Charismatic renewal, uses different liturgical versions in worship, both Anglican and Lutheran, and supports church missions and church planting.

== See also ==
- Porvoo Communion
- Lutheran orders and societies
- Lutheran women's convents
- Branch theory
- Spirituali
- Liturgical Movement
- Robert Jenson
- Society of the Holy Trinity
