= Denis Pétau =

French Jesuit theologian

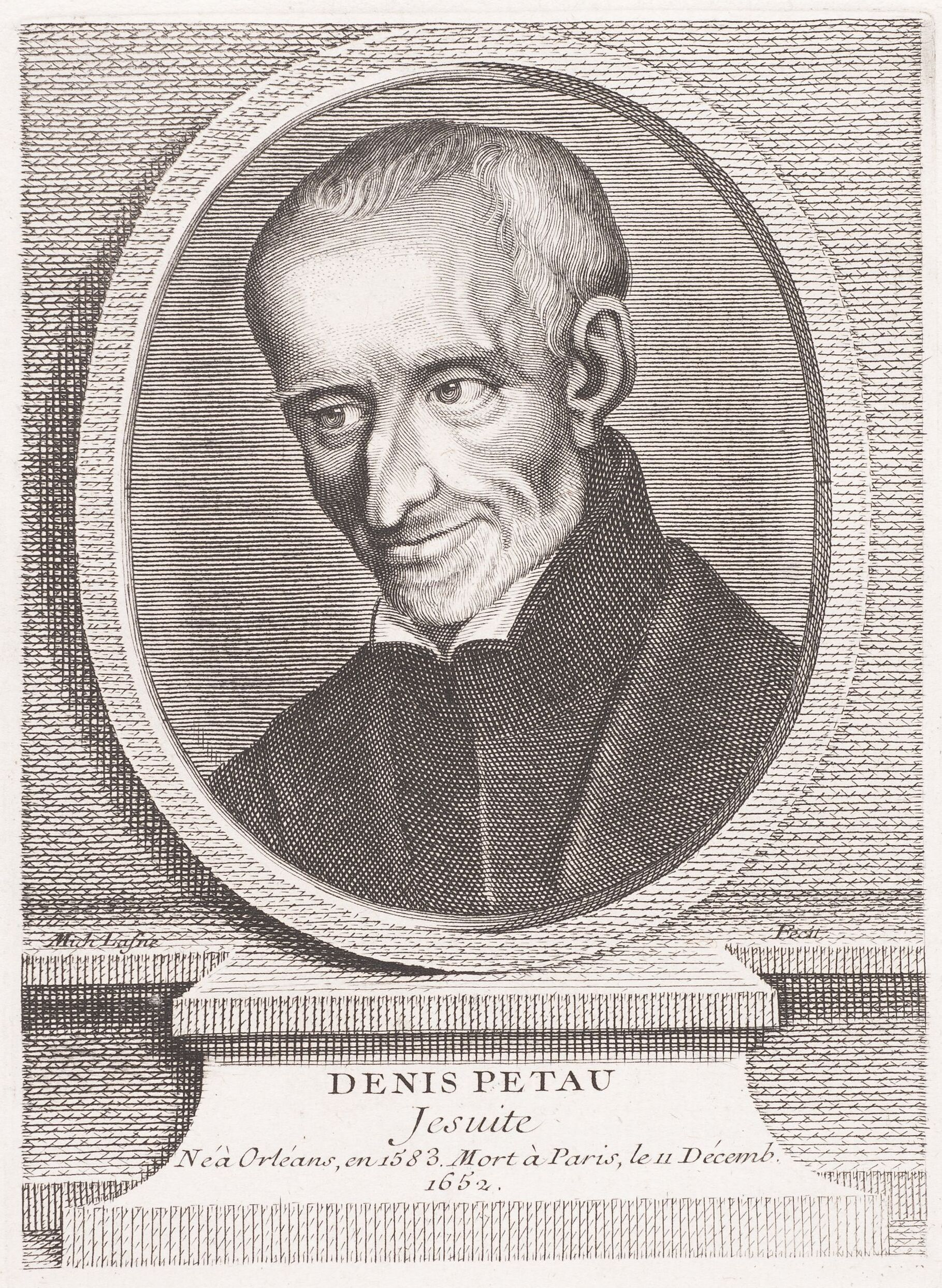
Dionysius Petavius

Denis Pétau (21 August 1583 – 11 December 1652), also known as Dionysius Petavius, was a French Jesuit theologian.

== Life ==
Pétau was born in Orléans, where he had his initial education; he then attended the University of Paris, where he successfully defended his theses for the degree of Master of Arts, not in Latin, but in Greek. After this he followed the theological lectures at the Sorbonne, and, on the advice of Nicolas Ysambert, successfully applied for the chair of philosophy at Bourges. At Paris he formed a friendship with Isaac Casaubon, then librarian at the royal library, where he spent all his spare time studying the ancient Greek manuscripts. At Orléans he was ordained deacon and presented with a canonry. In 1603 he was appointed to a lectureship at the University of Bourges, but resigned his place two years later, in order to enter the Society of Jesus.

After spending two years at Bourges he returned to Paris, and began a correspondence with Fronton du Duc, the editor of John Chrysostom. In 1605 he became a Jesuit, taught rhetoric at Reims (1609), La Flèche (1613), and at the Collège de Clermont (1618). During this last period he began a correspondence with the Bishop of Orléans, Gabriel de Laubépine (Albaspinaeus), on the first year of the primitive Church. Beginning in 1622, he taught positive theology for twenty-two years, and during this time he left France on only two occasions: first in 1629, to teach ecclesiastical history at Madrid at the invitation of Philip IV; second in 1639 to become a cardinal at Rome where Pope Urban VIII wanted him. At sixty years of age he stopped teaching, but retained his office of librarian, in which he had succeeded Fronton du Duc (1623), and devoted the rest of his life to his great work, the Dogmata theologica. He died in Paris.

== Works ==
Dogmata theologica, 1757

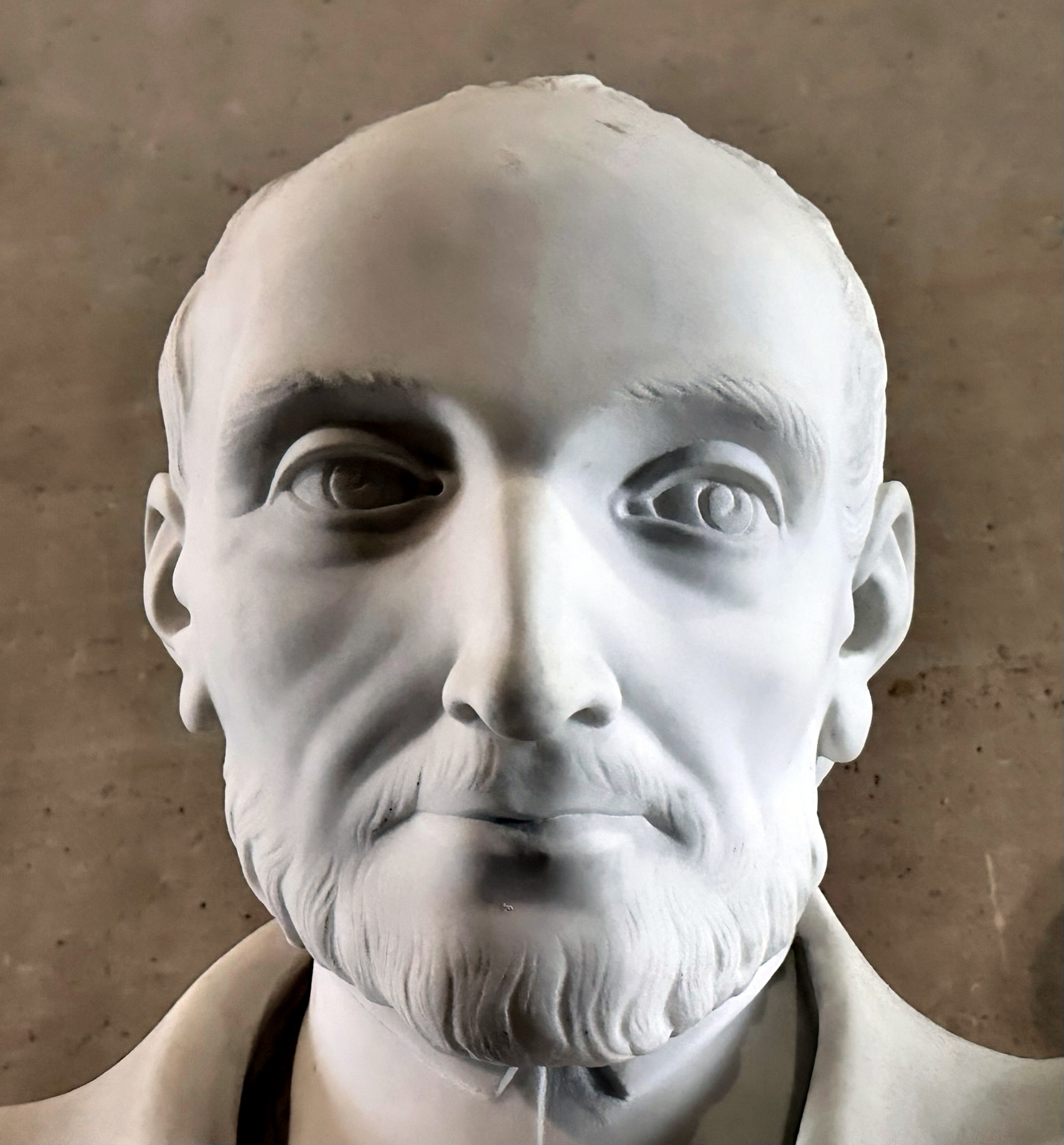
A bust of Pétau in the Palace of Versailles

Continuing the chronological labours of Joseph Justus Scaliger, Pétau published in 1627 an Opus de doctrina temporum, which has been often reprinted. An abridgment of this work, Rationarium temporum, was translated into French and English, and has been brought down to the year 1849.

Pétau's works cover chronology, history, philosophy, polemics, patristics, and the history of dogma. His first edition of the works of Synesius appeared in 1612, undertaken ten years earlier at the advice of Casaubon (Synesii episcopi Cyrenensis opera, new ed., 1633); in 1613 and 1614 the discourses of Themistius and Julian (new ed., 1630); in 1616 the Breviarium historicum Nicephori; then, after some poetical and oratorical works, an edition of Epiphanius in two volumes (1622; new ed., 1632), which had been undertaken at the advice of Jacques Gretser, S.J., and was originally intended only as a revised translation of Janus Cornarius. In 1622 and 1623 appeared the Mastigophores, three pamphlets, and the notes dealing with Saumaise's Tertullian, a bitter polemical work.

Among his previous writings, Pétau had inserted some masterly dissertations on chronology; in 1627 he brought out his De doctrina temporum, and later the Tabulae chronologicae (1628, 1629, 1633, 1657). It surpassed Scaliger's De Emendatione temporum (Paris, 1583), and prepared the ground for the works of the Benedictines. A summary of it appeared in 1633 (1635, 1641, etc.) under the title of Rationarium temporum, of which numerous reprints and translations into French, English, and Italian have been made.

About the same time he wrote poetical works in Greek and in Latin and dissertations (often of a polemical nature) against Grotius, Saumaise, Arnauld, and others. His paraphrase of the Psalms in Greek verse was dedicated in 1637 to Pope Urban VIII. Finally there appeared in 1643 the first three volumes of the Dogmata theologica (dated 1644); the fourth and fifth volumes were published in 1650; the work was incomplete at Pétau's death, and despite several attempts was never continued. Numerous editions of the "Dogmata theologica" have been published, including that by the Calvinist Jean Le Clerc, published in Antwerp in 1700; the last edition was brought out in eight volumes by J. B. Fournials (Paris, 1866–68). In 1757 F. A. Zaccaria, S.J., republished the work in Venice with notes and dissertations; in 1857 Passaglia and Schrader undertook a similar work, but they produced only the first volume. His letters, Epistolarum libri tres, were published after his death; though far from being complete, they give an idea of his close acquaintance with the most famous men in Europe of his time; they also furnish valuable information on the composition of his works and his method.

Petau's claim to fame chiefly rests on his vast, but unfinished, De theologicis dogmatibus, the first systematic attempt ever made to treat the development of Christian doctrine from the historical point of view.

The reputation Pétau enjoyed during his lifetime was especially due to his work on chronology. He boasted that he counted eight thousand mistakes in the Annales Ecclesiastici of Baronius. Eulogies were pronounced on him by his contemporaries, including Pierre Daniel Huet, Henri Valois, Hugh Grotius, Isaac Voss, F. Clericus, and Henry Noris. His chronological work has long since been surpassed.

In his patristic works he had at hand only imperfect editions of the Fathers of the Church. What he wanted had already been outlined by Melchior Cano, in his work De locis theologicis. Pétau's work has been questioned; it may have been inspired, it is said, by a similar treatise of Oregius (Agostino Oreggi, Cardinal), as Zöckler maintains, or by the Confessio catholica of John Gerhard (d. 1627), as conjectured by Eckstein. But the Confessio catholica has a different aim, stated on the first page; there are long historical developments in the sixteen books De Incarnatione Verbi of Pétau. The relationship with Oregius was examined in detail by François Oudin in the Mémoires de Trévoux (July 1718, pp. 109–33). He declares his opinions with full liberty, for example concerning the opinion of Augustine of Hippo on the problem of predestination, or the ideas on the Trinity of the ante-Nicene writers.

The work furnished a copious supply of documents. Pétau exaggerates the faults of Scholasticism; but he defends it against the accusations of Erasmus. In the Dogmata, after giving the history of each dogma, he adds the refutation of new errors.

In his polemical writings his style was bitter; he was more gentle in discussions with Grotius. The memory of Pétau was celebrated the day after his death by Henri Valois, one of his pupils, and by Leo Allatius in a Greek poem composed at the request of Pope Urban VIII.

== Legacy ==
A crater on the Moon is named Petavius in his honour.

== Bibliography ==
The complete list of Pétau's works fills twenty-five columns in Sommervogel. His major works are:

- Dionysius Petavius, Opus de Doctrina Temporum, 1627
- Dionysius Petavius, The History of the World or an Account of Time, 1659
- Denis Pétau, Antonii Kerkoetii Aremorici Animadversorum liber. Ad Claudii Salmasii notas in Tertullianum de Pallio, ristampa anastatica dell'edizione 1622 a c. di A. CAPONE, Clioedu, Lecce 2010.
