= Valesius =

Valesius is a Latinization of the Sabine name "Volusus". Prior to the foundation of the Roman Republic, the intervocal s underwent rhotacization, producing "Valerius", one of the more prominent gentes in Rome. People commonly known by the name Valesius include:

- Valesius (Sabine), the founder of the Secular Games
- Henricus Valesius, the Latinized classical form of Henri Valois, a French philologist; Valois is a corruption of Val d'Oise, "Oise River Valley"
