= Henry of Valois =

Henry of Valois may refer to:

- Henry II of France (1519–1559), King of France
- Henry III of France (1551–1589), King of France and Poland

== See also ==
- Henri Valois (1603–1676), classicist
