= Heidelberg Disputation =

1518 debate in which Martin Luther spoke

The Heidelberg Disputation was held at the lecture hall of the Augustinian order in Heidelberg, Germany on April 26, 1518. It was here that Martin Luther, as a delegate for his order, began to have occasion to articulate his views. In the defense of his theses, which culminated in a contrast between divine love and human love, Luther defended the doctrine of human depravity and the bondage of the will. Martin Bucer, the reformer of Strasbourg, heard Luther here and became an avid follower. This disputation also led to Johann Eck's challenging Martin Luther to the Leipzig Debate.

== 28 theses ==
The Heidelberg 28 theses were the basis of the disputation and represented a significant evolution from the 95 theses of the previous year from a simple dispute about the theology behind indulgences to a fuller, Augustinian theology of sovereign grace.

== Observers ==
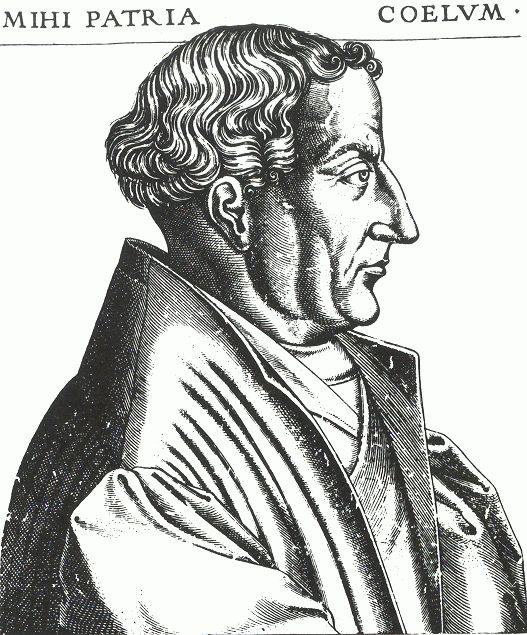
Martin Bucer

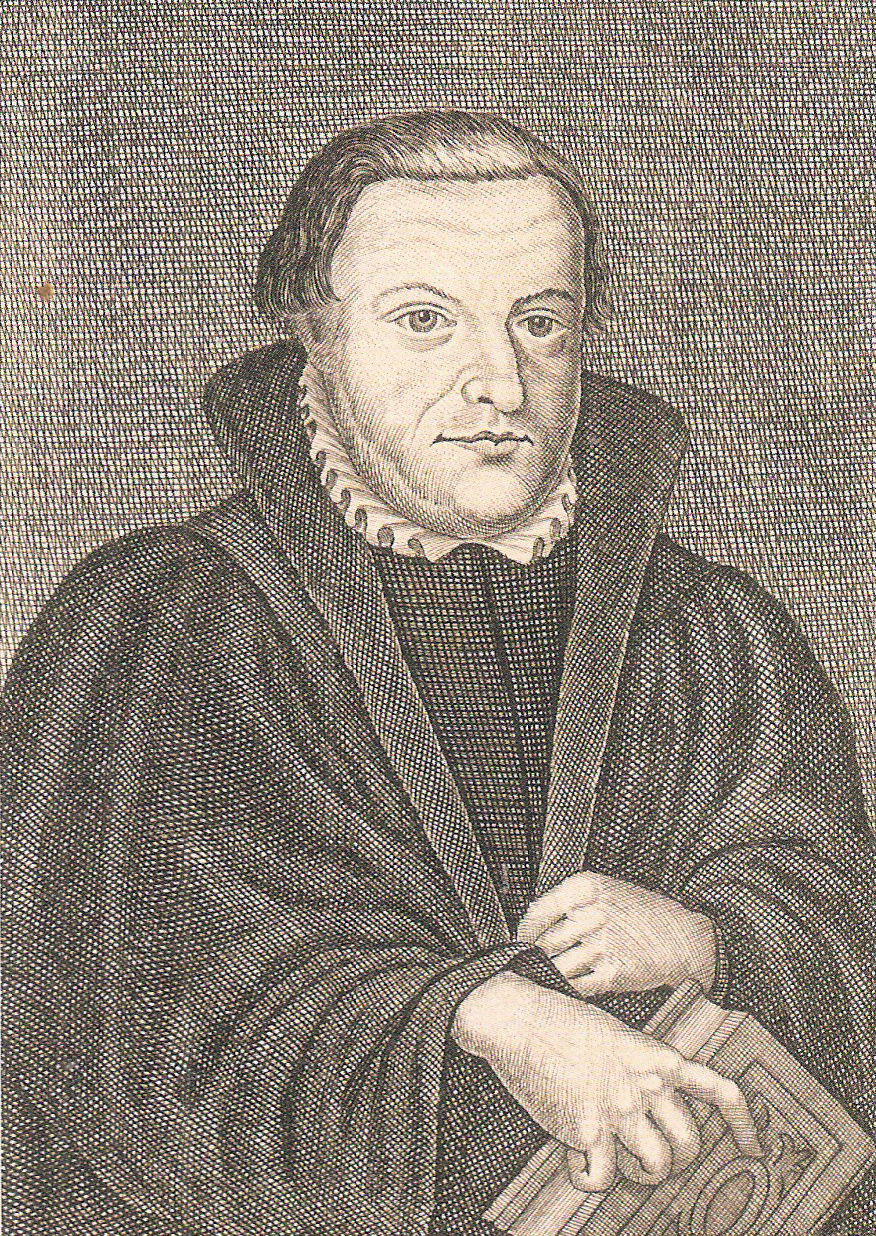
Erhard Schnepf

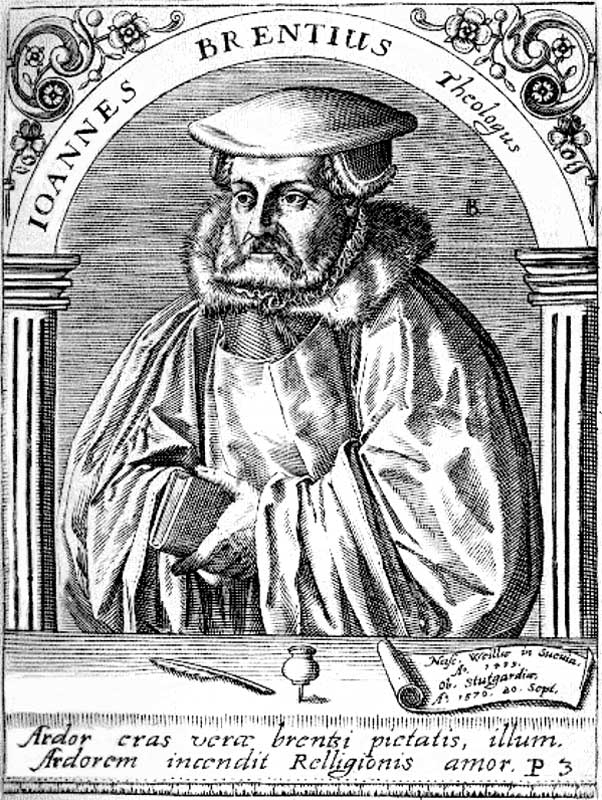
Johannes Brenz

== See also ==
- Theology of the Cross

== Resources ==
- Kittelson, James (1986), Luther the Reformer, Minneapolis: Augsburg Publishing House, ISBN 978-0-80662240-8.
- Kolb, Robert (2009), Martin Luther, New York: Oxford University Press, ISBN 978-0-19920894-4.
- Luther, Martin (Sep 2008) [26 Apr 1518], "The Heidelberg Disputation", The book of concord, archived from the original on 23 September 2017.
- Luther, Martin (March 2026) Luther's Works: The Freely Given Edition -- Heidelberg Disputation. English and Latin text of the 40 theses and 28 theological proofs.
- Totten, Mark (2003), "Luther on unio cum Christo: Toward a Model for Integrating Faith and Ethics", The Journal of Religious Ethics, 31 (3), Wiley-Blackwell: 443–62, doi:10.1111/1467-9795.00147, ISSN 0384-9694, JSTOR 40008337.
