= Theology of the Cross =

Term coined by Martin Luther

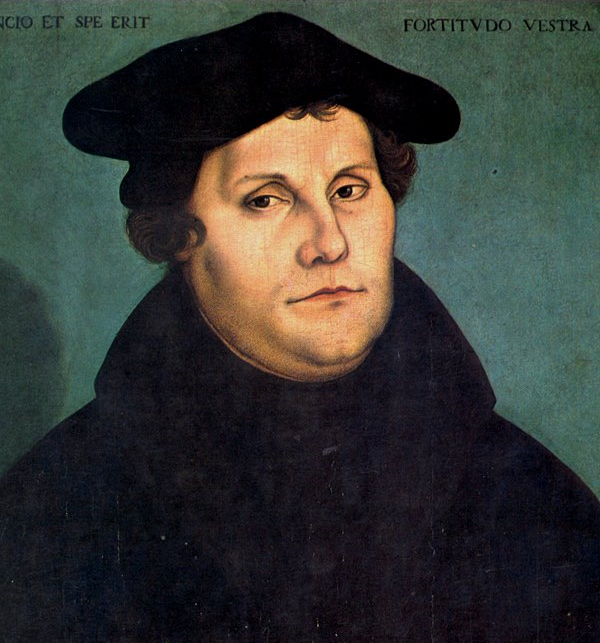
Luther in 1533 by Lucas Cranach the Elder

The theology of the Cross (Latin: theologia crucis, German: Kreuzestheologie) or staurology (from Greek stauros 'cross', and -logy: 'the study of') is a term coined by the German theologian Martin Luther to refer to theology that posits "the cross" (that is, divine self-revelation) as the only source of knowledge concerning who God is and how God saves. It is contrasted with the "theology of glory" (theologia gloriae), which places greater emphasis on human abilities and human reason.

== As defined by Luther ==
The term theologia crucis was used very rarely by Luther. He first used the term, and explicitly defined it in contrast to the theology of glory, in the Heidelberg Disputation of 1518. During this debate, he represented the Augustinians and presented his theses that later came to define the Reformation movement.

=== Theses ===
The pertinent theological theses of the debate are:

1. The law of God, the most salutary doctrine of life, cannot advance man on his way to righteousness, but rather hinders him.
2. Much less can human works, which are done over and over again with the aid of natural precepts, so to speak, lead to that end.
3. Although the works of man always appear attractive and good, they are nevertheless likely to be mortal sins.
4. Although the works of God always seem unattractive and appear evil, they are nevertheless really eternal merits.
5. The works of men are thus not mortal sins (we speak of works that apparently are good), as though they were crimes.
6. The works of God (those he does through man) are thus not merits, as though they were sinless.
7. The works of the righteous would be mortal sins if they would not be feared as mortal sins by the righteous themselves out of pious fear of God.
8. By so much more are the works of man mortal sins when they are done without fear and in unadulterated, evil self-security.
9. To say that works without Christ are dead, but not mortal, appears to constitute a perilous surrender of the fear of God.
10. Indeed, it is very difficult to see how a work can be dead and at the same time not a harmful and mortal sin.
11. Arrogance cannot be avoided or true hope be present unless the judgment of condemnation is feared in every work.
12. In the sight of God sins are then truly venial when they are feared by men to be mortal.
13. Free will, after the fall, exists in name only, and as long as it does what it is able to do, it commits a mortal sin.
14. Free will, after the fall, has power to do good only in a passive capacity, but it can do evil in an active capacity.
15. Nor could the free will endure in a state of innocence, much less do good, in an active capacity, but only in a passive capacity.
16. The person who believes that he can obtain grace by doing what is in him adds sin to sin so that he becomes doubly guilty.
17. Nor does speaking in this manner give cause for despair, but for arousing the desire to humble oneself and seek the grace of Christ.
18. It is certain that man must utterly despair of his own ability before he is prepared to receive the grace of Christ.
19. That person does not deserve to be called a theologian who looks upon the invisible things of God as though they were clearly perceptible in those things that have happened.
20. He deserves to be called a theologian, however, who comprehends the visible and manifest things of God seen through suffering and the cross.
21. A theologian of glory calls evil good and good evil. A theologian of the cross calls the things what it is.
22. That wisdom that sees the invisible things of God in works as perceived by man is completely puffed up, blinded, and hardened.
23. The law brings the wrath of God, kills, reviles, accuses, judges, and condemns everything that is not in Christ.
24. Yet that wisdom is not of itself evil, nor is the law to be evaded; but without the theology of the cross man misuses the best in the worst manner.
25. He is not righteous who does much, but he who, without work, believes much in Christ.
26. The law says "Do this", and it is never done. Grace says, "believe in this" and everything is already done.
27. One should call the work of Christ an acting work and our work an accomplished work, and thus an accomplished work pleasing to God by the grace of the acting work.
28. The love of God does not find, but creates, what is pleasing to it. The love of man comes into being through what is pleasing to it.

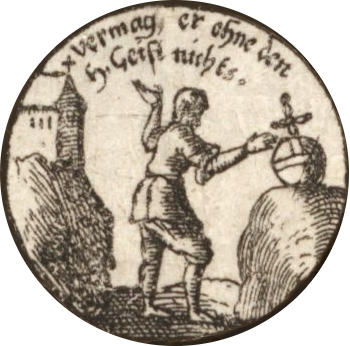
...man's will has some liberty to choose civil righteousness, and to work things subject to reason. But it has no power, without the Holy Ghost, to work the righteousness of God, that is, spiritual righteousness... –Augsburg Confession, Art. 18: Of Free Will

=== Tenets ===
By reading the theses, one can see that Luther insists on the complete inability of humanity to fulfill God's law. As one would find consistent with his Evangelical breakthrough, he emphasizes the grace of God in the role of salvation. Works of the law cannot improve one's standing.

According to Luther, the theologian of the cross preaches what seems foolish to the world (1 Corinthians 1:18). In particular, the theologian of the cross preaches that (1) humans can in no way earn righteousness, (2) humans cannot add to or increase the righteousness of the cross, and (3) any righteousness given to humanity comes from outside of us (extra nos).

In contrast, in Luther's view, the theologian of glory preaches that (1) humans have the ability to do the good that lies within them (quod in se est), (2) there remains, after the fall, some ability to choose the good, and (3) humans cannot be saved without participating in or cooperating with the righteousness given by God.

As Luther understood it, these two theologies had two radically different starting points: they had different epistemologies, or ways of understanding how people know about God and the world. For the theologian of glory, reason and personal perceptions should be employed to increase knowledge about God and the world. Thus, because an action appears to be good, it must be good. For the theologian of the cross, it is only from the self-revelation of God that people can learn about God and their relation to God—and the most perfect self-revelation of God is God's Word become flesh, Jesus the Christ. Thus, even if an action appears good, still Christ died on the cross for human sins and sinfulness, so the action is not as good as it appears.

In Martin Luther's sermon on the Two Kinds of Righteousness, he refers to theology of the cross as "alien righteousness" and theology of glory as "proper righteousness", owing to its origin in the person who presumes that he or she justifies himself or herself by works.

== Theology from the cross ==
Some authors translate Luther's phrase as "theology from the cross", emphasizing the significance of social position in shaping theology. This was part of a broader trend in Liberation theology and standpoint theory which also led to people's history.

== Catholic understanding ==
Paragraph 2015 of the Catechism of the Catholic Church describes the way of perfection as passing by way of the Cross. There is no holiness without renunciation and spiritual battle. Spiritual progress entails the ascesis and mortification that gradually leads to living in the peace and joy of the beatitudes.

== See also ==
- Antinomianism
- Free will in theology
- Incurvatus in se
- Justification
- Lutheranism
- Theology of Martin Luther

== Bibliography ==
- Arnold, C. (2001). Power and Magic: The Concept of Power in Ephesians. Wipf & Stock Publishers. ISBN 978-1-57910-835-9.
- Deutschlander, Daniel M. "The Theology of the Cross: Reflections on His Cross and Ours". Northwestern Publishing House, 2009.
- Bradbury, R.; Rae, M. (2011). Cross Theology: The Classical Theologia Crucis and Karl Barth's Modern Theology of the Cross. Wipf & Stock Publishers. ISBN 978-1-63087-617-3.
- Fiddes, Paul (1992). The creative suffering of God. Oxford: Clarendon Press. ISBN 978-0-19-826347-0. OCLC 27385408.
- Forde, Gerhard. On Being a Theologian of the Cross. Eerdmans, 1997. ISBN 0-8028-4345-X .
- Furuya, Yasuo (1982). "A Critical View on the So-called Asian Theology". Theological Studies in Japan. 1982 (21). The Japan Society of Christian Studies: 26–38. doi:10.5873/nihonnoshingaku.1982.26. ISSN 2185-6044.
- Hall, Douglas John. Lighten Our Darkness. Academic Renewal Press, 2001. ISBN 0-7880-9900-0.
- von Loewenich, Walter. Luther's Theology of the Cross. Augsburg, 1976. ISBN 0-8066-1490-0.
- McGrath, Alister. Luther's Theology of the Cross. Blackwell Publishing, 1990. ISBN 0-631-17549-0.
