= Evangelical Catholic Church (Lutheran) =

- Classification: Lutheran
- Orientation: Evangelical Catholic
- Polity: Episcopal
- Founder: Karl Barwin
- Origin: 1976; Arizona
- Merged into: North American Lutheran Church (2016)
- Defunct: 2016

The Evangelical Catholic Church (ECC) was founded in 1976 by former pastors and members of the Lutheran Church – Missouri Synod (LCMS) who were influenced by or interested in Eastern Orthodoxy. Originally a small High Church, Evangelical Catholic denomination, it later became an Independent Catholic Church, but it remained theologically Lutheran. The ECC became inactive in 2009, was revived in 2014 and disbanded in 2016, with its remaining parishes joining the North American Lutheran Church.

== History ==
On May 27, 1965, several members of the Congregation of the Servants of Christ, a Lutheran religious order based in Oxford, Michigan, together with some students at Concordia Senior College in Fort Wayne, Indiana, founded a religious society called the Order of the Servants of the Holy Cross. Due to their displeasure with the LCMS's conservative turn in the Seminex controversy of the late 1960s and early 1970s, the Order of the Servants of the Holy Cross withdrew from the LCMS and, in 1976, helped to organize the ECC. The order was officially accepted as monastic community under the jurisdiction of the ECC on November 30, 1977. The order disbanded in the 1980s.

The first bishop of the ECC was Karl Julius Barwin, who was elected at the church body's organizational meeting in Peoria, Arizona, in 1976. In 1982, Barwin was reordained a priest and in 1984, was consecrated as a bishop by three independent bishops who claimed valid Apostolic succession. Five years later, he was reconsecrated by eight other bishops who also claimed valid Apostolic succession. After Barwin's death on March 30, 2009, the ECC became inactive, but it was revived in 2014, when it received a new bishop. At that time, the ECC reported parishes in five states. The ECC disbanded in 2016, and its last parish joined the North American Lutheran Church.

== Beliefs ==
The ECC accepted the Apostles', Nicene (minus the filioque), and Athanasian creeds, as well as all the writings contained within the Book of Concord of 1580. Unlike most American Lutheran churches, the ECC taught the necessity of Apostolic succession and episcopal polity, and rejected the forms of congregational polity practiced by the LCMS and the Evangelical Lutheran Church in America. Unique among American Lutheran church bodies, the ECC supported the practice of infant communion. Other notable teachings included rejection of the ordination of women, identification of Muhammad as "Satan's Disciple", and forceful condemnation of illegal immigration. In 2003, it declared fellowship with the Orthodox Anglican Church.

== See also ==
- Lutheran Church - International
