= Georg Michael Wittman =

German Catholic prelate (1760–1833)

Coat of arms of Georg Michael Wittmann.

Georg Michael Wittmann (22 (23?) January 1760, near Pleistein, Oberpfalz, Bavaria – 8 March 1833, at Ratisbon) was a German prelate of the Catholic Church.

== Life ==
Wittman studied first with the Jesuits, then with the Benedictines at Amberg (1769–78), and at the University of Heidelberg (1778-9). On 21 December 1782, he was ordained priest. He served in the parishes of Kenmath, Kaltenbrunn, and Miesbrunn.

Wittman became professor and subregens at the diocesan seminary of Ratisbon in 1788, and regens in 1802. He served there for forty-five years, overseeing the preparation of over 1500 candidates for the priesthood. From 1804 he was also pastor of the cathedral.

In 1829 he was appointed auxiliary Bishop of Ratisbon and consecrated titular Bishop of Comana. In 1830, when the coadjutor Johann Michael Sailer became ordinary of Ratisbon, Wittmann was made his vicar-general; and after Sailer's death he was nominated Bishop of Ratisbon, 1 July 1832, but died before his preconization. He was buried in the cathedral of Ratisbon, where a monument was erected to his memory by Conrad Eberhard.

== Works ==
His chief literary works are:

- Principia catholica de sacra Scriptura (Ratisbon, 1793)
- Annotationes in Pentateuchum Moysis (Ibid., 1796)
- De horarum canonicarum utilitate morali (Augsburg, 1801)
- Anmahnung zum Colibate (s. l., 1804; Ratisbon, 1834)
- Confessarius pro aetate juvenili (Sulzbach, 1832).

Wittmann also prepared with Feneberg a translation of the New Testament (Nuremberg, 1808; latest edition, Sulzbach, 1878). For a time he availed himself of the services of the Protestant Bible Society of London to spread his translation among the people, but in 1820 he severed all relations with this society.
