= Martin Boos =

German Roman Catholic theologian

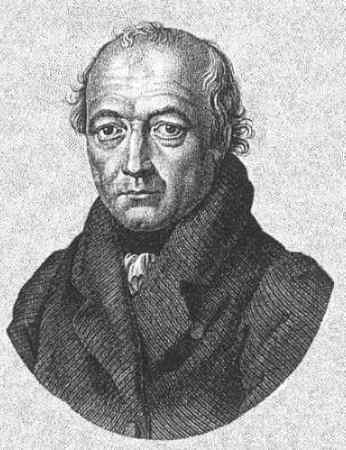
Martin Boos

Martin Boos (25 December 1762 – 29 August 1825) was a German Roman Catholic theologian.

== Life ==
He was born at Huttenried in Bavaria. Orphaned at the age of four, he was reared by an uncle at Augsburg, who finally sent him to the University of Dillingen, where he studied under Sailer, Zimmer, and Weber. There he laid the foundation of the modest piety by which his whole life was distinguished. He had followed the extreme practices of asceticism as a penance for sin, all to no avail, as he believed, and then developed a doctrine of salvation by faith which came very near to pure Lutheranism. This he preached with great effect.

After serving as priest in several Bavarian towns, he was driven from Bavaria by the opposition of the ecclesiastical authorities and other priests. He made his way in 1799 to Linz in Austria, where he was welcomed by Bishop Gall, and set to work first at Leonding and then at Waldneukirchen, becoming in 1806 pastor at Gallneukirchen. His pietistic movement won considerable way among the Catholic laity, and even attracted some fifty or sixty priests.

The death of Gall and other powerful friends, however, exposed him to bitter enmity and persecution from about 1812, and he had to answer endless accusations in the consistorial courts. His enemies followed him when he returned to Bavaria, but in 1817 the Prussian government appointed him to a professorship at Düsseldorf, and in 1819 gave him the pastorate at Sayn near Neuwied. He died in 1825.

His autobiography was edited by Johannes Gossner, Leipzig, 1831, Eng. transl., London, 1836, who also issued two volumes of his sermons Berlin, 1830.

== See also ==
- Johann Michael Sailer
- Johannes Gossner
- Johann Michael Nathanael Feneberg
- Evangelical Catholic
