= Bund für evangelisch-katholische Einheit =

Bund für evangelisch - katholische Wiedervereinigung e.V. (Eng. League for Evangelical-Catholic Reunion, today Bund für evangelisch-katholische Einheit, League for Evangelical-Catholic Unity) is a German Lutheran High Church organisation, founded in 1960.

== Description ==
The League was established for continuation of the Sammlung ("Gathering") movement of Hans Asmussen by some of its members under the leadership of Pastor Max Lackmann. Unlike the Sammlung, they were not willing to work toward unity with Rome by a slow inward catholic renewal of the Protestant Church, but their alternative was to aim to set up of an ecclesiastical organization which would be the means of corporate reunion with Roman Catholic Church; the goal of the League has been to form a separate Lutheran Church, analogous to the Eastern Uniate Churches. This Church would have its own church order, canon law, liturgy, married clergy and catechism, but to the Roman Catholic Church, preserving everything legitimately Evangelical.

Roman Catholic archbishop Lorenz Jaeger appointed a Benedictine abbot as a consultor to the League, and stated that Catholics in Germany may attend conferences of the League without special permission. The work of the League was also known to the Secretariat for Promoting Christian Unity.

Since April 2004 the name has been Bund für evangelisch-katholische Einheit e.V.. Within the League works an order, the Brotherhood of St James. The centre for both is the Hans-Asmussen-Haus in Dalherda near Fulda.

Similarly in Sweden, directly inspired by the League, Förbundet För Kristen Enhet works for reunion of Church of Sweden and Roman Catholic Church. In United States a Lutheran Benedictine monk, Fr Arthur Kreinheder, was the secretary of the League.

== See also ==
- Catholic League (Anglican)
- Anglo-Lutheran Catholic Church
- Ut unum sint
