= St.-Jakobus-Bruderschaft =

St.–Jakobus–Bruderschaft (Brotherhood of St James) is an ecumenical order of Lutheran, Roman Catholic and Eastern Orthodox Christians in Germany within League for Evangelical-Catholic Reunion. It was founded in 1964.

In Christian ecumenism, Brotherhood holds to transsubstantiation, Office of St Peter and honour to Blessed Virgin Mary.

== Rule ==
The spirituality of the Brotherhood is oriented to the example of Saint James and formed by Evangelical counsels, although without celibacy or common life in community. The rule of life includes e.g. daily prayer for reunion, reading of Holy Bible in lectio continua and use of private confession.

The Brotherhood gathers together one a year. One of the most notable members is Hansjürgen Knoche.
