= Johann Michael Nathanael Feneberg =

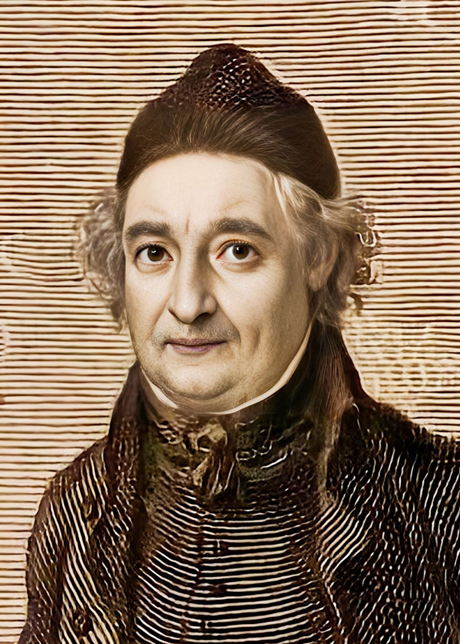
Johann Michael Feneberg

Johann Michael Nathanael Feneberg, born in Oberdorf, Allgäu, Bavaria, February 9, 1751; died October 12, 1812. He studied at Kaufbeuren and in the Jesuit gymnasium at Augsburg, and in 1770 entered the Society of Jesus, at Landsberg, Bavaria. When the Society was suppressed in 1773, he left the town, but continued his studies, was ordained in 1775 and appointed professor in the gymnasium of St. Paul at Ratisbon. From 1778-85 he held a modest benefice at Oberdorf and taught a private school, in 1785 he was appointed professor of rhetoric and poetry at the gymnasium of Dillingen, but was removed in 1793, together with several other professors suspected of leanings towards Illuminism. A plan of studies drawn up by him for the gymnasium brought him many enemies also. He was next given the parish of Seeg comprising some two thousand five hundred and received as assistants the celebrated author Christoph Schmid, and X. Bayer. He was a model pastor in every respect. Within a short time he executed a chart of the eighty-five villages in his parish, and took a census of the entire district.

In the first year of his pastoral service he sustained severe injuries by a fall from his horse, which necessitated the amputation of one leg just below the knee. He bore the operation without an anesthetic, and consoled himself for the loss of the limb by saying: "Non pedibus, sed corde diligimus Deum" (We love God not with our feet but with our hearts). Shortly after, his relations with the priest Martin Boos led him to be suspected of false mysticism. Boos had created such a sensation by his sermons that he was compelled to flee for safety. He took at Seeg with Feneberg, who was a relation and assisted him in parochial for nearly a year. In the meantime he strove to convert or "awaken" Feneberg to life, the life of faith and to the exclusion of good works. Boos's followers were called the Erweckten Brüder (Awakened Brethren). Among these brethren, many of whom were priests, Feneberg was called Nathanael and his two assistants Markus and Silas.

Boos's preaching and conduct at Seeg was reported to the ordinary of Augsburg, and Feneberg, with his assistants, Bayer and Siller, were also involved. In February, 1797, an episcopal commissioner arrived in Seeg, and in Feneberg's absence seized all his papers, private correspondence and manuscripts, and carried them to Augsburg. Feneberg, with his assistants, appeared before an ecclesiastical tribunal at Augsburg in August, 1797; they were required to subscribe to the condemnation of ten erroneous propositions and then permitted to return to their parish. They all protested that they had never held any of the propositions in the sense implied. It does not appear that Feneberg was subsequently molested in this connection, nor did he ever fail to show due respect and obedience to the ecclesiastical authorities. In 1805 he resigned the parish of Seeg and accepted that of Vohringen, which was smaller but returned slightly better revenues. This appointment and the assistance of generous friends enabled him to pay the debts he had incurred on account of his trouble and the political disturbances of the time. For a month before his death he suffered great bodily pain but he prayed unceasingly, and devoutly receiving the sacraments expired.

He remained friendly to Boos even after the latter's condemnation, and regretted that his friend, Bishop Sailer, was not more sympathetic to mysticism. Feneberg was a man of singular piety, candour, and zeal but failed to see the dangers lurking in Boos pietism. Numbers of the disciples of Boos - as many as four hundred at one time - became Protestants, although he himself remained nominally in the Church. Feneberg is the author of a translation of the New Testament, which was published by Bishop Wittmann of Ratisbon.

== See also ==
- Evangelical Catholic
