= Augustana Catholic Church =

Lutheran Anglo-Catholic church

- Classification: Lutheran
- Orientation: Evangelical Catholic
- Polity: Episcopal
- Region: Africa, Caribbean, Latin America
- Founder: Irl Allen Gladfelter
- Origin: 1997
- Branched from: Lutheran Church - Missouri Synod
- Congregations: 19
- Members: 11,100
- Ministers: 22

The Augustana Catholic Church (ACC), formerly the Anglo-Lutheran Catholic Church (ALCC), Augustana Evangelical Catholic Church (AECC), and Evangelical Community Church-Lutheran (ECCL), is a High Church Lutheran or Evangelical Catholic denomination. Founded in 1997 by Metropolitan Archbishop Irl Allen Gladfelter, a former United States Army lieutenant colonel, the church claimed 19 congregations, 6 schools, 22 clergy, and 11,100 members altogether in 2010.

Although it no longer has a presence in the United States as of 2013, the Augustana Catholic Church is active in Haiti and Ecuador, as well as in certain African countries.

== History ==
In 1997, the church was founded as the Evangelical Community Church-Lutheran by former members of the Lutheran Church – Missouri Synod. Founded and initially led by Irl Allen Gladfelter, the church was headquartered in Pittsburgh, Pennsylvania; by January 2004, Gladfelter was episcopally ordained by Peter Paul Brennan, who also ordained him as deacon and priest. Gladfelter was a member of the Anglo-Papalist Order of Corporate Reunion. After his ordination to the episcopacy, an Augustinian order was established within the church.

During Gladfelter's tenure, the denomination accepted papal primacy and infallibility, and clergy were required to sign a mandatum, affirming their rejection of teaching beliefs contrary to Roman Catholic doctrine; by May 2009, the church filed a formal petition to enter full communion with the Latin Church, and in 2011, Gladfelter resigned as primate and reconciled with Roman Catholicism. This occurred as the Congregation for the Doctrine of the Faith invited the then-named Anglo-Lutheran Catholic Church to enter the Roman Catholic Church "through the provisions of Anglicanorum coetibus".

As of 2013, the church was dissolved as a registered non-profit corporation within the United States; it remained active in Latin America and the Caribbean, and Africa.

== Doctrine ==
The Augustana Catholic Church accepted papal primacy and papal infallibility even though it is not under papal control.

== Full communion ==
The Augustana Catholic Church established altar and pulpit fellowship (full communion) with the Association of Evangelical Lutheran Churches.

== See also ==
- Independent Catholic churches
- Porvoo Communion, European communion of Anglican and Lutheran churches
- Bund für evangelisch-katholische Einheit
- Catholic–Lutheran dialogue
- Nordic Catholic Church
