= Incurvatus in se =

Theological phrase

Incurvatus in se (Latin for "turned/curved inward on oneself") is a theological phrase describing a life lived "inward" for oneself rather than "outward" for God and others.

== Overview ==
Paul the Apostle wrote of this condition in the Epistle to the Romans 7:15, 7:18–19:

I do not understand my own actions. For I do not do what I want, but I do the very thing I hate… For I know that nothing good dwells within me, that is, in my flesh. I can will what is right, but I cannot do it. For I do not do the good I want, but the evil I do not want is what I do.

It was perhaps Augustine of Hippo who coined the phrase incurvatus in se. Martin Luther expounded on this in his Lectures on Romans and described this state as:

Our nature, by the corruption of the first sin, [being] so deeply curved in on itself that it not only bends the best gifts of God towards itself and enjoys them (as is plain in the works-righteous and hypocrites), or rather even uses God himself in order to attain these gifts, but it also fails to realize that it so wickedly, curvedly, and viciously seeks all things, even God, for its own sake.

This was later extended by Karl Barth to include other sins beyond pride. It is also believed that, even though people are justified by Jesus dying on the Cross, they still possess a propensity to sin against God because of this condition (i.e. simul justus et peccator).

== See also ==
- Hubris
- Theology of the Cross
