= Robert Kolb =

Professor emeritus at Concordia Seminary

Robert Kolb is Distinguished Professor and Research Fellow at Christ School of Theology at the Institute of Lutheran Theology, professor emeritus of Systematic Theology at Concordia Seminary, St. Louis, Missouri, and a world-renowned authority on Martin Luther and the history of the Reformation.

== Biography and education ==
Robert Kolb was born on June 17, 1941, in Fort Dodge, Iowa. He married Pauline J. Ansorge on August 14, 1965.

He attended Concordia Senior College, Fort Wayne, Indiana, from which he earned the B.A. in 1963. He graduated from Concordia Seminary in St. Louis, Missouri with a Master of Divinity in 1967 and a Master of Sacred Theology in 1968. He attended the University of Wisconsin—Madison from which he obtained an M.A. in 1969 and a Ph.D. in 1973, studying under the prominent Reformation scholar Robert M. Kingdon.

== Scholarship ==
Kolb served as director of the Center for Reformation Research at Concordia Seminary from 1973 to 1977. He then taught at Concordia College in St. Paul, Minnesota, in various roles from 1977 to 1993, including serving as acting president from 1989 to 1990. From there he joined Concordia Seminary as missions professor of Systematic Theology, a position he held until his retirement in 2009. While at Concordia Seminary, he also served as director of the Institute for Mission Studies. From 1994 to 2010, he spent three months each year teaching at educational institutes in other parts of the world.

Kolb has served as associate editor and coeditor of The Sixteenth Century Journal and as co-editor of Lutheran Mission Matters. He has served as president of two academic societies: the Sixteenth Century Studies Conference (1981–1982) and the Society for Reformation Research (1994–1996). He has been a member of the Continuation Committee of the International Congress for Luther Research since 1993, and is a member of the Society for Reformation Research.

Robert Kolb is internationally recognized as one of "the most respected scholars of the Reformation" and "one of the best historians of Luther at work today". His work has garnered multiple accolades and awards, including honorary doctorates from Valparaiso University in 2000; Concordia University in Irvine, California, in 2005; Concordia University in St. Paul, Minnesota, in 2008; and Comenius University in Bratislava, Slovakia, in 2017. In 2013, he was awarded the Hermann Sasse Prize for theological literature by the Lutherische Theologische Hochschule in Oberursel, Germany—the first American to ever receive the award.

A Festschrift in Kolb's honor was published in 2018, entitled From Wittenberg to the World: Essays on the Reformation and its Legacy in Honor of Robert Kolb. In addition to his historical research on the Reformation, the Festschrift highlights several of Kolb's particular contributions to the study of theology, including the recovery of Luther's distinction of the Two Kinds of Righteousness, his emphasis on the Word of God's conversational and performative aspects, and the significance of the created world in all aspects of Christian theology.

Notable among Kolb's numerous publications is the 2000 edition of The Book of Concord, which he edited along with Timothy J. Wengert. Its publication was hailed "a historic moment" by some, although others questioned the edition's use of the September 1531 octave edition of the Augsburg Confession rather than the earlier quarto edition, which has been used in all other editions of the Book of Concord.

== Works ==
=== Author ===
- Andreae and the Formula of Concord: Six Sermons on the Way to Lutheran Unity. Concordia Publishing House, 1977.
- Nikolaus von Amsdorf (1483 - 1565): Popular Polemics in the Preservation of Luther's Legacy. Brill, 1978 (Revised edition:Nikolaus von Amsdorf: Champion of Martin Luther's Reformation. Concordia Publishing House, 2019.)
- For All the Saints: Changing Perceptions of Martyrdom and Sainthood in the Lutheran Reformation. Mercer University Press, 1987.
- Confessing the Faith: Reformers Define the Church, 1530-1580. Concordia Publishing House, 1991.
- The Christian Faith: A Lutheran Exposition. Concordia Publishing House, 1993.
- Speaking the Gospel Today: A Theology for Evangelism. Concordia Publishing House, 1995.
- Martin Luther as Prophet, Teacher, and Hero: Images of the Reformer, 1520-1620. Baker Academic, 1999.
- (With Charles P. Arand) The Genius of Luther's Theology: A Wittenberg Way of Thinking for the Contemporary Church. Baker Academic, 2008
- Martin Luther: Confessor of the Faith. Oxford University Press, 2009.
- Die Konkordienformel. Eine Einführung in ihre Geschichte und Theologie. Oberurseler Hefte Ergänzungsband 8; Göttingen: Edition Ruprecht, 2011.
- Luther and the Stories of God: Biblical Narratives as a Foundation for Christian Living. Baker Academic, 2012.
- Martin Luther and the Enduring Word of God. Baker Academic, 2016.
- (With Carl Trueman |Carl R. Trueman]) Between Wittenberg and Geneva: Lutheran and Reformed Theology in Conversation. Baker Academic, 2017.
- Bound Choice, Election, and Wittenberg Theological Method: From Martin Luther to the Formula of Concord. Fortress Press, 2017.
- Luther's Wittenberg World: The Reformer's Family, Friends, Followers, and Foes. Fortress Press, 2018.
- Martin Luther as He Lived and Breathed. Cascade Books, 2018.
- Luther's Treatise on Christian Freedom and its Legacy. Fortress Press, 2019.

=== Editor ===
- (With Timothy J. Wengert) The Book of Concord: The Confessions of the Evangelical Lutheran Church. Augsburg Fortress, 2000.
- (with James A. Nestingen) Sources and Contests of The Book of Concord. Augsburg Fortress, 2001.
- (With Irene Dingel, Nicole Kuropka, and Timothy J. Wengert) Philip Melanchthon: Theologian in Classroom, Confession, and Controversy. Vandenhoeck & Ruprecht, 2012.
- (With Irene Dingel and L'ubomir Batka) The Oxford Handbook of Martin Luther's Theology. Oxford University Press, 2014.
