= Max Lackmann =

German Lutheran ecumenist

Max Lackmann.

Max Lackmann (28 February 1910 in Erfurt – 11 January 2000 in Fulda) was a German Lutheran ecumenist. Lackmann studied theology at Bonn and Basel as a pupil of Karl Barth.

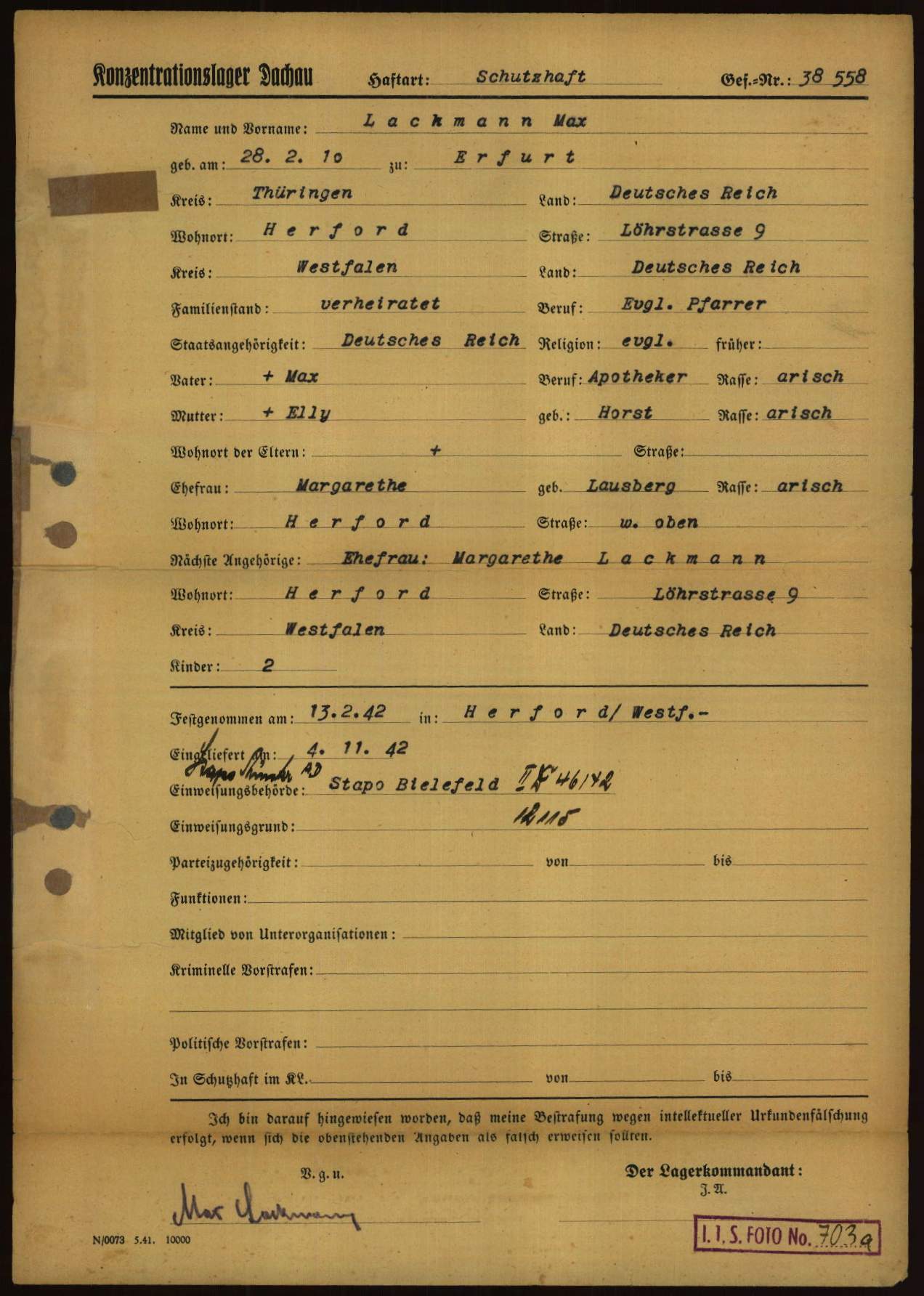
Registration form of Max Lackmann as a prisoner at Dachau Nazi Concentration Camp

He wrote against Nazi ideology, and he had to move from Germany to Basel. When he returned to Germany, he was ordained in 1940 and became pastor in Confessing Church. His preaching in criticism of Nazi regime caused him to be sent to Dachau concentration camp. In there his stay in the "priest block" became to him a profound ecumenical experience, which led him later to dedicate his work to the reunion of the Christendom.

He belonged to the Sammlung movement of Hans Asmussen and had to retire earlier from Protestant church because of his "Catholic tendencies". Lackmann's answer to these accusations was, that “one is either a catholic Christian or one is no Christian.” Lackmann summed up the movement:

"We want to say yes to tradition but no to traditionalism, yes to the office of the Pope but no to papism, yes to the right of the church but no to legalism, yes to the praised mother of the Lord but no to Marianism, yes to the spiritual center of Rome but no to centralism and Romanism."

In his book on the Augsburg Confession, Lackmann asserted that it contains a catholic confession of the ancient faith, and that it holds fast to the connection with the ancient Catholic, and even to the Roman Western Church.

Lackmann founded together with Paul Hacker and Gustav Huhn the League for Evangelical-Catholic Reunion. He took part in the Second Vatican Council as journalist and as an unofficial observer of the League and published its report under the title "Mit evangelischen Augen" (1963)

== Works in English ==
- Evangelical thoughts on the reunion of Christians
- The Augsburg Confession and Catholic Unity (New York: Herder and Herder, 1963),
- The Evangelical Mass. Bund für evangelisch-katholische Wiedervereinigung. Published by Fides Publishers, 1963
