= Johann Gerhard =

Lutheran theologian (1582–1637)

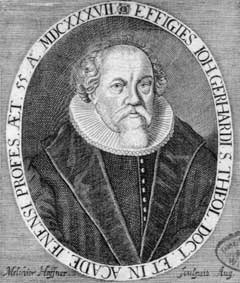
Johann Gerhard

Johannes Gerhard (17 October 1582 – 17 August 1637) was a Lutheran church leader and Lutheran Scholastic theologian during the period of Orthodoxy.

== Biography ==
He was born in the German city of Quedlinburg. During a dangerous illness, at the age of fourteen he came under the personal influence of Johann Arndt, author of Das wahre Christenthum, and resolved to study for the church. He entered the University of Wittenberg in 1599, and studied philosophy and theology. A relative then persuaded him to change his subject, and he studied medicine for two years. In 1603, he resumed his theological reading at Jena, and in the following year received a new impulse from J.W. Winckelmann and Balthasar Mentzer at Marburg. He graduated in 1605 and began to give lectures at Jena, then in 1606 he accepted the invitation of John Casimir, Duke of Coburg, to the superintendency of Heldburg and mastership of the gymnasium Casimirianum Coburg; soon afterwards he became general superintendent of the duchy, in which capacity he was engaged in the practical work of ecclesiastical organization until 1616, when he became the senior theological professor at Jena, where the remainder of his life was spent.

Here, with Johann Major and Johann Himmel, he formed the "Trias Johannea." Though still comparatively young, Gerhard was already regarded as the greatest living theologian of Protestant Germany; in the "disputations" of the period he was always protagonist, and his advice was sought on all public and domestic questions touching on religion or morals. During his lifetime he received repeated calls to almost every university in Germany (e.g. Giessen, Altdorf, Helmstedt, Jena, Wittenberg), as well as to Uppsala in Sweden. He died in Jena.

== Writings ==
His writings are numerous, alike in exegetical, polemical, dogmatic and practical theology. To the first category belong the Commentarius in harmoniam historiae evangelicae de passione Christi (1617), the Comment, super priorem D. Petri epistolam (1641), and also his commentaries on Genesis (1637) and on Deuteronomy (1658). Of a controversial character are the Confessio Catholica (1633–1637), an extensive work which seeks to prove the evangelical and catholic character of the doctrine of the Augsburg Confession from the writings of approved Roman Catholic authors; and the Loci communes theologici (1610–1622), his principal contribution, in which Lutheranism is expounded "nervose, solide et copiose," in fact with a fulness of learning, a force of logic and a minuteness of detail that had never before been approached.

The Meditationes sacrae (1606), a work expressly devoted to the uses of Christian edification, has been frequently reprinted in Latin and has been translated into most of the European languages, including Greek.

== Works ==
- A full listing of printings of Gerhard's works from 1601 to 2002 is in Johann Anselm Steiger, ed., Bibliographia Gerhardina 1601–2002: Verzeichnis der Druckschriften Johann Gerhards (1582–1637) sowie ihrer Neuausgaben, Übersetzungen und Bearbeitungen (Stuttgart-Bad Cannstatt: frommann-holzboog, 2003). ISBN 3-7728-1930-3
- Loci Theologici (1610–1625; reprint, Berlin: Schlawitz, 1863–85), vol. 1 (1625 Exegesis), vol. 3 (1610 Loci), vol. 5, vol. 7, vol. 8, vol. 9, vol. 1-9
- Confessio Catholica (Jena, 1634–37), volume 1, volume 2/1, volume 2/2, volume 2/3, (Frankfurt, 1679).
- Meditationes Sacrae (original Latin text with audio recordings)
- Johann Gerhards Handexemplar der Lutherbibel - Digital copy of Johann Gerhard's personal annotated Bible

=== Translations ===
- Theological Commonplaces: Exegesis, or A More Copious Explanation of Certain Articles of the Christian Religion (1625): On the Nature of Theology and on Scripture, rev. ed., translated by Richard J. Dinda, edited with annotations by Benjamin T. G. Mayes (St. Louis: Concordia Publishing House, 2009). ISBN 978-0-7586-1512-1
- Theological Commonplaces: Exegesis, or A More Copious Explanation of Certain Articles of the Christian Religion (1625): On the Nature of God and On the Most Holy Mystery of the Trinity, translated by Richard J. Dinda, edited with annotations by Benjamin T. G. Mayes (St. Louis: Concordia Publishing House, 2007). ISBN 978-0-7586-0989-2
- Theological Commonplaces: Exegesis, or A More Copious Explanation of Certain Articles of the Christian Religion (1625): On the Person and Office of Christ, translated by Richard J. Dinda, edited with annotations by Benjamin T. G. Mayes (St. Louis: Concordia Publishing House, 2009). ISBN 978-0-7586-1010-2
- Theological Commonplaces: On the Church, translated by Richard J. Dinda, edited with annotations by Benjamin T. G. Mayes (St. Louis: Concordia Publishing House, 2010). ISBN 978-0-7586-1867-2
- Meditations on Divine Mercy, translated by Matthew C. Harrison (St. Louis: Concordia Publishing House, 2003).
- Sacred Meditations, translated by C. W. Heisler (Philadelphia: Lutheran Publication Society, 1896).
- An Explanation of the History of the Suffering and Death of our Lord Jesus Christ, translated by Elmer M. Hohle (Malone, TX: Repristination Press, 1999).
- The External Symbols or Earthly Matter in the Lord's Supper, translated by Nathaniel J. Biebert (Red Brick Parsonage, 2013).
- Commentary on 1 Timothy 4:12, translated by Nathaniel J. Biebert (Red Brick Parsonage, 2012).
- Not Ashamed of the Cross: Commentary on 2 Timothy 1:11–18, translated by Nathaniel J. Biebert (Red Brick Parsonage, 2011).
- Troublesome Times: Commentary on 2 Timothy 3:1–5, translated by Nathaniel J. Biebert (Red Brick Parsonage, 2013).
- The Necessity of Being Persecuted: Commentary on 2 Timothy 3:10-13, translated by Nathaniel J. Biebert (Red Brick Parsonage, 2014).
- Finishing the Race: Commentary on 2 Timothy 4:6–8, translated by Nathaniel J. Biebert (Red Brick Parsonage, 2015).
