= Confessio Catholica =

Book by Johann Gerhard

Confessio catholica is one of the main works of German Orthodox Lutheran theologian Johann Gerhard (1582–1637). It seeks to prove the evangelical and catholic character of the doctrine of the Augsburg Confession from the writings of approved Roman Catholic authors.

Confessio catholica, in qua doctrina catholica et evangelica, quam ecclesiae Augustanae confessioni addictae profilentur, ex Romano-catholicorum scriptorum suffragiis confirmatur (4 parts, Frankfort and Leipsic, 1634–37), is based upon the Catalogus testium veritatis of Flacius. It is more comprehensive than its title denotes, being at the same time an extensive apology and polemic of the Evangelical Creed. The first part is general and treats the principia et media nostrae et pontificiae religionis. The other three volumes treat the disputed articles of faith. Its contents may be compared with Gerhard's Theological Commonplaces: On the Church, an earlier handling with many themes in common with the Confessio Catholica.
