= The two kinds of righteousness =

Lutheran doctrine

The two kinds of righteousness is a Lutheran paradigm (like the two kingdoms doctrine). It attempts to define man's identity in relation to God and to the rest of creation. The two kinds of righteousness is explicitly mentioned in Luther's 1518 sermon entitled "Two Kinds of Righteousness", in Luther's Commentary on the Epistle to the Galatians (1535), in his On the Bondage of the Will, Melanchthon's Apology of the Augsburg Confession, and in the third article of the Formula of Concord. It is also the implicit presupposition governing Luther's On the Freedom of a Christian as well as other works.

In theology "to be righteous is to be human as God envisioned in creation, and again in redemption". Lutherans believe that there are "two dimensions to being a human creature", or two relationships that define human nature. The first dimension defines man's relationship with God and the second defines man's relationship with his human neighbors and the rest of God's creation. “In the former we receive righteousness before God through faith on account of Christ. In the latter, we achieve righteousness in the eyes of the world by works when we carry out our God-given responsibilities.”

== Righteousness coram deo ==
The first kind of righteousness is righteousness Coram Deo ("in the presence of God"). The Reformers also called it passive righteousness, the righteousness of faith, the righteousness of the Gospel, alien righteousness, and Christian righteousness. Robert Kolb has often called it the righteousness of identity, because it restores man's identity as a child of God.

This righteousness "is a righteousness that we receive from God". A person is righteous coram deo, that is, he is in a right relationship with God, when he simply receives the imputed obedience of Christ and the forgiveness of sins through faith. This righteousness is passive and comes apart from the Law. A human person is not righteous in God's eyes because of his choice or commitment, his good works or his piety, his emotions or intellect. Instead, he is righteous because the Father chooses him from the foundation of the world (Eph. 1:3-14) and declares him righteous on account of Jesus’ atoning death and justifying resurrection (Rom.3:21-28, 4:18-25). Thus, Luther describes Abraham's righteousness of faith, saying, "The other kind of righteousness is the righteousness of faith, which does not depend on any works, but on God's favorable regard and his 'reckoning' on the basis of grace". Christian righteousness is freely given by the Spirit through the means of grace (i.e. baptism, the proclamation of forgiveness on account of Christ, the Lord's Supper).

In his sermon "Two Kinds of Righteousness" (1518), Luther compares this alien righteousness to marriage. When a man and a woman are married, they share all things in common. Through faith man is married to Christ. "Through faith in Christ, therefore, Christ's righteousness becomes our righteousness and all that he has becomes ours; rather, he himself becomes ours".

=== Works righteousness ===
Man's relationship with God has always been defined by God's promises and faith. Even before the fall into sin, Adam and Eve were righteous in God's eyes, not because of their obedience, but because God declared them good and they believed. Faith has always defined righteousness coram deo. Thus, righteousness before God cannot depend on human achievement or merit. Such an idea was a sheer impossibility for Luther.

=== Law and Gospel ===
The Lutheran paradigm of Law and Gospel fits within this first dimension. The Law accuses and condemns sinners before God. Any attempt to justify oneself before God with human achievements is an affront to God. The Law condemns such attempts, reveals man's guilt, and crushes his pride. The Gospel brings free forgiveness and raises the sinner to new life. In this dimension the Gospel has the final word.

=== Implications for pastoral ministry ===
When a pastor teaches their people that humanity is made righteous in God's eyes through faith alone, they give all glory to the Lord for saving humankind. The Lutheran Reformers knew that any talk of justification by works would lead to pride. Furthermore, Luther and his colleagues believed that preaching passive righteousness gives complete comfort. It leaves the sinner fully confident that God is their loving Father and that Jesus is their merciful Lord despite their sin.

== Righteousness coram mundo ==
The second kind of righteousness is righteousness coram mundo (righteousness in the eyes of the world). The Reformers also called it active righteousness, civil righteousness, proper righteousness, the righteousness of the Law, and the righteousness of reason or philosophy. Robert Kolb has often called this kind of righteousness the righteousness of character, because it deals with a person's attitudes and behaviors.

A person is righteous coram mundo when he is in a right relationship with the rest of creation and this is done through man's actions. Thus, a righteous parent is a parent that cares for their child, a righteous student is a student who studies hard and respects their teachers, a righteous citizen respects the government and pays their taxes, etc.

This righteousness is active, that is, "the righteousness of works is a righteousness that we achieve by human ability". Thus, this righteousness is informed by the Law (i.e. the good will of God). Unlike the first dimension where the Law only accuses, in the second dimension the Law acts as a guide. The Law shows humanity how God designed the world to work and warns that there are often temporal consequences to sin. Ultimately, "the purpose of a righteousness of works is the welfare of this world", and not humanity's relationship with God.

The righteousness of the Law is defined by a person's vocation. God does not expect the same kinds of works from all people. Furthermore, this righteousness extends to all of creation. Humans have responsibilities to the entire earth and not just their human neighbors.

=== Imperfection of civil righteousness ===
Man is capable of doing great things for his neighbor through his reason and strength. However, these good works are imperfect, tainted by sinful desires and impure motivations. Thus, Luther constantly stressed how active righteousness cannot merit salvation: "Please notice here too the distinction Paul makes by referring to a twofold righteousness of Abraham. First, there is the righteousness of works, or moral and civil righteousness; but he denies that Abraham is justified in God's sight by this, even if he is righteous in the sight of men because of it. With this righteousness, he has indeed something to boast about before men, but like the rest he falls short of the glory of God".

=== Importance of good works ===
While man's commitments and actions cannot earn God's eternal favor and salvation, they are God-pleasing in the sense that God cares for the temporal wellbeing of this world and he is pleased to work through the works of man to care for his creatures.

Furthermore, this second dimension of human existence allows a positive use of the Law (i.e. the Third Use of the Law) and for the study of ethics. Before God the Law only and always accuses because of man's sin, but before the world the Law is a helpful guide that instructs men who are ignorant, deceived by the flesh or the culture, or who are stuck in a moral dilemma.

The two kinds of righteousness paradigm not only prevents works righteousness and synergism, but it also prevents licentiousness and antinomianism. Through this paradigm, Lutherans are capable of confessing both Divine Monergism (i.e. God alone is responsible for salvation) and human responsibility. In other words, salvation by grace alone through faith alone does not take away man's responsibilities within the world.

== Third kind of righteousness? ==
The Lutheran Reformers spoke of active righteousness in two ways. First, they often spoke of active righteousness as something believers and unbelievers have in common. Not only Christians, but also Muslims, Jews, Buddhists, and atheists are capable of being faithful spouses, loving parents, and hard-working employees. Christians and non-Christians perform many of the same external civil works. They often share a common understanding of Ethics. Thus, Melanchthon can praise Aristotle's Nicomachean Ethics as being the best work on civil righteousness ever written.

However, the Reformers also spoke of active righteousness in reference to the new obedience of Christians alone. Thus, the formula states: "It is correct to say that in this life believers who have become righteous through faith in Christ have first of all the righteousness of faith that is reckoned to them and then thereafter the righteousness of new obedience or good works that are begun in them. But these two kinds of righteousness dare not be mixed with each other". Also, Luther defines active righteousness in his 1518 sermon as the "product of the righteousness of the first type, actually its fruit and consequence".

Because of this, some Lutheran theologians (such as Joel Biermann) have recommended speaking of a third kind of righteousness—the active righteousness of a Christian resulting from the work of the Spirit.

There is value in talking about two kinds of righteousness and three kinds. On the one hand, the active righteousness of a Christian and of an unbeliever is the same, for both do the same external works in the same vocations. For example, a person cannot tell the difference between a faithful Christian employee and a faithful non-believing employee by sight. In a certain respect, a Christian's active righteousness is different only because the sin that taints it has been forgiven. In other words, the righteousness coram deo sanctifies the righteousness coram mundo.

On the other hand, the Bible does make a distinction between the active righteousness of believers and the active righteousness of unbelievers. In the end only the good works of Christians are God-pleasing. On the Last Day, Jesus will praise only the works of the sheep and will only condemn the works of the goats (Matt. 25:31-46). Furthermore, the Spirit works within the Christian after conversion. The Spirit gives the Christian virtuous, holy desires (commonly called the fruits of the Spirit) and crucifies his sinful flesh. The Spirit-led Christian eagerly looks to the Law of God, which no longer can accuse his conscience, so that it may guide him, whereas the non-believer always seeks guidance from man-made laws and philosophies that are full of error. In other words, Christian righteous will lead to new obedience.

Both ways of describing active righteousness are biblical and were used by the Lutheran Reformers. Therefore, it is acceptable to speak of either two kinds of righteousness or three, and it is also acceptable to define active righteousness as the works done by both believers and unbelievers or as the new obedience that occurs after conversion.

== Other references ==
The Lutheran theologian Francis Pieper briefly mentions the two kinds of righteousness paradigm in his Christian Dogmatics:

In the terminology of Luther there are ‘two kinds’ of forgiveness of sins, or of justification, the ‘internal’ and the ‘external.’ The internal justification takes place through the gracious promise of the Gospel and through faith which lays hold of this promise. External justification takes place through the good works of Christians, which, as the consequence and fruit of the internal justification, prove to men that internal justification is there.

Theologians outside of the Lutheran Church have also noted and used this paradigm. For example, Jonathan Edwards mentions the two kinds of righteousness paradigm in a famous sermon on justification:

There is a two-fold righteousness that the saints have: an imputed righteousness, and ‘tis this only that avails anything to justification; and an inherent righteousness, that is, that holiness and grace which is in the hearts and lives of the saints. This is Christ’s righteousness as well as imputed righteousness: imputed righteousness is Christ’s righteousness accepted for them, inherent holiness is Christ’s righteousness communicated to them. They derive their holiness from Christ as the fountain of it. He gives it by his Spirit, so that ‘tis Christ’s holiness communicated, ‘tis the light of the sun reflected. Now God takes delight in the saints for both these: both for Christ’s righteousness imputed and for Christ’s holiness communicated, though ‘tis the former only that avails anything to justification.
