= Henri Valois =

French historian and philologist (1603–1676)

Henri Valois (French pronunciation: [ɑ̃ʁi valwa]; September 10, 1603, in Paris – May 7, 1676, in Paris) or in classical circles, Henricus Valesius, was a philologist and a student of classical and ecclesiastical historians. He is the elder brother to Adrien Valois (1607–1692), who described his life in a biography (first published in 1677), which is the basis for all modern biographies of Henri Valois.

== Life ==
Belonging to a family of Norman gentry settled near Bayeux and Liseux, Valois studied under the Jesuits, first at Verdun and then at the Collège de Clermont at Paris, where he studied rhetoric under Denis Pétau. He studied law at Bourges (1622–24) and returned to Paris, where, to please his father, he practised law against his inclination for seven years. When he regained his liberty he plunged into classical studies, which he had never entirely abandoned.

At first he had only the slender means left him by his father, but later pensions from President Jean-Antoine de Mesmes of the parlement of Paris, the clergy of France, Cardinal Mazarin, and Louis XIV provided him with the necessary leisure and the assistance of a secretary, for his sight was never good, and as early as 1637 he ceased to have the use of his right eye. In 1664, when he was nearly blind, he married the young Marguerite Chesneau and had by her four sons and three daughters.

== Works ==
Nicolas-Claude Fabri de Peiresc had purchased a manuscript in Cyprus containing the work of Constantine Porphyrogenitus on virtue and vice. Valois took from it numerous previously unedited fragments of earlier historians, which he published in 1634: Polybii, Diodori Siculi, Nicolai Damasceni, Dionysii Halicarnassii, Appiani, Alexandri, Dionis et Ioannis antiocheni excerpta.

In 1636 he edited Ammiani Marcellini rerum gestarum libri XVIII, with abundant notes which illumined all the history of that period and its institutions, together with two fragments, one from an Origo Constantini (ca. 340) and one dating from ca. 527; although unconnected with each other, these two items are still usually printed together under his name, Anonymus Valesianus. He succeeded in recognizing the rhythm of the phrases in the establishment of the text, at the same time making no display of his discovery. This edition was revised and enlarged by his brother Adrien in 1681.

In 1650, the assembly of the French clergy commissioned him to publish the ecclesiastical historians, after Mons. Charles de Montchal, archbishop of Toulouse, was compelled to resign the task. In 1659 he issued Eusebius of Caesarea's Ecclesiastical History, and biography and panegyric of Constantine, as well as Constantine's discourse in the assembly: Eusebii Pamphili ecclesiasticae historiae libri decem . . . De vita Imp. Constantini . . . Oratio Constantini ad sanctos, & panegyricus Eusebii. The text was accompanied by a new Latin translation, scholarly notes and four dissertations (on Donatism, the name Anastasis as applied to the Church of the Holy Sepulchre, the Septuagint, and the Roman Martyrology). In 1668 he published Socrates of Constantinople and Sozomen with three books of observations on the history of Saint Athanasius, on that of Paul, Bishop of Constantinople, and the sixth canon of Nicaea (against Lamouy). In 1673, he completed his book with Theodoret, Evagrius, and the excerpts from Philostorgius and Theodorus Lector: Socratis, Sozomeni, Theodoreti et Evagrii Historia ecclesiastica.

He did important work, and though the manuscripts at his disposal were not always the best, his tact and the certainty of his criticism was admirable. His temperate and sanely learned notes are excellent documents of the French learning of the seventeenth century. Valois was associated with the greatest scholars of his time, with whom however he always maintained his liberty of judgment. He wrote the funeral eulogies of Jacques Sirmond, Pierre Depuy, and Denis Pétau. He also wrote several occasional Latin poems, but to posterity he is the learned and exact editor of the Greek ecclesiastical historians.
