= Conant family =

Prominent American family

Conant
- Arms: Per saltire gules and azure billetée or; Crest: On a mount vert a stag proper, the dexter foreleg resting on a shield gules billetée or
- Current region: England, United States, Canada
- Origin: England
- Seat: Lyndon Hall, Rutland
- Titles: Baronet, of Lyndon in the County of Rutland
- Style: Sir
- Motto: Conanti Dabitur (It shall be given to him who tries.)
- Website: www.lyndon-estate.co.uk/index.html

The Conant family is a distinguished aristocratic family of English origin.

== History ==
The Conant surname is thought to be of Celtic, possibly Breton origin. The earliest known member of the most prominent line of the family was John Conant, a yeoman of East Budleigh, Devon. His son Richard (1548–1630), had eight children including his second son Robert (c. 1583–1638) and his youngest child Roger (c. 1592–1679).

Robert Conant's eldest son the Rev. John Conant (1608–1694) was a noted theologian who was Regius Professor of Divinity and Vice-Chancellor of Oxford University. John Conant's great-grandson Nathaniel (1745–1822) served as Chief Magistrate of the Bow Street Magistrates' Court and was knighted in 1813, when he was granted official sanction to use his claimed ancestral arms by virtue of a new grant, as the College of Arms had been unable to establish the family's right to them through its records. In 1862, Nathaniel's grandson Edward Nathaniel Conant (1820–1901) inherited his maternal uncle's estate and family seat at Lyndon Hall in the county of Rutland, where the family continues to reside. Edward's grandson Sir Roger Conant, 1st Baronet (1899–1973) was a Conservative Party Member of Parliament (MP) who served as Comptroller of the Household from 1951 to 1954 and was created a baronet in 1954.

Roger Conant, the youngest child of Richard, emigrated to the Plymouth Colony in 1624, establishing the North American line of the Conant family. Disliking the increasingly repressive government at Plymouth, he soon left and was appointed the first governor of an English settlement on Cape Ann, subsequently founding the town of Salem, Massachusetts. There are numerous notable descendants of Roger.

The following genealogical tree illustrates the links among the notable family members:

== Family tree ==
- Richard Conant (1548–1630)
  - Robert Conant (c. 1583–1638)
    - Rev. John Conant (1608–1694)
      - Robert Conant (1670–1756)
        - Rev. John Conant (1706–1779)
          - Sir Nathaniel Conant (1745–1822)
            - John Edward Conant (1777–1848)
              - Edward Nathaniel Conant (1820–1901)
                - Ernest William Proby Conant (1852–1920)
                  - Sir Roger Conant, 1st Baronet (1899–1973)
                    - Sir John Conant, 2nd Baronet (1923–2024)
                      - Sir Simon Conant, 3rd Baronet (born 1958)
  - Roger (c. 1592–1679)
    - Lot Conant (1624–1674)
      - Nathaniel Conant (1650–1732)
        - Nathaniel Conant (1679–1745)
          - Jeremiah Conant (1720–c. 1755)
            - Roger Conant (1748–1821)
              - Thomas Conant (1782–1838)
                - Daniel Conant (1818–1879)
                  - Thomas Conant (1842–1905)
                    - Gordon Daniel Conant (1885–1953)
          - John Conant (1725–c. 1816)
            - Jeremiah Conant (1758–1828)
              - Thomas Conant (1807–1892)
                - James Scott Conant (1844–1922)
                  - James Bryant Conant (1893–1978)
                    - Theodore Richards Conant (1926–2015)
                      - James F. Conant (b. 1958)
                      - Jennet Conant (b. 1959)
      - John Conant (1652–1724)
        - Lot Conant (1679–1767)
          - Robert Conant (1699–1773)
            - Samuel Conant (c. 1722–1785)
              - Samuel Conant (c. 1752–1808)
                - Jacob Conant (1783–1839)
                  - Edwin Conant (1810–1891)
          - Andrew Conant (b. 1703)
            - Andrew Conant (1725–1805)
              - Zebulon Conant (b. 1749)
                - Andrew Conant (1796–1877)
                  - Lovander Wright Conant (1821–1898)
                    - Alonzo H. Conant (1849–1919)
                      - Frank Hall Conant (1880–1941)
                        - Norman Francis Conant (1908–1984)
          - William Conant (1707–1756)
            - William Conant (1732–1804)
              - Levi Conant (1767–1842)
                - Levi Conant (1810–1892)
                  - Sherman Conant (1839–1890)
                  - Levi L. Conant (1857–1916)
      - Lot Conant (1657–c. 1745)
        - Jonathan Conant (1692–1749)
          - Jonathan Conant (1737–?)
            - Jonathan Conant (1760–1829)
              - William Conant (1802–1890)
                - Charles Edwin Conant (1832–1912)
                  - Charles Arthur Conant (1861–1915)
      - William Conant (1667–c. 1754)
        - David Conant (1698–1789)
          - Jonathan Conant (1734–1820)
            - Josiah Conant (1768–1801)
              - Jonathan Conant (1793–1863)
                - Jonathan Josiah Conant (1823–1908)
                  - Samuel Dimick Conant (1851–1936)
                    - William Chester Conant (1884–1973)
                      - David Perry Conant (1913–2005)
                        - David Stoughton Conant (1949–2018)
      - Roger Conant (1668–1745)
        - Ebenezer Conant (1698–1794)
          - Ebenezer Conant (1743–1783)
            - John Conant (1773–1856)
              - Thomas Jefferson Conant (1802–1891) m. Hannah O'Brien Chaplin (1809–1865)
                - S. S. Conant (1831–?) m. Helen S. Conant (1839–1899)
            - Calvin Conant (1779–1829)
              - Charles Rich Conant (1807–1863)
                - Carlos Conant Maldonado (1842–1907)
        - Josiah Conant (1711–1756)
          - Abel Conant (1755–1844)
            - Abel Conant (1784–1875)
              - John H. Conant (1823–1876) m. Frances Ann (Crowell) Conant (1831–1875)
    - Exercise Conant (1637–1722)
      - Caleb Conant (1683–1727)
        - Benajah Conant (1716–1798)
          - Jonathan Conant (1761–1810)
            - Caleb Conant (1791–1877)
              - Alban Jasper Conant (1821–1915)

== See also ==
- Conant baronets
- Conant
