= John Conant (disambiguation) =

John Conant was an English theologian.

John Conant may also refer to:

- John A. Conant, Wisconsin politician
- Sir John Ernest Michael Conant, 2nd Baronet (1923–2024) of the Conant baronets

== See also ==
- Kenneth John Conant, architectural historian
- Conant (disambiguation)
