= Roger Conant =

Roger Conant may refer to:

- Roger Conant (colonist) (c. 1592–1679), leader of the company of fishermen who founded Salem, Massachusetts
- Sir Roger Conant, 1st Baronet (1899–1973), British Conservative Party politician
- Roger Conant (herpetologist) (1909–2003), American herpetologist, author, educator and conservationist

== See also ==
- Conant (disambiguation)
