= Conant =

Conant is a pictish surname, and means mighty. It may refer to:

- Adam Conant, fictional character
- The Conant family, an Anglo-American family with English, Canadian and American branches, and its members, including:
  - Carlos Everett Conant (1870–1925), American linguist
  - Charles "Carlos" Conant Maldonado (1842–1907), Mexican businessman, colonel, and politician
  - Charles Arthur Conant (1861–1915), American economist
  - David Stoughton Conant (1949–2018), American botanist
  - Frances Augusta Hemingway Conant (1842–1903), American journalist, editor, businesswoman
  - Gordon Conant (1885–1953), Canadian politician
  - James Bryant Conant (1893–1978), American chemist and President of Harvard University
  - James F. Conant (born 1958), American philosopher
  - Jennet Conant, American journalist and author
  - John Conant (1608–1694), English clergyman and university vice-chancellor
  - Levi Conant (1857–1916), American mathematician
  - Norman Francis Conant (1908–1984), American medical mycologist
  - Roger Conant (colonist) (c.1592–1679), early Massachusetts settler and founder of the American line of the family.
  - Sir Roger Conant, 1st Baronet (1899–1973), British politician
  - Roger Conant (herpetologist) (1909–2003), American herpetologist
  - Thomas Jefferson Conant (1802–1891), American Bible scholar
  - William A. Conant (1816–1909), American merchant, politician, and railroad agent
- Other individuals surnamed Conant, including:
  - Deborah Henson-Conant (born 1953), American harpist
  - Douglas Conant, American businessman
  - Frederic Conant (1892–1974), American yacht racer
  - Kenneth John Conant (1894–1984), American architectural historian
  - Marcus Conant (born 1936), American dermatologist and HIV/AIDS expert
  - Ralph W. Conant (born 1926), American urban planner
  - Scott Conant (born 1971), American chef
  - Susan Conant, American mystery writer
- James B. Conant High School, a public school in Hoffman Estates, Illinois.
- Conant Public Library, public library of Winchester, New Hampshire

== See also ==
- conan (disambiguation)
