= Chicago Union Stock Yards fire =

Chicago Union Stock Yards fire may refer to:

- Chicago Union Stock Yards fire (1910), 21 firefighters and 3 civilians killed
- Chicago Union Stock Yards fire (1934), second-most destructive Chicago fire in terms of property loss
