= James Reeve Stuart =

American painter and Confederate soldier (1834-1915)

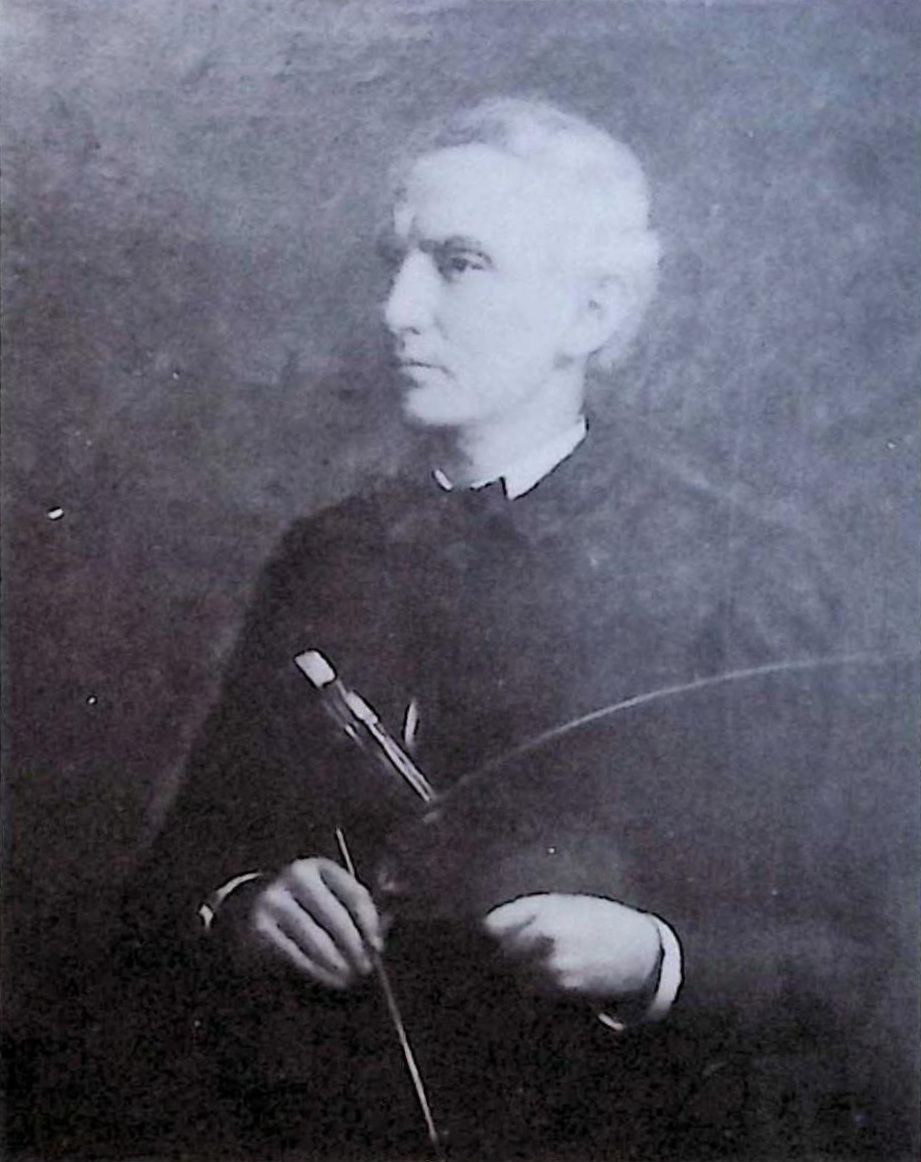
- Self-portrait
- Born: February 9, 1834; Beaufort, South Carolina U.S.
- Died: December 23, 1906 (aged 72); Madison, Wisconsin U.S.
- Education: South Carolina College, University of Virginia, Fine Arts Academy in Karlsruhe, Fine Arts Academy in Munich
- Known for: portraiture

James Reeve Stuart (9 February 1834, Beaufort, South Carolina - 23 December 1915, Madison, Wisconsin) was an American portrait painter and Confederate Army soldier in the American Civil War.

== Biography ==
=== Birth and childhood on Port Royal Island (1834–1851) ===
Born in Beaufort, in the Sea Islands region, on February 9, 1834, James Reeve Stuart was the third of six children of Mary Howe Barnwell (1812–1876) and her husband, Colonel Middleton Stuart (1806–1840).

Born into a family of Irish descent who had settled in South Carolina in the early 18th century, Mary Howe Barnwell inherited from her father a cotton plantation, cultivated by slaves, and a planter's house named Roupelmond (or Rouplemonde). This property was located at the northern tip of Port Royal Island, 10 miles to the north of Beaufort, near the ferry that allowed crossing the Coosaw River before the construction of the current bridge between Seabrook and Lobeco. After the untimely death of Colonel Stuart, the operation of the plantation was taken over by his widow with the help of one of James' uncles.

=== Education (1852–1861) ===
After studying at South Carolina College in Columbia in 1852 and then at the University of Virginia in Charlottesville in 1853, James R. Stuart entered Harvard College at Cambridge, which he quit without graduating in 1854. It was during this stay in Massachusetts that the young man, who had always been passionate about drawing, truly began his artistic training: after going every Saturday to the Boston Athenæum to copy plaster casts and paintings, he began learning to paint in the studio of Joseph Ames, to whom he had been recommended by the politician Robert C. Winthrop, a former classmate of James's uncle, the former senator Robert Woodward Barnwell.

As the latter was one of the administrators of Beaufort College, James Stuart obtained a position as a substitute English teaching assistant there, which he held from January to June 1855. Once this temporary position was completed, he worked for a time as an accountant's clerk in Savannah, where he lived with an uncle, the Episcopal Bishop of Georgia, Stephen Elliott, who offered him a position as an assistant at Chatham Academy.

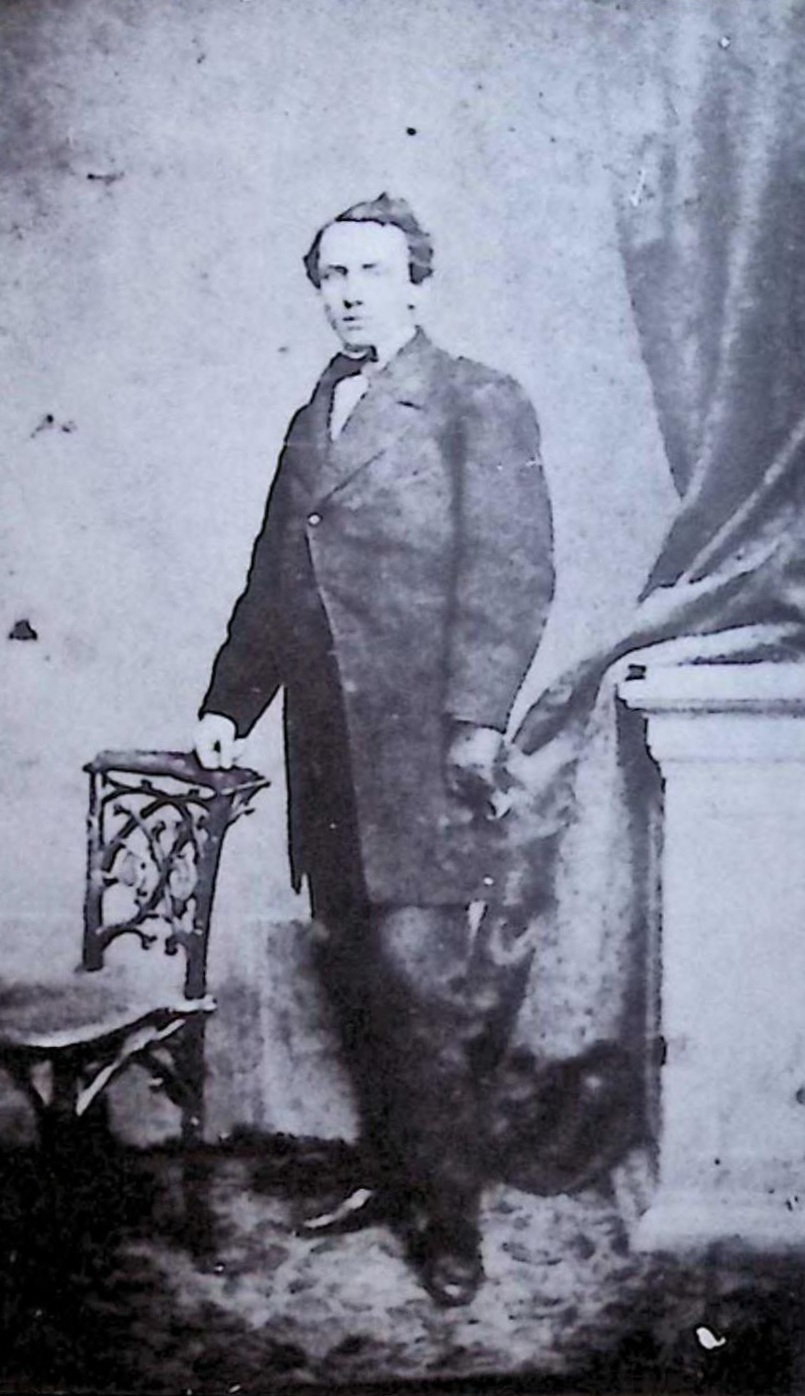
Photography of Stuart during his studies in Germany (1858–1861).

Eager to complete his education in Europe, Stuart embarked at Charleston for Le Havre, accompanied by his cousin Robert Hayne Barnwell. The two young men arrived in Karlsruhe in the summer of 1858. While "Rob" studied at the Polytechnic School in that city, the young artist attended classes at the Academy of Fine Arts in the capital of the Grand Duchy of Baden. After a brief period at the Munich Academy of Fine Arts (1859–1860), where he was the third American student enrolled, Stuart preferred to return to the Karlsruhe Academy, where his teacher was Ludwig des Coudres (1860–1861).

=== Civil War (1861–1865) ===
Having learned of the outbreak of the Civil War, Stuart returned to America and joined the Beaufort Volunteer Artillery to defend South Carolina against the Union army. Promoted to sergeant after the Battle of Port Royal (November 7, 1861), he was demoted to corporal during the reorganization of the regiments in March 1862. In addition to his artillery service, he served on detached missions with the engineers. He fought at Pocotaligo, where the Confederates were attempting to protect the Charleston-Savannah Railroad, and participated in the raid on Pinckney Island and then the Battle of Honey Hill (November 30, 1864). One of his brothers, Allan, died of his wounds on January 1, 1864. In March 1865, Stuart took part in the Battle of Averasborough, during which his younger brother Henry was killed, and then in the Battle of Bentonville.

The war was a disaster for James Stuart, who lost two of his brothers. Furthermore, Roupelmond's planter's house was destroyed by bombing, while a large portion of the plantation, confiscated by the Union government in March 1863, was sold off in lots to freed slaves.

=== From Augusta to Saint Louis (1865–1872) ===
After the Confederate surrender, Stuart went to Georgia, where his mother had taken refuge. Having failed to secure a place in a school, he opened a painting studio in Augusta. He worked there for six months before following his family, first to a nearby plantation managed by his brother Middleton, and then to his hometown of Beaufort. Through his uncle Henry Stuart, he found a position with the Coast Survey Commission, where he carried out surveying and mapping work.

He then joined his cousin Barnwell Stuart in Memphis, Tennessee, where he worked for a time for the engineer in charge of the hydraulic works before returning to painting, without much success. He then left for St. Louis, where he lived and worked for five years, from 1868 to 1872, although he found the city uncomfortable and unpleasant. During this period, his students included Harry Chase and Paul E. Harney. He also occasionally traveled to Iowa City, Lexington, Kentucky and, most notably, Madison, the capital of Wisconsin, which he discovered in 1872 and where he decided to settle at the beginning of the following year.

=== Madison (1873–1915) ===
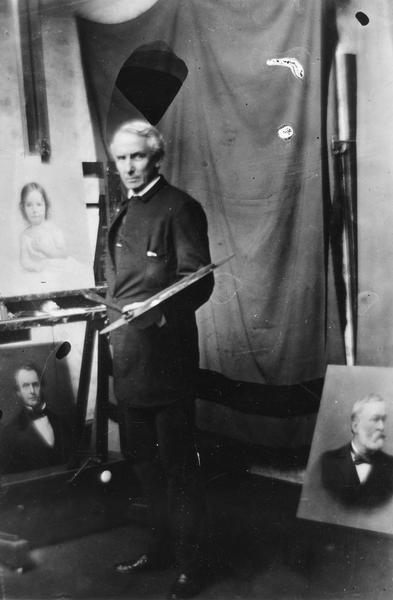
Photography of Stuart in his atelier (1900).

It was in Madison that James R. Stuart met Mary Hall (1833–1886), widow of Mr. Jacob of Louisville, whom he married on January 12, 1876, in Elizabethtown. Widowed ten years later, Stuart remarried on December 6, 1893, to Theodora "Dora" Antill Tappan (1860–1906), a friend of his niece Katie Jacob. The couple had four children: Frances Tappan Stuart (1894–1976), Janet MacIndoe Stuart (1896–1905), James Reeve Stuart Jr. (1898–1962), and Rachel Bromby Stuart (1899–1982).

Active in Madison for 42 years, Stuart also worked in Chicago, notably for the Saddle & Sirloin Club from 1903 (but these portraits were destroyed in 1934, during the Union Stock Yards fire). He also taught at the University of Wisconsin-Madison and Milwaukee College.

Stuart produced a large number of portraits of prominent Wisconsin figures. About thirty of these works belong to the Wisconsin Historical Museum, which houses the collections of Wisconsin Historical Society, of which Stuart was a member of the Board of Curators between 1877 and 1888. Some of the artist's paintings are based on photographs, such as the posthumous portrait of the Norwegian violinist Ole Bull (1890, Wisconsin Historical Society).

He also painted several copies of paintings by famous American portraitists, including the portrait of Elihu B. Washburne by George Peter Alexander Healy (circa 1888, Chicago History Museum) and of Henry Gratiot, father in law of Washburne, by Chester Harding (1884, Wisconsin Historical Museum).

In 1907, he wrote a short autobiography, which focused mainly on his childhood on the family plantation.

James Reeve Stuart died from an attack of pneumonia at St. Mary Hospital Madison on 29 December 1915, aged 81.

== Gallery ==
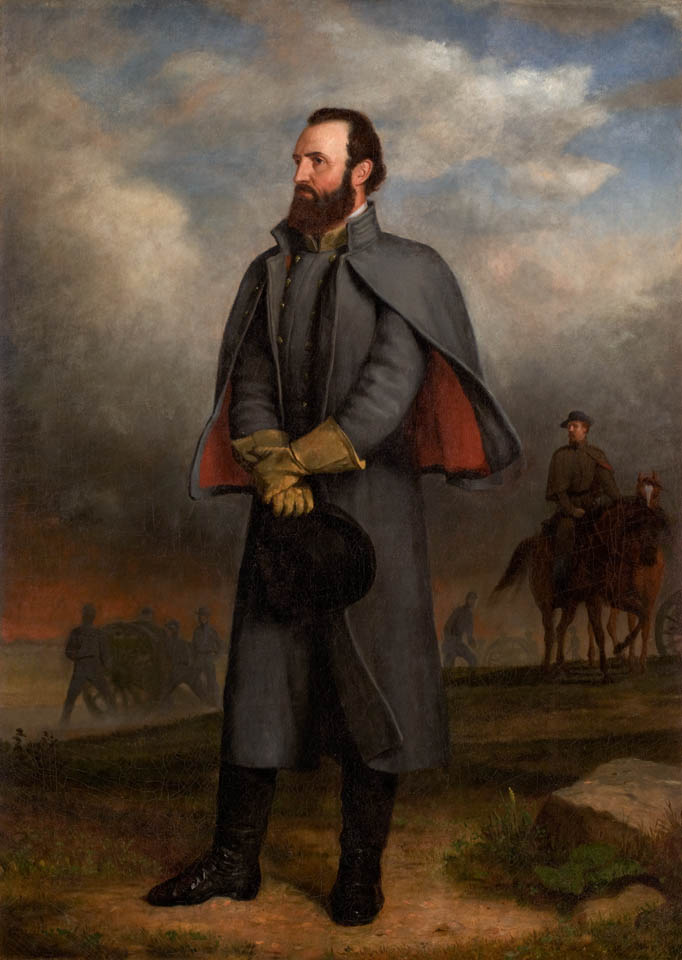
Thomas Jonathan Jackson, 1869, Spartanburg, Johnson Collection.

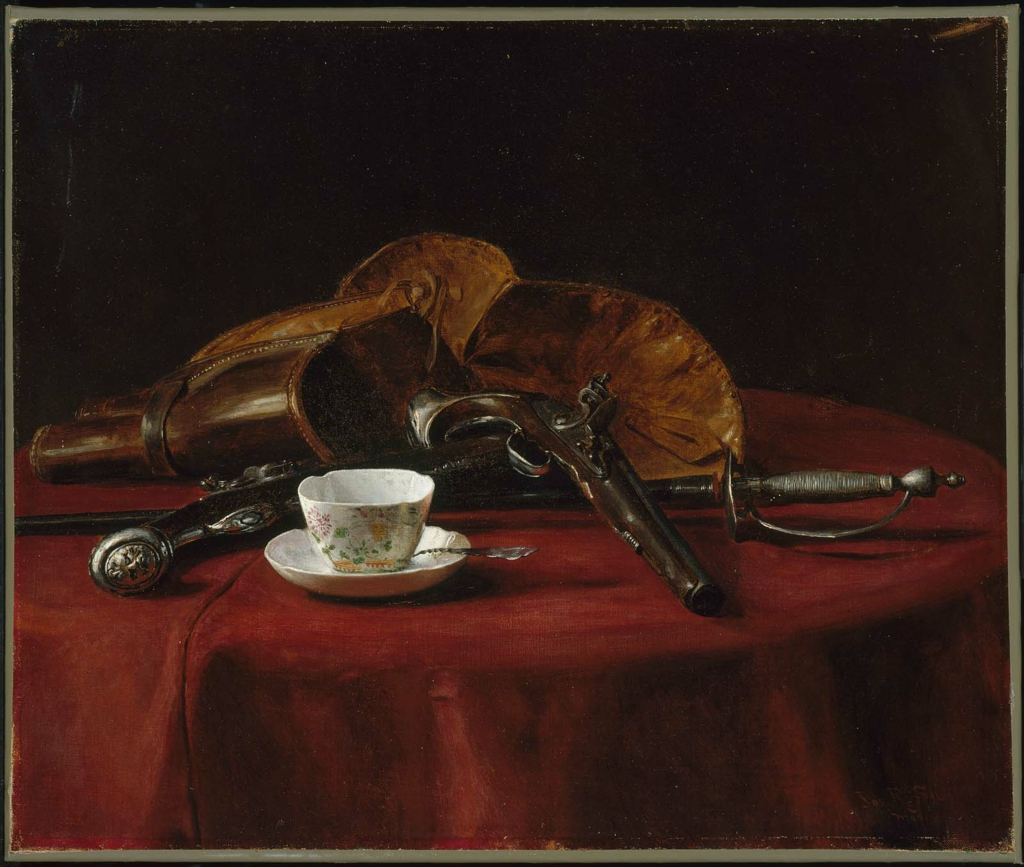
Sword, pistols and cup, after 1872, Museum of Fine Arts, Boston.

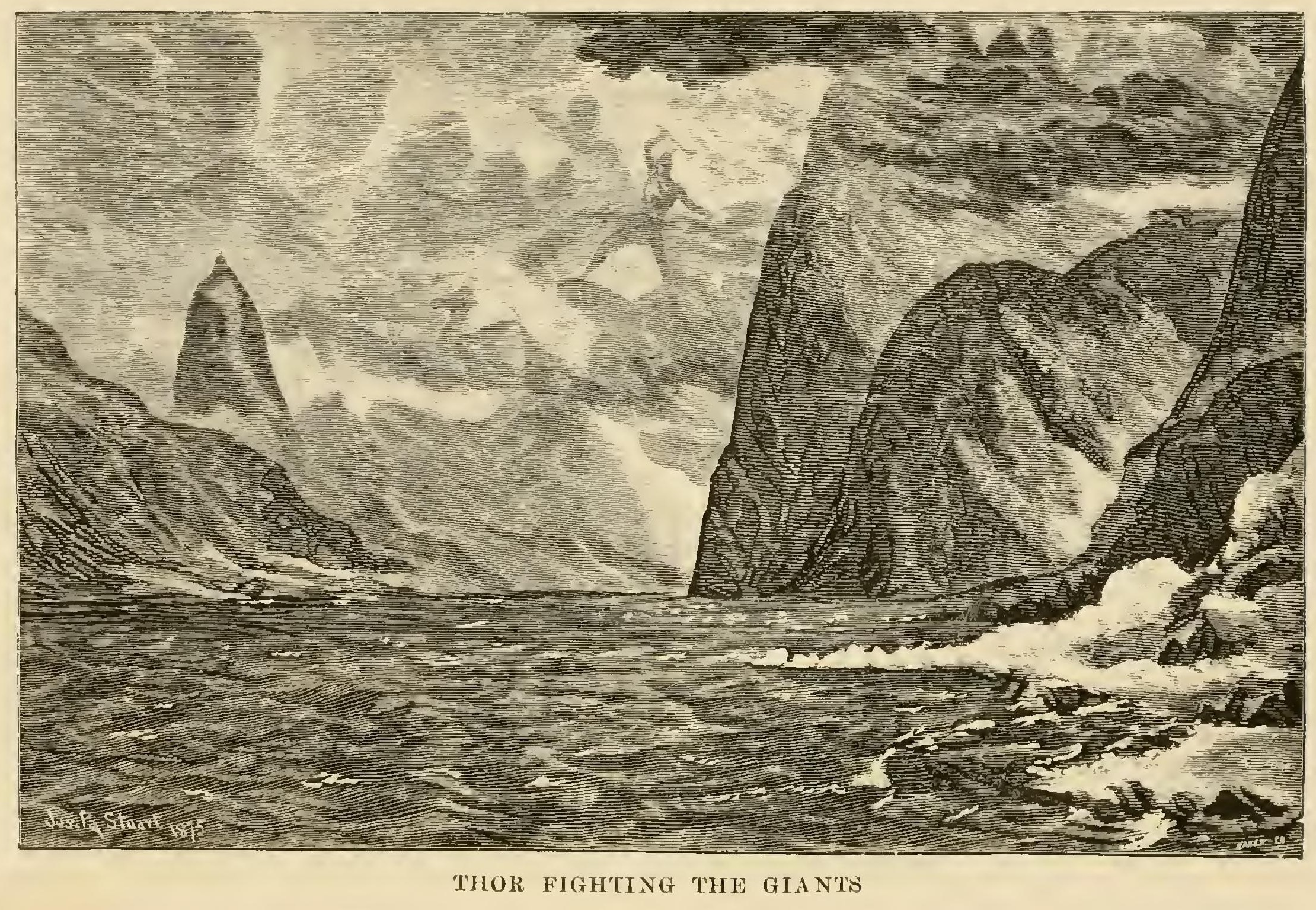
Thor fighting the giants, engraving after painting (Rasmus B. Anderson, Norse Mythology, Chicago, 1875).

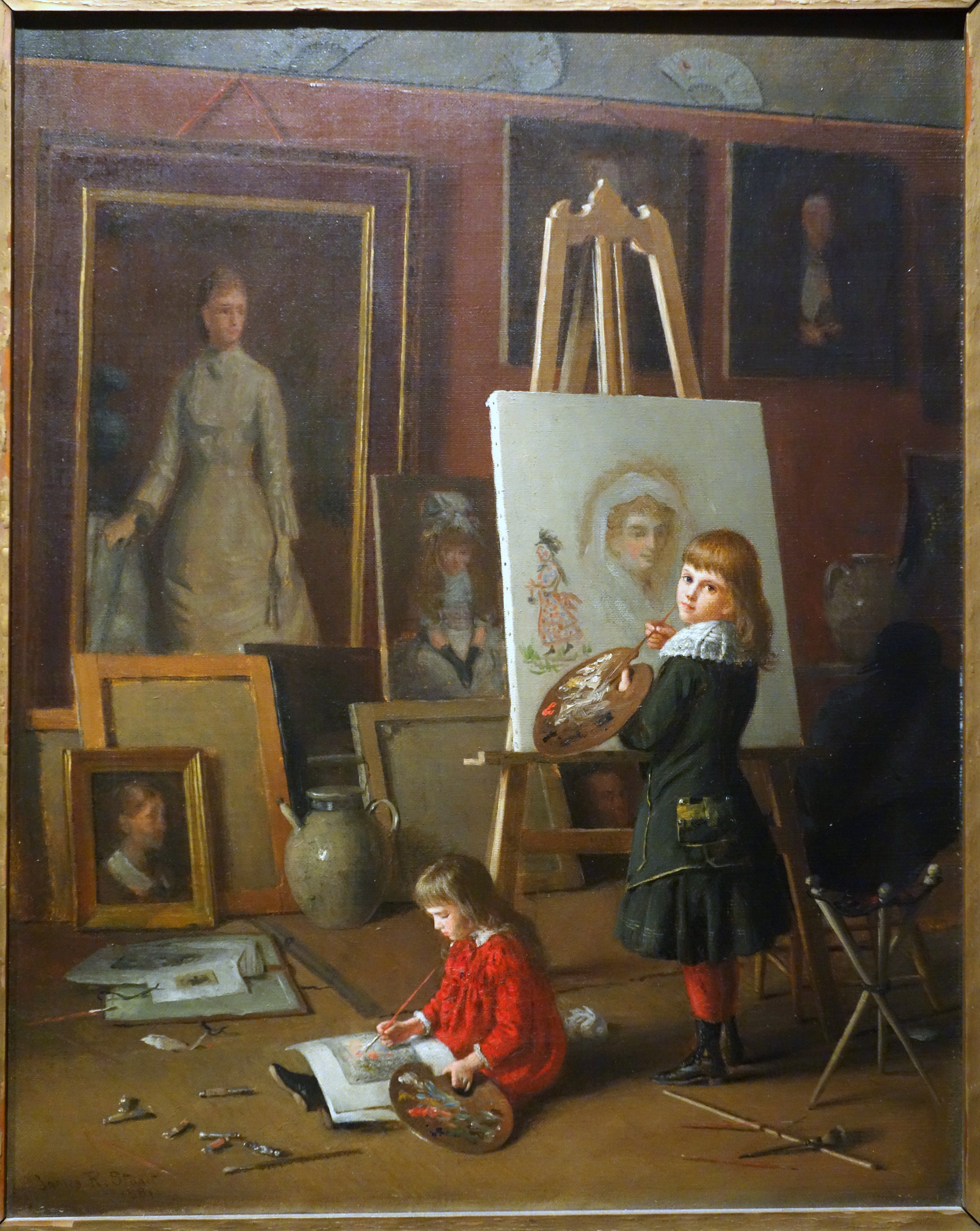
Painting lesson (Grace and Teresa Josephine Fitch), 1881, Wisconsin Historical Museum.

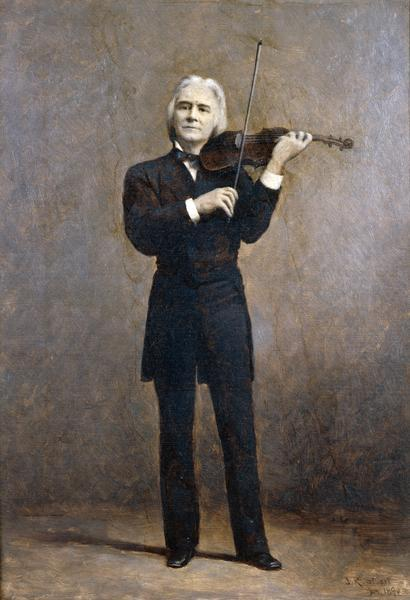
Ole Bull, 1890, Wisconsin Historical Society.

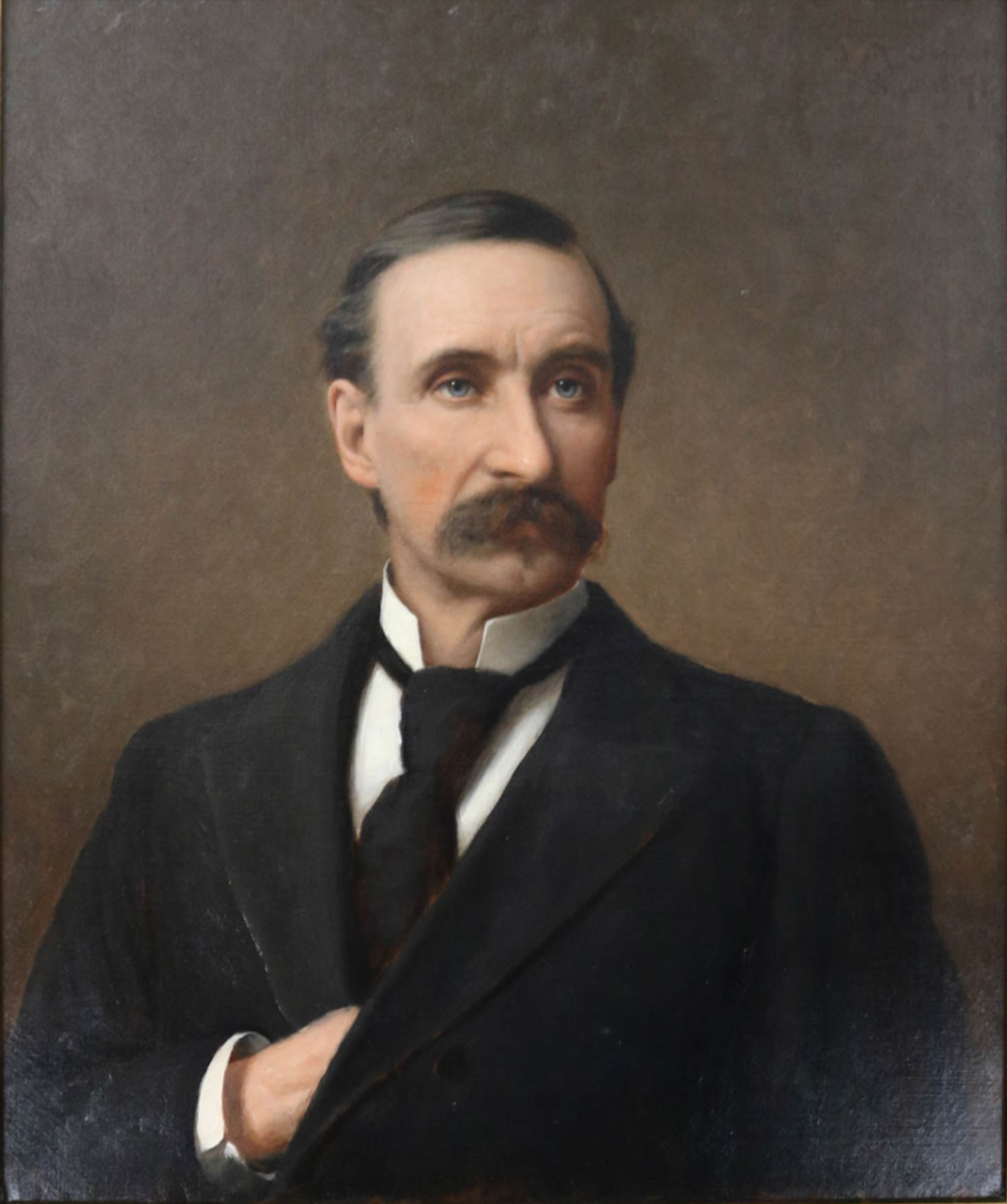
William D. Hoard, 1891, Wisconsin Historical Society.

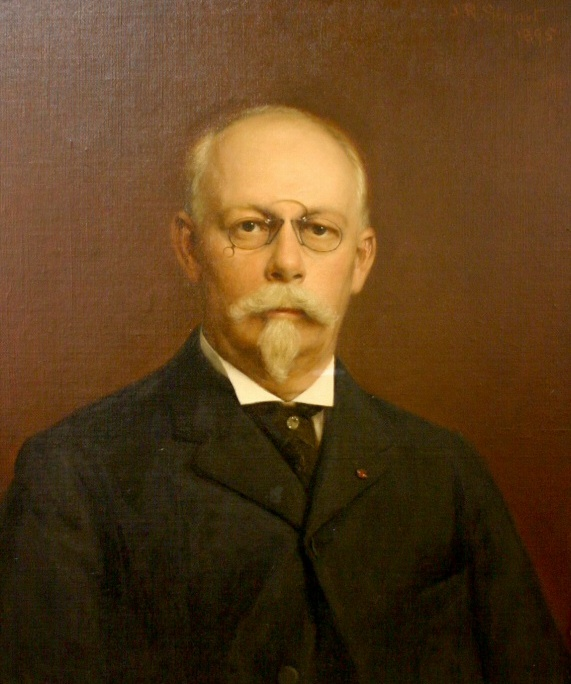
George Wilbur Peck, 1895 (?), Wisconsin Historical Society.

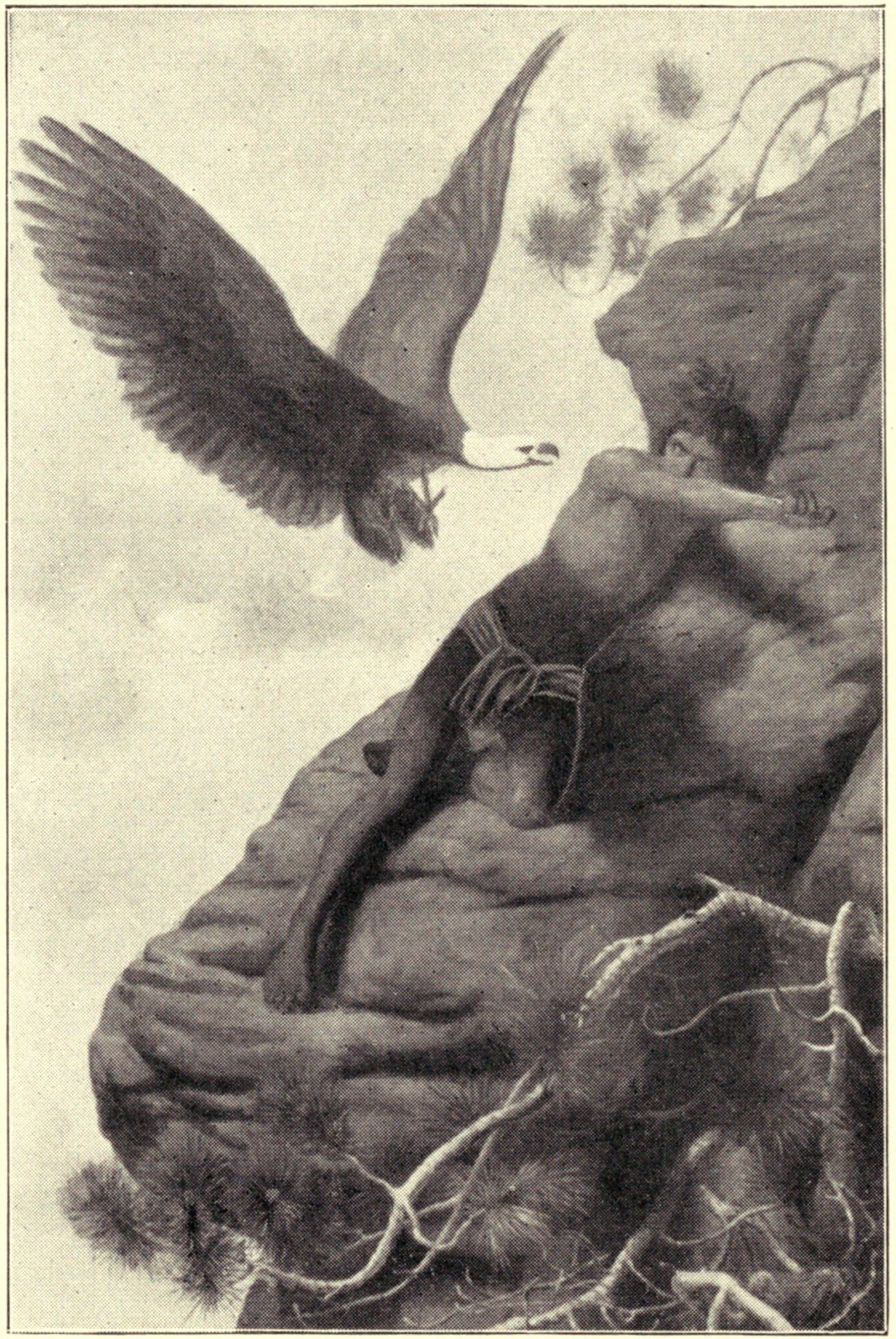
1900 engraving after tableau Young Brave's Excelsior (1885).

== Bibliography ==
- Stephen B. Barnwell, The Story of an American Family, Marquette, 1969, 435 p. (via Internet Archive).
- Porter Butts, Art in Wisconsin. The Art Experience of the Middle West Frontier, Madison, 1936, p. 115-119.
- Michael Trinkley and Debi Hacker, Roupelmond: An Eighteenth and Nineteenth Century Interior St. Helena Parish Plantation, Beaufort County, South Carolina, Research Series 53, Chicora Foundation, Columbia (South Carolina), Dec 1999, 216 p. (via chicora.og).
- Saddle & Sirloin Club Portrait Collection Guidebook, Kentucky State Fair Board, Louisville (Kentucky), 2020, p. 23 (via North American International Livestock Exposition).
- James R. Stuart, Autobiography, Madison, 1907 (manuscript published by: Trinkley and Hacker, op. cit., p. 201-213).
