= Paul E. Harney =

American painter

Paul E. Harney Jr.
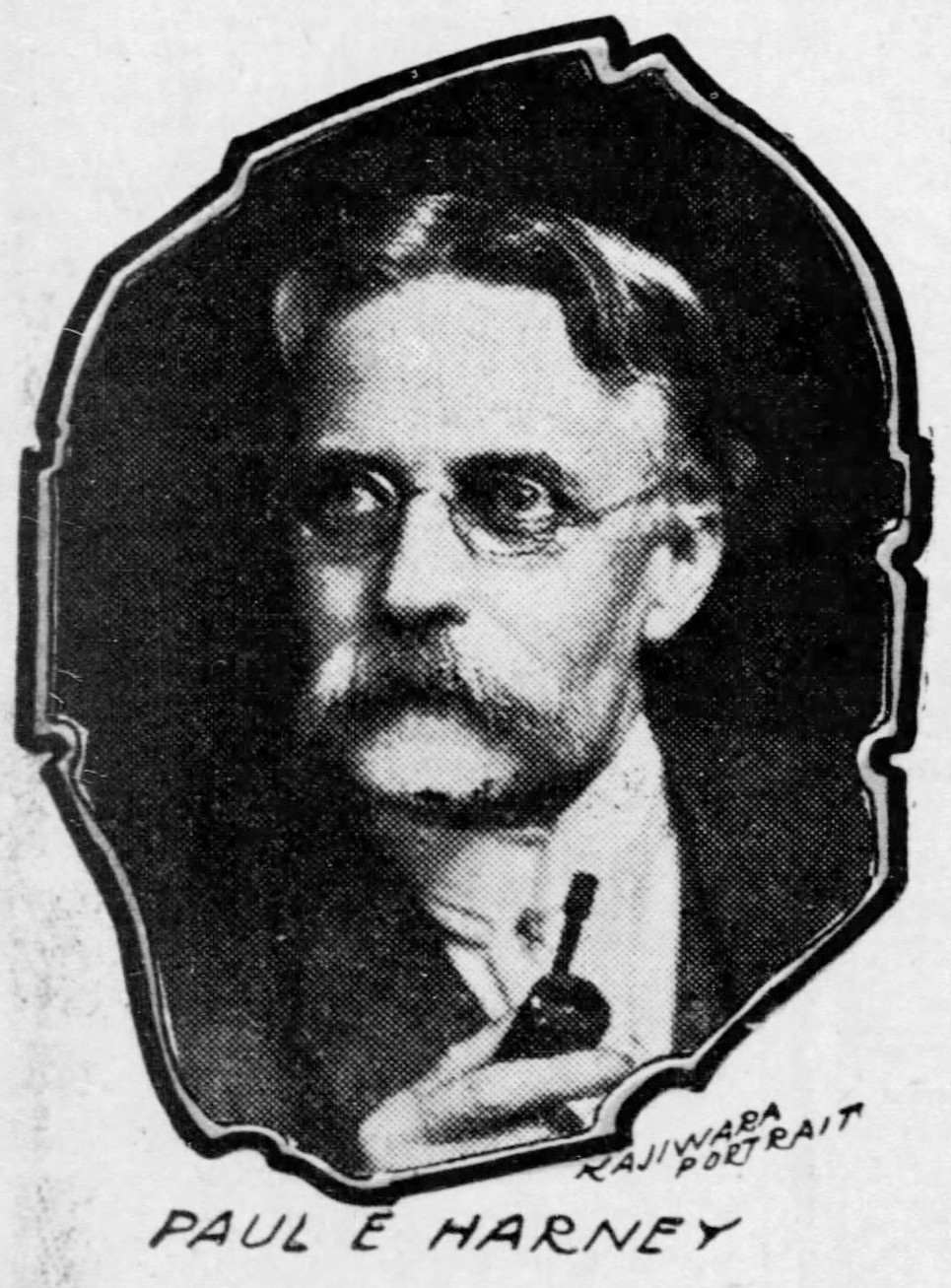
- Photograph of Paul E. Harney Jr., 1911, by Takuma Kajiwara
- Born: October 21, 1850; New Orleans, Louisiana, U.S.
- Died: November 27, 1915 (aged 65); Lemay (St. Louis), Missouri, U.S.
- Awards: Silver Medal, Portland Exposition, 1906.

Paul E. Harney (October 21, 1850 – November 27, 1915) was an American artist and college professor.

== Early life ==
Paul Edward Harney Jr. was born on October 21, 1850, in New Orleans, the son of Paul and Susan Ferris Harney. The family moved to St. Louis when he was very young. Harney was an early student of artist Alban Jasper Conant, a painter of Abraham Lincoln, and also of James Reeve Stuart, an itinerant Southern aristocratic portrait artist. He also studied art at the National Academy of Design in New York City, 1871-1872, and 1874-1876 at the Royal Bavarian Academy of Fine Arts, Munich in Munich, under Barth and Lindenschmit.

== Art instructor ==
Harney settled in Alton, Illinois and taught as a member of the faculty at Shurtleff College After twenty years as both faculty and as Shurtleff's Director of Art, he moved to the Missouri side of the Mississippi River along with his wife Emma Stewart and his three children (his son Eliot had died while still in Alton). For several years Harney occupied a chair in the St. Louis School of Fine Arts at Washington University in St. Louis. He was a founding member of the St. Louis Artists' Guild and a member of the Society of Western Arts.

== Description of Harney as an artist ==
As an academy-trained artist, Harney's work shows the influence of both the National Academy of Design and the Royal Bavarian Academy of Fine Arts. Particularly in the genre of portrait painting, (for which Harney was popular and adept), the dark, muted, earthy palette of the Munich School is evident.

Harney's obituary published in the St. Louis Post-Dispatch recorded that he "specialized in sketches of poultry, and also became known for his canvases of monks and fireside scenes," Further, "many of his paintings hang in St. Louis homes." In 1915, the Alton Evening Telegraph reported that "wherever he was he was always welcome. He was filled with wit and humor, and he was a story teller of talent. He had artistic sense that was strong in many lines other than painting."

== Assisting his old Master ==
At the turn of the century Harney was called to New York to do some work on some paintings that were executed by Alban Jasper Conant. Nearly blind, his hand was no longer possessed of the cunning it once had. Harney was called to finish the paintings and Conant's name was put on them Harney was a member of the Masonic order and a Knight Templar. Harney was survived by his sister, Mary Walker, and his granddaughter.

== Hardships and death ==
Several unfortunate tragedies beset Harney's later years. All three of his remaining children died between 1906 and 1907 (Howard, Estelle Harney Hauskins, and Paul,) along with his wife, who died in 1910. According to the Alton Evening Telegraph, November 27, 1915, Harney died poverty stricken of tuberculosis on November 27, 1915, at the age of 66. The St. Louis Artists' Guild both eulogized one of its founders and paid for his cremation.

== Gallery ==
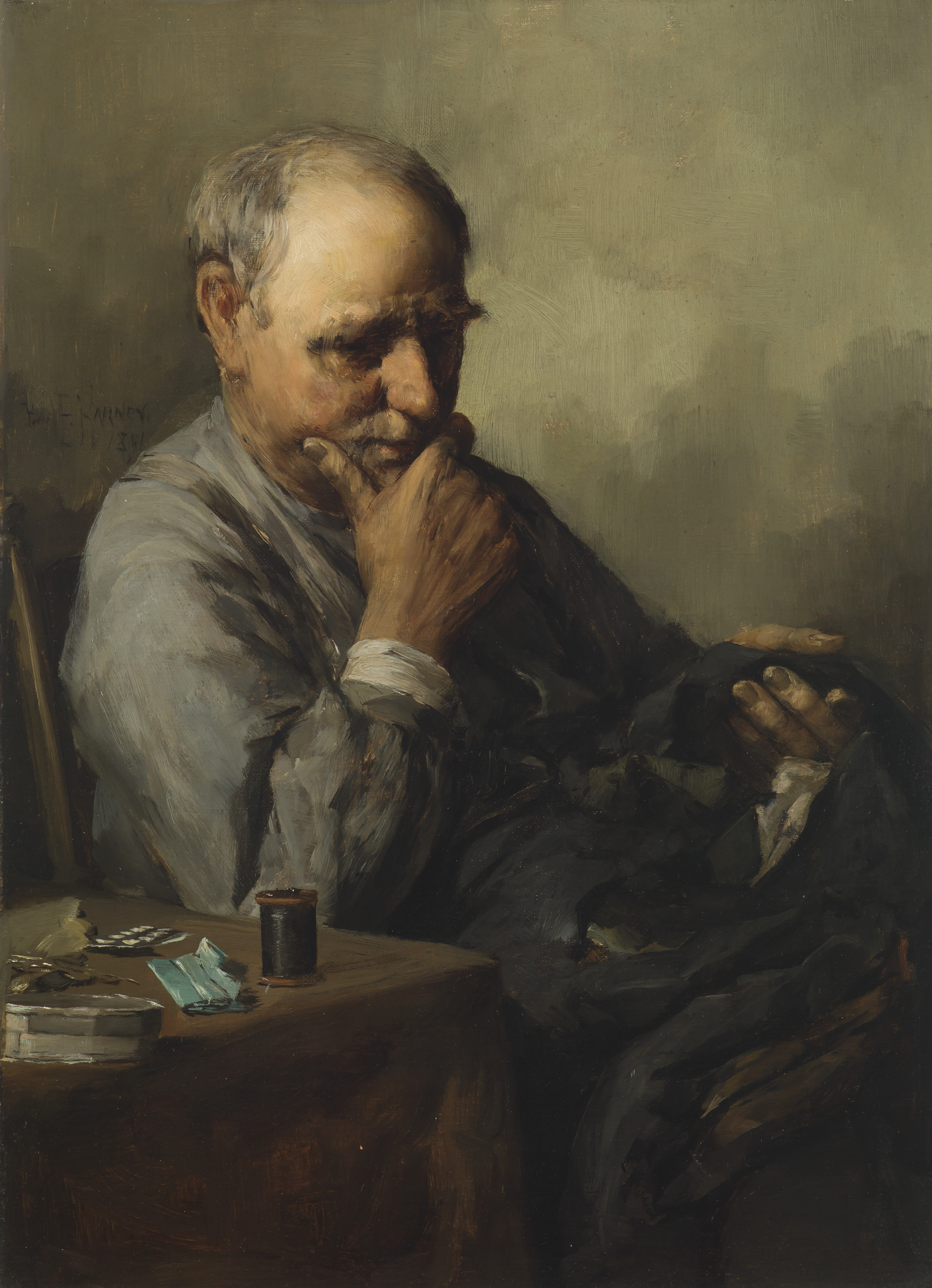
Beyond Redemption, Oil on Canvas, 1891, St. Louis Museum of Art

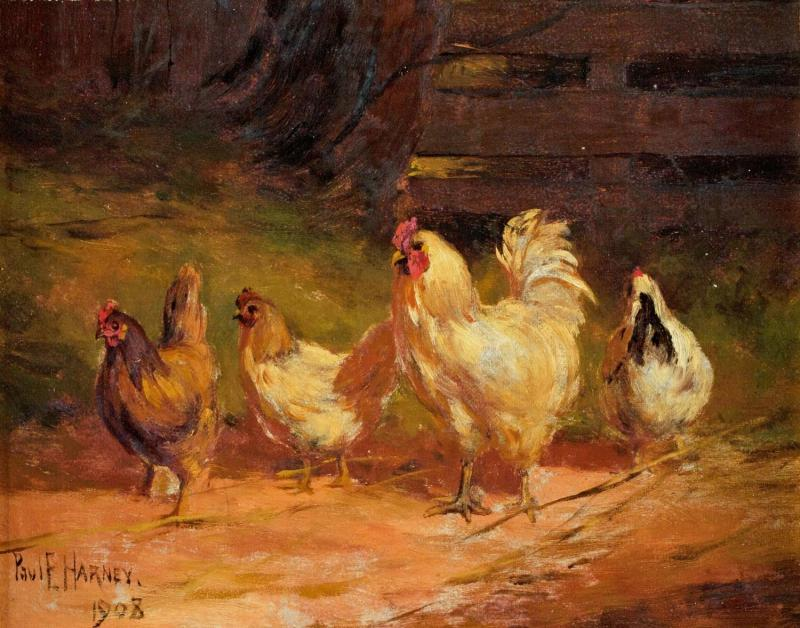
Chickens, Oil on Canvas, 1908, New Britain Museum of American Art

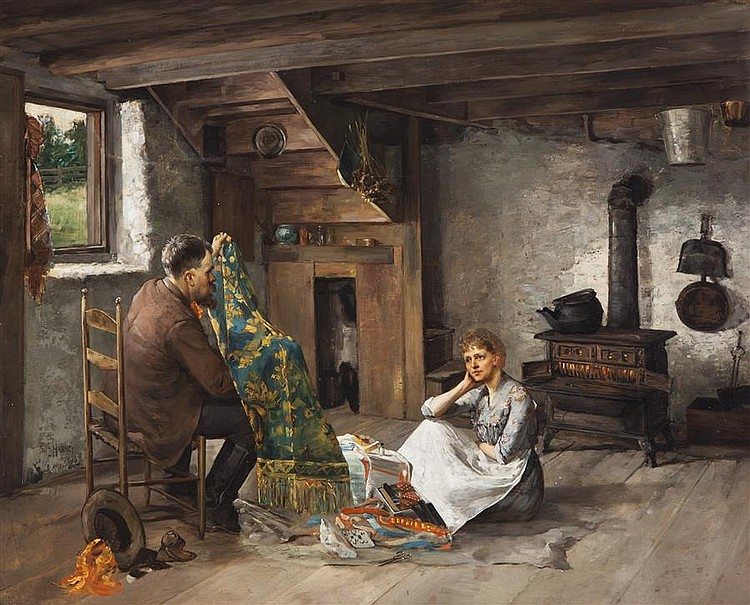
Interior of Harney's home - wife sitting on floor, 1890.

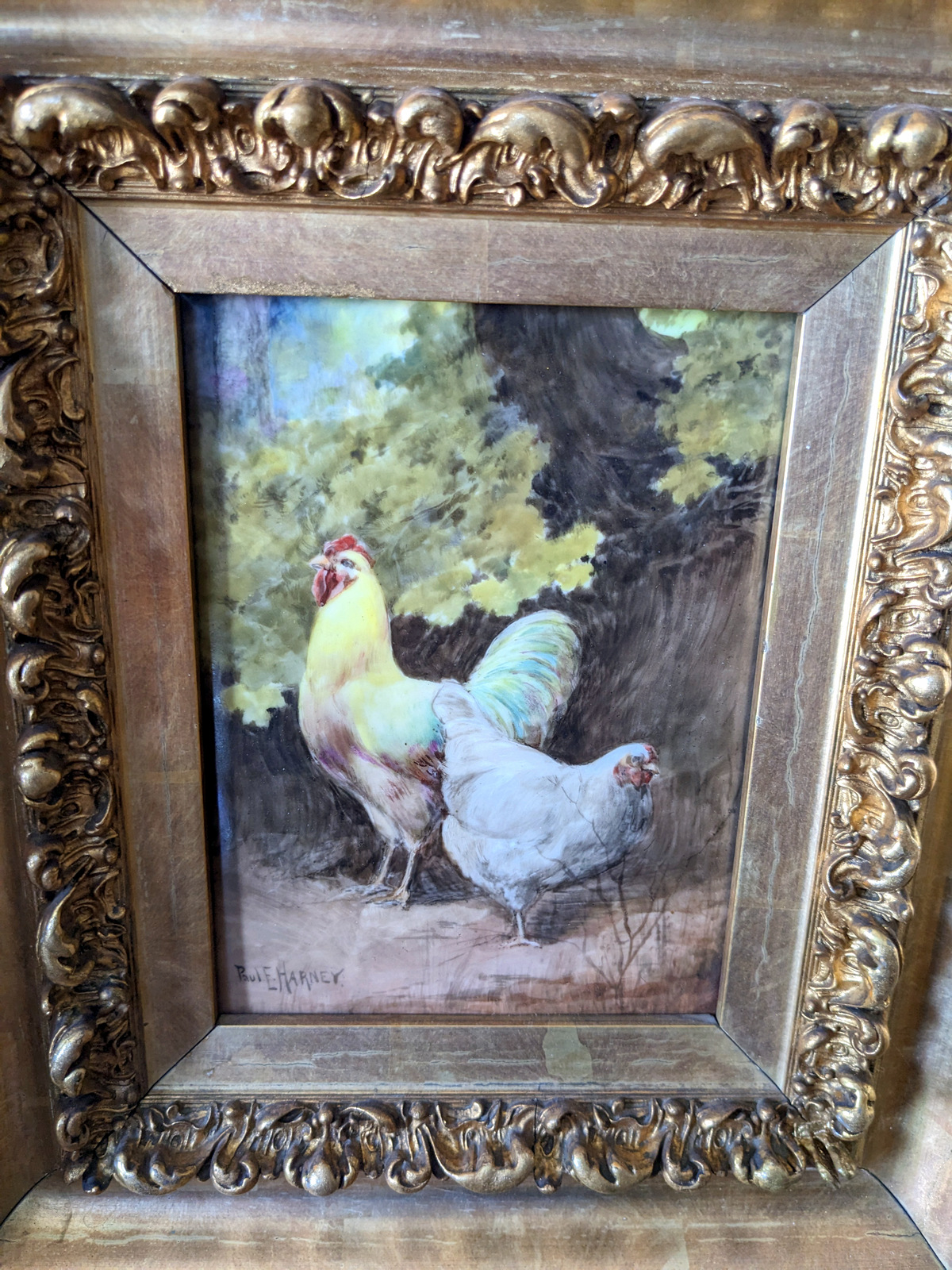
White Chickens on Porcelain, not dated.

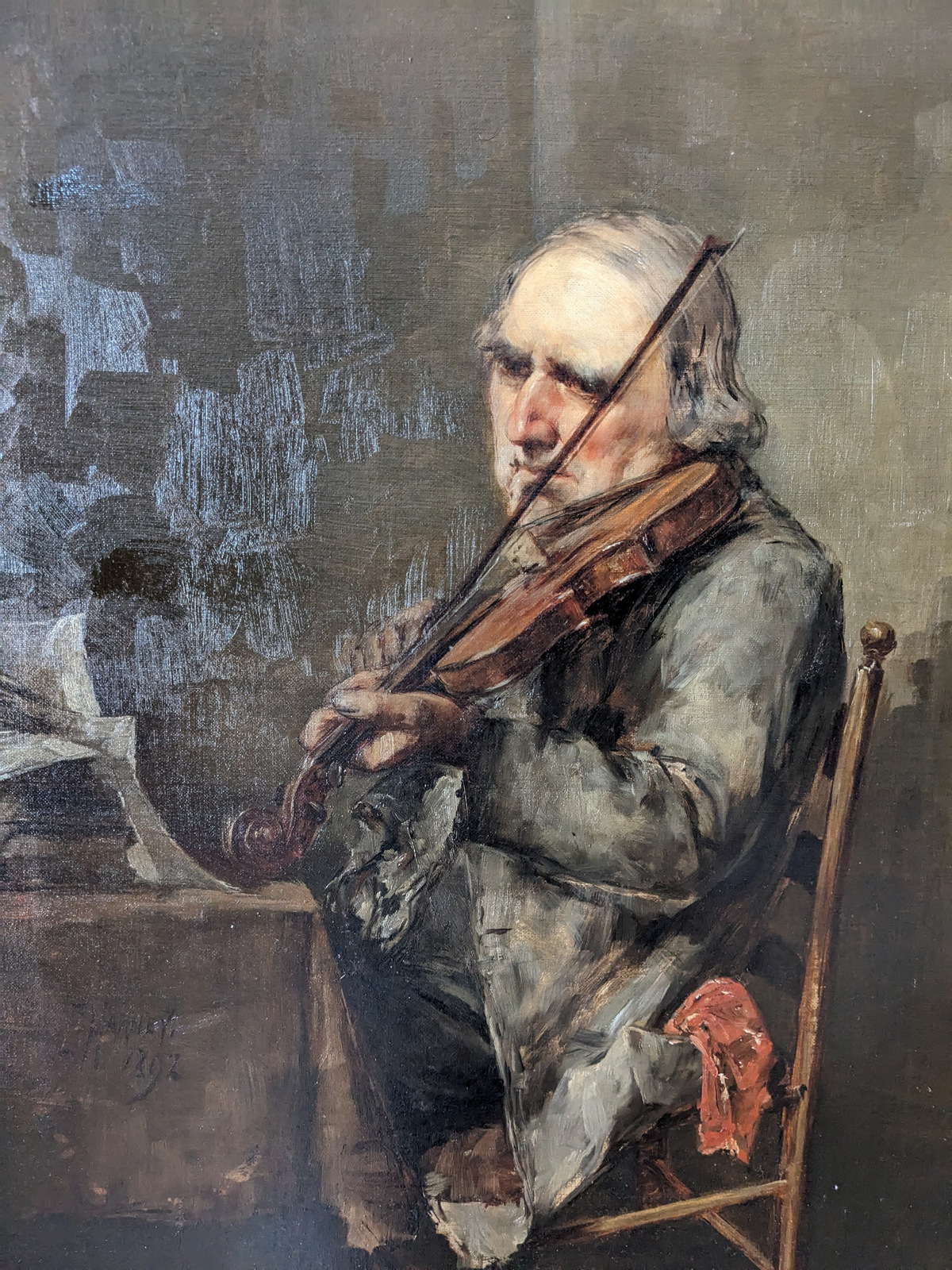
Violinist, 1892.

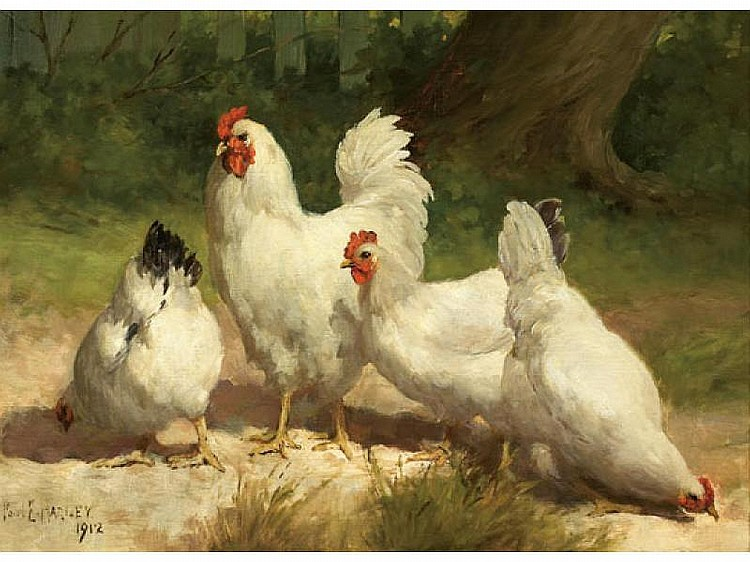
White Chickens, typical Harney painting, 1912.

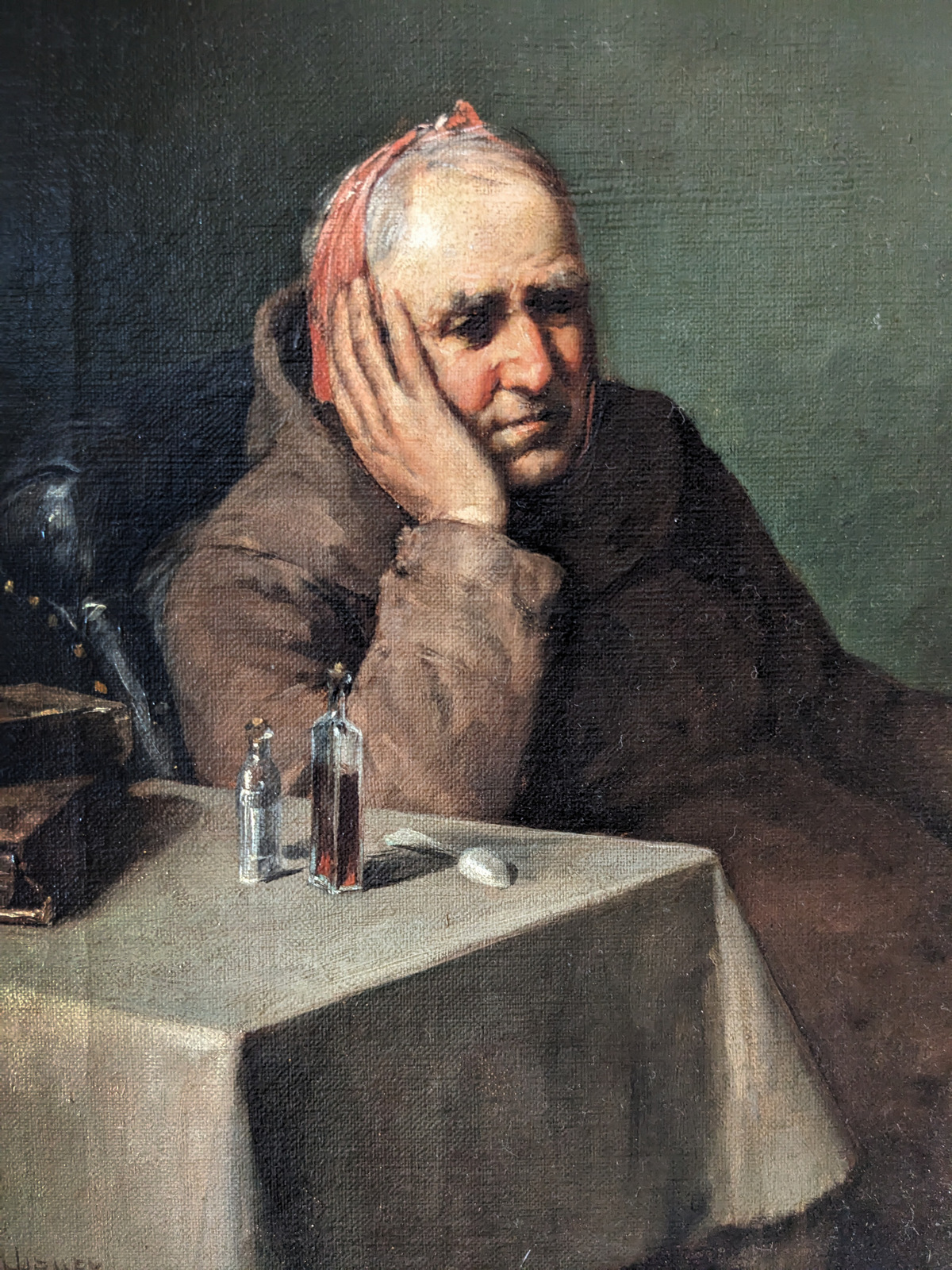
Man suffering from toothache, 1896.

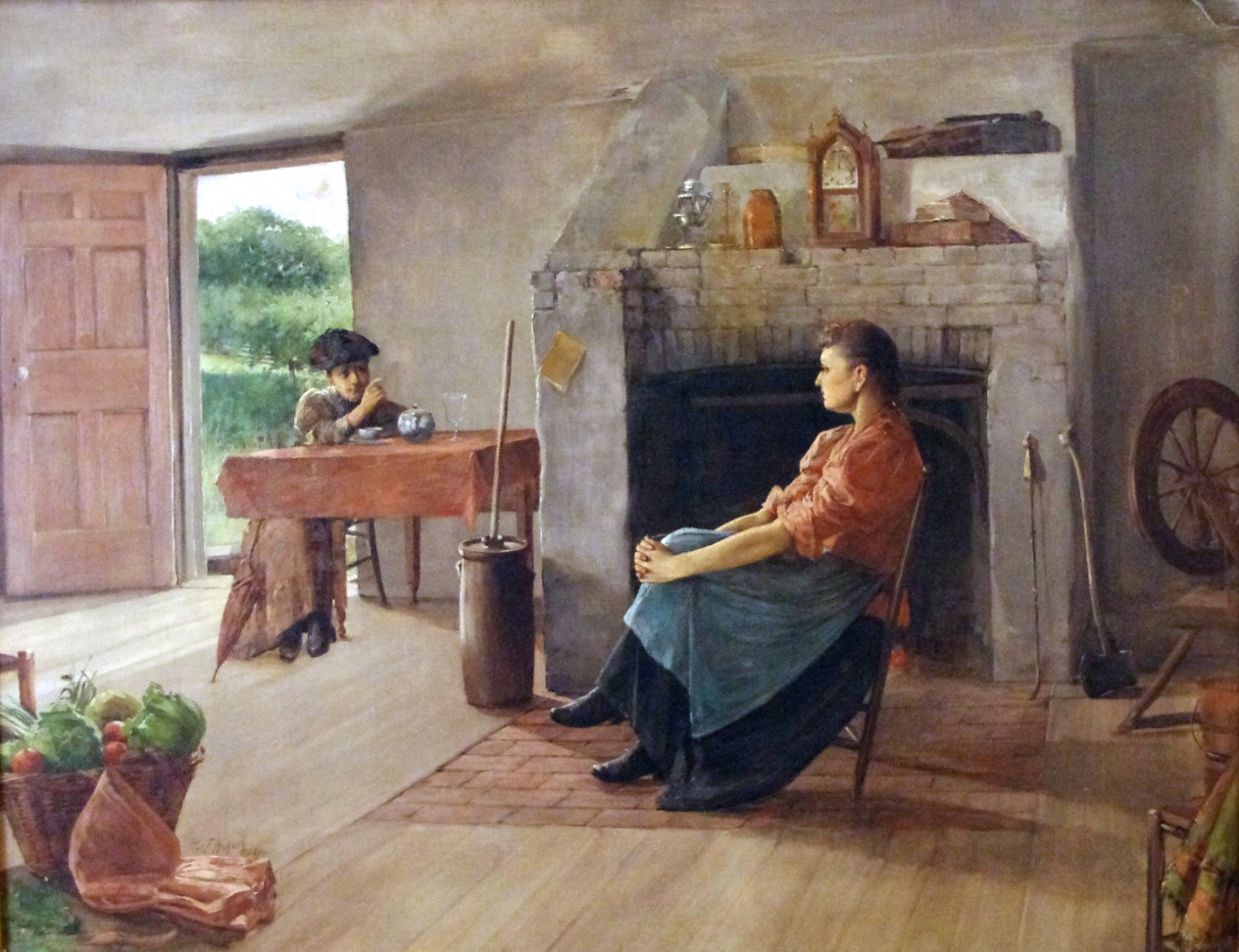
The Gossipers, circa 1894.

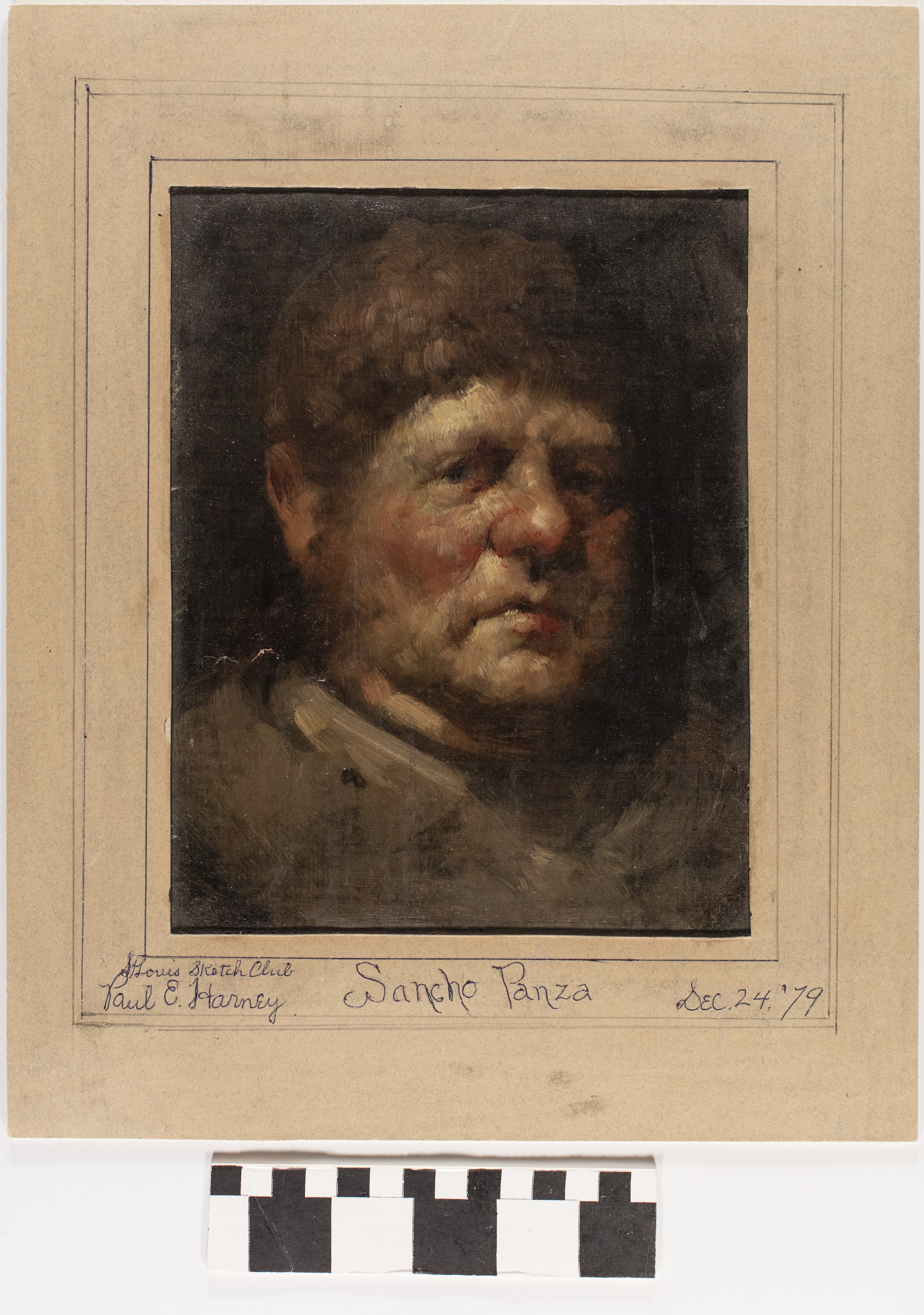
Portrait of Sancho Panza, 1879.
