= Attorney General Conant =

Attorney General Conant may refer to:

- Gordon Daniel Conant (1885–1953), Attorney General of Ontario
- Sherman Conant (1839–1890), Attorney General of Florida
