= Halle Steensland House =

Historic house in Wisconsin, United States

- U.S. National Register of Historic Places
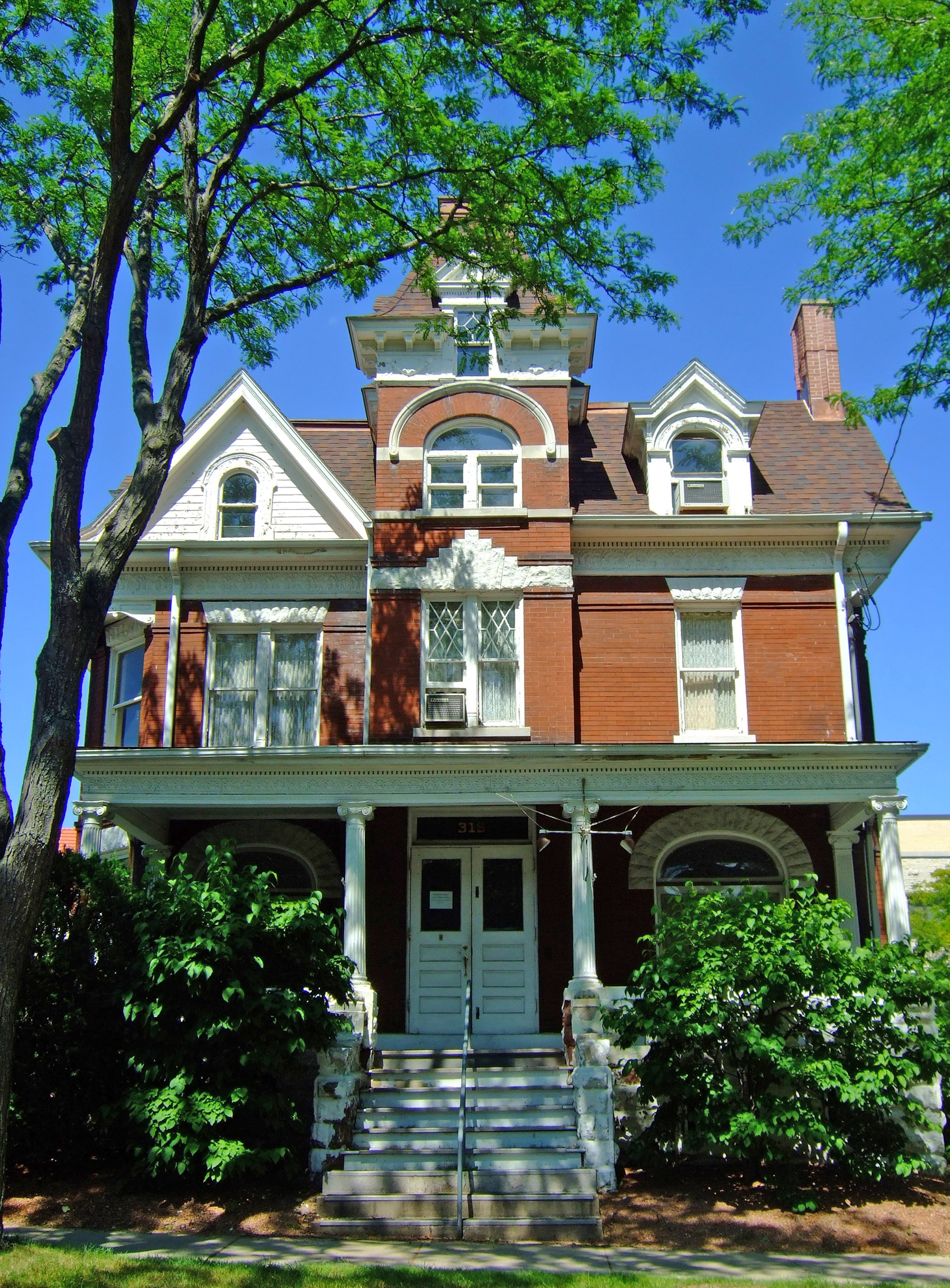
- Halle Steensland house at 315 N. Carroll, July 2009

- Location within Wisconsin Location within the United States
- Location: 15 West Gorham Street; Madison, Wisconsin; United States
- Coordinates: 43.0770°N 89.3883°W
- Area: .123 acres (0.050 ha)
- Built: 1896
- Architect: Gordon & Paunack
- Architectural style: Queen Anne
- NRHP reference No.: 82001843
- Added to NRHP: November 30, 1982

The Halle Steensland House (also known as the Bethel Parish Shoppe) is a historic home of prominent Norwegian-American Halle Steensland, located three blocks north of the Capitol square in Madison, Wisconsin, United States. It was added to the National Register of Historic Places on November 30, 1982, significant for its association with Steensland and significant as one of the finest brick Queen Anne houses in Madison.

== Context ==
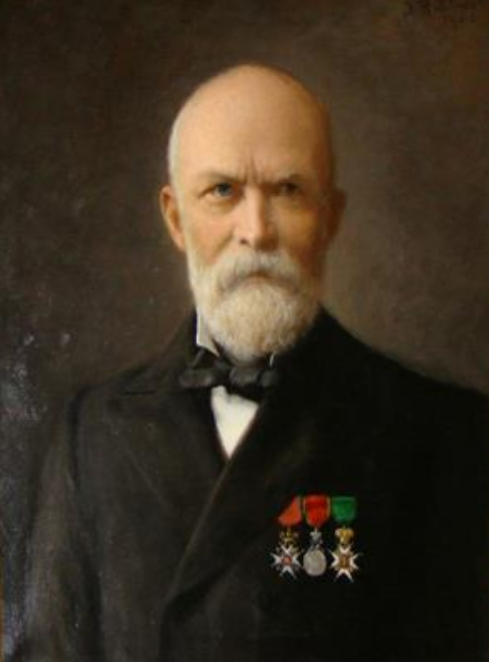
Portrait of Halle Steensland (1906) by James R. Stuart.

Halle Steensland was born on a farm in Norway in 1832 and immigrated to Wisconsin in 1854. After a year clerking in a store in Rock County, he moved to Madison to study English and German, while continuing clerking. In 1857 he married Sophia Halvorsdatter and in 1859 he started a grocery business. Around 1860 the family moved to a rural farm in what is now Maple Bluff.

By 1871 the immigrant family was prospering. Steensland sold his grocery business and helped organize the Hekla Fire Insurance Company. He became secretary and manager of that company, and later president. He travelled widely and wrote for the Norwegian press. In 1890 Steensland established the Savings and Loan Trust Company, where he served as president and treasurer. In 1892 Steensland was appointed as vice-consul for Sweden and Norway. That same year the family moved back into Madison, building a house on Langdon Street. Only four years later, he built the current house at 315 North Carroll to be closer to the Capitol.

== Design and Steensland occupancy ==
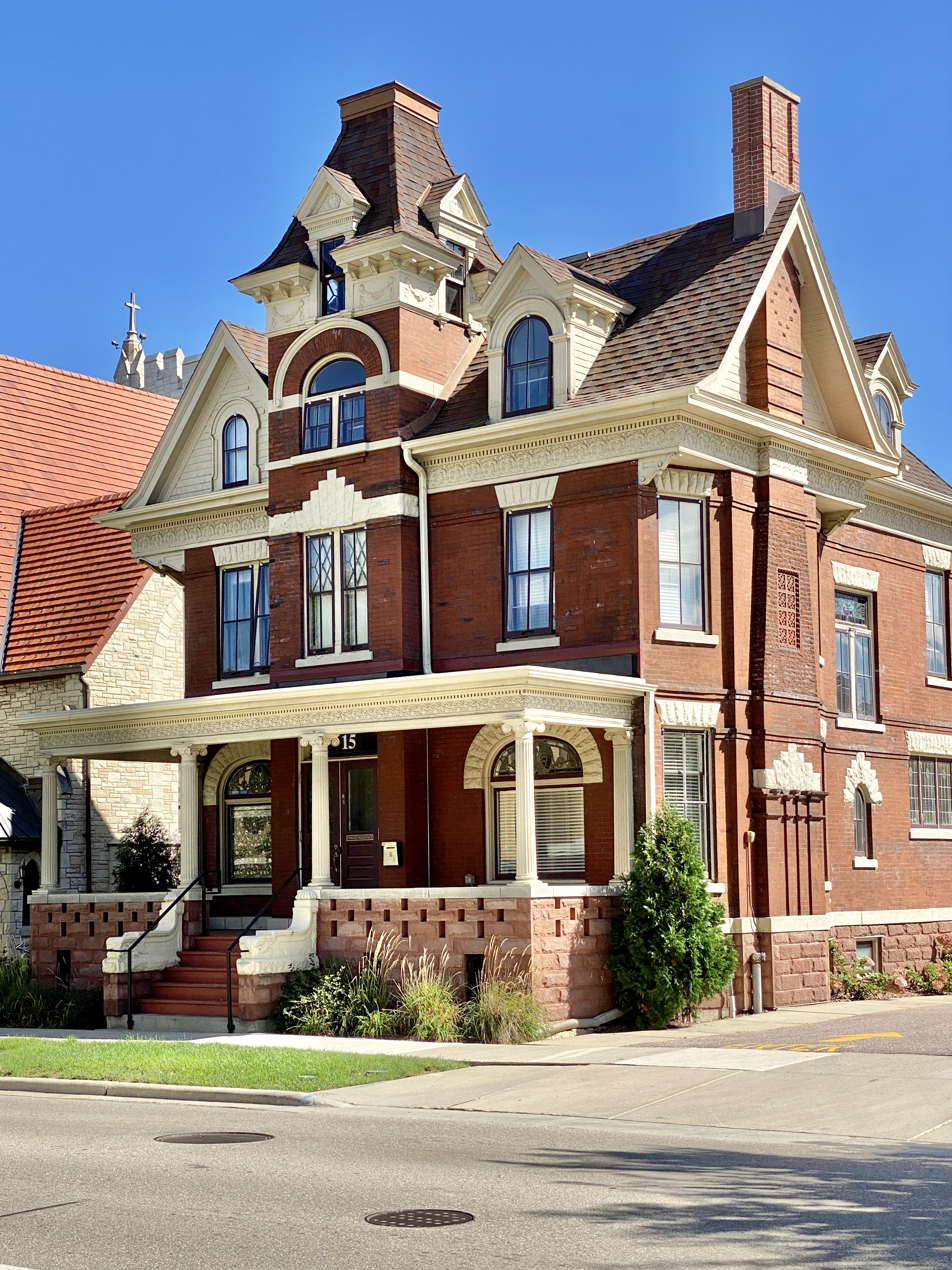
2022, on West Gorham Street

The Steenslands hired the local architectural firm J.O. Gordon and F.W. Paunack to design a grand three-story wood-framed structure, clad in red brick veneer and stone trim, and styled eclectically. Queen Anne style dominates, manifested in the asymmetric front, the complex roof, the varied surface textures, the stained glass windows, and the prominent chimney. But the fluted Ionic columns and pilasters of the front porch and the entablatures draw from Neoclassical style. The round-arched windows suggest Romanesque Revival, and the witch's cap on the central tower suggests Second Empire style.

Inside the front door, a vestibule leads through an inner door with leaded glass windows to a central hallway. Off the hallway are a large parlor with a corner green-tiled fireplace, a small library with a Neoclassical-styled fireplace, a dining room, and a kitchen and pantry in the rear. The walls are papered, then painted white. The wainscoting and stair rails remain varnished wood. A stairway leads to the second floor, which contains six bedrooms, a small sitting room, and a bathroom. On the third floor are three servants' rooms and a large room which was used for games and music.

Steensland was a philanthropist in his later years. He supported Bethel Lutheran Church and donated to build a library at St. Olaf College. He was a directory of the Madison Park and Pleasure Drive Association and in 1904 he donated $10,000 toward the Steensland Bridge over the Yahara River on East Washington. Steensland continued as vice-consul to Sweden and leader of his Savings Loan and Trust Company until he died in 1910.

== Later years ==
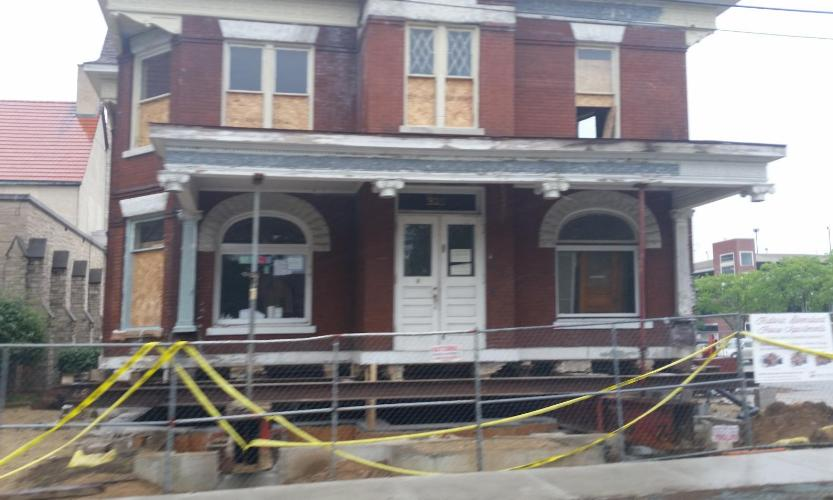
Halle Steensland house after April 2015 move

After Halle died, his son lived in the house on North Carroll. The family sold the house in 1938, after which it housed offices for 20 years. The house has been owned by the Bethel Lutheran Church since 1958, when it became the Bethel Parish Shoppe. In 2015, Bethel moved the house from its location facing North Carroll Street approximately 200 feet to a location in the same block but facing West Gorham Street. As such, its current address is 15 West Gorham Street. The church is planning to renovate the house for use as student housing.

The house is of historical importance. In 1974 it was designated a landmark by the Madison Landmarks Commission. In 1982 it was placed on the National Register of Historic Places. It is considered "one of the finest brick Queen Anne houses in Madison" and "one of the best representatives of Victorian architecture in Madison," being little changed from the time it was built. It was also designed by the a local architect firm, and built for Steensland, a prominent citizen.

== See also ==
- National Register of Historic Places listings in Madison, Wisconsin
