= Carlyn Halde =

American medical mycologist

- Born: June 16, 1924; Glendale, California
- Died: June 11, 2014 (aged 89); San Francisco, California
- Education: UCLA (BA, MA); Duke University (PhD)
- Awards: Fulbright Scholarship
- Scientific career
- Fields: Medical mycology
- Workplaces: University of Hawaii; Tripler Naval Hospital; University of the Philippines; University of Santo Tomas; Stanford University; UCLA; University of Indonesia; University of California, San Francisco
- Thesis: The relation of nutrition to the growth and morphology of trichophyton concentricum blanchard 1896 (1953)
- Doctoral advisor: Norman Conant

Carlyn Jean Halde (16 June 1924 – 11 June 2014) was an American medical mycologist. Halde was instrumental in making medical mycology a widespread field of research, lecturing around the world and setting up laboratory facilities to examine and culture fungal samples. She was also known as a mentor, educator and philanthropist.

== Early life and education ==
Halde was born in Glendale, California into an artistic family. They settled in Los Angeles when Halde was starting fourth grade. She developed rheumatic fever and read books about nature during her convalescence. She attended Alhambra High School.

Inspired by her high school biology teacher, Halde majored in zoology at UCLA starting in 1941. After getting a job in Dr. Odra Plunkett's lab as an undergraduate student, she decided to stay at UCLA for her master's, supervised by Plunkett. Her thesis, completed in 1947, was entitled The production of antibiotic substances by some green plants.

== Career and research ==
Halde initially set out to become a high school teacher in 1947 and worked at San Fernando High School. However, it was not the experience she had hoped for, students were difficult to engage and she had few resources at her disposal. By the end of the year, she received an invitation to lecture in Hawaii which she accepted.

Halde was appointed visiting professor at the University of Hawaii in 1948. She lectured on medical microbiology, focusing on mycology. The course was seen as innovative and relevant as mycotic infections were common in the area and few universities offered such specialised instruction. Between 1948 and 1950, she began working on clinical mycology at the Tripler Naval Hospital though she continued lecturing at the university. During her time in Hawaii, Halde went on hiking and camping trips, including an expedition sponsored by the university to collect botanical samples.

Looking to become a professional medical mycologist, Halde applied and was accepted in the Ph.D. program at Duke University supervised by Dr. Norman Conant. She was to begin her studies in the fall of 1950. In the summer of 1950, Halde was forced to cancel her regular medical mycology lecture series in Hawaii after receiving news that she had been awarded a Fulbright Scholarship. She and Dr. Conant agreed that she should accept the offer, delaying the start of her doctoral work by a year. From June 1950 to April 1951, she worked in Manila in the Philippines on medical mycology. She took collected and cultured samples from fungal infection cases at the University of the Philippines Institute of Hygiene and University of Santo Tomas Medical School. At the end of her Fulbright tenure, she embarked on a tour of Southeast Asia with meetings coordinated by the World Health Organization.

Returning to the United States in 1951, Halde worked on her Ph.D. at Duke until 1953 with a thesis entitled The relation of nutrition to the growth and morphology of trichophyton concentricum blanchard 1896. She was eager to return to California, and sought employment there. In 1953, Stanford established a clinical mycology lab and Halde was appointed director. Two years later, she moved to the Dermatology Research Laboratory at UCLA where she remained until 1958. She studied amphotericin B as a treatment for coccidioidomycosis, an infection caused by an environmental fungal pathogen. Between 1958 and 1961, Halde was at the University of Indonesia Medical School supervising and setting up a mycology lab. Afterwards, taking a break from her research, she spent time travelling in Africa with her parents.

In 1964, Halde accepted a position at UCSF as a professor of mycology and remained there for the rest of her career. She "retired" from UCSF at 65 to leave openings in the department for new faculty, but continued to teach and mentor students. The main focus of her research was medical mycology and she published many resources for clinicians in medicine, dentistry and pharmacology. In 1971, she introduced a medical mycology workshop series at UCSF as a continuing education program for medical and laboratory personnel.

Halde was a member and supporter of professional and honour societies including the Lambda Sigma Society, the American Society for Microbiology, the Medical Mycological Society of the Americas, the Mycological Society of America (joined 1954), the International Society for Human and Animal Mycology and the Society of Women Geographers.

== Awards and honours ==
- 1950 Fulbright Scholarship.
- Strobel Research Fund to study tuberculosis.
- In 1972 and 1974, Halde was nominated for the Chancellor's Award for Public Service at UCSF in recognition of her academic and volunteer achievements.

== Advocacy and legacy ==
Halde was a generous donor and volunteer during her lifetime:

- 2005 donation to the Jepson Herbarium in memory of Dr. Elizabeth McClintock.
- Donations to Nature in the City, an organisation working to restore nature in San Francisco.
- Halde worked with PCI as a volunteer in Tijuana, Mexico and on the volunteer committee in the San Francisco Bay Area. She recruited student volunteers to assist in clinics. She also helped to organise Walk for Mankind events.
- San Francisco Library Citizens Advisory Committee.
- Member of Board of Directors of the San Francisco Tuberculosis and Health Association, later Breathe California. Halde first became acquainted with the organisation when looking for material for her students at USCF.
- Member of Board of Directors of the John McLaren Society.
- Natural Science Section of the San Francisco Chapter of the Sierra Club.
- Member of UCSF School of Pharmacy Heritage Circle.

She established funds for members of her field, including the following:

- The Carlyn Halde Latin American Student Travel Award, administered through the American Society for Microbiology and Medical Mycological Society of the Americas is awarded to defray travel and conference expenses.
- The Carlyn Halde Fund, to fund membership to the International Society for Human and Animal Mycology.
- The Carlyn Halde Mycology Education Fund and Carlyn Halde Student Fund in support of the Northern California Branch American Society for Microbiology.

Other donations from her estate:

- 2017 donation to CARE placing her in the Founder’s Council Murray Lincoln Society.
- Legacy donor to the ACLU Northern California. Halde's observation of segregation and sexism during her Ph.D. in North Carolina made her a supporter of organisations aiming to end discrimination.
- 2016 bequest to UCSF.
- 2016 bequest to UCLA.
- 2015 donation to PCI.

== Personal life ==
Halde experienced some health issues including epilepsy.

== Selected publications ==
- Halde C, Newcomer VD, Wright ET, Sternberg TH. 1957. An evaluation of amphotericin B in vitro and in vivo in mice against Coccidioides immitis and Candida albicans, and preliminary observations concerning the administration of amphotericin B to man. J Invest Dermatol 28:217–231.
- Halde, C.; Fraher, M. A. (1966-03-01). "Cryptococcus neoformans in pigeon feces in San Francisco". California Medicine. 104 (3): 188–190. ISSN 0008-1264. PMC 1516251. PMID 5936987.
- Mcginnis MR, Rinaldi MG, Halde C, Hilger AE. 1975. Mycotic flora of the interdigital spaces of the human foot: a preliminary investigation. Mycopathologia 55: 47–52.
- Waldorf AR, Halde C, Vedros NA. (1982). Murine model of pulmonary mucormycosis in cortisone-treated mice. Sabouraudia 20:217–224.
- Halde C. (1987). Basic Mycology for the Clinician. Thieme Medical Publishers, Inc, New York, NY. DOI: 10.1055/s-2007-1012694
- Halde C., Valesco M., Flores M. (1992) The Need for a Mycoses Reporting System. In: Borgers M., Hay R., Rinaldi M.G. (eds) Current Topics in Medical Mycology. Current Topics in Medical Mycology, vol 4. Springer, New York, NY. doi:10.1007/978-1-4612-2762-5_11
