= Sherman Conant =

American politician

Member of the Florida House of Representatives from the Duval district
- In office 1881

United States Marshal for the Northern District of Florida
- In office 1871–1879
- Appointed by: Ulysses S. Grant

9th Florida Attorney General
- In office 1870–1871
- Governor: Harrison Reed
- Preceded by: A. R. Meek
- Succeeded by: J. B. C. Drew

Judge of the Leon County Court
- In office June 1868 – February 1869
- Appointed by: Harrison Reed

Personal details
- Born: December 21, 1839 Dublin, New Hampshire, U.S.
- Died: November 21, 1890 (aged 50) Palatka, Florida, U.S.
- Party: Republican
- Spouse: Frances Dewey (m. 1867)
- Children: 2

Military service
- Allegiance: United States of America
- Branch/service: United States Army
- Years of service: 1862–1865
- Rank: Major
- Unit: 39th Massachusetts Volunteer Infantry
- Commands: 3rd United States Colored Infantry Regiment
- Battles/wars: American Civil War: Second Battle of Fort Wagner

Sherman Conant (December 21, 1839 – November 21, 1890) was an American soldier and politician who served as the 9th Florida Attorney General during Reconstruction.

== Early life and military service ==
Conant was born on December 21, 1839, in Dublin, New Hampshire, from a batch of triplets. He is a member of the Conant family. Conant moved to Littleton, Massachusetts, in 1845.

At the beginning of the American Civil War, Conant was a student in Natick, Massachusetts. On August 4, 1862, he enlisted as a corporal into Company I of the 39th Massachusetts, tasked with the defense of Washington, D.C.

In August 1863, army recruiter George Luther Stearns organized and mustered the 3rd Colored Infantry in Philadelphia, Pennsylvania. Conant was promoted to the rank of captain and was placed in command of Company H. The 3rd Colored fought at the Second Battle of Fort Wagner, capturing the fort shortly after the famous assault by the 54th Massachusetts. In 1864, the regiment assisted in the capture of Jacksonville, Florida, and occupied much of coastal Florida. After the end of the war, the 3rd Colored was assigned to assist the Department of Florida in reorganizing the state.

On September 13, 1865, Conant was promoted to the rank of major. The regiment was disbanded a month later, though Conant remained in Florida to aid in its reorganization.

== Political career ==
After leaving the army, Conant, a Republican, settled in Jacksonville, becoming a prominent citizen popular with local African-Americans due to his command of the 3rd Colored during the war. Conant was selected to be the secretary of the state's Constitutional Convention in 1868 in Tallahassee, Florida, drafting the Reconstruction era so-called Constitution of Florida, derided as the "Carpetbagger" Constitution by opponents. While in Tallahassee, Conant served on the Leon County Voter Registration Board, and he is credited with helping enfranchise hundred of African-Americans in the area.

The following month, Conant, who had been serving as a United States Commissioner for the Northern District of Florida, was appointed as the judge for the Leon County by Florida Governor Harrison Reed. He served until his resignation in 1869. In 1870, Conant was appointed as the 9th Florida Attorney General by Reed.

He would only serve as the state's attorney general until 1871, when President Ulysses S. Grant appointed Conant as the United States Marshal for the Northern District of Florida. Conant received national attention for his 1871 arrest of four members of the Ku Klux Klan accused of several lynchings during the Jackson County War. Conant was reappointed by Grant at the end of his first term in 1875, and served until the end of his second term in 1879.

In 1881, Conant represented Duval County in the Florida House of Representatives. He would only serve for that year due to the death of his daughter.

== Personal life and death ==
In 1867, Conant married Frances Dewey, a native of Boston, Massachusetts. They had two children: Anne Whitney (1867 – 1881) and John Sherman (1877 – 1890), with Conant outliving both of them.

Conant died at his home in Palatka, Florida, on November 21, 1890. Conant served as the general manager of the Florida Southern Railroad from January 1883 until his death.

== Legacy ==
In 1884, while he was serving as manager of the Florida Southern Railroad, the town of Conant, Florida, in Lake County was established by a group of wealthy Englishmen and named for Conant, a major financier of the railroad. The town grew into a vacation destination for the wealthy, until the Greet Freeze in 1894 and 1895 forced the town to be abandoned. Much of the land where the town was is now incorporated in Lady Lake, Florida.
