= Conant, Florida =

- Ghost Town
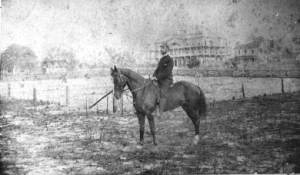
- Conant Florida in 1884, post office and Conant Hotel in the background

- Location within Florida Location within the United States
- Country: United States
- State: Florida
- County: Lake
- Founded: 1884

Conant is a ghost town in Lake County, Florida stretching from the area of Lady Lake, Florida to north of the Marion County, Florida line.

== History ==
It was established in 1884 on what was then the Florida Southern Railroad, and it was named for Sherman Conant. It was a "real estate town" developed by the Hollingshead Firm. During the Great Freeze, crops died and the town experienced wildfires, forcing many members of the community to relocate. By 1919, it was merely a ghost town.

At its height, the town of Conant included a 130-room hotel, general store, women's college, church, and train depot; a steam railroad stopped within a few miles from town.
