= Sir John Conant, 2nd Baronet =

British aristocrat (1923–2024)

Sir John Conant Bt
- Born: John Ernest Michael Conant; 24 April 1923; Lyndon, Rutland, England
- Died: 10 January 2024 (aged 100)
- Spouses: Periwinkle Elizabeth Thorp (m. 1950; died 1985) Mary Clare Atwater (m. 1992)
- Children: 5
- Parent(s): Sir Roger Conant, 1st Baronet; Daphne Learoyd (1888–1976)
- Military career
- Allegiance: United Kingdom
- Branch: British Army
- Service years: 1942–1946
- Rank: Lieutenant
- Unit: Grenadier Guards

Sir John Ernest Michael Conant, 2nd Baronet (24 April 1923 – 10 January 2024) was a British aristocrat.

== Biography ==
The eldest son of the first baronet and a member of the senior branch of the Conant family, he was educated at Eton and Corpus Christi College, Cambridge. During the Second World War, he served with the Grenadier Guards, receiving an emergency commission as a second lieutenant on 4 December 1942, with promotion to war-substantive lieutenant on 6 April 1943. He served as High Sheriff of Rutland in 1960.

Conant died on 10 January 2024, at the age of 100.

Baronetage of the United Kingdom
Preceded by Roger Conant	Baronet (of Lyndon, Rutland); 1973–2024	Succeeded by Sir Simon Conant, 3rd Baronet
