= 39th Massachusetts Infantry Regiment =

39th Massachusetts Volunteer Infantry
- Active: August 13, 1862 – June 1, 1865
- Country: United States of America
- Allegiance: Union
- Branch: Infantry
- Engagements: Bristoe Campaign; Mine Run Campaign; Battle of the Wilderness; Battle of Spotsylvania Court House; Battle of North Anna; Battle of Totopotomoy Creek; Battle of Cold Harbor; Siege of Petersburg; Battle of Globe Tavern; Appomattox Campaign; Battle of Lewis's Farm; Battle of White Oak Road; Battle of Five Forks; Third Battle of Petersburg; Battle of Appomattox Court House

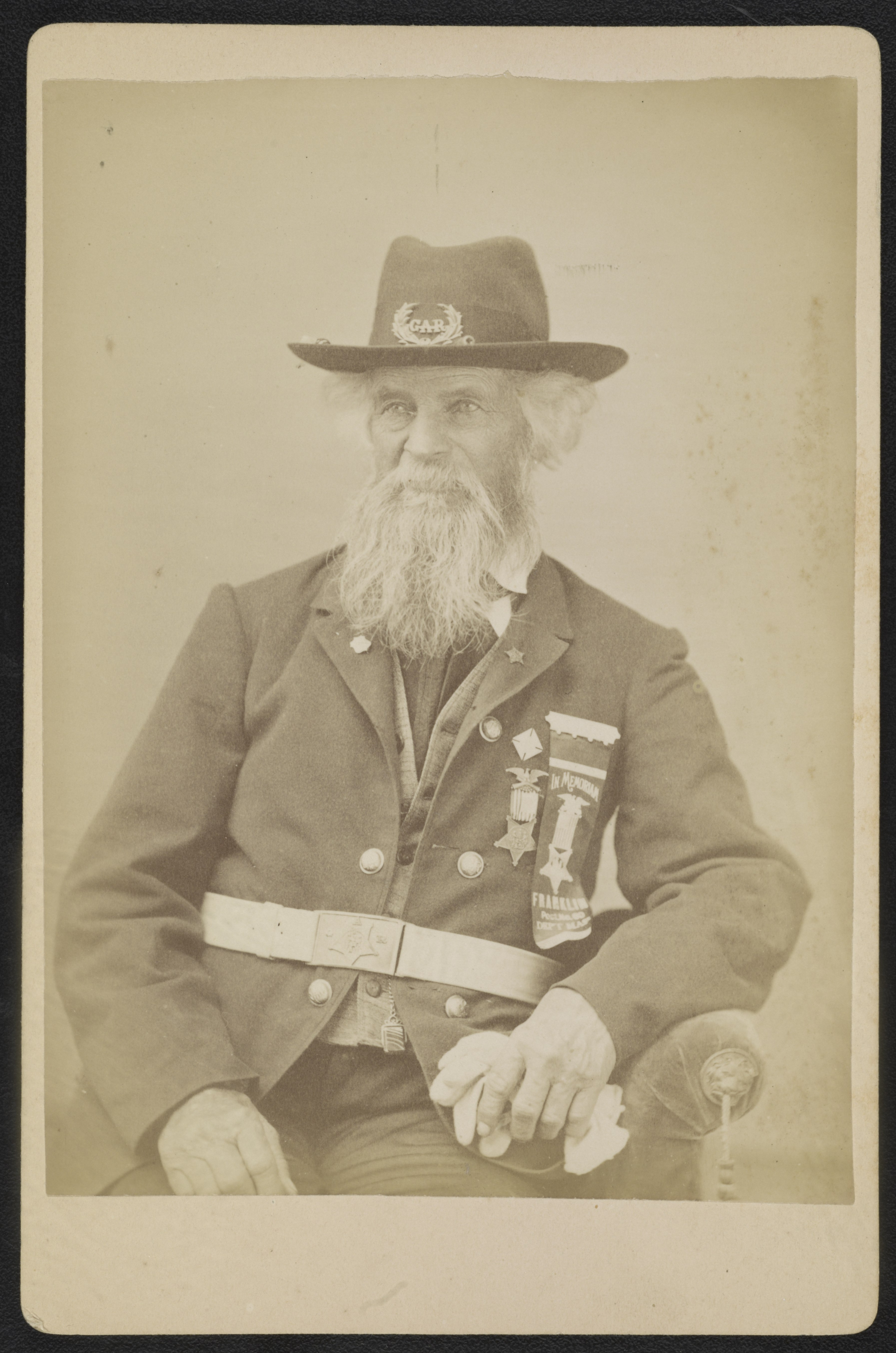
William Field of Co. A, 39th Massachusetts Infantry Regiment in G.A.R. uniform with medals. From the Liljenquist Family Collection of Civil War Photographs, Prints and Photographs Division, Library of Congress

The 39th Massachusetts Volunteer Infantry was an infantry regiment that served in the Union Army during the American Civil War.

== Service ==
The 39th Regiment Massachusetts Infantry was organized at Camp Stanton in Lynnfield, Massachusetts, August 13 through September 2, 1862, and mustered for a three-year enlistment under the command of Colonel Phineas Stearns Davis.

The regiment was attached to Grover's Brigade, Defenses of Washington, until February 1863, then to Jewett's Independent Brigade, XXII Corps, Department of Washington, until May 1863, the District of Washington, XXII Corps, until July 1863, the 1st Brigade, 2nd Division, I Corps, Army of the Potomac, until March 1864, the 1st Brigade, 2nd Division, V Corps, until June 1864, the 1st Brigade, 3rd Division, V Corps, until September 1864, and finally the 2nd Brigade, 3rd Division, V Corps, until June 1865.

The 39th Massachusetts Infantry mustered out of service at Washington, D.C. on June 1, 1865.

== Detailed service ==
Left Massachusetts for Washington, D.C., on or about September 6, 1862. The regiment saw duty in the defenses of Washington from Fort Tillinghast to Fort Craig, until September 14, 1862, then guarded the Potomac River from Edward's Ferry to Conrad's Ferry and Seneca Creek until October 20, and the Muddy Branch until November 10. The Infantry again saw action at Offutt's Cross Roads, Md., until December 21, and at Poolesville, Md., until April 15, 1863. In mid-April, 1863, the regiment moved to Washington, D.C., for guard and patrol duty until July 9. Moved to Harpers Ferry and Maryland Heights July 9–10, then to Funkstown, Maryland, July 12–13. Pursuit of Lee, July 14–27. Duty along the Rapidan until October. Bristoe Campaign, October 9–22. Advanced to line of the Rappahannock, November 7–8. Rappahannock Station November 7. Mine Run Campaign, November 26 – December 2. Duty on the Orange & Alexandria Railroad until May 1864. Demonstration on the Rapidan February 6–7. Rapidan Campaign May–June. Battle of the Wilderness May 5–7. Laurel Hill May 8. Spotsylvania May 8–12. Spotsylvania Court House May 12–21. Assault on the Salient May 12. North Anna River May 23–26. Jericho Ford May 23. On line of the Pamunkey May 26–28. Totopotomoy May 28–31. Cold Harbor June 1–12. Bethesda Church June 1–3. White Oak Swamp June 13. Before Petersburg June 16–18. Siege of Petersburg June 16, 1864 to April 2, 1865. Mine Explosion, Petersburg, July 30, 1864 (reserve). Weldon Railroad, August 18–21. Reconnaissance toward Dinwiddie Court House September 15. Warren's Raid on Weldon Railroad December 7–12. Dabney's Mills February 5–7, 1865. Appomattox Campaign March 28 – April 9. Davis Farm near Gravelly Run March 29. White Oak Road March 31. Five Forks April 1. Fall of Petersburg April 2. Pursuit of Lee, April 3–9. Appomattox Court House April 9. Surrender of Lee and his army. At Black and White Station until May 1. Moved to Manchester, then marched to Washington, D.C., May 1–15. Grand Review of the Armies, May 23.

== Casualties ==
The regiment lost a total of 279 men during service; 5 officers and 91 enlisted men killed or mortally wounded, and 183 enlisted men died of disease.

== Commanders ==
- Colonel Phineas Stearns Davis – mortally wounded July 7, 1864 while in the works at Petersburg
- Lieutenant Colonel Charles Lawrence Peirson
- Lieutenant Colonel Henry M. Tremlett – wounded in action at the Battle of White Oak Road
- Captain Joseph J. Cooper – commanded the regiment after Ltc Tremlett was wounded in action

== See also ==
- List of Massachusetts Civil War Units
- Massachusetts in the American Civil War
