= Douglas Conant =

American businessman

Douglas R. Conant
- Education: Northwestern University
- Occupations: Businessman, Author, Speaker
- Organization: ConantLeadership
- Known for: Success at Campbell's, high-performance leadership style
- Website: conantleadership.com

Douglas Conant is an American businessman, author, and speaker who was president and CEO of Campbell's (formerly Campbell Soup Company) until July 31, 2011. He is the author of TouchPoints, a New York Times bestseller and The Blueprint, a Wall Street Journal bestseller. From 2011 to 2018, he was a contributor to Harvard Business Review. He is the founder and current CEO of ConantLeadership.

== Career ==
Early in his career, Conant worked for The Parker Brothers Toy and Game Company, General Mills, and Kraft Foods. He was President of Nabisco Foods for five years prior to joining Campbell's. While at Campbell's, Conant led a highly successful turnaround following the layoff of much of the management team.

Under his leadership, Campbell's reversed a decline in market value, improved its financial profile, and enhanced its diversity and inclusion practices. Longtime protégé Denise Morrison, who worked for him at Nabisco as well as Campbell's, succeeded him as CEO.

Conant was the chairman of Avon Products from 2013 to 2016.

In 2011, he founded ConantLeadership, a community, training and development company, and educational resource hub for leaders dedicated to "championing leadership that works" in the 21st century.

== Leadership style ==
Conant is known for a leadership style that prioritizes integrity and gratitude.

== Early life and education ==
A native of Chicago, Conant earned his BA degree from Northwestern University and his MBA from the JL Kellogg School of Management at Northwestern University. He played tennis for Northwestern while earning his undergraduate degree. He later became an assistant coach for the tennis team while earning his graduate degree. Conant was inducted into the Intercollegiate Tennis Association Hall of Fame, and was awarded the David A. Benjamin Achievement Award in 2019.

== Honors and awards ==
Conant received the Stephen R. Covey 'Principle-Centered Leader Award' in 2022 and a 'Top Thought Leader: Lifetime Achievement Award' from Trust Across America in 2018. He was named a 'Top 100 Leadership Speaker' by Inc. Magazine.

== Books ==
- The Blueprint: 6 Practical Steps to Lift Your Leadership to New Heights (2020, co-authored with Amy Federman) ISBN 978-1-119-56009-8
- TouchPoints: Creating Powerful Leadership Connections in the Smallest of Moments (2011, co-authored with Mette Norgaard) ISBN 978-1-118-00435-7
