= Wisconsin Historical Museum =

Coordinates: 43°04′28″N 89°23′12″W

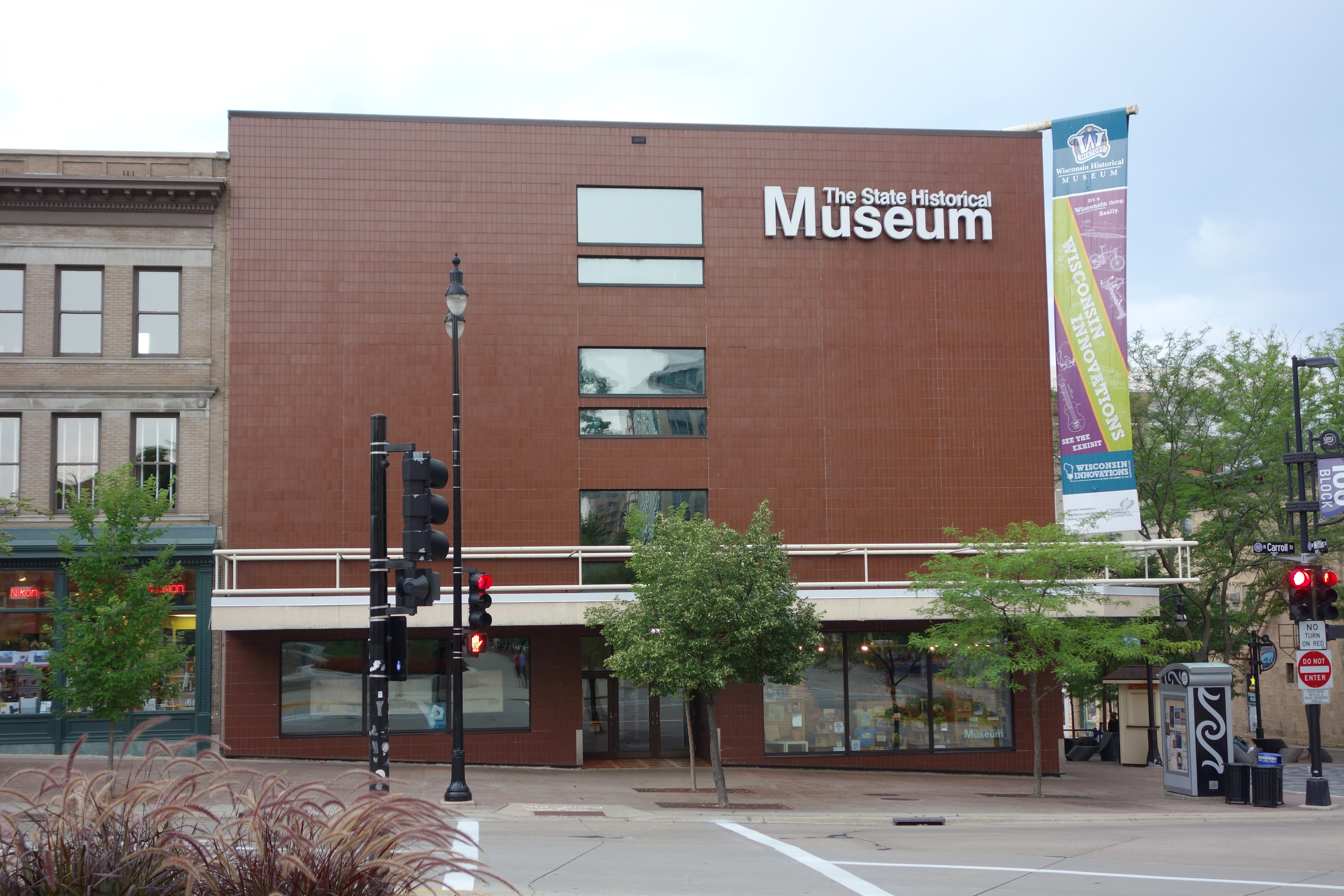
- Established: April 19, 1986
- Location: 30 N. Carroll Street; Madison, Wisconsin; United States
- Type: Historical museum
- Owner: Wisconsin Historical Society
- Public transit access: Metro Transit
- Website: www.wisconsinhistory.org

The Wisconsin Historical Museum is a museum in downtown Madison, Wisconsin, operated by the Wisconsin Historical Society (WHS) and dedicated to the history of Wisconsin. As of April 2026, the museum is closed for a complete replacement of its former building, although a gift shop remains open. The new Wisconsin History Center is expected to open in 2028.

In addition to Wisconsin history, the museum provides information about other American history topics through artifacts, photographs, full-scale dioramas, audio-visual presentations, and interactive multimedia programs.

== History ==
Since its founding in 1846, the Wisconsin Historical Society has made parts of its collections available for public viewing. When the South Wing of the Wisconsin State Capitol was completed in 1866, the Society was allowed to occupy the entire second floor with its "Historical Rooms". These rooms housed mostly the Society's vast library of books, but also "mementoes and relics of the recent war, and many curious articles, both natural and artificial, sent it from various sections of the State." When the Society moved into its current headquarters on the Library Mall in 1900, the museum displays went with it.

In 1980, the Society purchased a building on the western corner of Capitol Square, previously belonging to the Wolff, Kubly & Hirsig hardware store, to create for the first time a separate Wisconsin Historical Museum. The museum opened to the public on April 19, 1986.

In late 2004, the museum's existence was threatened due to budget cuts, but citing its role in the state's history, Wisconsin governor Jim Doyle restored its funding.

In addition to exhibits about traditional aspect of the state's history, the museum has also offered an exhibition on malted milk, which was first made in Wisconsin, and includes in its permanent collection a Big Boy, the mascot of a hamburger chain, rescued in 1985 when its restaurant closed. The museum also opened in 2012 an exhibit about Butch Vig's Smart Studios, a Madison recording facility that closed in 2010.

In 2022, WHS announced that the museum would close for approximately four years, allowing the existing museum and a neighboring museum to be torn down, so that a new Wisconsin History Center could be built in its place. The last exhibits in the old museum closed on November 27, 2022. The first floor of the museum remained open until October 2023, when demolition began. To continue some limited museum operations during the construction, WHS opened a History Maker Space in the nearby US Bank Plaza building, and a History Makers Tour bringing selected artifacts to locations across the state was started.

The construction project for the new museum received $112.3 million in state funding, and WHS sought $66.5 million in private donations to complete the project. The largest donation came from American Girl doll creator Pleasant Rowland and her husband W. Jerome Frautschi. A groundbreaking ceremony for the new museum was held on April 23, 2025, with leaders of the Ho-Chunk Nation of Wisconsin lighting tobacco to bless the space. On January 31, 2026, an ironworker at the site was critically injured after a beam was dropped from a crane.
