= Alban Jasper Conant =

American painter (1821–1915)

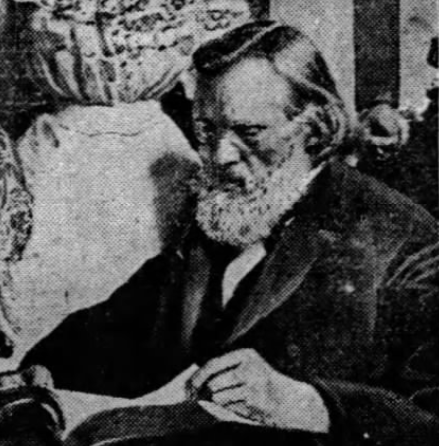
- Born: September 24, 1821; Chelsea, Vermont
- Died: February 3, 1915 (aged 93); New York, New York
- Education: Gouverneur Wesleyan Seminary
- Occupation: Painter
- Spouses: Sarah Mahala Howes (m. 1845; died 1867) Brianna C. Bryan (m. 1869; died 1875)

Alban Jasper Conant (September 24, 1821 – February 3, 1915) was an American painter best known for painting the first portrait of Abraham Lincoln.

== Personal life ==
A member of the Conant family and a descendant of Roger Conant, Conant was born in Chelsea, Vermont to Caleb and Sally (née Barnes) Conant. His father was a sign and house painter. He married Sarah Mahala Howes in New York in 1845. The couple had four daughters and four sons, of whom only three of the daughters survived to adulthood. After Sarah died in 1867, Conant remarried to Brianna C. Bryan in 1869. He had one son with his second wife before she died in 1875.

== Career ==
He graduated from Gouverneur Wesleyan Seminary in 1844 and later took a degree from Madison (later Colgate) University in Hamilton, New York. In 1857, he and his wife moved to St. Louis, Missouri, where he helped to found an art gallery. The Western Academy of Art was opened in St. Louis in 1860 as a fine art gallery.

In addition to painting Abraham Lincoln, he also created portraits of some of Lincoln's cabinet officers; Attorney General Edward Bates and Secretary of War Edwin Stanton. Notable paintings of his include When the Attack was Begun and Burial of DeSoto. Well-known portraits of his include portraits of Henry Ward Beecher, James McCosh, John Gilbert, General William Tecumseh Sherman and Major Robert Anderson at Fort Sumter.

His portraits are owned and displayed by a number of American institutions. They can be found at the Smithsonian American Art Museum, United States Department of Justice, the Missouri Historical Society, Colgate University, Princeton University, Amherst College, Dickinson College, the State Supreme Court of New York, the New-York Historical Society, and the Abraham Lincoln Presidential Library and Museum.

Conant also wrote or co-wrote several books. He wrote Foot-prints of vanished races in the Mississippi valley in 1879 and My acquaintance with Abraham Lincoln in 1893. Conant wrote A portrait painter's reminiscences of Lincoln in 1909 and eleven chapters of The Commonwealth of Missouri: A Centennial Record in 1877. The chapters were about the archaeology of Missouri.

He served as a curator at University of Missouri in Columbia, Missouri, for eight years. He founded the School of Mines and Metallurgy and then supervised the school for three years. He lived in New York City from about 1885 until his death in 1915.

== Works ==
- "Switzler's Illustrated History of Missouri, 1541-1877" (1877)
- "A Commonwealth of Missouri; A Centennial Record" (1877)
- "Foot-prints of vanished races in the Mississippi valley : being an account of some of the monuments and relics of prehistoric races scattered over its surface, with suggestions as to their origin and uses" (1879)
- "A Portrait Painter's Reminiscences of Lincoln" (1893)
- "Portrait of William Carr Lane"
- "The First Gun at Fort Sumter"
