= Chicago Union Stock Yards fire (1934) =

Meatpacking district, Illinois

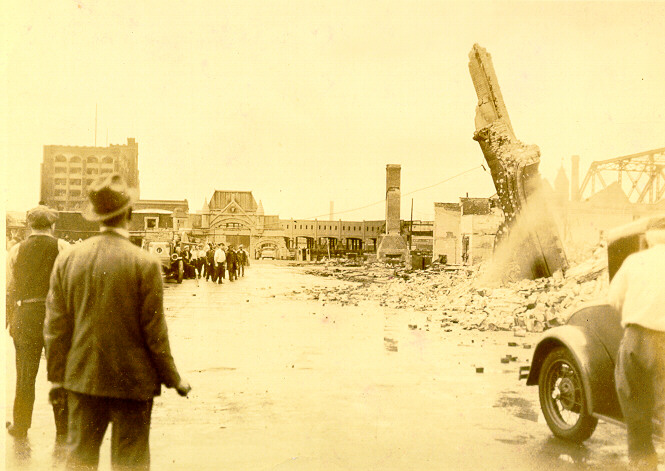
Photograph of the destruction, taken by an employee of the Yards who later became the mother of a Wikipedia contributor

The Chicago Union Stock Yards fire of 1934 was the second-most destructive fire in the city's history, after the Great Chicago Fire of 1871, in terms of property damage and buildings lost. The Union Stock Yards of Chicago, Illinois in the United States were, at the time, the commercial butchering and meatpacking center of the Midwest. The financial cost of the fire, which began Saturday, May 19, 1934, was estimated at US$8 million (about $193 million today). Six square blocks were destroyed. One employee and thousands of animals died.

A fire station, six fire engines and a hook-and-ladder truck were among the losses. According to the Chicago Tribune, "Sirens wailed across the city, as five-sixths of Chicago's pumpers and ladder trucks raced to the stockyards. Their vacated firehouses were staffed with units sent from Blue Island, Chicago Heights, Oak Lawn, Harvey and other suburbs. With 200 Chicago police officers doing crowd control at the yards, volunteers manned their beats."

The fire was probably started by a still-lit cigarette discarded off the 43rd Street Viaduct into the straw-lined wooden cattle pens below.

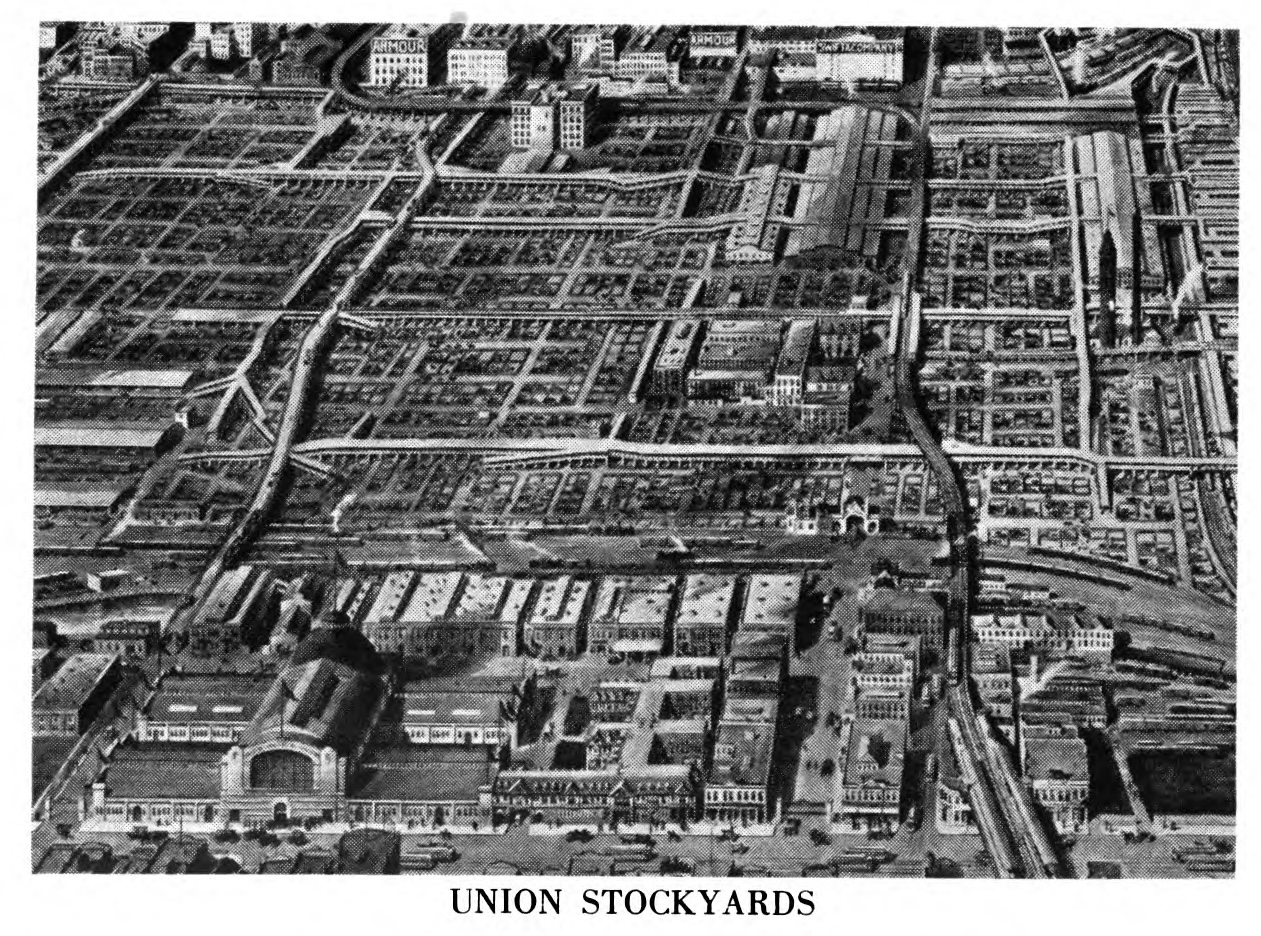
Stock Yards in 1933, year prior to the fire, from a Century of Progress city guidebook

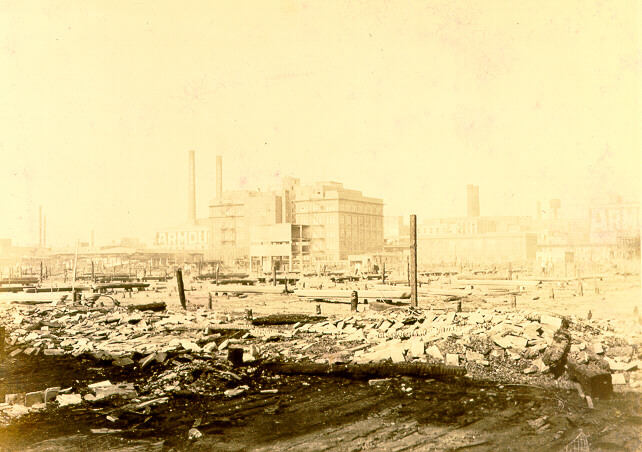
Aftermath

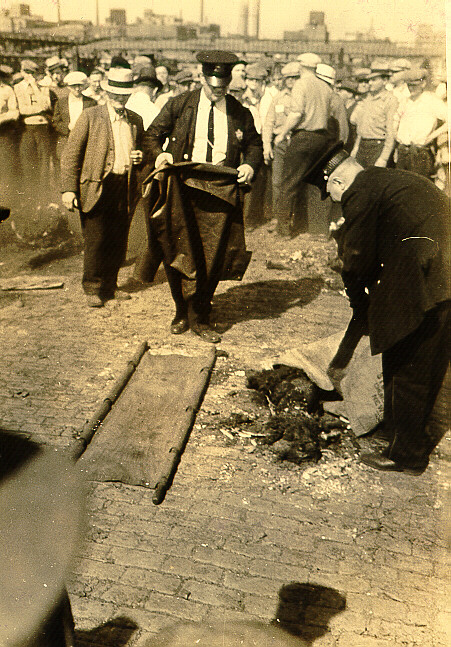
Aftermath

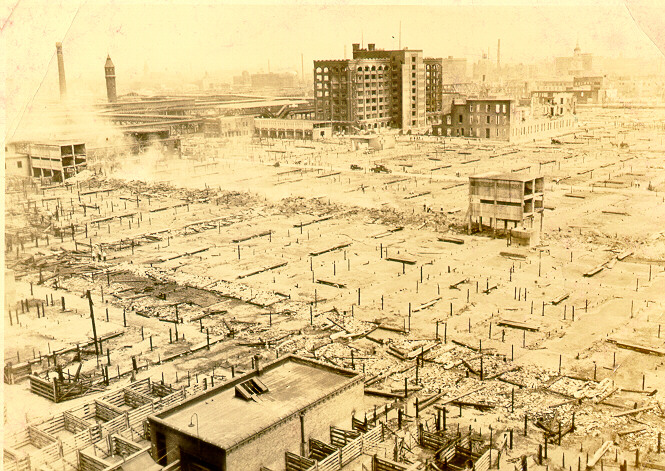
Aftermath

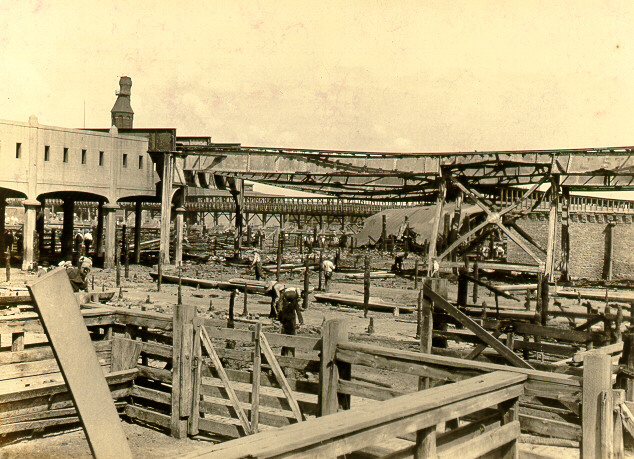
Aftermath
