= Norman Francis Conant =

American medical school professor

Norman Francis Conant (9 March 1908, Walpole, Massachusetts – 23 April 1984, Durham, North Carolina) was an American medical school professor and one of the pioneers of medical mycology.

== Education ==
Conant graduated in 1930 with a Bachelor of Science degree from Bates College. At Harvard University he graduated in 1931 with a master's degree and in 1933 with a Ph.D. His doctoral dissertation was supervised by William H. Weston Jr. As a postdoc supported by a Traveling Fellowship from Harvard, Conant studied from 1933 to 1934 at the Institut Pasteur with Maurice Langeron and Paul Guerra and also spent some time with Raymond Sabouraud.

== Career and research ==
Soon after returning to the US, Conant became a research assistant at Massachusetts General Hospital and was invited by David Tillerson Smith to interview at Duke University for the position of instructor of mycology in the Duke University School of Medicine and mycologist for the Duke University Hospital. In 1935 Conant was appointed to the position, thus becoming "the first individual hired as a medical mycologist at a medical school." In 1943 he studied medical entomology and malariology for 3 months in a course offered by the Army Medical School. Because of his knowledge of medical mycology, he became the instructor for the mycological part of the summer course, continuing in that role for the 3-month sessions from 1943 to 1946. In 1944 he also had postdoctoral training at Rio de Janeiro's Oswaldo Cruz Foundation and at the University of São Paulo. The Army Surgeon General asked him to write a textbook on medical mycology. With 4 physicians from Duke University Medical School, he published in 1944 the requested textbook under the title Manual of Clinical Mycology. The textbook was a great success, with a 2nd edition in 1954 and a 3rd edition in 1971. He was also one of the editors of the 12th edition of Zinnser Microbiology.

Conant became a professor at the Duke University Medical School and from 1958 to 1968 chaired of the Department of Microbiology. From 1948 until his retirement in 1973, he taught an intensive 4-week summer course on medical mycology. The course acquired a worldwide reputation. He directed about two dozen doctoral students, including Lorraine Friedman and Carlyn Halde, and had an important influence on students around the world.

== Personal life ==
In 1930, Norman F. Conant married Sylvia Clare Nute (1910–1996), who was a student at Bates College. They had seven children.
