= Levi L. Conant =

American mathematician

Levi Leonard Conant (March 3, 1857, Littleton, Massachusetts – October 11, 1916, Worcester, Massachusetts) was an American mathematician specializing in trigonometry.

== Education and career ==
He attended Phillips Academy, Andover and Dartmouth College (B.A., 1879, A.M., 1887) and later Syracuse University (Ph.D., 1893), studying mathematics.

He was professor of mathematics at the Dakota School of Mines from 1887 to 1890, then attended Clark University for a year before beginning teaching at Worcester Polytechnic Institute (WPI) in Worcester, Massachusetts in 1891, where he taught for the remainder of his life.

He was head of the Mathematics Department at WPI from 1908 until his death, and was interim president from 1911 to 1913. He married twice, first in 1884 to Laura Chamberlain (died 1911) and again in 1912 to Emma B. Fisher.

On October 11, 1916, aged 59, he was struck by a truck in front of his home and was killed.

== The Number Concept ==
Conant's most significant work was his 1896 book The Number Concept: Its Origin and Development. This was a seminal work in the anthropological and psychological study of numerals, focusing on the analysis of Native American number systems from a generally cultural evolutionist theoretical perspective. Conant's ethnographic data generally reflected the limited development of anthropology at the time.

Conant's characterization of the numeral systems of Native American languages as 'primitive' or 'savage' is not widely accepted today. Conant's work, however, influenced scholars such as Lucien Lévy-Bruhl, and represented the first systematic comparative analysis of numeral systems of North America.

== Legacy ==
Conant left $10,000 to the American Mathematical Society in his will, which was disbursed in 1976 following the death of Conant's second wife. In 2000 the Society established a yearly prize (Levi L. Conant Prize) in his name to honor the best expository paper published in the Bulletin of the AMS or the Notices of the AMS in the past five years.

== Major works ==
- The Number Concept: Its Origin and Development (1896)
- Original Exercises in Plane and Solid Geometry (1905)
- Plane and Spherical Trigonometry (1909)
