= Conant baronets =

Baronetcy in the Baronetage of the United Kingdom

Conant of Lyndon
- Creation date: 30 Jun 1954
- Created by: Queen Elizabeth II
- Baronetage: Baronetage of the United Kingdom
- First holder: Sir Roger Conant
- Status: Extant
- Seats: Lyndon Hall, Rutland
- Motto: Conanti Dabitur (Latin) (Attempting Given)

The Conant Baronetcy, of Lyndon in the County of Rutland, is a title in the Baronetage of the United Kingdom. It was created on 30 June 1954 for the Conservative Party politician Roger Conant. The second Baronet was High Sheriff of Rutland in 1960.

== Conant baronets, of Lyndon (1954) ==
- Sir Roger John Edward Conant, 1st Baronet (1899–1973)
- Sir John Ernest Michael Conant, 2nd Baronet (1923–2024)
- Sir Simon Edward Christopher Conant, 3rd Baronet (born 1958).

== Arms ==
Coat of arms of Conant baronets

Escutcheon
Quarterly: 1st & 4th per saltire Gules and Azure billetée Or (Conant); 2nd & 3rd Ermine on a bend Vert between three lions' heads erased two and one Azure as many roses Or (Whiston).
Motto
Conanti Dabitur

== Family Tree ==
Conant Family
Baronet Conant

Ernest William Proby Conant; 1852-1920
Rupert Thomas Conant -1940 killed in action at Dunkirk	Sir Roger John Edward Conant Bt. CVO, DL; 1st Baronet of Lyndon; Created 1954; 1899-1976
Sir John Ernest Michael Conant Bt. 2nd Baronet of Lyndon born 1923	Guy Timothy Geoffrey Conant born 1924	Charles Richard Conant born 1929

== Notes ==
Baronetage of the United Kingdom
Preceded by Brain baronets	Conant baronets of Lyndon; 30 June 1954	Succeeded by Nelson baronets
