= Sir Roger Conant, 1st Baronet =

British politician

Sir Roger Conant

Member of Parliament
- In office 29 June 1937 – 18 September 1959
- Preceded by: Stanley Baldwin
- Succeeded by: Kenneth Lewis
- Constituency: Bewdley (1937–1950); Rutland and Stamford (1950–1959)
- In office 27 October 1931 – 25 October 1935
- Preceded by: George Benson
- Succeeded by: George Benson
- Constituency: Chesterfield

Personal details
- Born: Roger John Edward Conant; 28 May 1899 London, England
- Died: 30 March 1973 (aged 73) London, England
- Party: Conservative

Sir Roger John Edward Conant, 1st Baronet, CVO, DL (28 May 1899 – 30 March 1973) was a Conservative Party politician in the United Kingdom. He was a Member of Parliament (MP) for more than 25 years between 1931 and 1959.

Born in Kensington, London, he was an unsuccessful candidate in the Chesterfield constituency at the 1929 general election, but won the seat at the 1931 general election when the Labour Party split over Ramsay MacDonald's formation of the National Government.

He lost the Chesterfield seat at the 1935 general election, but after the retirement in 1937 of Stanley Baldwin, he was returned to Parliament at a by-election for Baldwin's Bewdley constituency in Worcestershire. He held the seat until its abolition for the 1950 general election, when he was elected as MP for Rutland and Stamford.

Appointed a Commander of the Royal Victorian Order (CVO) in the 1953 Coronation Honours, Conant was created a baronet on 30 June 1954.

Sir Roger retired from the House of Commons at the 1959 general election. He died in 1973 in Chelsea.

== Arms ==
Coat of arms of Sir Roger Conant, 1st Baronet

Crest
On a mount Vert a stag Proper the dexter foreleg resting on a shield Gules.
Escutcheon
Quarterly: 1st & 4th per saltire Gules and Azure billetée Or (Conant); 2nd & 3rd Ermine on a bend Vert between three lions' heads erased two and one Azure as many roses Or (Whiston).
Motto
Conanti Dabitur

Parliament of the United Kingdom
Preceded by George Benson	Member of Parliament for Chesterfield; 1931–1935	Succeeded by George Benson
Preceded by Stanley Baldwin	Member of Parliament for Bewdley; 1937–1950	Constituency abolished
Preceded by Lord Willoughby de Eresby	Member of Parliament for Rutland and Stamford; 1950–1959	Succeeded by Kenneth Lewis
Political offices
Preceded by Frank Collindridge	Comptroller of the Household; 1951–1954	Succeeded by Tam Galbraith
Baronetage of the United Kingdom
New creation	Baronet (of Lyndon, Rutland); 1954–1973	Succeeded by John Conant
