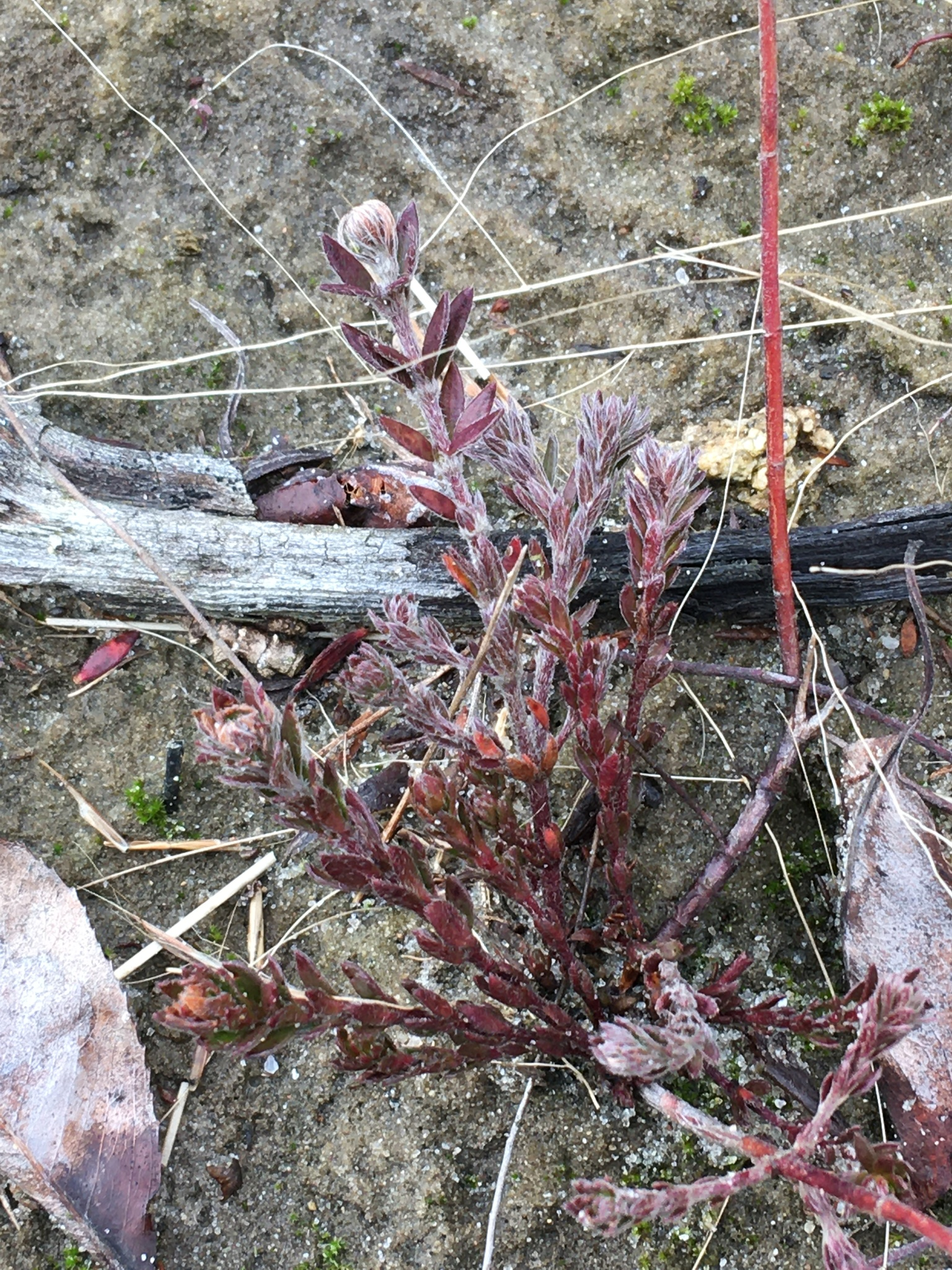

Conservation status
- Secure (NatureServe)

Scientific classification
- Kingdom: Plantae
- Clade: Tracheophytes
- Clade: Angiosperms
- Clade: Eudicots
- Clade: Rosids
- Order: Malvales
- Family: Cistaceae
- Genus: Lechea
- Species: L. maritima

Binomial name
- Lechea maritima Legg. ex Britton

Synonyms
- Lechea maritima var. typica Hodgdon; Lechea minor var. maritima (Legg.) A.Gray; Lechea thymifolia Pursh

= Lechea maritima =

Species of flowering plant

Lechea maritima, also known as beach pinweed, is a herbaceous perennial plant in the Cistaceae family found along coastal sandy dunes of the East Coast of the United States and into Atlantic Canada.

== Description ==
Lechea maritima is visually distinct from other Lechea species, characterized by dense, white trichomes, oblong leaves of the basal shoots, and a bushy-branched habit. The white trichomes help to distinguish it from the other pinweed in its northern range, narrowleaf pinweed (Lechea intermedia). Like Lechea racemulosa, it has narrowly elliptic stem leaves, sepals with three veins, and pedicels that thicken below the calyx. Plants flower in the mid to late summer; fruits develop in late summer to early fall. The radial shoots of the plant do not begin to form until the late autumn and continue developing until December.

Flowering stems are 20–35 centimetres (8–14 in) tall and extensively branched.

=== Subspecies ===
Three subspecies of beach pinweed have been described: Virginia beach pinweed (Lechea maritima var. virginica), Gulf of St. Lawrence pinweed (Lechea maritima var subcylindrica), and beach pinweed (Lechea maritima var maritima).

Gulf of St. Lawrence beach pinweed is a highly specialized dune plant that does not grow in the foredunes, which is often densely populated by American beachgrass. It is only found on the eastern coast of New Brunswick and in the Conway Sandhills of Prince Edward Island. This subspecies has been assessed as a species of special concern; over 60% of individuals are found in protected areas. The largest Canadian populations are in Kouchibouguac National Park. First Nations such as the Mi'kmaq Confederacy of Prince Edward Island and the Lennox Island First Nation, as well as the Nature Conservancy of Canada, are involved in conservation efforts to protect a population on Hog Island, Prince Edward Island.

Hodgdon (1938) stated that the Virginia beach pinweed range was from southern Maine to Delaware; in 1938, var. virginica was known only from Norfolk, Northampton, and Princess Anne, Virginia. As of 2007, it was identified from eight countries in Virginia, as well as one county in Delaware, Maryland, and North Carolina. Virginia beach pinweed generally have thicker stems than those of var. maritima and is more robust.

== Distribution ==
Beach pinweed is found almost exclusively along the Atlantic coast, but extends inward in Massachusetts and New Hampshire for approximately 150 kilometres (93 mi). It is found from New Brunswick to North Carolina. In the early 1910s, it was described as one of the most common plants on the island of Nantucket where it grew in "pure" sands.

It is often found with Hudsonia tomentosa, another species in the rock rose family.

== Conservation ==
Beach pinweed is threatened by rising tides that lead to dune erosion due to climate change. The species is considered Globally Secure (G5), but the Gulf of St. Lawrence beach pinweed population has a national rank of imperilled (N2) in Canada.
