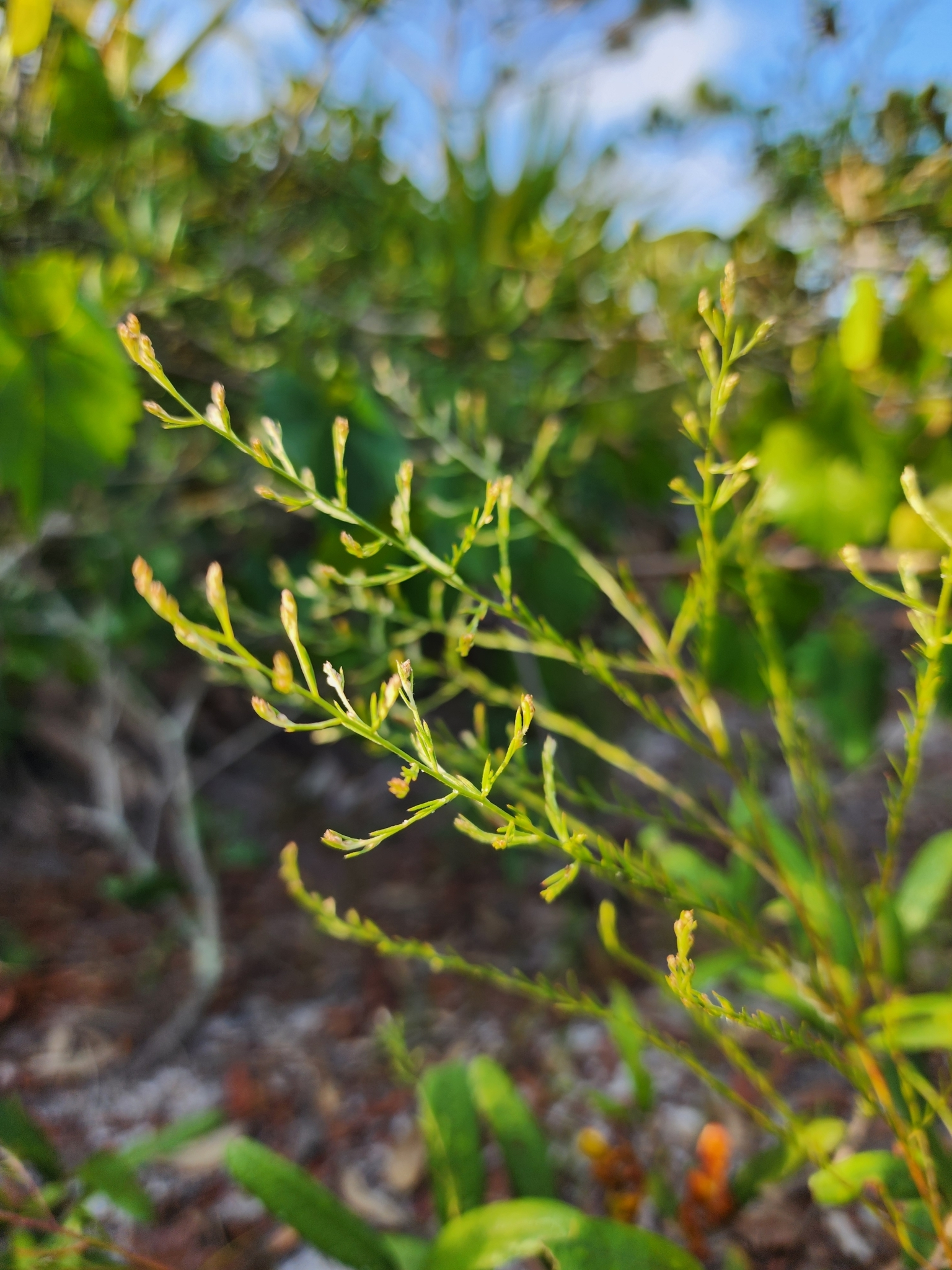

Conservation status
- Apparently Secure (NatureServe)

Scientific classification
- Kingdom: Plantae
- Clade: Tracheophytes
- Clade: Angiosperms
- Clade: Eudicots
- Clade: Rosids
- Order: Malvales
- Family: Cistaceae
- Genus: Lechea
- Species: L. torreyi

Binomial name
- Lechea torreyi (Chapm.)Legg. ex Britton

= Lechea torreyi =

Species of flowering plant

Lechea torreyi, commonly called sandhill pinweed, is a species of perennial flowering plant native to the U.S. southeast coastal plain in the states of Florida, Alabama, South Carolina, North Carolina, and Georgia. It could also be present in two other areas: in Virginia and in Belize as a disjunct population.

== Habitat ==
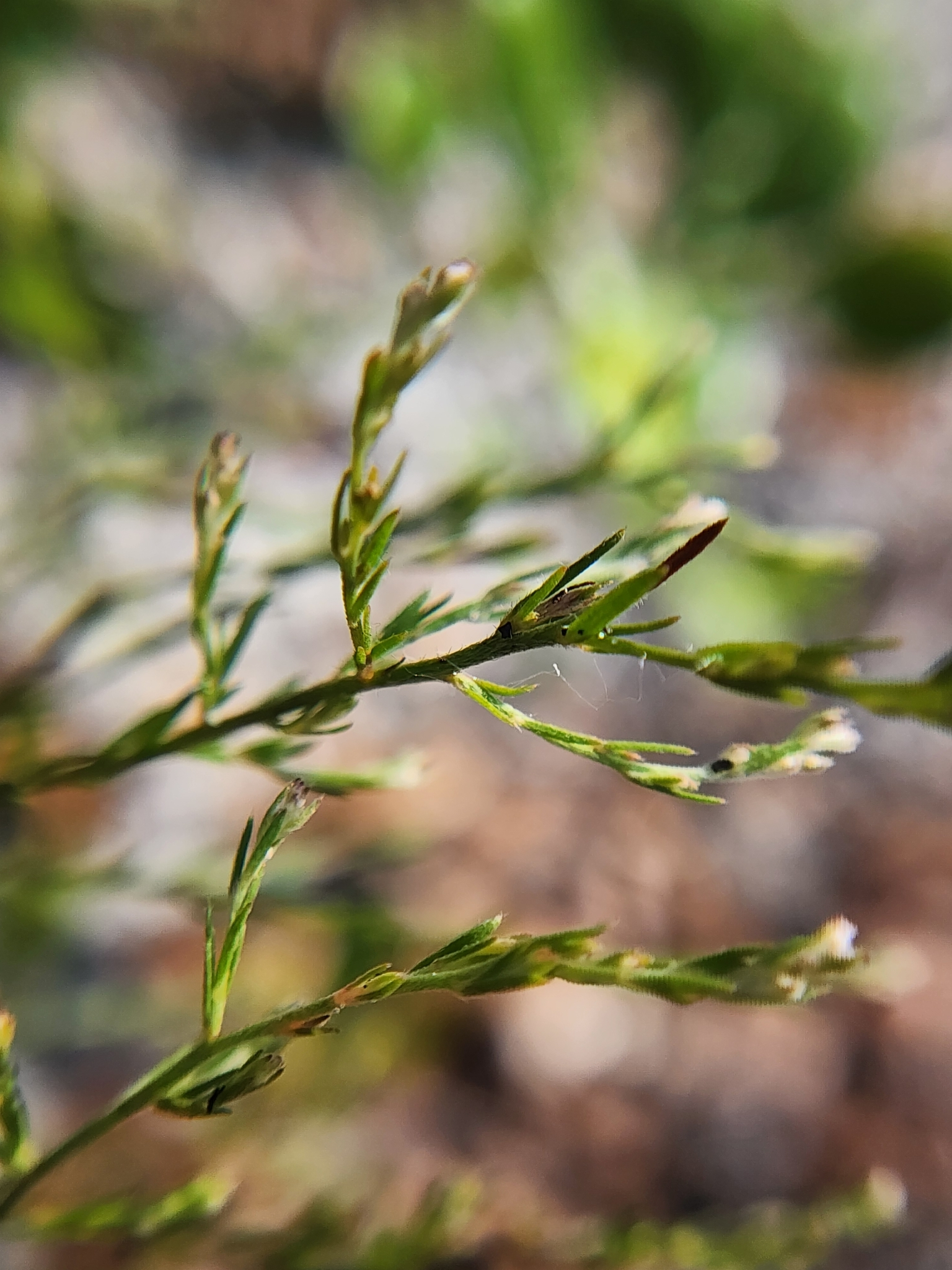
In bloom

It occurs in sandy, fire-dependent pine habitats of the southeast including pine flatwoods, longleaf pine sandhill, and pine barrens.

== Conservation ==
Due to lack of sufficient data, there has been trouble fully assessing the level of threat faced by this species. However, it seems to have a rather wide range and adaptable habitat preferences which lend to its resilience. Possible threats include habitat loss from development for real estate and agriculture, infrastructure and its maintenance, fire suppression, and invasive species.
