= David Stoughton Conant =

American botanist

David Stoughton Conant (June 17, 1949, Springfield, Vermont – June 27, 2018) was an American botanist, specializing in the systematics and genetics of tropical tree ferns.

== Biography ==
After graduating from Fall Mountain Regional High School, Conant matriculated at the University of New Hampshire. There he received in 1971 a Bachelor of Science degree in botany and was mentored by Albion R. Hodgdon. At Harvard University, Conant graduated with a Ph.D. in botany. His doctoral dissertation was supervised by Rolla M. Tryon Jr.

In 1976 Conant became a faculty member in the Science Department of Lyndon State College (which in 2018 became part of Northern Vermont University). In 2009 he retired from Lyndon State College and donated his personal herbarium of over 3,000 dried botanical specimens to the college. He was the editor-in-chief of the journal Rhodora for a brief period in 1996. He spent sabbatical years at Mount Holyoke College, Dartmouth College, and Duke University.

As a professor at Lyndon State College, he taught a variety of different subjects, including botany, genetics, biochemistry, and systematic botany to name a few. Over his 32-year career, he was a recipient of multiple National Science Foundation Grants which enabled him to travel to New Guinea, Borneo, Australia, Central America, Venezuela, and the Caribbean to continue his passionate study of tree ferns. He named several species of tree ferns, including one which he named after his mother and one which he named after his wife.

After retiring from Lyndon State College, Conant started a business doing excavation projects. Later in Barnet, Vermont, he concentrated on working with his wife on their property, where they cleared fields and built a network of roads through wooded areas.

In 1979 he married Aminta Kitfield (honored by the botanical eponym Cyathea amintae). Upon his death he was survived by his widow, three daughters, and four grandchildren.

== Awards and honors ==
- 1991 — Edgard T. Wherry Award of the Botanical Society of America for the article Phylogenetic implications of chloroplast DNA variation in the Cyatheaceae coauthored by Diana B. Stein and Angela E. Valinski
- 1996–1998 — President of the New England Botanical Club
- 2004–2008 — President of the American Fern Society

== Eponyms ==
- Alsophila conantiana Lehnert

== Selected publications ==
- Conant, David S. (1975). "Hybrids in American Cyatheaceae". Rhodora. 77 (812): 441–455. JSTOR 23310958.
- Conant, David S.; Cooper-Driver, Gillian (1980). "Autogamous Allohomoploidy in Alsophila and Nephelea (Cyatheaceae): A New Hypothesis for Speciation in Homoploid Homosporous Ferns". American Journal of Botany. 67 (9): 1269–1288. doi:10.1002/j.1537-2197.1980.tb07760.x.
- Conant, David S. (1983). "A Revision of the Genus Alsophila (Cyatheaceae) in the Americas". Journal of the Arnold Arboretum. 64 (3): 333–382. doi:10.5962/bhl.part.27408. JSTOR 43782112.
- Stein, D. B.; Conant, D. S.; Ahearn, M. E.; Jordan, E. T.; Kirch, S. A.; Hasebe, M.; Iwatsuki, K.; Tan, M. K.; Thomson, J. A. (1992). "Structural rearrangements of the chloroplast genome provide an important phylogenetic link in ferns". Proceedings of the National Academy of Sciences. 89 (5): 1856–1860. Bibcode:1992PNAS...89.1856S. doi:10.1073/pnas.89.5.1856. PMC 48552. PMID 1542683.
- Burke, Donald H.; Raubeson, Linda A.; Alberti, Marie; Hearst, John E.; Jordan, Elizabeth T.; Kirch, Susan A.; Valinski, Angela E. C.; Conant, David S.; Stein, Diana B. (1993). "ThechlL (FRXC) gene: Phylogenetic distribution in vascular plants and DNA sequence from Polystichum acrostichoides (Pteridophyta) and Synechococcus sp. 7002 (Cyanobacteria)". Plant Systematics and Evolution. 187 (1–4): 89–102. doi:10.1007/BF00994092. hdl:2027.42/41636. S2CID 5196047.
- Conant, David S.; Stein, Diana B.; Valinski, Angela E. C.; Sudarsanam, Priya; Ahearn, Mary E. (1994). "Phylogenetic Implications of Chloroplast DNA Variation in the Cyatheaceae. I.". Systematic Botany. 19 (1): 60–72. doi:10.2307/2419712. JSTOR 2419712.
- Conant, David S.; Raubeson, Linda A.; Attwood, Deborah K.; Stein, Diana B. (1995). "The Relationships of Papuasian Cyatheaceae to New World Tree Ferns". American Fern Journal. 85 (4): 328–340. doi:10.2307/1547813. JSTOR 1547813.
- Korall, Petra; Conant, David S.; Schneider, Harald; Ueda, Kunihiko; Nishida, Harufumi; Pryer, Kathleen M. (2006). "On the Phylogenetic Position of Cystodium: It's Not a Tree Fern – It's a Polypod!". American Fern Journal. 96 (2): 45. doi:10.1640/0002-8444(2006)96[45:OTPPOC]2.0.CO;2. ISSN 0002-8444. S2CID 14914433.
- Korall, Petra; Pryer, Kathleen M.; Metzgar, Jordan S.; Schneider, Harald; Conant, David S. (2006). "Tree ferns: Monophyletic groups and their relationships as revealed by four protein-coding plastid loci". Molecular Phylogenetics and Evolution. 39 (3): 830–845. doi:10.1016/j.ympev.2006.01.001. PMID 16481203.
- Korall, Petra; Conant, David S.; Metzgar, Jordan S.; Schneider, Harald; Pryer, Kathleen M. (2007). "A molecular phylogeny of scaly tree ferns (Cyatheaceae)". American Journal of Botany. 94 (5): 873–886. doi:10.3732/ajb.94.5.873. PMID 21636456.
- Stein, Diana B.; Hutton, Cynthia; Conant, David S.; Haufler, Christopher H.; Werth, Charles R. (2010). "Reconstructing Dryopteris "semicristata"(Dryopteridaceae): Molecular profiles of tetraploids verify their undiscovered diploid ancestor". American Journal of Botany. 97 (6): 998–1004. doi:10.3732/ajb.0900355. hdl:1808/13323. PMID 21622469.
