= Johan Leche =

Swedish physician and naturalist (1704–1764)

Johan Leche (22 September 1704 – 17 June 1764) was a Swedish physician and naturalist. He collaborated with Carolus Linnaeus who named a plant genus Lechea and an insect Phalaena lecheana after him. He was a pioneer of dendrochrononology and climate study in Finland and Sweden.

== Life and work ==
Leche was born in Barkåkra parish, Skåne, to vicar Jöns Leche and his wife Kristina Paulin. Jöns Leche had studied at Lund University and introduced his children to the study of natural history. After the death of his father, he was taken care of by his step father Anders Lunnius. Initially he trained in theology to enter the church in Lund University. He collected specimens of natural history and this led to his work Florula Simonstorpiana on the plants of Simonstorp where he worked briefly as a private tutor. Here he had access to the library of the assessor Nils Bildensköld. In 1733 he gave up theology and with the help of the priest Kilian Stobaeus decided to shift to medicine and he became an anatomy prosector in 1735 and received a doctorate in 1740. He was inspired by Linnaeus to study natural history in his spare time. He served as a provincial physician in Skaraborg County and five years later became a physician in the East India Company in Gothenburg. Around 1742 he became interested in climate measurement and began to conduct studies in meteorology while collaborating with Anders Celsius (1701–1744) and Pehr Elvius (1710–1749). In 1743 he failed to get a position at Lund that became vacant following the death of Johan Jacob von Döbeln. He was elected to the Swedish Academy of Sciences in 1746. In 1747 he applied to the Åbo Akademi where a position of professor of medicine became vacant by the death of Herman Spöring and he was appointed to it in 1748. In 1754 his daughter Maria Elisabeth was the first to receive smallpox inoculation. Here he was involved in organizing mineral collections, building an anatomy department, developing a medical garden, and a chemical laboratory. He collected daily weather observations until his death. Leche's students were few and included Johan Grysselius with whom he examined the migration of swallows, having kept records of the earliest arrival of swallows annually. He also made observations of the northern lights.

Leche's meticulous approach to weather recording also extended to his pioneering studies in dendrochronology. In 1757 he had noted the death of numerous trees and decided to examine the evidence of droughts in the tree rings. He also considered the value of understanding climate periodicity to agriculture. He later found that 1757 was the driest summer in his 13 years of measurement. He considered but dismissed the possibility of a 10-year cycle of high rainfall.
