= Emily Frances Fletcher =

American botanist (1845–1923)

Emily Frances Fletcher (1845–1923) was an American botanist, who was notable for collecting plants in New England.

== Biography ==
Fletcher was born on January 17, 1845, in Westford, Massachusetts, in the United States of America. She attended the Westford Academy in Westford. She specialised in the collection of invasive plants which grew in the wool waste of the woollen mills in eastern Massachusetts, some of which had arrived in imported wool and camel hair. Her collection of over 600 such plants was deposited with the Gray Herbarium at Harvard University. She contributed to Flora of Middlesex County (1888) and published ten papers in the New England botanical journal Rhodora in 1902–17.
