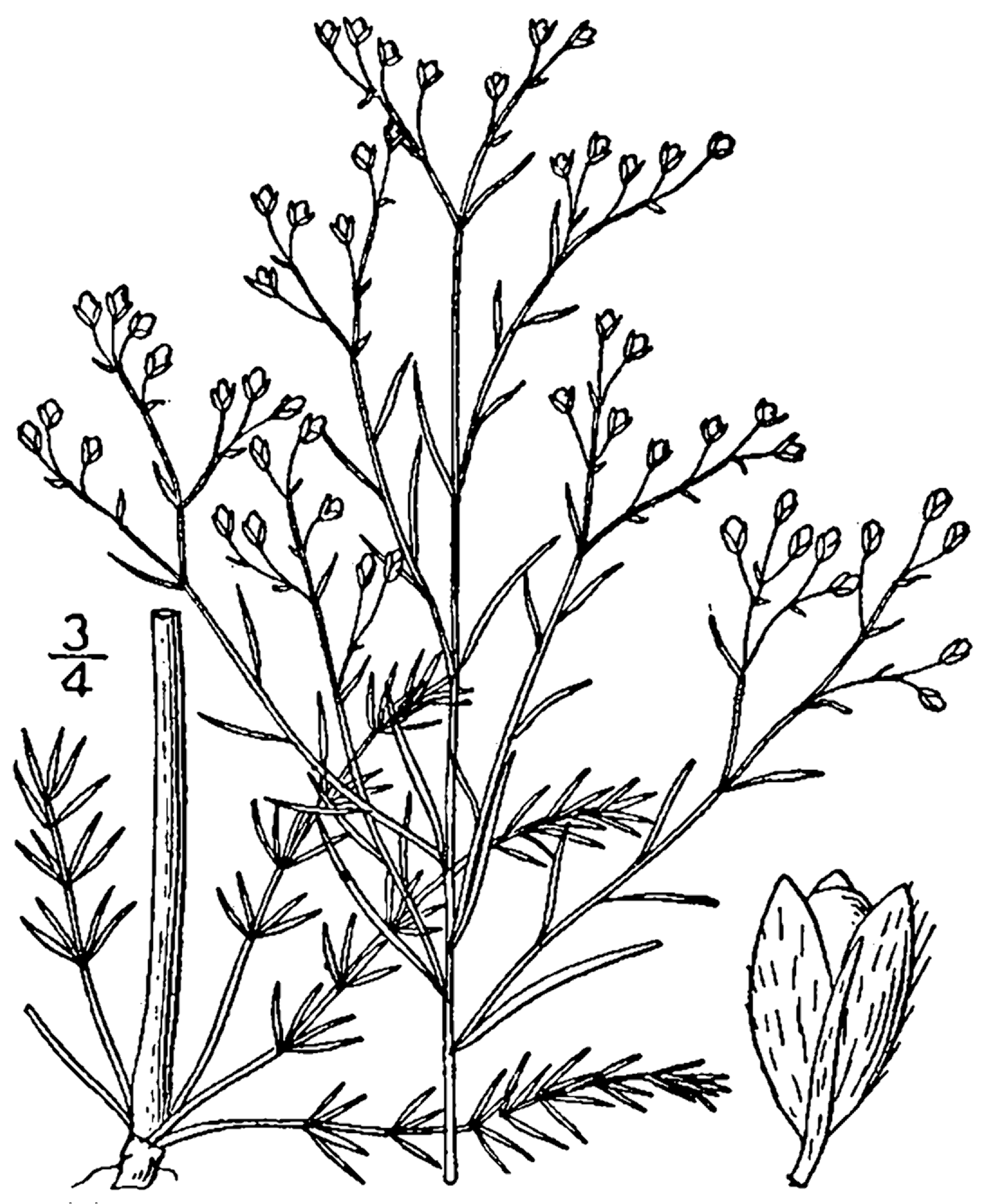

Scientific classification
- Kingdom: Plantae
- Clade: Tracheophytes
- Clade: Angiosperms
- Clade: Eudicots
- Clade: Rosids
- Order: Malvales
- Family: Cistaceae
- Genus: Lechea
- Species: L. pulchella

Binomial name
- Lechea pulchella Raf.

= Lechea pulchella =

Species of perennial herb

Lechea pulchella is a species of perennial herb native to the eastern United States.

There are three varieties:

- Lechea pulchella Raf. var. pulchella
- Lechea pulchella var. moniliformis (E.P Bicknell) Mohlenbr.
- Lechea pulchella var. ramosissima (Hodgon) Sorrie & Weakley

== Distribution and habitat ==
Lechea pulchella var. pulchella ranges from eastern Massachusetts west to northeastern Ohio and south to central Virginia. It grows in dry woodlands and disturbed places.

Lechea pulchella var. moniliformis is found on the Coastal Plain to Nantucket Island, extending from Massachusetts south to southern New Jersey, with a disjunct population along the Great Lakes. It grows in dry sandy soils.

Lechea pulchella var. ramosissima is distributed from southeastern Virginia south to northern Florida and west to eastern Louisiana, with a disjunct population in Coffee County, Tennessee. It is found in pine-oak woodlands, pine savannas, longleaf pine sandhills, pine flatwoods, openings in maritime forests, and occasionally in wet, peaty soils.
