= Lechea lakelae =

Conservation status
- Presumed Extinct (NatureServe)

Scientific classification
- Kingdom: Plantae
- Clade: Tracheophytes
- Clade: Angiosperms
- Clade: Eudicots
- Clade: Rosids
- Order: Malvales
- Family: Cistaceae
- Genus: Lechea
- Species: L. lakelae

Binomial name
- Lechea lakelae Wilbur

Species of flowering plant

Lechea lakelae, commonly referred to as Lakela's pinweed, is a possibly extinct species of flowering plant endemic to the US state of Florida, where it is only known from Marco Island in Collier County.

== Habitat ==
This species is only known from the open white sands of fire-dependent habitats of coastal scrub and scrubby flatwoods.

== Conservation ==
The species was only first collected in 1964, and was most recently collected from a vacant lot in 1987. All collections are solely from Marco Island, which has since been heavily developed. Extensive efforts at relocation have not resulted in any plants being found.
