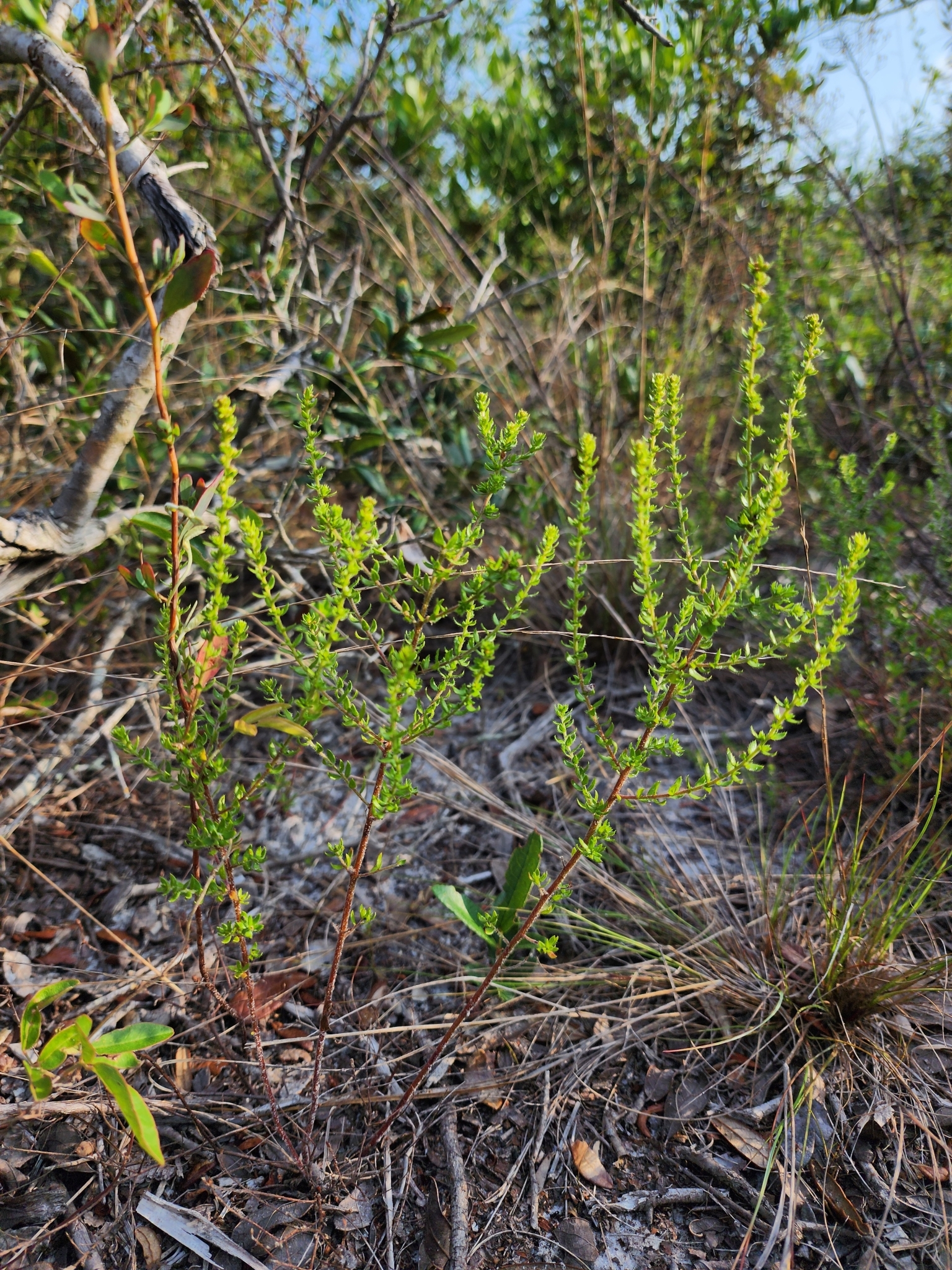

Conservation status
- Imperiled (NatureServe)

Scientific classification
- Kingdom: Plantae
- Clade: Tracheophytes
- Clade: Angiosperms
- Clade: Eudicots
- Clade: Rosids
- Order: Malvales
- Family: Cistaceae
- Genus: Lechea
- Species: L. divaricata

Binomial name
- Lechea divaricata Shuttlew. ex Britton

= Lechea divaricata =

Species of flowering plant

Lechea divaricata, commonly called drysand pinweed or pine pinweed, is an endangered perennial herb or subshrub endemic to the U.S. state of Florida.

== Habitat ==
It occurs in exposed, sandy areas of fire-dependent Florida scrub habitats, especially scrubby flatwoods.

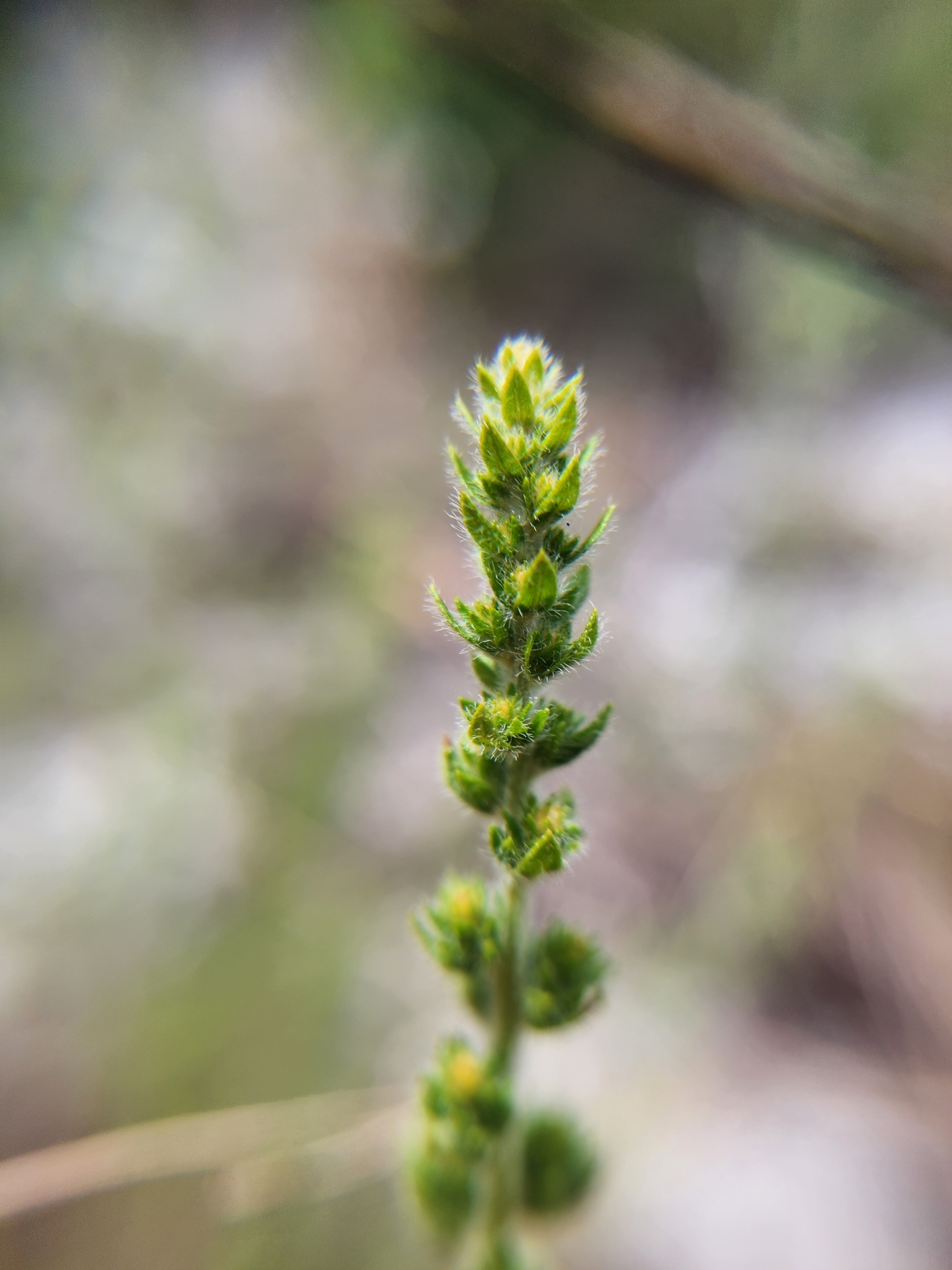
Breaking leaf bud

== Range ==
Its documented range is limited to the central & southern counties of Florida, from Citrus County to Volusia County at the northern extent to Collier County and Miami-Dade County at the southern extent. It is known from an estimated 50 to 80 populations across this range, with about 25 of those being considered large enough to be healthy. It is facing extreme pressure from habitat loss due to urban sprawl and agriculture.
