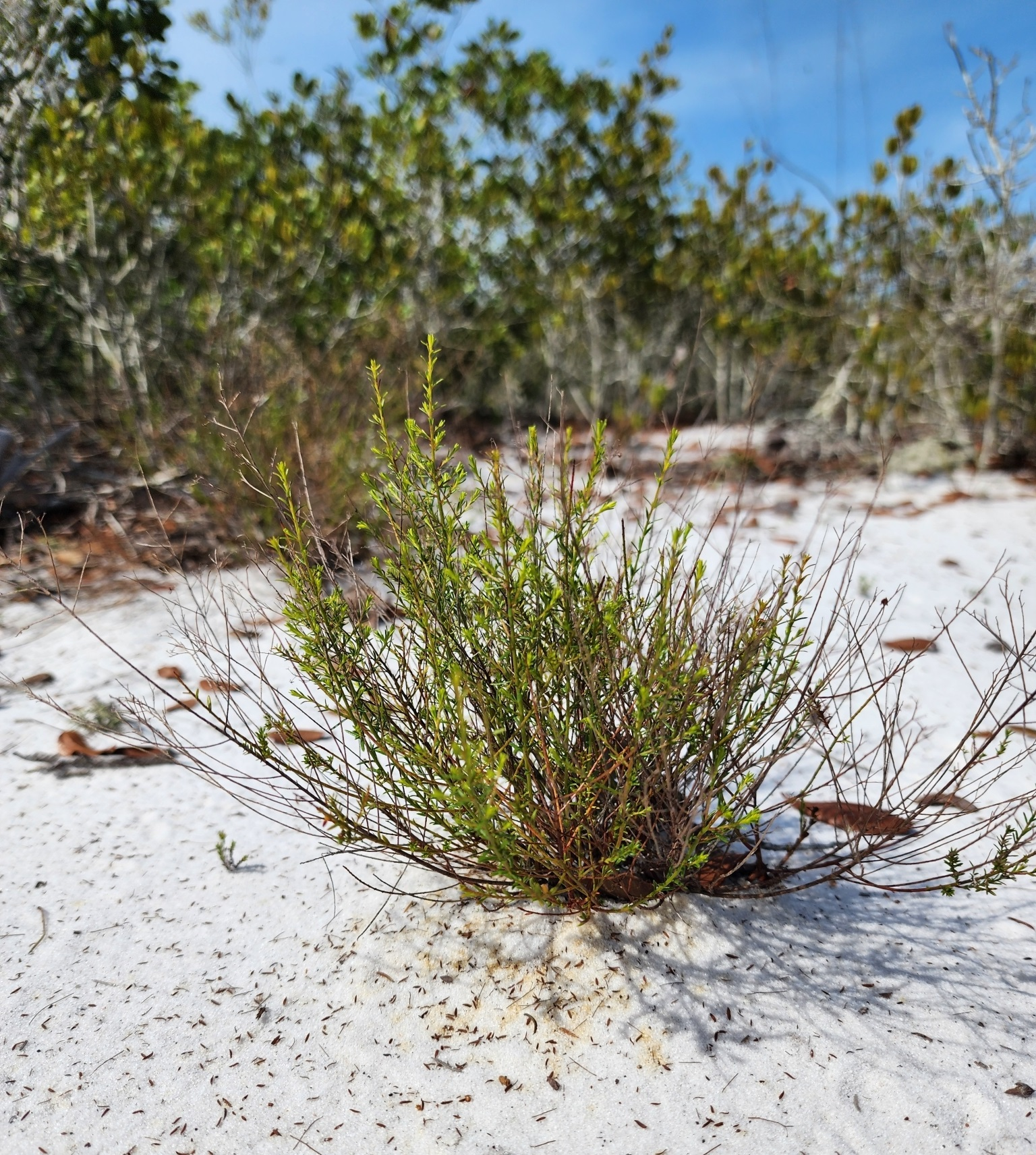

Conservation status
- Apparently Secure (NatureServe)

Scientific classification
- Kingdom: Plantae
- Clade: Tracheophytes
- Clade: Angiosperms
- Clade: Eudicots
- Clade: Rosids
- Order: Malvales
- Family: Cistaceae
- Genus: Lechea
- Species: L. deckertii

Binomial name
- Lechea deckertii Small

Synonyms
- Lechea myriophylla Small

= Lechea deckertii =

Species of flowering plant

Lechea deckertii, commonly called Deckert's pinweed, is a perennial herb or subshrub endemic to the U.S. states of Florida and Georgia.

== Habitat ==
Lechea deckertii occurs in exposed, sandy soils in the fire-dependent habitats of the Florida scrub and longleaf pine sandhill. However, it is most common in the southern portions of its habitat; L. deckertii is very rare in northern Florida and southern Georgia.

== Conservation ==
Despite its global listing, it is listed as critically imperiled in Georgia and vulnerable in Florida.
