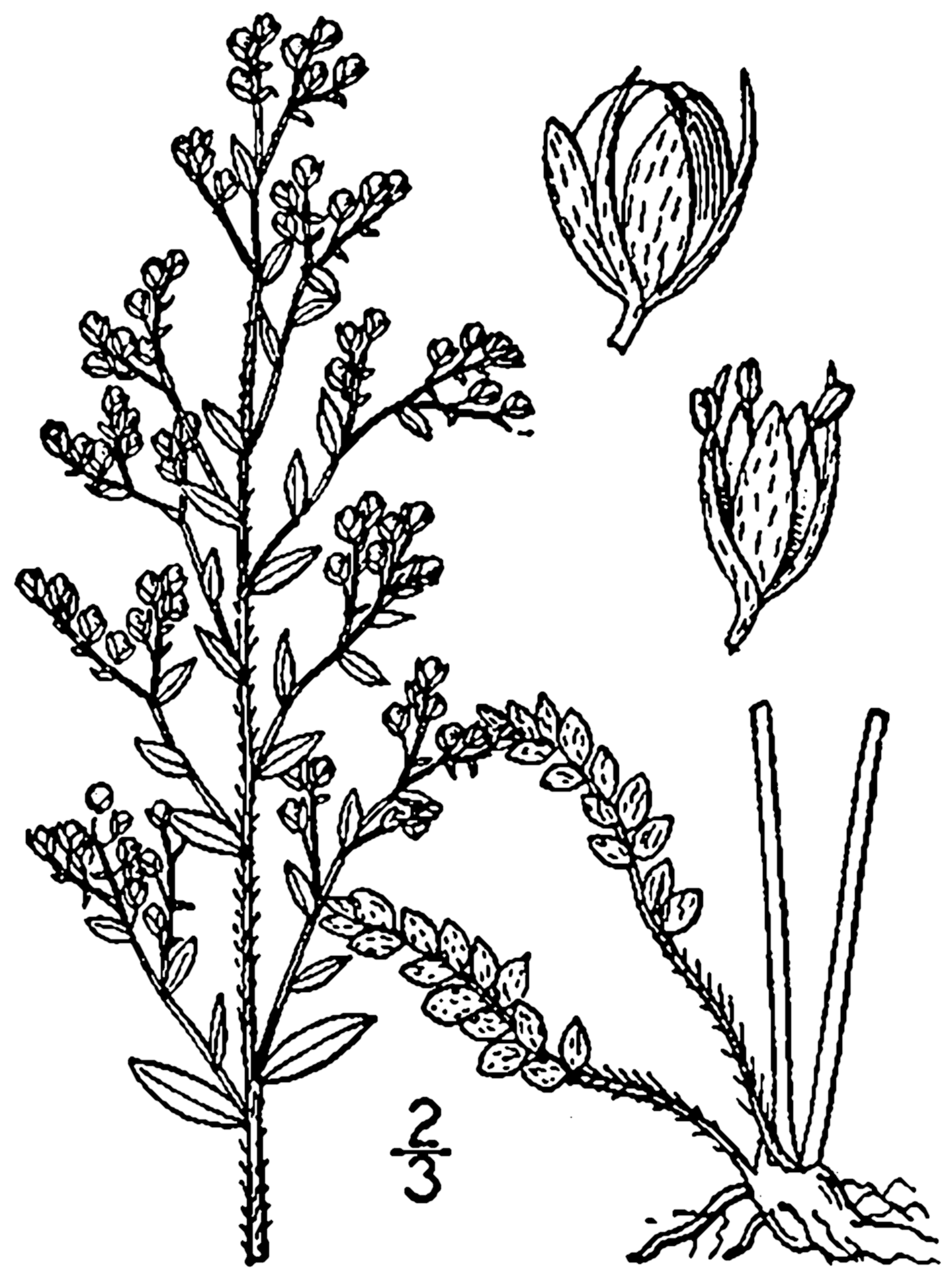

Scientific classification
- Kingdom: Plantae
- Clade: Tracheophytes
- Clade: Angiosperms
- Clade: Eudicots
- Clade: Rosids
- Order: Malvales
- Family: Cistaceae
- Genus: Lechea
- Species: L. minor

Binomial name
- Lechea minor L.

= Lechea minor =

Species of plant

Lechea minor, commonly known as thymeleaf pinweed, is a perennial forb native to the United States and Canada.

== Description ==
Lechea minor has a taproot and forms basal rosettes of procumbent, leafy stems later in the season. Early stems are erect, branching above, and covered with appressed or spreading hairs. Leaves are typically opposite, subopposite, or whorled below, and alternate above; winter rosettes often have whorled or subverticillate leaves. Inflorescences are scorpioid cymes or racemes, arranged in a panicle or thyrse. Flowers have five sepals (outer two linear, inner three elliptic to ovate), three reddish or maroon petals (shorter than sepals), 5–15 stamens, and three red, plumose stigmas. Capsules are ellipsoid, 1.2–1.7 mm long and 0.7–1 mm wide, usually containing three reddish-brown seeds about 1 mm long. Stems are 20–70 cm tall, with spreading to ascending branches. Leaves are 6–12 mm long, glabrous above, ciliate, and pubescent beneath, especially on the midrib and margins. Petioles are about 1 mm long.

== Distribution and habitat ==
Lechea minor is found from Massachusetts and Vermont west to southern Ontario and northern Indiana and south to central peninsular Florida and Louisiana. It is primarily found in the Atlantic Plain and around the Great Lakes. It grows in pine savannas, longleaf pine sandhills, pine-oak woodlands, and sandy disturbed places.

== Ecology ==
It flowers from July through August and fruits from August to October. It forms a soil seed bank that can persist for several years, and populations have shown the ability to persist through repeated disturbance from annual prescribed burning.
