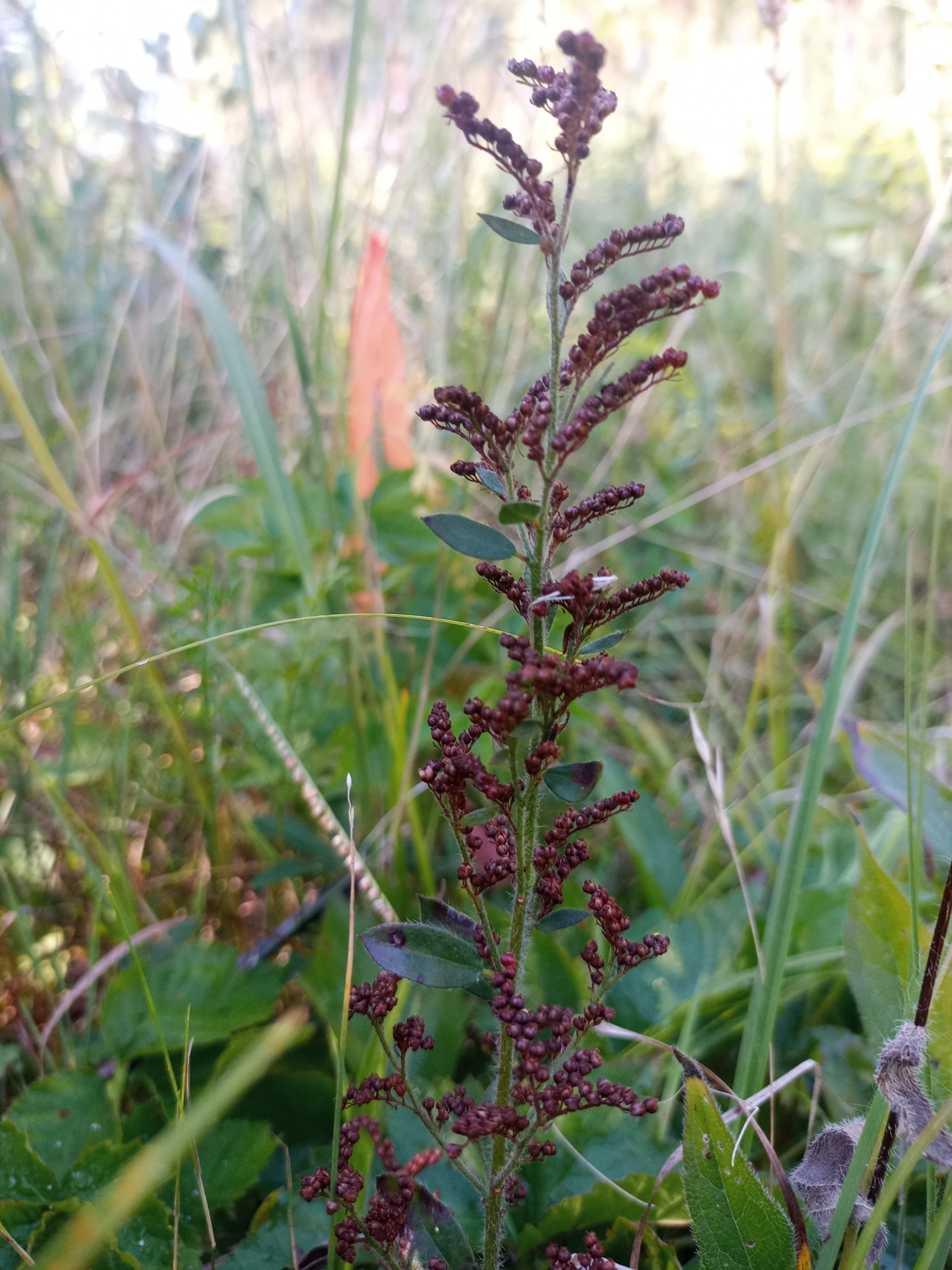

Scientific classification
- Kingdom: Plantae
- Clade: Tracheophytes
- Clade: Angiosperms
- Clade: Eudicots
- Clade: Rosids
- Order: Malvales
- Family: Cistaceae
- Genus: Lechea
- Species: L. mucronata

Binomial name
- Lechea mucronata Raf.

= Lechea mucronata =

Species of plant

Lechea mucronata, commonly known as hairy pinweed, is a perennial forb. It is native to North America and is found from New Hampshire west to Michigan and Oklahoma, south to central peninsular Florida, Texas, and northern Mexico. It grows in open dry habitats, dunes, dry hammocks, woodlands, and longleaf pine sandhills.
