= Albion Reed Hodgdon =

American botanist, plant taxonomist and herbarium curator

Albion Reed Hodgdon (November 1, 1909, Boothbay Harbor, Maine – December 31, 1976, Rochester, New Hampshire) was an American botanist, plant taxonomist, herbarium curator, and leading authority on the flora of New England.

Hodgdon graduated from the University of New Hampshire in 1932 with a B.S. in botany and in 1934 with an M.S. in botany. He graduated from Harvard University in 1936 with a Ph.D. in botany. His doctoral thesis, supervised by Merritt Lyndon Fernald, is entitled "A Monographic Study of the Genus Lechea". With Lyman B. Smith, Hogdon collected plants in Virginia, the Florida Keys, and Cuba in 1936 and in Kentucky in 1937.

... he traveled extensively: to Tennessee and Michigan while pursuing his doctoral dissertation; to Cuba in 1936, prodigiously collecting for the Gray Herbarium in a post-doctoral assignment at Harvard; to Kentucky in 1937; to Mexico and California in 1938; and to Alaska in 1952. He traveled to the Caribbean on vacations in the 1960s with his wife, Audrey, to Great Britain in 1964, Scotland and Ireland in 1966 with family, to Europe in 1968, to Puerto Rico where he visited his student, David Conant, in 1973, and later to the Galápagos Islands (Bogle 1978).

In 1936 Hodgdon joined the faculty of the University of New Hampshire as an instructor and was promoted in 1941 to associate professor and eventually to full professor. He was the chair of the botany department from 1947 to 1967, when he retired.

He was the editor-in-chief of the journal Rhodora from 1962 until 1974. He was the president of the New England Botanical Club from 1974 to 1976. As curator of the University of New Hampshire's herbarium, he created a huge botanical collection, "surpassed perhaps only by the one at Harvard." The herbarium was renamed the Albion R. Hodgdon Herbarium in his honor.

One of "Doc" Hodgdon's major achievements was the development of the University of New Hampshire Herbarium, expanding considerably from the original 1,500 specimens moved to Durham from Hanover in 1892. ... When he retired, the UNH Herbarium housed over 118,000 specimens, including ca. 82,000 vascular plants, 36,000 marine algae, and a small number of bryophytes, lichens, and fungi.

In 1941 he married Audrey McKown (1908–1988). They had two sons and a daughter.

== Selected publications ==
- Hodgdon, A. R. (1938). "A taxonomic study of Lechea". Contributions from the Gray Herbarium of Harvard University (121): 29–131. JSTOR 41764442.
- Hodgdon, A. R.; Giguere, P.; Krochmal, S. B.; Riel, A. (1952). "New Potamogeton Records in New Hampshire". Rhodora. 54 (646): 237–246. JSTOR 23304318.
- Hodgdon, A. R.; Pike, Radcliffe (1961). "An Ecological Interpretation of Rhododendron Colonies in Maine and New Hampshire". Rhodora. 63 (747): 61–70. JSTOR 23306259.
- Hodgdon, A. R.; Steele, Frederic (1962). "Glandularity in Rubus Allegheniensis Porter". Rhodora. 64 (758): 161–168. JSTOR 23306538.
- Pike, Radcliffe B.; Hodgdon, Albion R. (1962). "Changes in Flora of the Machias Seal Islands". Rhodora. 64 (760): 340–346. JSTOR 23306665.
- Steele, Frederic; Hodgdon, A. R. (1963). "Hybridization of Rubus Hispidus and R. Setosus". Rhodora. 65 (763): 262–270. JSTOR 23306603.
- Pike, Radcliffe B.; Hodgdon, Albion R. (1963). "The Flora of the Wolf Islands New Brunswick Part I". Rhodora. 65 (761): 82–96. JSTOR 23306734.
- Hodgdon, Albion R.; Pike, Radcliffe B. (1964). "Flora of the Wolf Islands, New Brunswick: Part 2 Some Phytogeographic Considerations". Rhodora. 66 (766): 140–155. JSTOR 23306462.
- Hodgdon, A. R.; Hogdon, A. R.; Steele, Frederic (1966). "Rubus Subgenus Eubatus in New England: A Conspectus". Rhodora. 68 (776): 474–513. JSTOR 23311618.
- Hodgdon, A. R.; Pike, Radcliffe B. (1969). "Floristic Comparison of Three Bird Islands in the Gulf of Maine". Rhodora. 71 (788): 510–523. JSTOR 23311686.
- Steele, F. L.; Hodgdon, A. R. (1973). "Two Interesting Plants on Mt. Cardigan, Orange, New Hampshire". Rhodora. 75 (801): 155–157. JSTOR 23311800.
- Hodgdon, A. R.; Eastman, Lesley M. (1973). "Chimaphila Maculata (L.) Pursh in Maine and New Hampshire". Rhodora. 75 (801): 162–165. JSTOR 23311802.
- McCain, John; Pike, R. B.; Hodgdon, A. R. (1973). "The Vascular Flora of Kent Island, Grand Manan, New Brunswick". Rhodora. 75 (802): 311–322. JSTOR 23311839.
