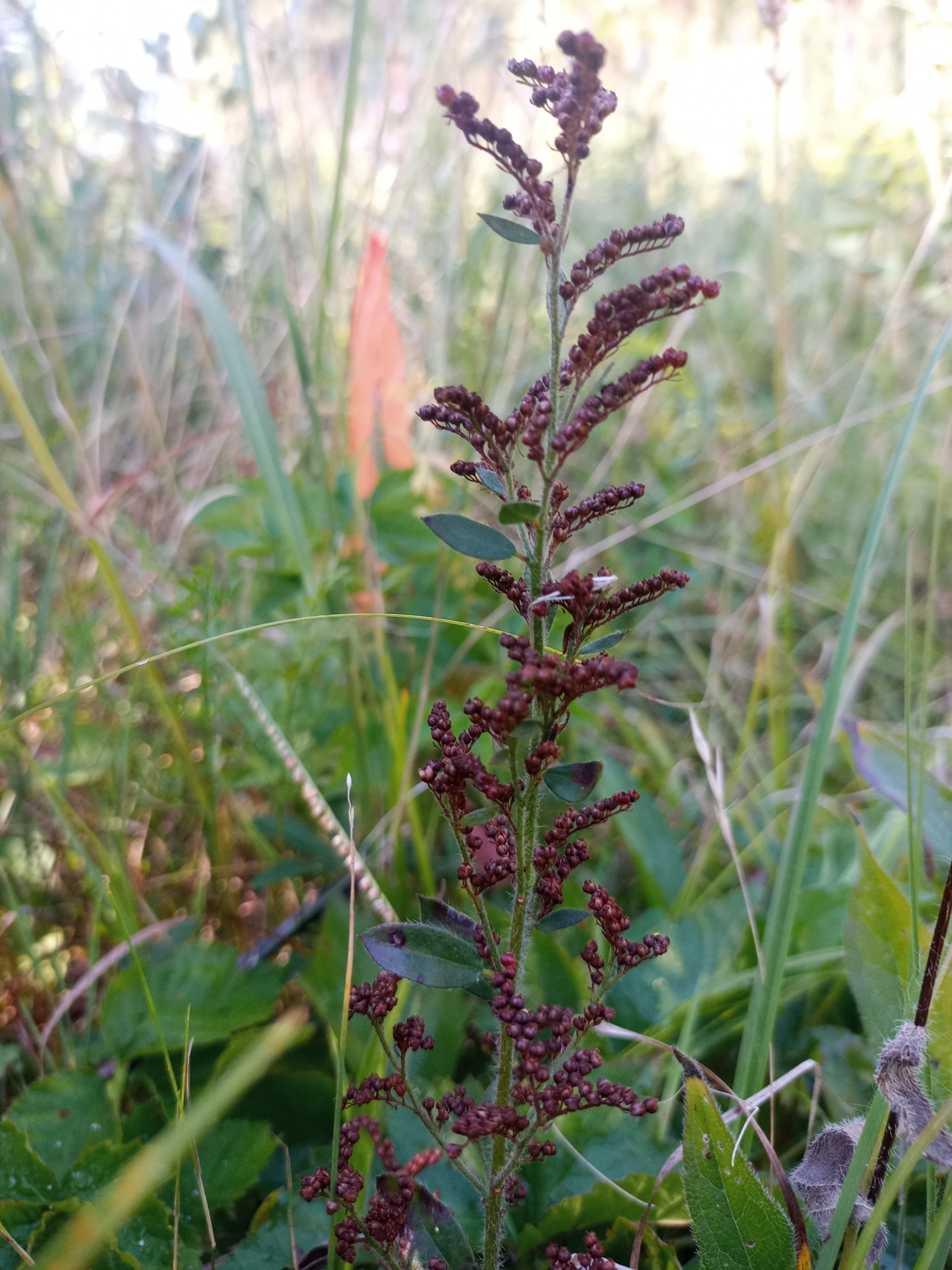
- Lechea mucronata

Scientific classification
- Kingdom: Plantae
- Clade: Embryophytes
- Clade: Tracheophytes
- Clade: Spermatophytes
- Clade: Angiosperms
- Clade: Eudicots
- Clade: Rosids
- Order: Malvales
- Family: Cistaceae
- Genus: Lechea; Kalm (1753)

Synonyms
- Gaura Lam. (1792), nom. illeg.; Horanthes Raf. (1838); Lechidium Spach (1837)

= Lechea =

Genus of flowering plants

Lechea (pinweed) is a genus in the family Cistaceae of the order Malvales. The genus contains about 18 species referred to as "pinweeds" primarily in eastern North America. Most are low-growing herbs with narrow leaves and many small flowers that resemble pinheads.

Linnaeus named the genus Lechea for Swedish botanist Johan Leche (1704–1764), who taught in Finland and is regarded as the father of Finnish meteorology and space research, based on his documentation of the northern lights and early measurements of air temperature in collaboration with Anders Celsius.

== Species ==
18 species are accepted.

- Lechea cernua Small
- Lechea cubensis Legg.
- Lechea deckertii Small
- Lechea divaricata Shuttlew. ex Britton
- Lechea intermedia Legg. ex Britton
- Lechea lakelae Wilbur
- Lechea maritima Legg. ex Britton
- Lechea mensalis Hodgdon
- Lechea minor L.
- Lechea mucronata Raf.
- Lechea pulchella Raf.
- Lechea racemulosa Michx.
- Lechea san-sabeana (Buckley) Hodgdon
- Lechea sessiliflora Raf.
- Lechea stricta Legg. ex Britton
- Lechea tenuifolia Michx.
- Lechea torreyi (Chapm.) Legg. ex Britton
- Lechea tripetala (Moc. & Sessé ex Dunal) Britton

== Gallery ==
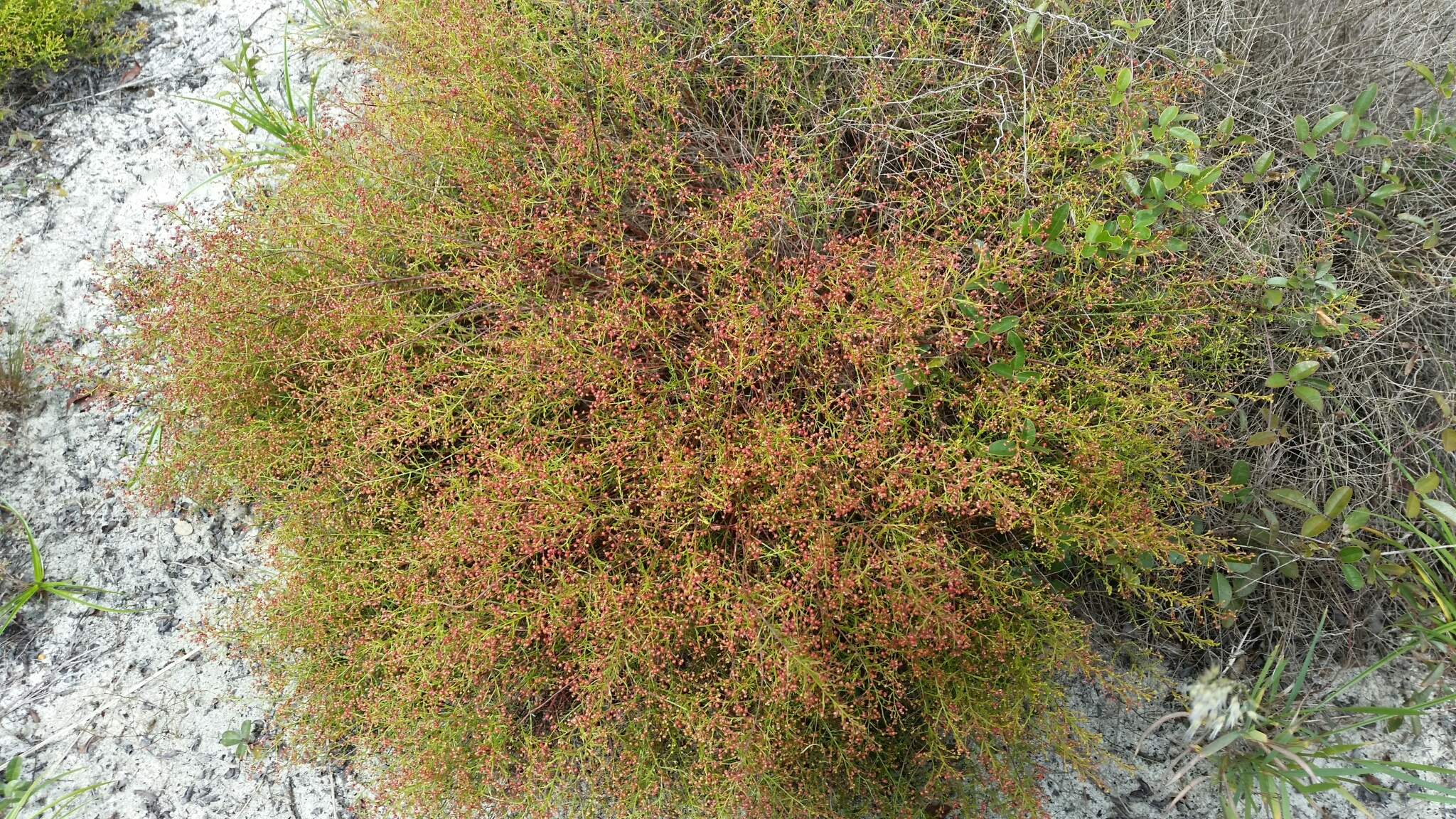
Lechea deckertii

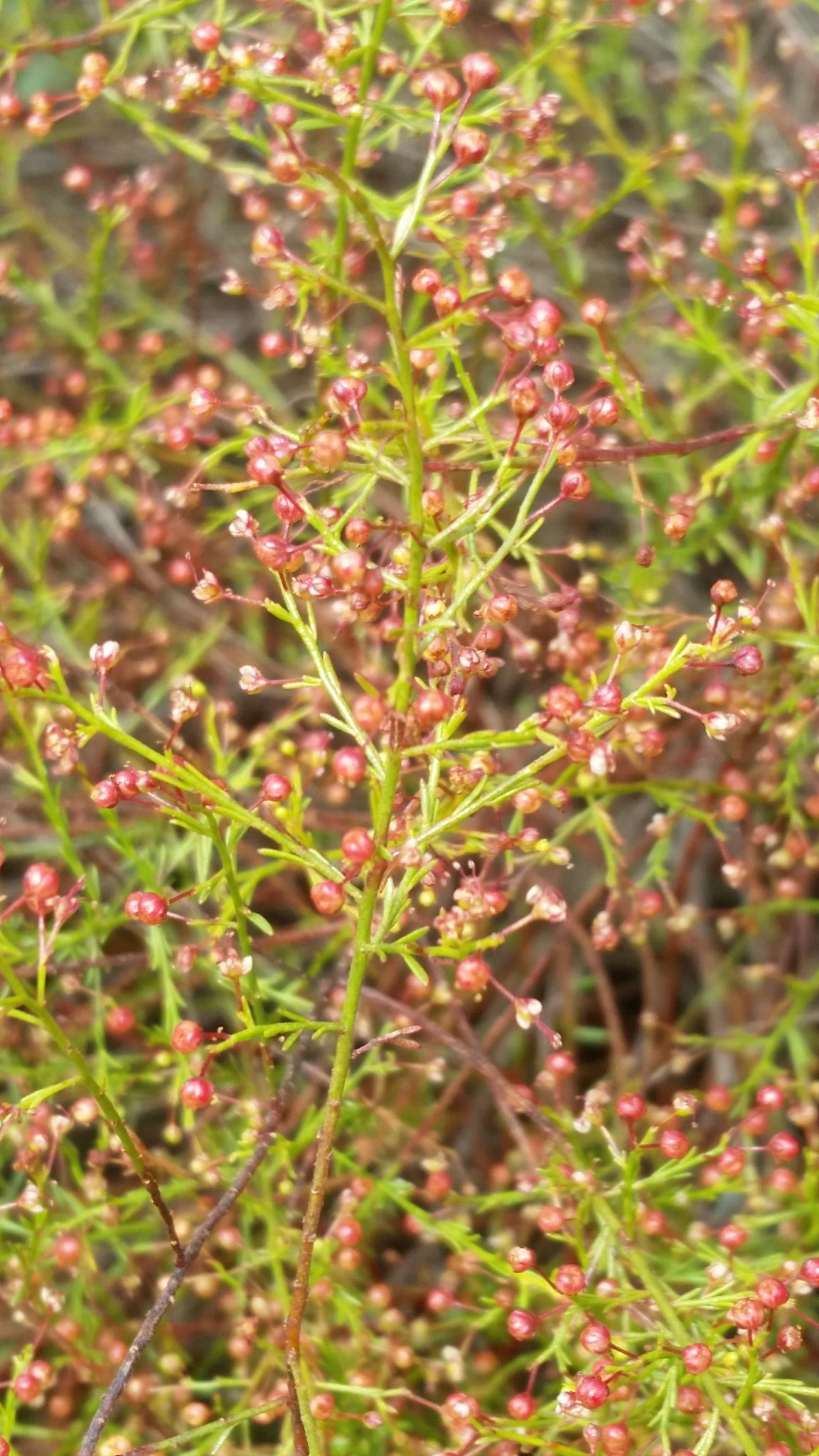
Lechea deckertii

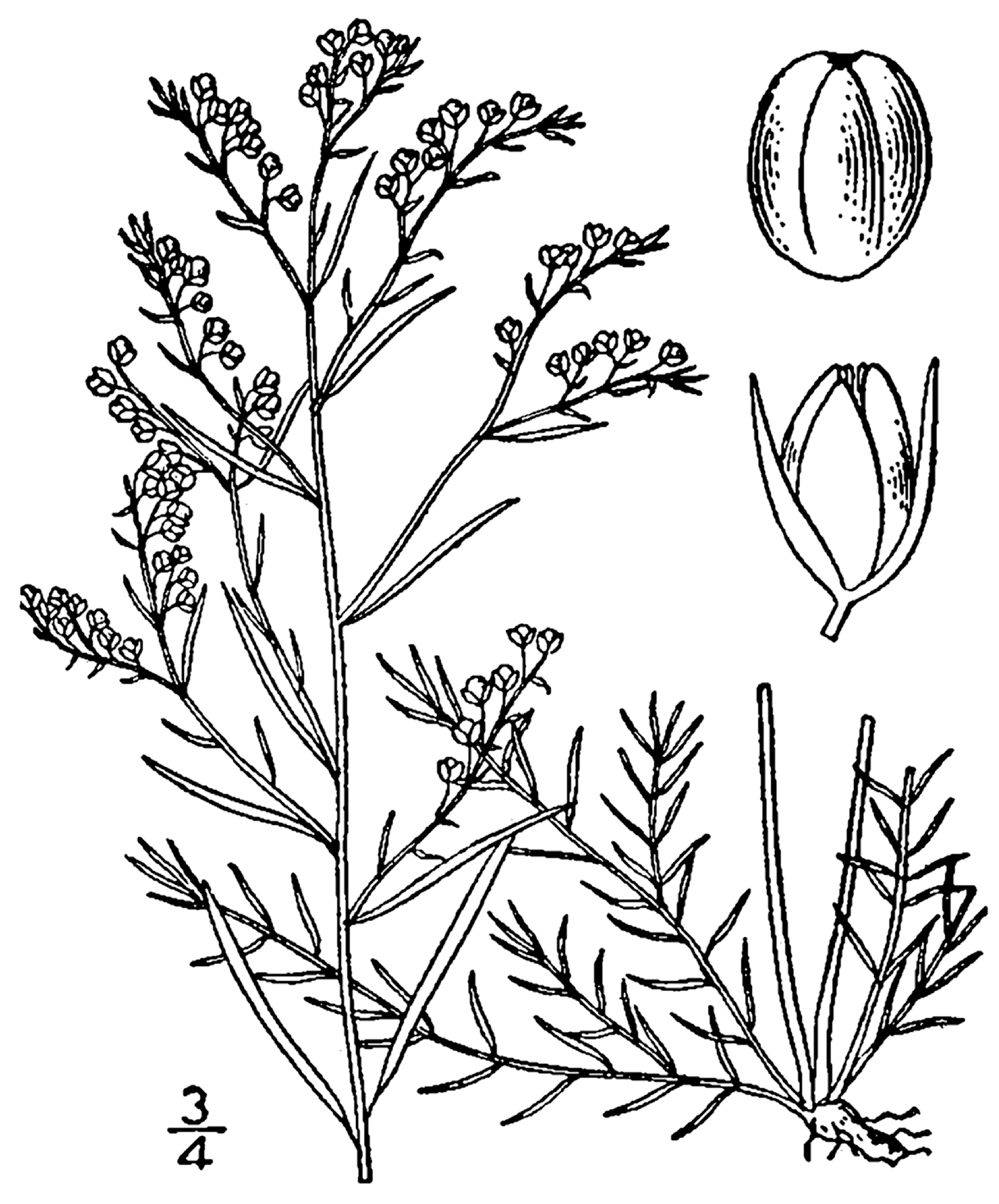
Lechea tenuifolia Michx. narrowleaf pinweed

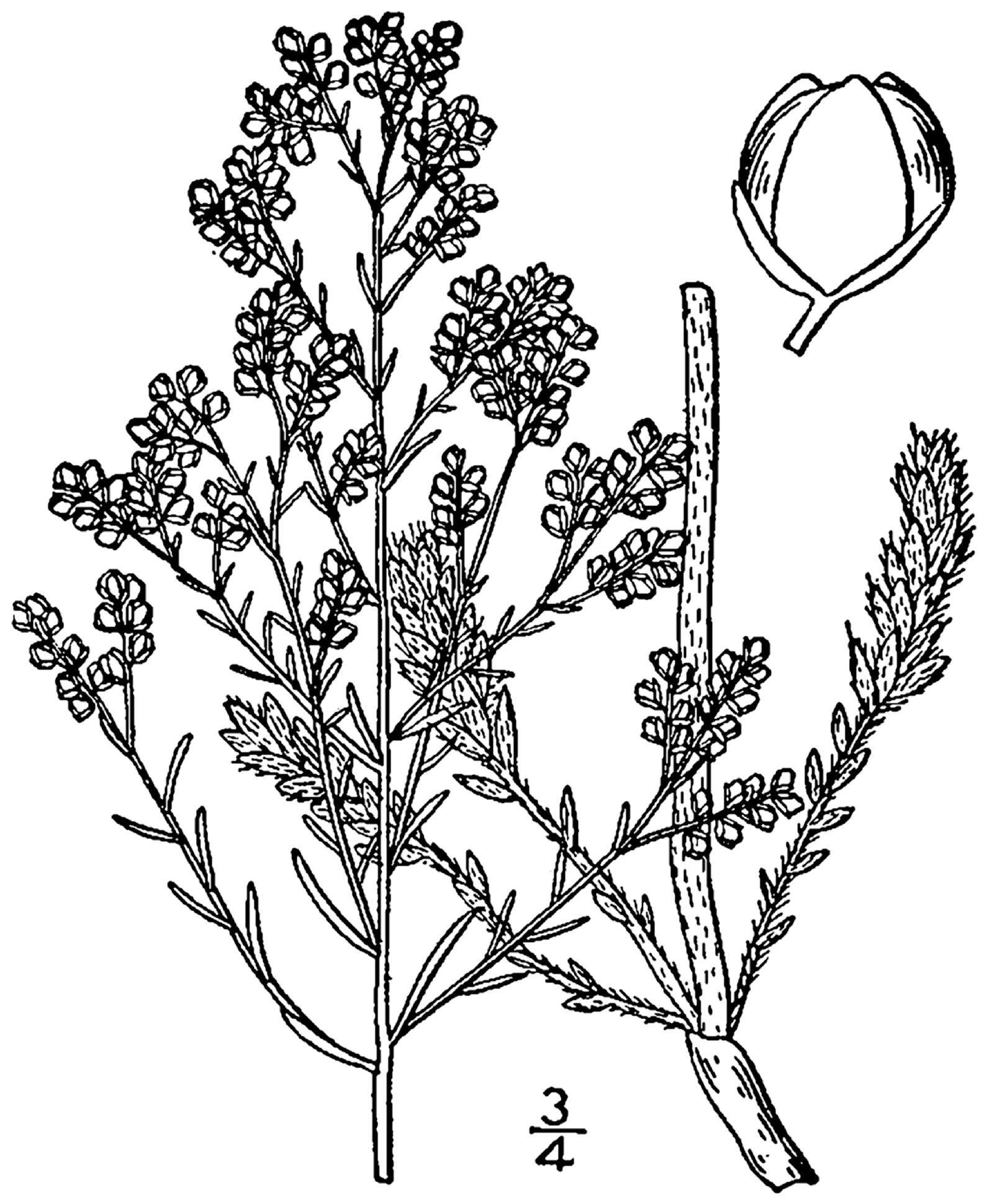
Lechea maritima

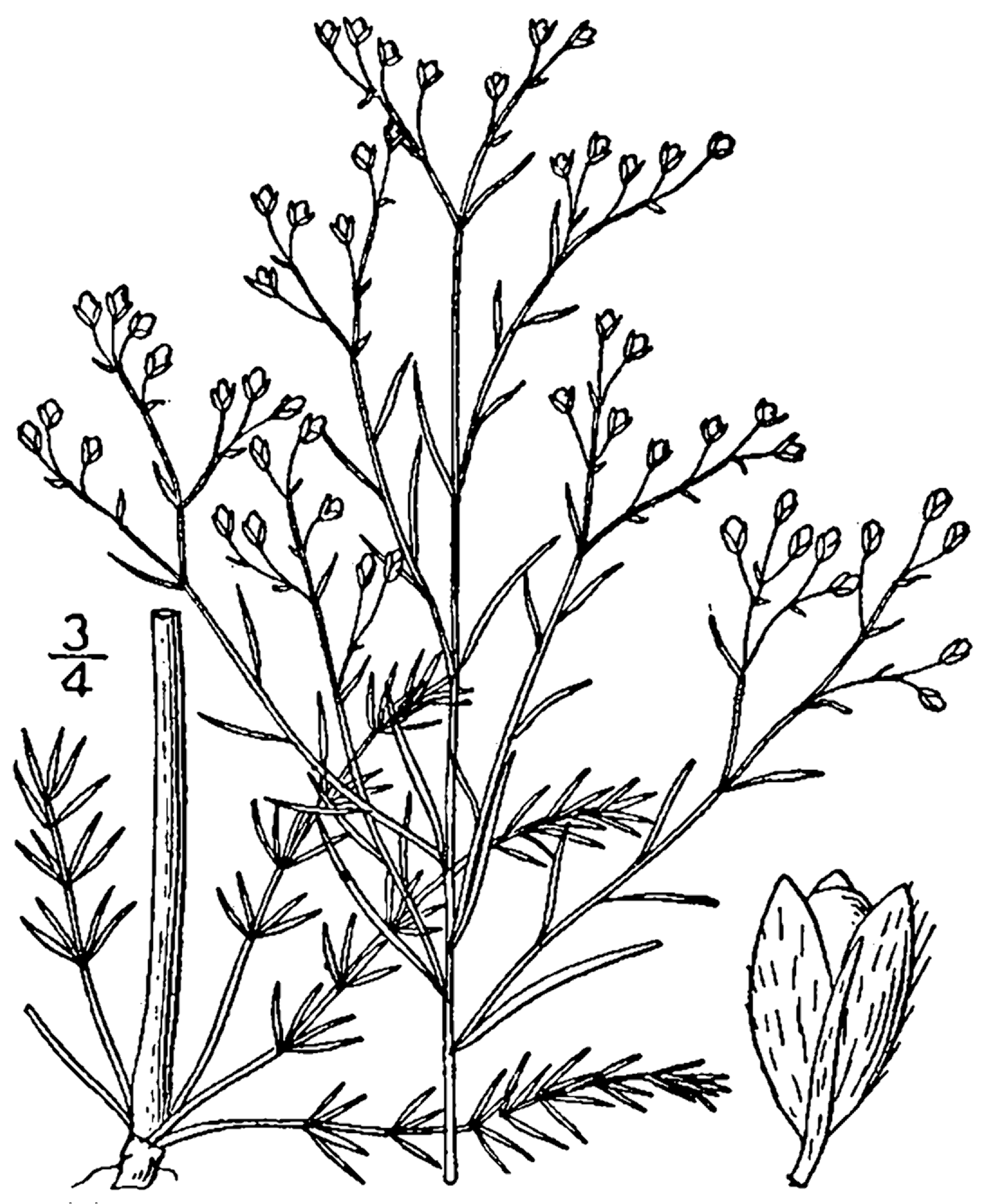
Lechea pulchella
