= Johan Grysselius =

- Born: November 22, 1738; Gällersta, Sweden
- Died: April 8, 1788 (aged 49); Tornio, Finland
- Education: Uppsala University; University of Turku
- Known for: Criticism of swallow hibernation theory Promotion of vaccination Founding spas and pharmacy
- Scientific career
- Fields: Medicine, Natural history
- Workplaces: Västerbotten
- Doctoral advisor: Carl Linnaeus, Johan Leche

Johan Grysselius (22 November 1738 – 8 April 1788) was a Swedish physician and naturalist who was a student of Carolus Linnaeus and Johan Leche. He wrote a thesis criticising the then existing idea that swallows spent winter under lakes.

Grysselius was born in Gällersta to farmers Olof Gustafsson and Kerstin Jönsdotter. He studied at Örebro and graduated from Strängnäs Gymnasium in 1751–1752 before going to Uppsala University. He then founded a spa in 1761 and promoted the use of vaccinations. In 1762 he went to the University of Turku and wrote a thesis under Johan Leche in 1764. This was on the theory of hibernation of swallows underwater during winter ("De commoratione hybernali et peregrinationibus hirundinum"). Leche and Grysselius demonstrated that this idea was incorrect. He received a philosophy degree in 1765 and moved to Uppsala to study medicine under Carl von Linné. He defended his doctoral thesis in 1768 and became a physician at Västerbotten. He established a pharmacy in 1787 and a spa in Piitime in 1769. He died in Tornio.
