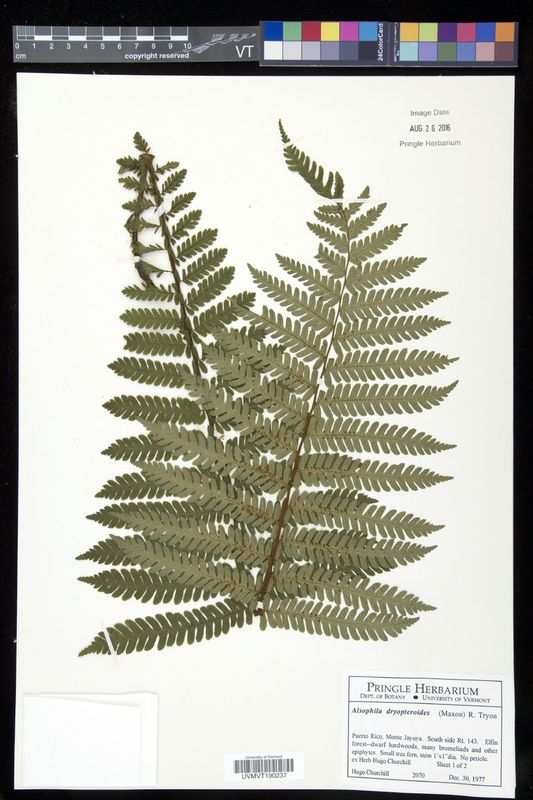

Scientific classification
- Kingdom: Plantae
- Clade: Embryophytes
- Clade: Tracheophytes
- Division: Polypodiophyta
- Class: Polypodiopsida
- Order: Cyatheales
- Family: Cyatheaceae
- Genus: Alsophila
- Species: A. dryopteroides

Binomial name
- Alsophila dryopteroides (Maxon) R.M.Tryon

Synonyms
- Cyathea dryopteroides Maxon; Alsophila aminta D.S.Conant; Alsophila amintae D.S.Conant

= Alsophila dryopteroides =

Species of fern

Alsophila dryopteroides, synonym Cyathea dryopteroides, is a tree fern native to Puerto Rico, where it grows in shaded areas and cloud forests at an altitude of 1000–1200 m. The erect trunk may be 1.3 m tall and approximately 5 cm in diameter. Fronds are pinnate and up to 1.6 m long. The rachis is often purplish brown and covered with scales, usually on the underside. The scales range in colour from golden brown to bicoloured (pale with darker margins). Sori occur along each side of the pinnule midvein and indusia are cup-like.

== Taxonomy ==
The epithets used in the scientific name of this species are confused, as of July 2021. The species was first described by William Ralph Maxon in 1925 as Cyathea dryopteroides. It was transferred to the genus Alsophila in 1970 by Rolla M. Tryon as Alsophila dryopteroides. In 1981, David S. Conant said that the epithet dryopteroides was incorrectly formed, and under Article 73.8 of the version of the botanical code then current, the epithet should be corrected to dryopteridoides, so that the names in Cyathea and Alsophila were Cyathea dryopteridoides and Alsophila dryopteridoides. However, the latter name had already been used by Domin in 1929, so that Alsophila dryopteridoides (Maxon) R.M.Tryon was an illegitimate later homonym of Alsophila dryopteridoides Domin. Accordingly, Conant published the replacement name Alsophila aminta. The International Plant Names Index (IPNI) accepts the legitimacy of Conant's analysis, noting that aminta is a noun in opposition. Plants of the World Online and World Ferns retain the original dryopteroides. As aminta honours Aminta Kitfield Conant, World Ferns, along with other sources, has changed aminta to amintae – epithets honouring people are normally in the genitive. Thus, as of July 2021, two main sets of names are in use:

	IPNI	Plants of the World Online & World Ferns
Accepted name in Alsophila:	Alsophila aminta D.S.Conant replacement name	Alsophila dryopteroides (Maxon) R.M.Tryon
Name in Cyathea:	Cyathea dryopteridoides Maxon	Cyathea dryopteroides Maxon
Other synonym:		Alsophila aminta D.S.Conant or Alsophila amintae D.S.Conant
