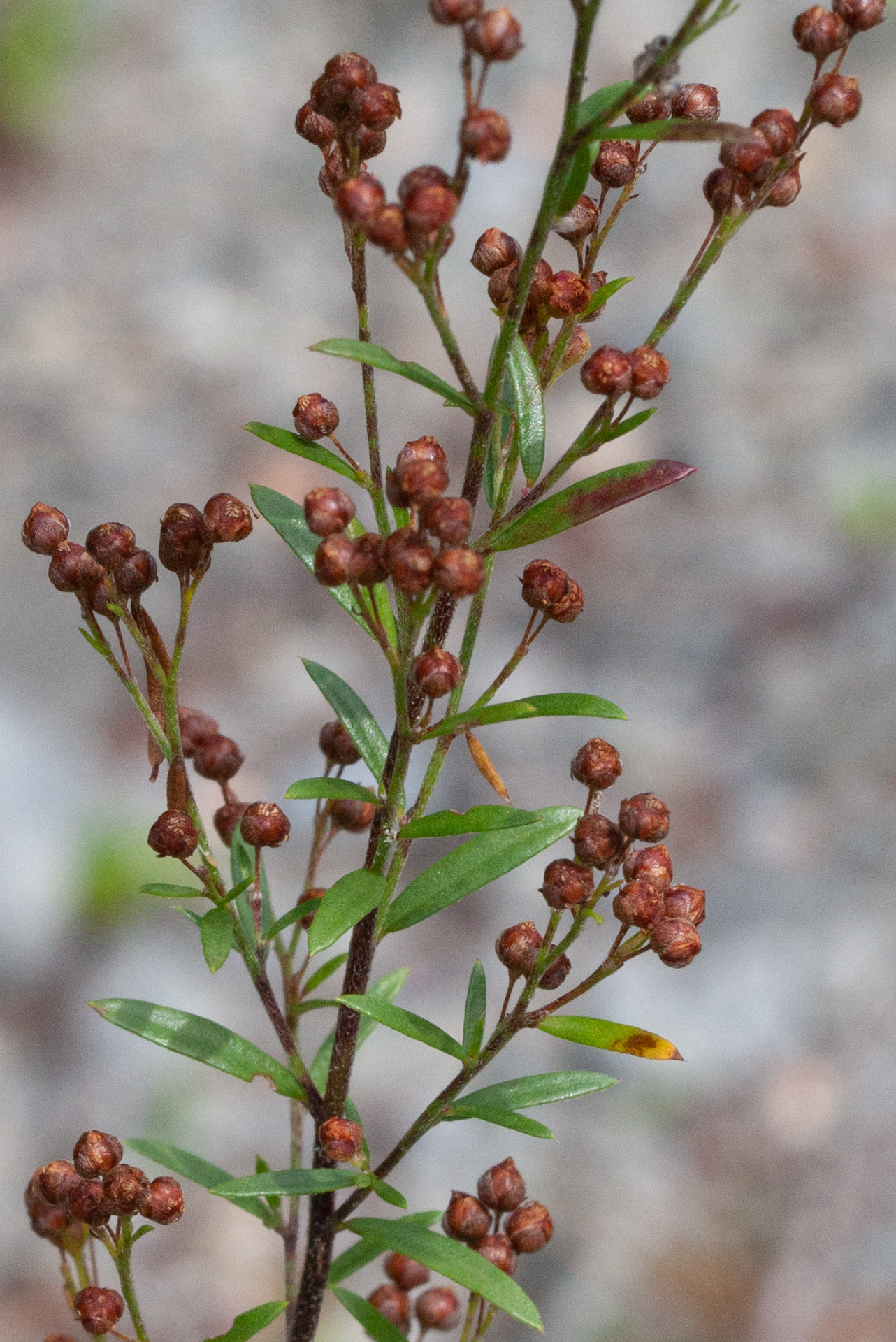

Conservation status
- Secure (NatureServe)

Scientific classification
- Kingdom: Plantae
- Clade: Tracheophytes
- Clade: Angiosperms
- Clade: Eudicots
- Clade: Rosids
- Order: Malvales
- Family: Cistaceae
- Genus: Lechea
- Species: L. intermedia

Binomial name
- Lechea intermedia Legg. ex Britton

= Lechea intermedia =

Species of plant

Lechea intermedia is a species of pinweed in the family Cistaceae (rock-roses). Common names for this species include large-pod pinweed, large-podded pinweed, intermediate pinweed, and round-fruited pinweed.

== Range ==
The native range of Lechea intermedia is central and eastern Canada to northcentral and eastern United States.

== Habitat ==
The species is seemingly adaptable, capable of persisting in a wide variety of open-canopy habitats throughout its range.

== Taxonomy ==
Lechea intermedia contains the following varieties:

- Lechea intermedia var. juniperina — Maine pinweed (léchéa faux-genévrier)
- Lechea intermedia var. depauperata — impoverished pinweed (léchéa appauvri)
- Lechea intermedia var. laurentiana — Laurentian pinweed (léchéa de la vallée du Saint-Laurent)
- Lechea intermedia var. intermedia — large-pod pinweed (léchéa intermédiaire)
