= New England Botanical Society =

US learned society for botany founded in 1896

- Abbreviation: NEBS
- Formation: 1896
- Founder: William Gilson Farlow
- Type: Nonprofit organization
- Location: Cambridge, Massachusetts, United States
- Region served: New England
- Fields: Botany
- Publication: Rhodora
- Website: rhodora.org
- Formerly called: New England Botanical Club (until 2021)

The New England Botanical Society (NEBS) is an American nonprofit organization to promote the study of plants of North America, particularly flora of New England. With both amateur and professional scientists as members, the NEBS was founded in 1896 as the New England Botanical Club, changing its name to the present form in 2021.

The NEBS has published the peer-reviewed journal Rhodora since 1899 and maintains vascular and nonvascular herbaria and a 600-volume library at the Harvard University Herbaria. It hosts monthly meetings and confers publication and research awards. Its founder and first president was Harvard University botanist William Gilson Farlow.
