= Barkåkra Church =

- Barkåkra kyrka
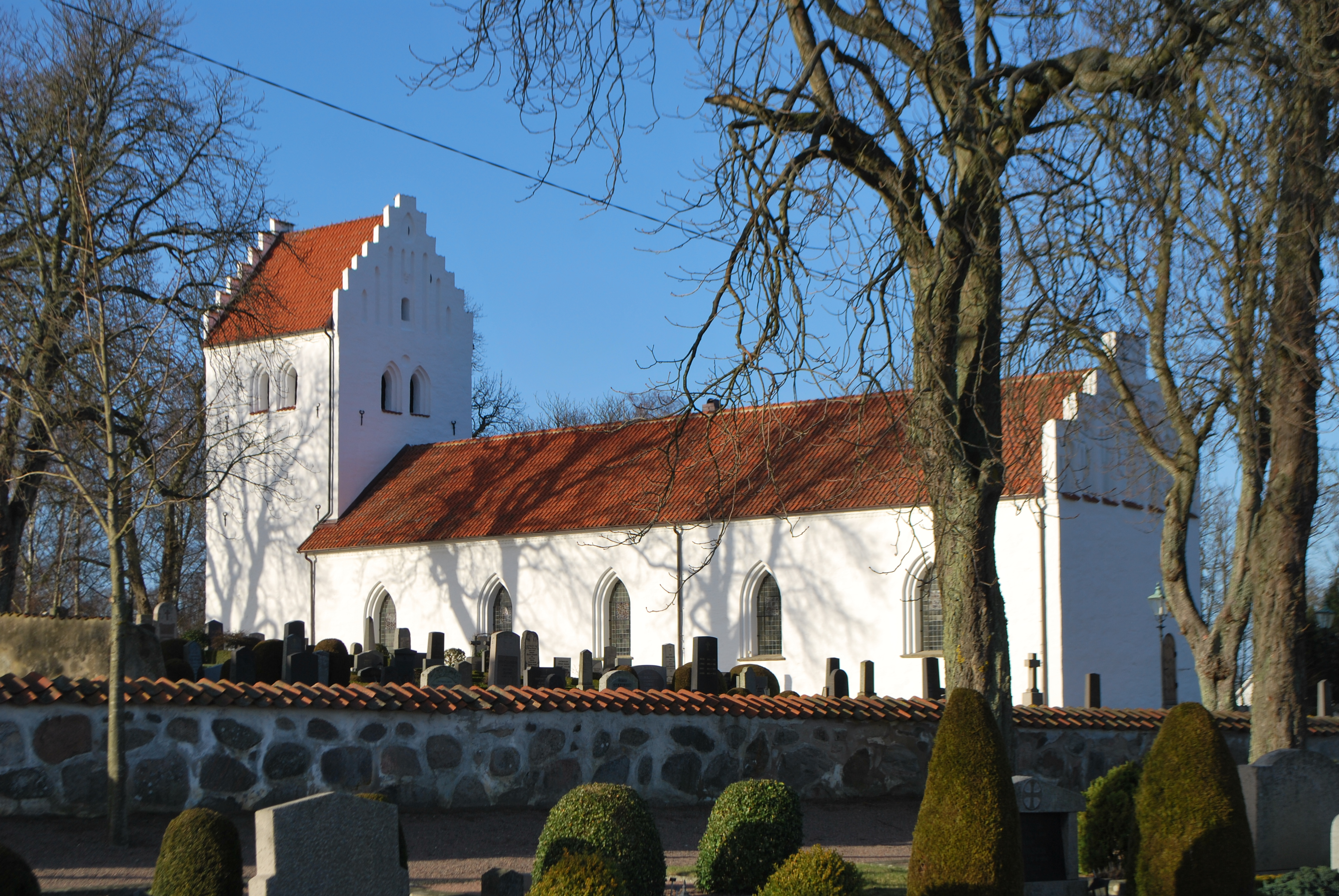
- Barkåkra Church

- 56°17′44″N 12°50′07″E
- Country: Sweden
- Denomination: Church of Sweden

Administration
- Diocese: Lund

Barkåkra Church (Swedish: Barkåkra kyrka) is a church in Barkåkra, Ängelholm Municipality in the Swedish province Skåne (Scania). One of the oldest churches in the area, it dates from the 12th century but has been heavily rebuilt, partially during the Middle Ages and partially during the 19th and 20th centuries.

== History ==
The church was built at the end of the 12th century, and is one of the oldest churches in the area. It was possibly built on a pre-Christian sacred site. Because the church has been successively rebuilt during the centuries, today only some of the walls of the nave are preserved from this first building period. The church was enlarged during the 14th century, and at the same time the church tower was built and a church porch built in front of the northern entrance. During the 15th century the interior was rebuilt as the church ceiling replaced with the currently visible vaults. Somewhat later during the same century another church porch was built in front of the southern entrance.

Substantive reconstruction was also done during the 19th century. A north transept was built in 1802, and a sacristy in 1826. The medieval southern church porch was demolished in 1861, and during a renovation in 1924–25 the sacristy was also demolished. During the same renovation, fragments of medieval murals were discovered in the church. The stained glass windows were installed in the 1960s and 70s, and designed by Randi Fischer and Ralph Bergholtz.

== Furnishings ==
The oldest item in the church is the baptismal font, which probably dates from the construction of the church. It's comparable in style to baptismal fonts from the same time found on Jutland. The pulpit of the church dates from the 17th century and has wooden reliefs depicting the Four Evangelists. The altarpiece is from 1737 and made by an artisan from Helsingborg; its central piece is an oil painting showing the Last Supper, flanked by carved wooden columns and statuettes of Moses and Jesus. The pews are largely from 1754. A later addition is the triumphal cross, made in 1940. The church also contains a plaque in memory of 31 people who died in an aircraft accident nearby in 1964.
