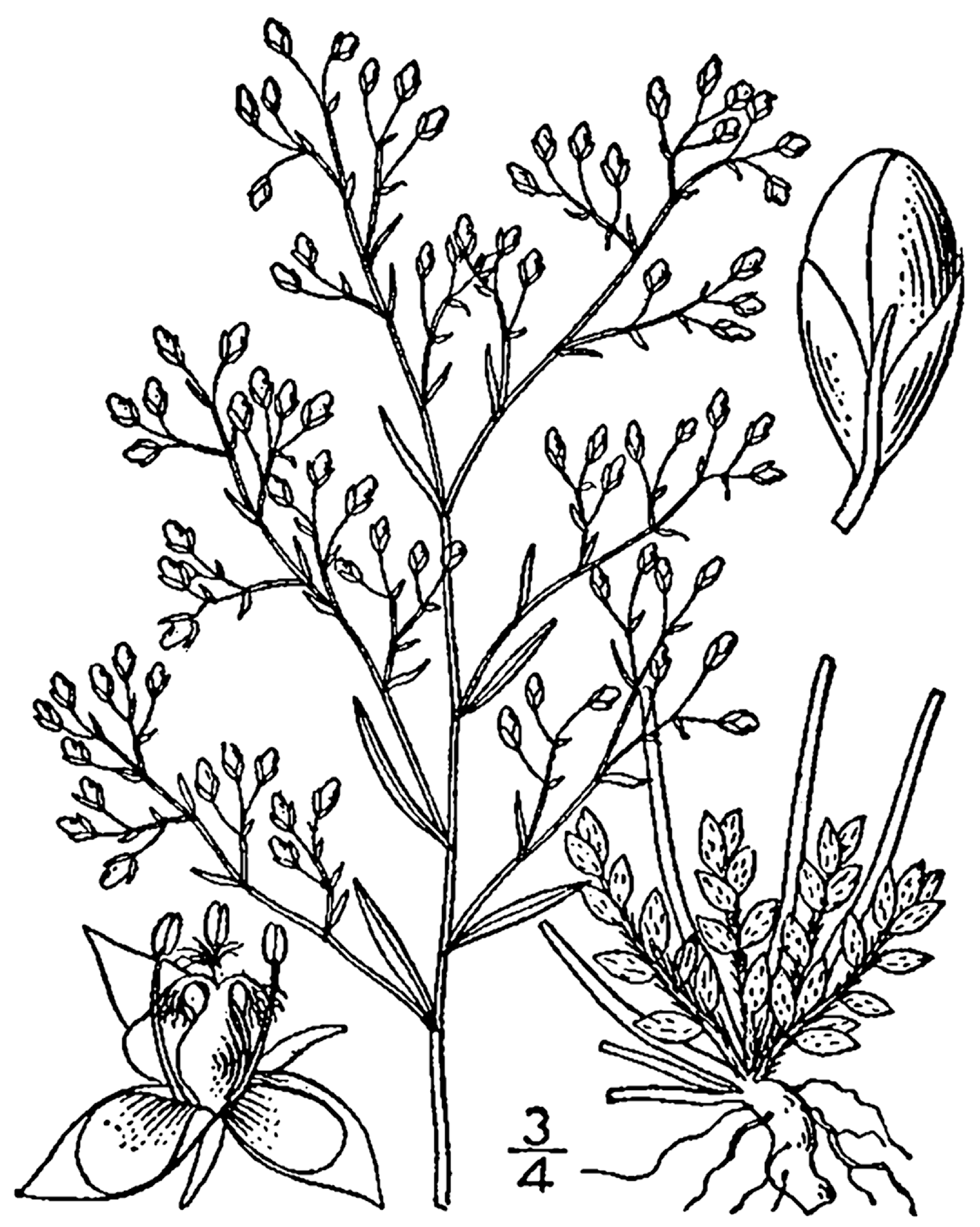
- 1913 Illustration

Conservation status
- Secure (NatureServe)

Scientific classification
- Kingdom: Plantae
- Clade: Embryophytes
- Clade: Tracheophytes
- Clade: Spermatophytes
- Clade: Angiosperms
- Clade: Eudicots
- Clade: Rosids
- Order: Malvales
- Family: Cistaceae
- Genus: Lechea
- Species: L. racemulosa

Binomial name
- Lechea racemulosa Michx.

= Lechea racemulosa =

Species of flowering plant

Lechea racemulosa, common name Illinois pinweed, is a perennial plant native to the United States.

== Conservation status in the United States ==
While considered globally secure, it is listed as a special concern and believed extirpated in Connecticut, as endangered in Indiana and rare in New York State.
