= William Henry Leggett =

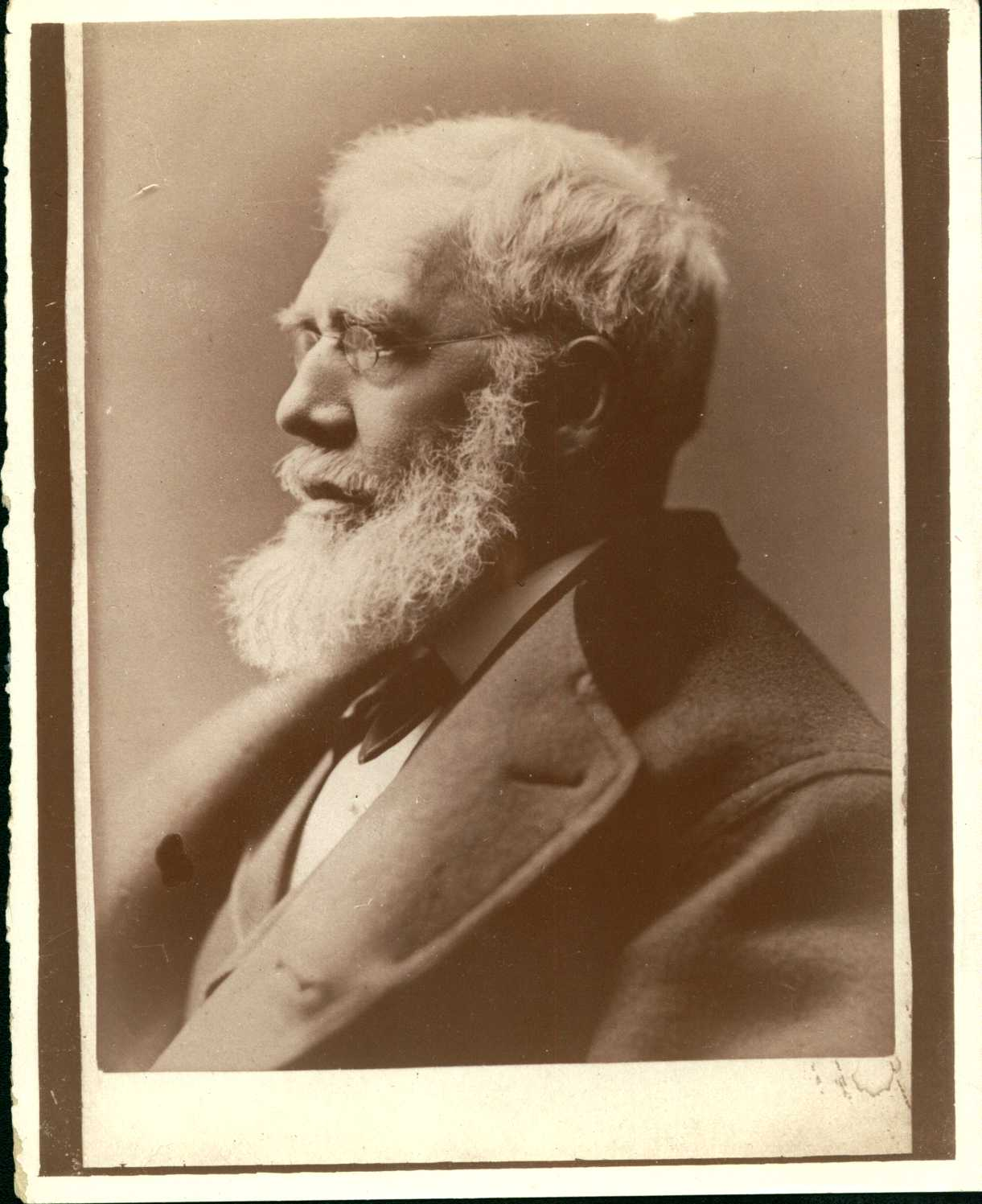

William Henry Leggett (February 24, 1816 – April 11, 1882) was a botanist and journalist, who founded the Torrey Botanical Bulletin.

== Biography ==
He was born February 24, 1816, in Manhattan, New York City. He graduated from Columbia College in 1837. He founded the Torrey Botanical Bulletin and was its editor and publisher from 1870 till 1880. He died on April 11, 1882, in Manhattan, New York City.
