= Rhodora (journal) =

Journal of the New England Botanical Society

- Discipline: Botany
- Language: English
- Edited by: Lytton Musselman; Lisa Standley

Publication details
- History: 1899–present
- Publisher: New England Botanical Society
- Frequency: Quarterly

Standard abbreviations
- ISO 4: Rhodora

Indexing
- CODEN: RHODAB
- ISSN: 0035-4902
- OCLC no.: 01764319

Links
- Journal homepage

Rhodora is a peer-reviewed scientific journal published by the New England Botanical Society. Rhodora is devoted primarily to the botany of North America and accepts scientific papers and notes relating to the systematics, floristics, ecology, evolution, biogeography, population genetics, paleobotany, and conservation biology of this or floristically related regions. Rhodora is issued four times a year, typically totaling 450 printed pages annually.

The first editor for the journal was American botanist Benjamin Lincoln Robinson of Harvard University, who held the position from 1899 until 1928. Lytton Musselman is the appointed Editor-in-Chief of Rhodora. Lisa Standley is editor for "The Botanists' Corner."
