= Fire adaptations =

Traits of plants and animals

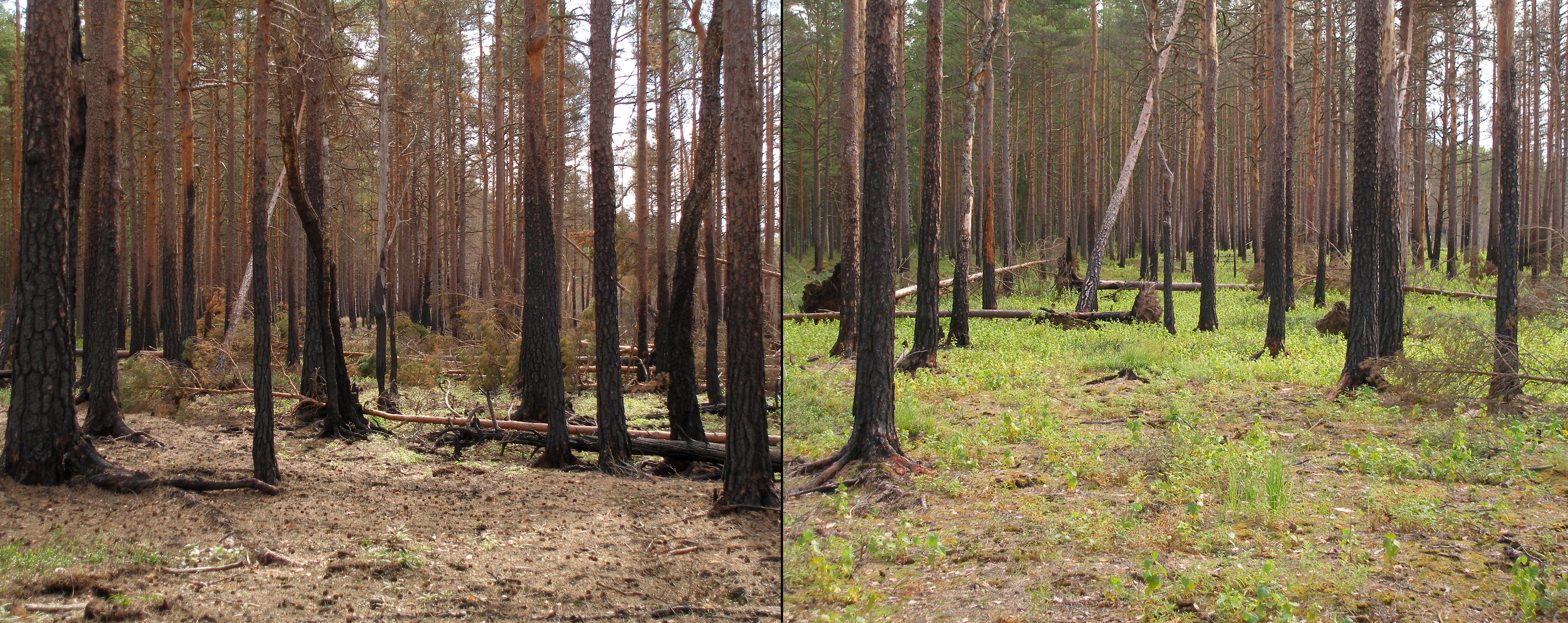
Ecological succession after a wildfire in a boreal pine forest next to Hara Bog, Lahemaa National Park, Estonia. The pictures were taken one and two years after the fire.

Fire adaptations are traits of plants and animals that help them survive wildfire or to use resources created by wildfire. These traits can help plants and animals increase their survival rates during a fire and/or reproduce offspring after a fire. Both plants and animals have multiple strategies for surviving and reproducing after fire. Plants in wildfire-prone ecosystems often survive through adaptations to their local fire regime. Such adaptations include physical protection against heat, increased growth after a fire event, and flammable materials that encourage fire and may eliminate competition.

For example, plants of the genus Eucalyptus contain flammable oils that encourage fire and hard sclerophyll leaves to resist heat and drought, ensuring their dominance over less fire-tolerant species. Dense bark, shedding lower branches, and high water content in external structures may also protect trees from rising temperatures. Fire-resistant seeds and reserve shoots that sprout after a fire encourage species preservation, as embodied by pioneer species. Smoke, charred wood, and heat can stimulate the germination of seeds in a process called serotiny. Exposure to smoke from burning plants promotes germination in other types of plants by inducing the production of the orange butenolide.

Fires have also allowed for surviving species to create adaptations post-fire. This allows for better survival post-fire and furthers establishment. Adaptations as an example for boreal forests can include thick bark and post-fire flowering that is directly linked to fires. Other examples of species outside of plants and trees allow for further adaptation post-fire to survive and regenerate their population. This allows for better dispersal and new dispersal patterns to create a more stable environment. Vegetation, as an example, showed that it had greater gene flow than when unburnt and undisturbed.

== Plant adaptations to fire ==
Unlike animals, plants are not able to move physically during a fire. However, plants have their own ways to survive a fire event or recover after a fire. The strategies can be classified into three types: resist (above-ground parts survive fire), recover (evade mortality by sprouting), and recruit (seed germination after the fire). Fire plays a role as a filter that can select different fire response traits.

=== Resist ===
==== Thick bark ====
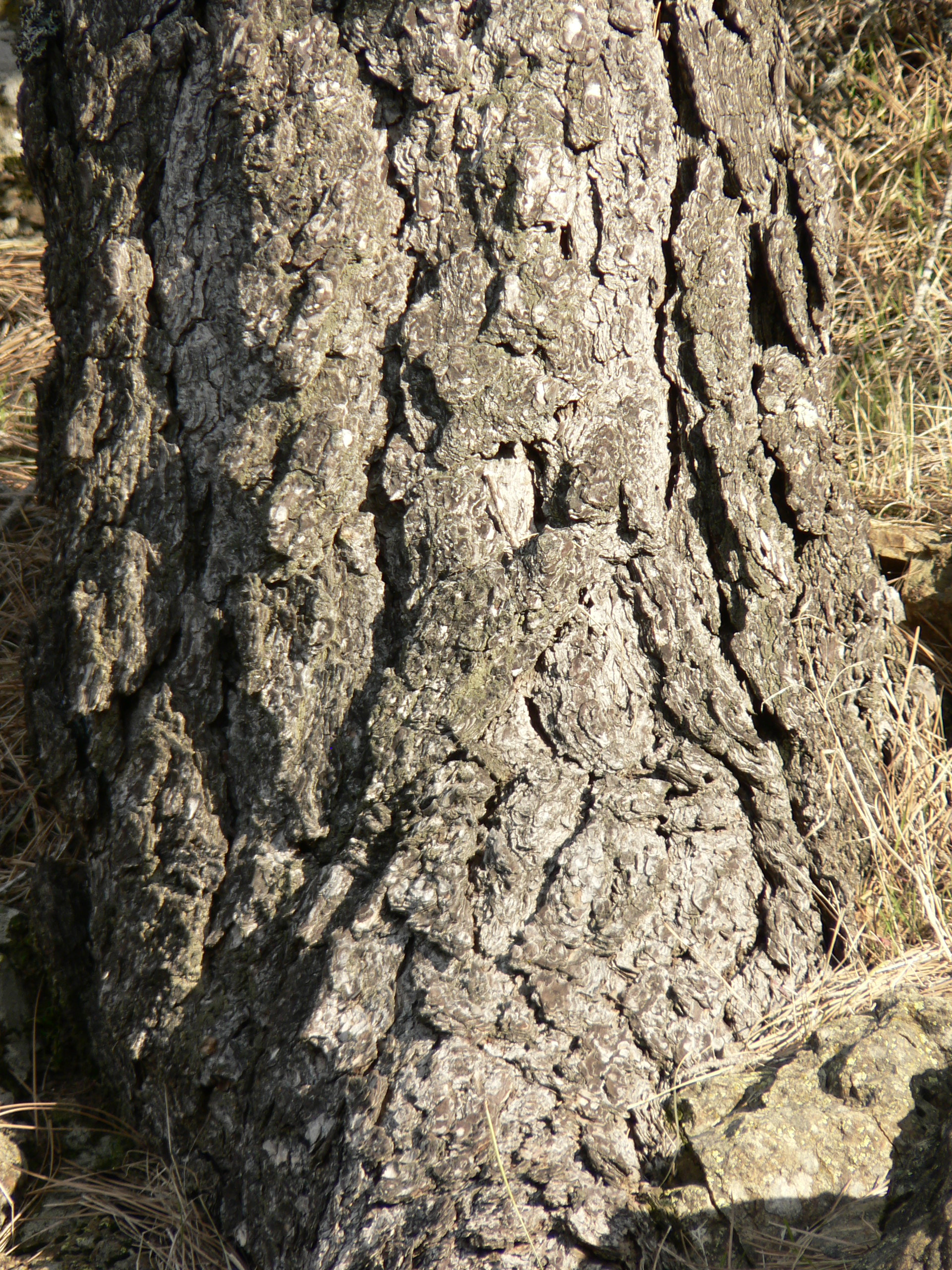
An example of thick bark

Fire impacts plants most directly via heat damage. However, new studies indicate that hydraulic failure kills trees during a fire in addition to fire scorching. High temperature cuts the water supply to the canopy and causes the death of the tree. Fortunately, thick bark can protect plants because they keep stems away from high temperature. Under the protection of bark, living tissue won't have direct contact with fire and the survival rate of plants will be increased. Heat resistance is a function of bark thermal diffusivity (a property of the species) and bark thickness (increasing exponentially with bark thickness). Thick bark is common in species adapted to surface or low-severity fire regimes. On the other hand, plants in crown or high-severity fire regimes usually have thinner barks because it is meaningless to invest in thick bark without it conferring an advantage in survivorship.

==== Self-pruning branches ====
Self-pruning is another trait of plants to resist fires. Self-pruning branches can reduce the chance for surface fire to reach the canopy because ladder fuels are removed. Self-pruning branches are common in surface or low-severity fire regimes.

=== Recover ===
==== Epicormic buds ====
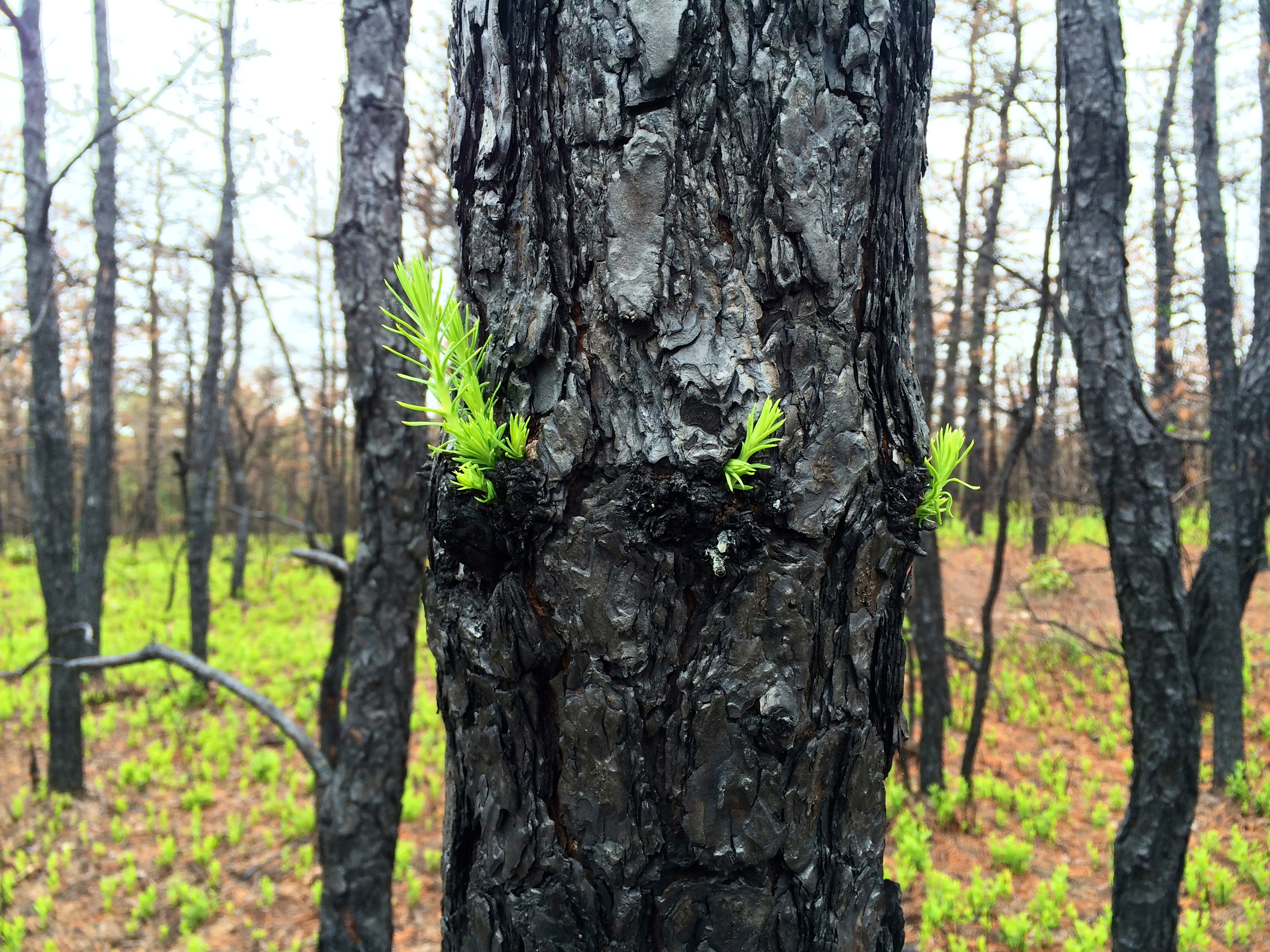
An example of epicormic sprouting

Epicormic buds are dormant buds under the bark or even deeper. Buds can turn active and grow due to environmental stress such as fire or drought. This trait can help plants to recover their canopies rapidly after a fire. For example, eucalypts are known for this trait. The bark may be removed or burnt by severe fires, but buds are still able to germinate and recover. This trait is common in surface or low-severity fire regimes.

==== Lignotubers ====
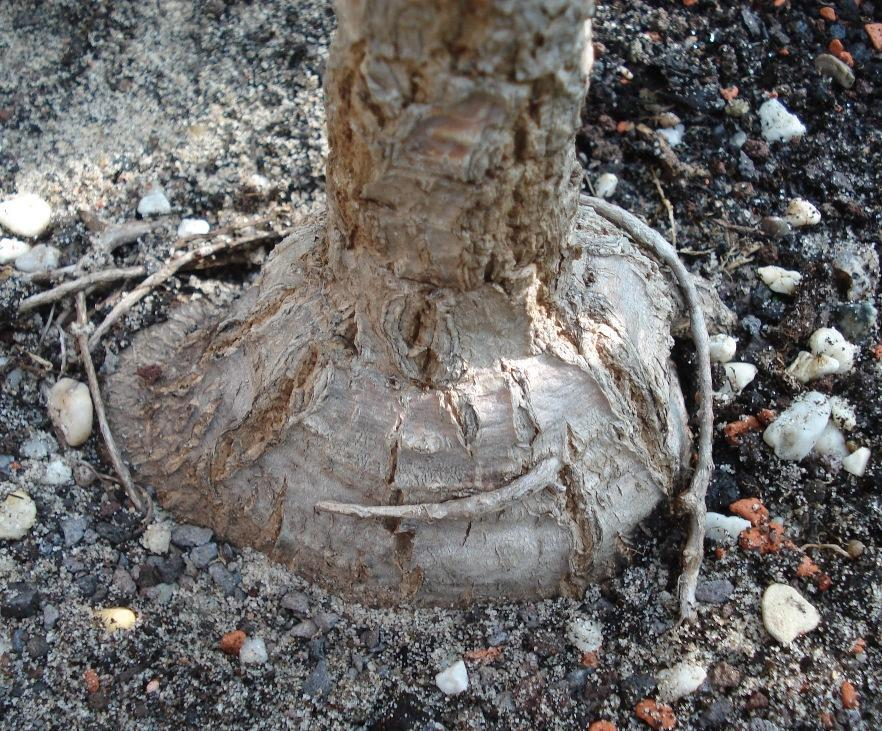
A basal lignotuber

Not all plants have thick bark and epicormic buds. But for some shrubs and trees, their buds are located below ground, which are able to re-sprout even when the stems are killed by fire. Lignotubers, woody structures around the roots of plants that contains many dormant buds and nutrients such as starch, are very helpful for plants to recover after a fire. In case the stem was damaged by a fire, buds will sprout forming basal shoots. Species with lignotubers are often seen in crown or high-severity fire regimes (e.g., chamise in chaparral).

==== Clonal spread ====
Clonal spread is usually triggered by fires and other forms of removal of above-ground stems. The buds from the mother plant can develop into basal shoots or suckers from roots some distance from the plant. Aspen and Californian redwoods are two examples of clonal spread. In clonal communities, all the individuals developed vegetatively from one single ancestor rather than reproduced sexually. For example, the Pando is a large clonal aspen colony in Utah that developed from a single quaking aspen tree. There are currently more than 40,000 trunks in this colony, and the root system is between 9,000 and 80,000 years old.

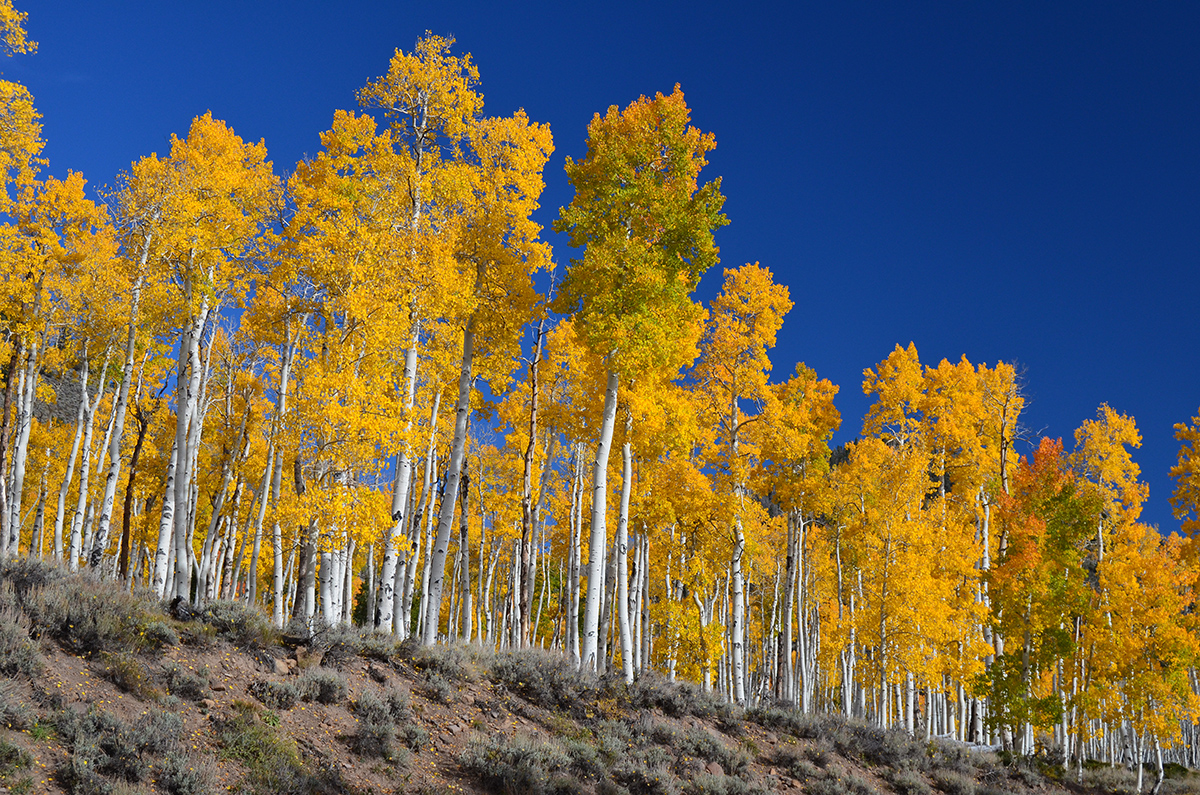
Pando is a clonal colony that developed from a single tree by clonal spreading.

=== Recruit ===
==== Serotiny ====
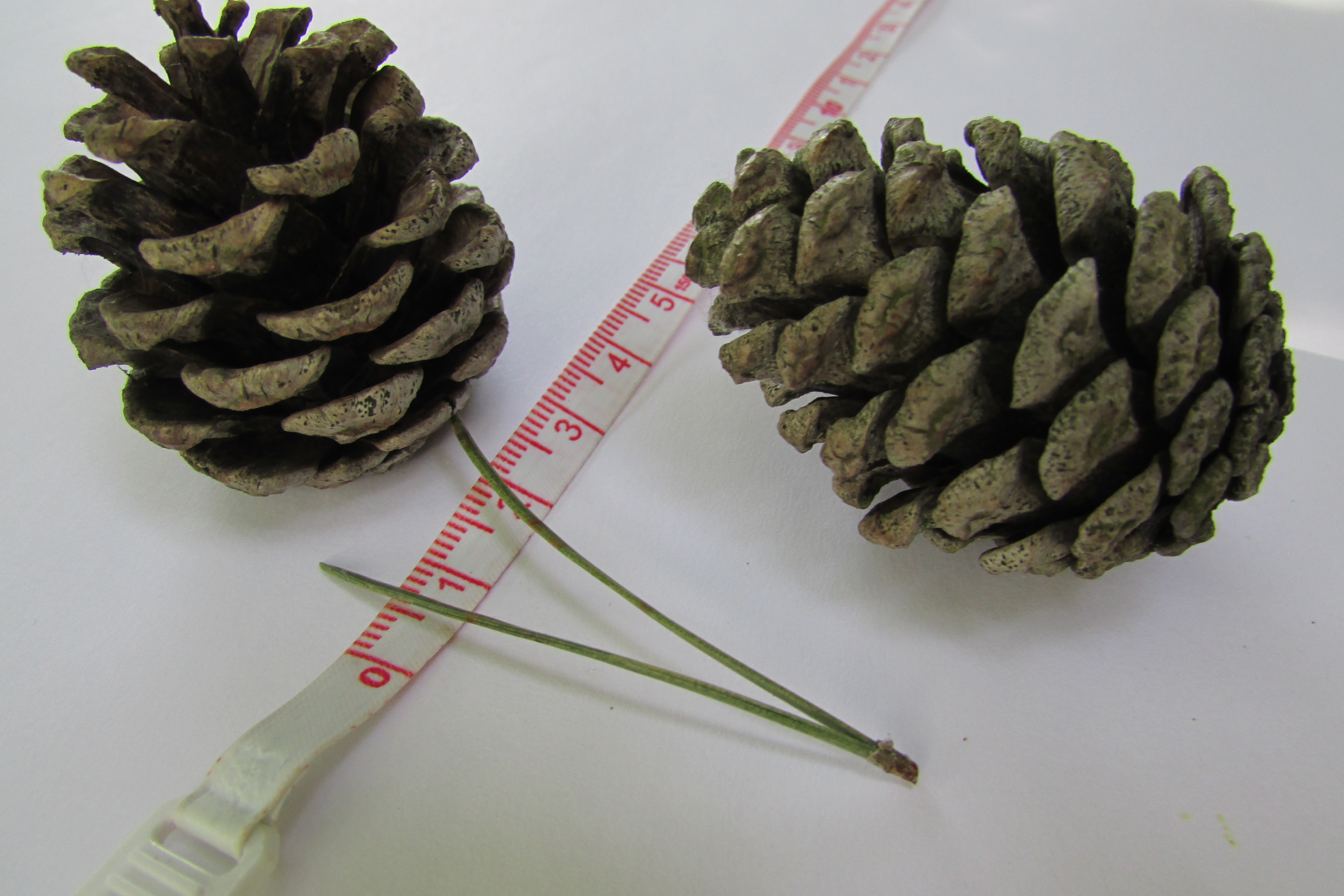
Jack Pine cones are serotinous.

Serotiny is a seed dispersal strategy in which the dissemination of seeds is stimulated by external triggers (such as fires) rather than by natural maturation. For serotinous plants, seeds are protected by woody structures during fires and will germinate after the fire. This trait can be found in conifer genera in both the northern and southern hemispheres as well as in flowering plant families (e.g., Banksia). Serotiny is a typical trait in the crown or high-severity fire regimes.

==== Fire stimulated germination ====
Many species persist in a long-lived soil seed bank, and are stimulated to germinate via thermal scarification or smoke exposure.

==== Fire-stimulated flowering ====
A less common strategy is fire-stimulated flowering.

==== Dispersal ====
Species with very high wind dispersal capacity and seed production often are the first arrivals after a fire or other soil disturbance. For example, fireweed is common in burned areas in the western United States.

== Plants and fire regimes ==
The fire regime exerts a strong filter on which plant species may occur in a given locality. For example, trees in high-severity regimes usually have thin bark while trees in low-severity regimes typically have thick bark. Another example will be that trees in surface fire regimes tend to have epicormic buds rather than basal buds. On the other hand, plants can also alter fire regimes. Oaks, for example, produce a litter layer which slows down the fire spread while pines create a flammable duff layer which increases fire spread. More profoundly, the composition of species can influence fire regimes even when the climate remains unchanged. For example, the mixed forests consists of conifers and chaparral can be found in Cascade Mountains. Conifers burn with low-severity surface fires while chaparral burns with high-severity crown fires. Ironically, some trees can "use" fires to help them to survive during competitions with other trees. Pine trees, for example, can produce flammable litter layers, which help them to take advantage during the completion with other, less fire adapted, species.

Grasslands in Western Sabah, Malaysian pine forests, and Indonesian Casuarina forests are believed to have resulted from previous periods of fire. Chamise deadwood litter is low in water content and flammable, and the shrub quickly sprouts after a fire. Cape lilies lie dormant until flames brush away the covering and then blossom almost overnight. Sequoia rely on periodic fires to reduce competition, release seeds from their cones, and clear the soil and canopy for new growth. Caribbean Pine in Bahamian pineyards have adapted to and rely on low-intensity, surface fires for survival and growth. An optimum fire frequency for growth is every 3 to 10 years. Too frequent fires favor herbaceous plants, and infrequent fires favor species typical of Bahamian dry forests.

== Evolution of fire survival traits ==
Phylogenetic studies indicated that fire adaptive traits have evolved for a long time (tens of millions of years) and these traits are associated with the environment. In habitats with regular surface fires, similar species developed traits such as thick bark and self-pruning branches. In crown fire regimes, pines have evolved traits such as retaining dead branches in order to attract fires. These traits are inherited from the fire-sensitive ancestors of modern pines. Other traits such as serotiny and fire-stimulating flowering also have evolved for millions of years. Some species are capable of using flammability to establish their habitats. For example, trees evolved with fire-embracing traits can "sacrifice" themselves during fires. But they also cause fires to spread and kill their less flammable neighbors. With the help of other fire adaptive traits such as serotiny, flammable trees will occupy the gap created by fires and colonize the habitat.

== Animals' adaptations to fires ==
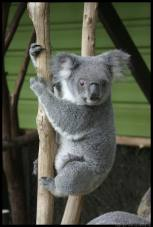
Arboreal koalas are vulnerable during forest fires

=== Direct effects of fires on animals ===
Most animals have sufficient mobility to successfully evade fires. Vertebrates such as large mammals and adult birds are usually capable of escaping from fires. However, young animals which lack mobility may suffer from fires and have high mortality. Ground-dwelling invertebrates are less impacted by fires (due to low thermal diffusivity of soil) while tree-living invertebrates may be killed by crown fires but survive surface fires. Animals are seldom killed by fires directly. Of the animals killed during the Yellowstone fires of 1988, asphyxiation is believed to be the primary cause of death.

=== Long term effects of fires on animals ===
More importantly, fires have long-term effects on the post-burn environment. Fires in seldom-burned rainforests can cause disasters. For example, El Niño-induced surface fires in central Brazilian Amazonia have seriously affected the habitats of birds and primates. Fires also expose animals to dangers such as humans or predators. Generally in a habitat previously with more understory species and less open site species, a fire may replace the fauna structure with more open species and much less understory species. However, the habitat normally will recover to the original structure.

== Animals and fire regimes ==
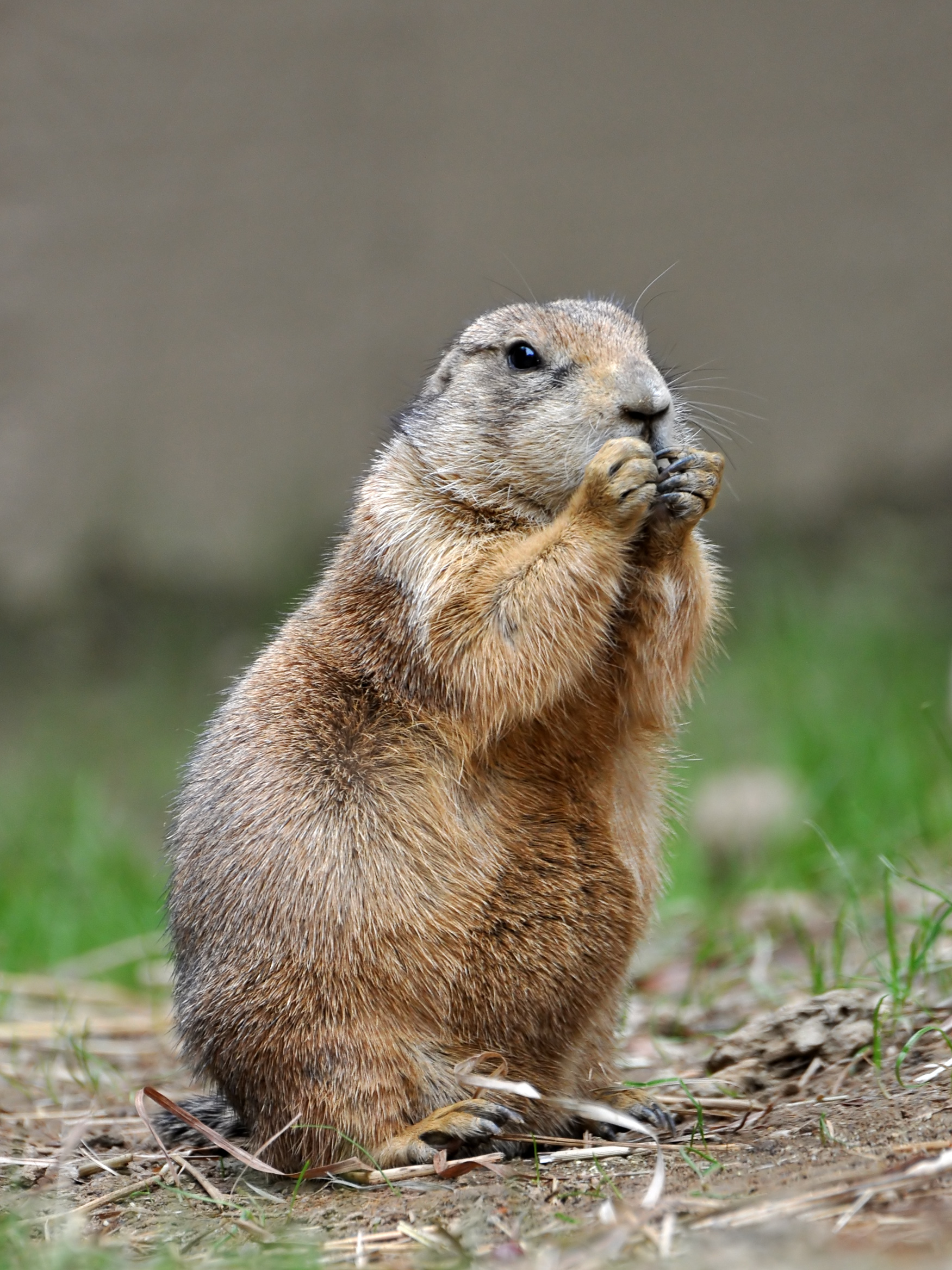
Prairie dogs have impacts on fire regimes in western USA

Just like plants may alter fire regimes, animals also have impacts on fire regimes. For example, grazing animals consume fuel for fires and reduce the possibilities of future fires. Many animals play roles as designers of fire regimes. Prairie dogs, for example, are rodents which are common in North America. They are able to control fires by grazing grasses too short to burn.

== Animal use of fire ==
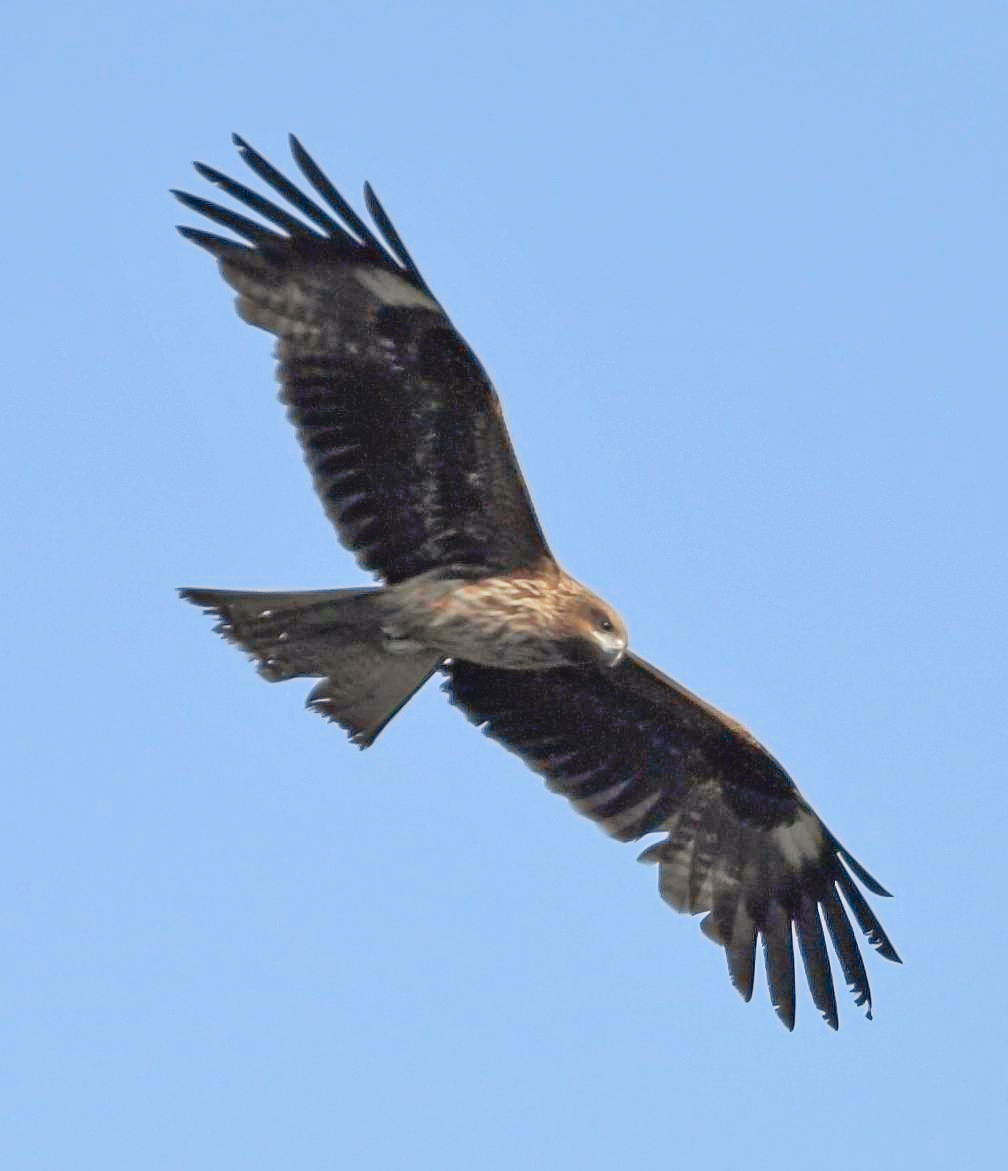
Besides humans, the black kite may be another species that purposely uses fire.

Fires are not always detrimental. Burnt areas usually have better quality and accessibility of foods for animals, which attract animals to forage from nearby habitats. For example, fires can kill trees, and dead trees can attract insects. Birds are attracted by the abundance of food, and they can spread the seeds of herbaceous plants. Eventually large herbivores will also flourish. Also, large mammals prefer newly burnt areas because they need less vigilance for predators.

An example of animals' uses of fires is the black kite, a carnivorous bird which can be found globally. In monsoonal areas of north Australia, surface fires are said to spread, including across intended firebreaks, by burning or smoldering pieces of wood or burning tufts of grass carried - potentially intentionally - by large flying birds accustomed to catch prey flushed out by wildfires. Species involved in this activity are the black kite (Milvus migrans), whistling kite (Haliastur sphenurus), and brown falcon (Falco berigora). Local Aborigines have known of this behavior for a long time, including in their mythology. To date, no clear recordings of this behaviour exist, rendering the testing of the intentions behind this behaviour difficult.

== See also ==
- Fire ecology
- Disturbance (ecology)
