= August von Bethmann-Hollweg =

German jurist and politician (1795–1877)

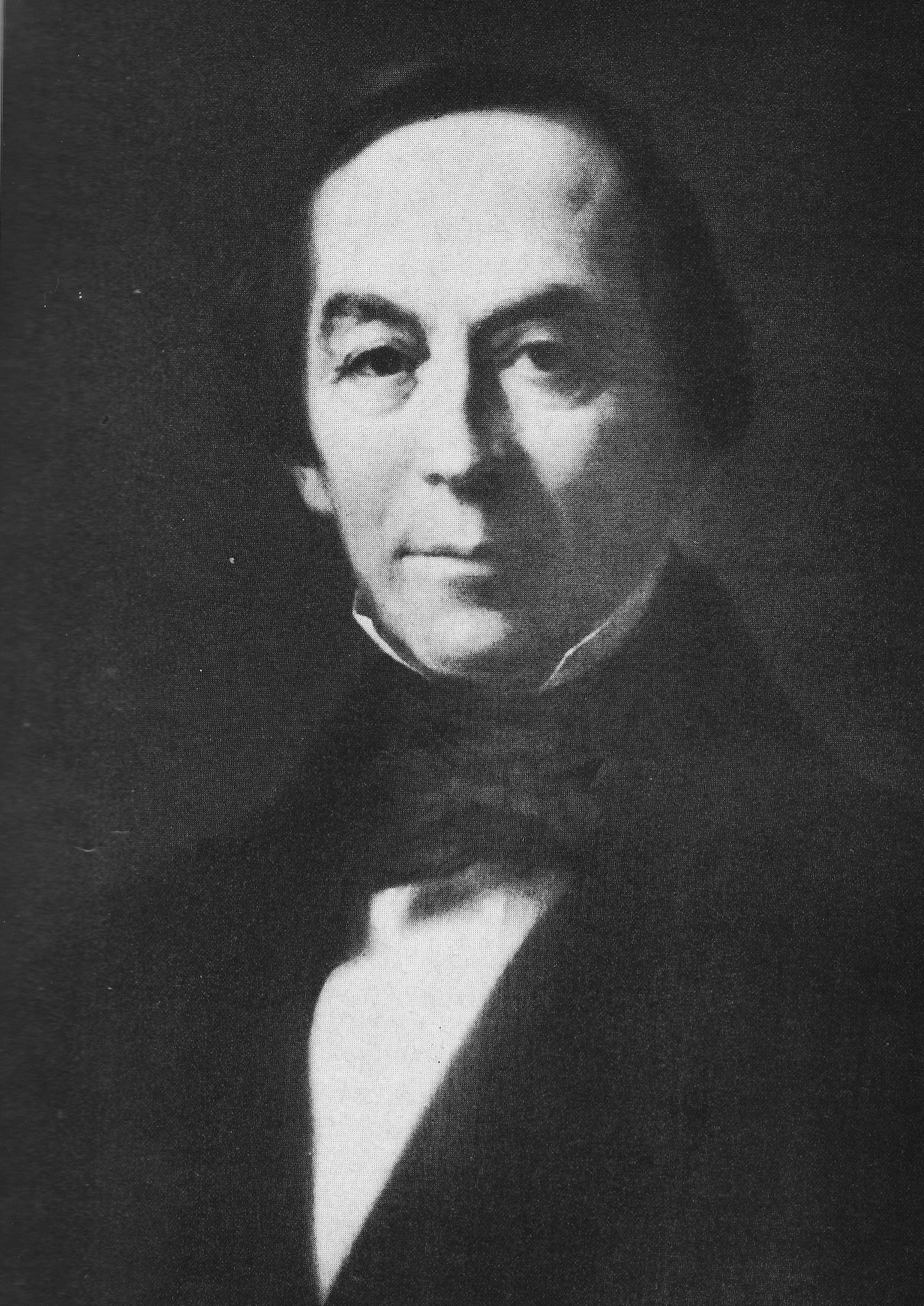
August von Bethmann-Hollweg

Moritz August von Bethmann-Hollweg (8 April 1795 – 14 July 1877) was a German jurist and Prussian politician.

== Early life ==
Bethmann-Hollweg was born on 8 April 1795 in Frankfurt am Main, He was the son of the banker Johann Jakob Bethmann-Hollweg and Susanne Elisabeth von Bethmann. As a child he was tutored by Carl Ritter and Georg Friedrich Grotefend.

Later he studied at Göttingen University, and then Frederick William University in Berlin, where he was especially influenced by Friedrich Carl von Savigny. While still a student, he participated in the deciphering of the works of the Roman jurist Gaius discovered at Verona by Niebuhr.

== Career ==
On New Year's Eve, 1817, he was transformed by a conversion experience into a born-again Christian. In the German Table Society, an exclusive society restricted to ethnic German Christians from birth, he met the brothers Leopold, Ernst Ludwig and Otto von Gerlach as well as Ernst Senfft von Pilsach and conversed with the Crown Prince, who would later, as king, elevate him to nobility. In 1819 he attained his habilitation in Berlin and became a tenured professor there in 1823. In 1824 he cofounded the Berlin Missionary Society with Leopold von Gerlach, August Neander and others in Berlin. From 1827 to 1828 he also served briefly as rector of his alma mater. He specialized in the history of civil legal procedure and made many pioneering contributions demonstrating a deep grasp of his subject and an independence from received doctrine, and showing the value of the historical viewpoint. He had an ongoing concern to reconcile his religious convictions with the rest of his life. He stayed away from politics and was repelled by the persecution of the so-called demagogues.

From 1829 he taught at Bonn University. The beneficial influences of this small community permitted him to reconcile his religious and professional lives and understand the moral foundations of the law. In 1840, on the death of Frederick William III, who had much appreciated his work, he was elevated to the hereditary nobility. In 1842, he was appointed as the government authority (German: Regierungsbevollmächtigten) at Bonn and as university trustee. Now his primary concern became the welfare of the university. This represented a departure from his life of academic research, and gave him more access to the government in Berlin, and he turned his attention more to religious and political developments. In 1845 he was appointed to the Prussian council of state. In 1848, as a result of the dissolution of the Prussian ministry, he gave up his university offices.

The frightfulness of the 1848 revolution, and the moral damage it revealed in many areas, decided von Bethmann-Hollweg for devoting himself to the moral and political well-being of the country. He was much opposed to the democratizing tendencies of the time, though still repelled by the reactionary elements. In 1848 he founded the Deutscher Evangelischer Kirchentag and served as its president or co-president until 1872. In addition he served as president of the Inner Mission (Germany) founded by Johann Hinrich Wichern. Within the ambit of the Frankfurt Parliament he struck a friendship with Dietrich Wilhelm Landfermann. Like the latter he tried to maintain a centrist political position: von Bethmann-Hollweg's aim, which he also publicized from 1852 onward in the Wochenblatt together with Graf von der Goltz, was to argue for a controlled expansion of a constitutional state in a conservative-liberal framework.

From 1849 to 1855 he served as a deputy in Prussia's first and second houses of parliament, apart from a few brief interruptions. Notwithstanding its small size, his faction was significant through its political integrity and intellectual prominence. From 1858 (advent of the regency of Wilhelm I) to 1862 (advent of Bismarck's ministry) von Bethmann-Hollweg served as the Prussian minister of education, culture and medicine. After his retirement he wrote the book for which he became chiefly known, Der Civilprozeß des Gemeinen Rechts in geschichtlicher Entwicklung (Civil Procedure in Common Law, A Historical Overview).

=== Legacy ===
As a writer on jurisprudence he had a deep influence in the reforms of the German laws following the enactment of the German Civil Code in 1896.

== Personal life ==
Bethmann-Hollweg was married to Auguste Wilhelmine Gebser of the noble Prussian family dating back to the Teutonic Order of Knights. Her nephew was the philosopher Jean Gebser. Together, they were the parents of:

- Johann Philipp Karl Theodor von Bethmann-Hollweg (1821–1886), who married Countess Freda Anna Karoline von Arnim-Boitzenburg.
- Felix von Bethmann Hollweg (1824–1900), who married French Swiss Isabella de Rougemont.
- Anna Friederike von Bethmann-Hollweg (1827–1892), who married Count Albert von Pourtalès, the Prussian Envoy to the Ottoman Empire and to the Second French Empire, in 1847.
- Elisabeth von Bethmann-Hollweg (b. 1834), who married Baron Hans Maximilian Robert von Dobeneck.

Bethmann-Hollweg died 14 July 1877 on Rheineck castle near Niederbreisig on the Rhine.

=== Descendants ===
Through his son Felix, he was a grandfather of Theobald von Bethmann Hollweg, who served as Chancellor of Germany from 1909 to 1917.

== Publications ==
- Grundregeln zu Vorlesungen über den allgemeinen Civilprozeß, 1821 (1832)
- Versuch über einzelne Teile der Theorie des Civilprozesses, 1827
- Die Gerichtsverfassung und der Prozeß des sinkenden Römischen Reiches, 1834
- Die Entstehung der lombardischen Städtefreiheit, 1846
- Der Civilprozeß des Gemeinen Rechts in geschichtlicher Entwicklung I-IV/1, 1863–74
- Ueber Gestezgebung und Rechtswissenshaft als Aufgabe unserer Zeit (On law making and jurisprudence as tasks for our time), 1876
