= Helen S. Conant =

American poet

- Born: Helen Charlotte Peters Stevens; October 9, 1839; Methuen, Massachusetts, US
- Died: April 17, 1899 (aged 59); New York City, US
- Spouse: S. S. Conant (m. 1858)
- Children: 1
- Writing career
- Notable work: The Butterfly Hunters

Helen Stevens Conant (October 9, 1839 – April 17, 1899) was an American author, poet, and translator.

== Personal life ==
Helen Charlotte Peters Stevens was born to Abiel Stevens and Charlotte Stevens (née Peters) on October 9, 1839, in Methuen, Massachusetts. Her ancestors, John Stevens and Andrew Peters immigrated to Andover, Massachusetts, from England in the mid-17th century. As a child, she was taught by a governess and private tutors.

Stevens married journalist and editor Samuel Stillman Conant, son of professor and writer Thomas Jefferson Conant and editor and author Hannah O'Brien Chaplin Conant. Stevens and Conant married on June 10, 1858, in Lawrence, Massachusetts. The couple had one child together, a son named Thomas Peters Conant, on July 11, 1860, in Paris, France. The family later moved to Brooklyn, New York.

Conant died on April 17, 1899.

== Literary works ==
=== Books ===
Conant is best known for writing The Butterfly Hunters, published in 1868 by Ticknor and Fields. She is also known for A Primer of German Literature (1877) and A Primer of Spanish Literature (1878), both published by Harper & Brothers. Conant co-translated The Ancient Cities of the New World (1887) by Désiré Charnay from French with J. Gonino.

=== Articles ===
Many of Conant's articles were published in various Harper & Brother publications, including Harper's Magazine and Harper's Weekly, for which her husband was managing editor from 1869 until his disappearance in 1885.

- Birds and plumage
- Kitchen and dining-room
- Joseph Mallord William Turner
- A ramble in Central Park
- Picturesque Edinburgh

=== Poetry ===
- From the Spanish of Calderon
- Old German love song (thirteenth century)
- At Manhattan Beach
- Love's Doubt
- "Le Pere Jacques"
- Watch-words

Conant contributed many of her poems to various Harper & Brother publications, including Harper's Bazar, for which she was an editor.
