= S. S. Conant =

American journalist, author, and literary editor

- Born: December 11, 1831; Waterville, Maine, U.S.
- Disappeared: January 1885 (aged 53)
- Education: Madison College
- Employers: The New York Times; Harper's Weekly
- Spouse: Helen S. Conant (m. 1858)
- Parents: Thomas Jefferson Conant (father); Hannah O'Brien Chaplin (mother)

Samuel Stillman Conant (December 11, 1831 – after January 1885) was an American journalist, author, and literary editor. He edited Harper's Weekly from 1869 to his disappearance in 1885.

== Biography ==
Samuel Stillman Conant was born in Waterville, Maine, on December 11, 1831, to Thomas Jefferson Conant, a reverend, and Hanna O'Brien Conant, née Chaplin. His parents were well known biblical scholars. He was educated at Madison College in Hamilton, New York, before spending several years studying across Europe, in cities including Berlin, Heidelberg, and Munich. Conant returned to the United States in 1860, when he entered into the field of journalism. He worked as managing editor of The New York Times from 1862 to 1869, resigning after Henry Jarvis Raymond died.

In 1875 he published a translation from Russian to English of Circassian Boy by Mikhail Lermontov. Conant was one of the most prominent art critics of his era. He published some criticism for The Galaxy in 1885.

He then became managing editor at Harper's Weekly, a post he held until he disappeared in January 1885.

=== Disappearance ===
Conant left his office on January 16, 1885, and was never heard from again. In 1890, a skeleton was found in Rockaway Beach, Long Island, that was thought by some to be his body.

== Personal life ==
Conant married Helen Charlotte Peters Stevens in 1858; the couple had one child, Thomas Peters.

He was a member of the Century Club.
