= Conservatism in Germany =

Conservatism in Germany (German: Konservatismus) has encompassed a wide range of theories and ideologies in the last three hundred years, but most historical conservative theories supported the monarchical/hierarchical political structure.

== Historical conservative strains ==
During the pre-revolutionary Vormärz era, the label conservatism united a loose movement of intellectual and political forces without any party organisation comparable to the British Tories. The tradition of conservative theorists like Justus Möser (1720–1794) opposed the Enlightenment tendencies and the ideals of the French Revolution.

While many of the conservative theorists are labelled "political Romantics" (most notably by Carl Schmitt, himself a conservative), at least four strains are distinguishable before 1945:

- Status quo ante Romantic conservatives, who wanted to restore the medieval as it was prior to the French Revolution. Notable theorists are Novalis, Friedrich Schelling, Karl Ludwig von Haller and Adam Müller.
- Conservative Journalism defends the status quo of Metternichs System (the Restoration) and national conservatism. Notable theorists include Friedrich von Gentz, Friedrich Schlegel and Ernst Moritz Arndt.
- Conservative writing in defense of the (constitutional) monarchy in Germany included theorists Georg Wilhelm Friedrich Hegel, Heinrich Friedrich Karl vom und zum Stein and Friedrich Julius Stahl.
- The conservative revolutionary movement and pre-Nazi radicals, such as Arthur Moeller van den Bruck, Oswald Spengler (adding pessimism and cultural conservatism) and Carl Schmitt.

Also included are the anti-Enlightenment Romanticism of Friedrich Nietzsche, the conservative Realpolitik and statecraft of Otto von Bismarck and the anti-republican monarchism of the German National People's Party (DNVP) during the Weimar Republic.

== Otto von Bismarck ==
Conservative thought developed alongside nationalism in Germany, culminating in Germany's victory over France in the Franco-Prussian War, the creation of the unified German Empire in 1871 and the simultaneous rise to power of Chancellor Otto von Bismarck. Bismarck's "balance of power" foreign policy model maintained peace in Europe for decades at the end of the 19th century. His "revolutionary conservatism" was a conservative state-building strategy designed to make ordinary Germans—not just his own Junker elite—more loyal to state and emperor. He created the modern welfare state in Germany in the 1880s.

According to Kees van Kersbergen and Barbara Vis, his strategy was "granting social rights to enhance the integration of a hierarchical society, to forge a bond between workers and the state so as to strengthen the latter, to maintain traditional relations of authority between social and status groups, and to provide a countervailing power against the modernist forces of liberalism and socialism".

Bismarck also enacted universal male suffrage in the new German Empire in 1871. He became a great hero to German conservatives, who erected many monuments to his memory after he left office in 1890.

After the Revolutions of 1848, conservative parties were represented in several Landtag assemblies of the German states, particularly in the Prussian Landtag, from 1871 onwards also in the Reichstag parliament of the German Empire. The Prussian conservatives, mainly East Elbian landowners (Junker), who had been sceptical towards the Unification of Germany promoted by Minister President Bismarck, re-organised themselves within the German Conservative Party. In the Reichstag, they had to face the rivalry of the Free Conservative secession, which comprised bureaucratic elite leaders as well as Rhenish business magnates, who had supported Bismarck's politics from the beginning.

During Bismarck's time in office, German conservatives more and more turned to statism and paternalism in the rising conflict between economic liberalism as promoted by the National Liberals and the labour movement represented by the Social Democratic Party. They supported the Chancellor's Anti-Socialist Laws, but also strongly embraced the implementation of a social insurance (pensions, accident insurance and medical care) that laid the ground for the German welfare state. Likewise, conservative politicians appreciated the enforcement of what they called national interests during the Kulturkampf against the Catholic Church and the Centre Party. Though Bismarck's domestic policies did not prevail against his opponents, they further strengthened the power of the state.

At the same time, the influence of the parliament on those policy guidelines remained limited. Universal suffrage (for men) had been implemented already in the 1867 Reichstag election of the North German Confederation, but the MPs had few legislative powers. The German government remained responsible only to the Emperor and the Chancellor used to rule by alternating majorities. Not until the late days of World War I a parliamentary reform was carried out, instigated by the Oberste Heeresleitung (Supreme Army Command) in view of the German defeat. Biased by particular interests and reserved towards political parties espousing an ideology or vision in general, German conservatives up to then had not been able to install a big tent in the sense of a people's party.

== Weimar Republic and Nazi oppression ==
Conservatism in Germany was shaken by the lost World War I and the German Revolution of 1918–1919. The thinkers of the conservative revolution, a reaction to the lapse of the once venerated monarchical tradition, strived for an inventive realignment (new world order) based on continuous principles while in the late 1920s the DNVP under press baron Alfred Hugenberg turned towards far-right nationalist policies, culminating in the co-operation with the Nazi Party on the eve of the Machtergreifung in 1933. Several conservative politicians like Hugenberg himself, Franz von Papen and Konstantin von Neurath became members of the Hitler Cabinet and some like Franz Seldte even joined the NSDAP.

During the period of Nazi rule, all other political parties, including conservative, were outlawed. The "national revolution" of the Nazis had priority and the racist and social changes in German society were not allowed to be stopped by the conservative forces of "reaction" (Reaktion, see "Horst-Wessel-Lied"), like for instance the Catholic, Christian-democratic Zentrum and the Prussian monarchists. Several conservative opponents of the Nazi regime like former Chancellor Kurt von Schleicher or Edgar Julius Jung were murdered during the Night of the Long Knives in 1934. After a period of pacification in the Third Reich, notable conservatives were involved in the German Resistance, most notably in the 20 July plot.

== Modern conservatism ==
After World War II, conservatism in Germany had to deal with the experience of totalitarianism and its own involvement. Its protagonists finally adopted the ideals of a liberal constitutional (Rechtsstaat) democracy and in turn eliminated themselves as a separate political power.

In modern Germany, the post-war Christian Democratic Union (CDU) along with the Christian Social Union in Bavaria (CSU) claim to represent all forms of conservatism in Germany. National conservative new establishments like the German Party did not last while up to today there remain some marginal parties to the right of the CDU and CSU, difficult to distinguish from the far-right-parties, e.g. The Republicans. There also exist marginal movements to restore the German monarchy, most notably Tradition und Leben. During the German student movement of the late 1960s, CDU/CSU politicians called for a "strong state" and the restriction of individual rights in order to put down the disturbances.

Notable modern ("technocratic") conservative theorists included Ernst Jünger (1895–1998) and his brother Friedrich Georg Jünger (1898–1977), Hans Freyer (1887–1969), Helmut Schelsky (1912–1984) and Arnold Gehlen (1904–1976). They stressed the subjection of political decisions to the circumstances determined by a technologically advanced civilisation, denying ideological claims to overcome social alienation, which would remain an illusion only advocated by demagogues.

== Recent developments ==
Like most political parties in Germany, the CDU and to a lesser extent, the CSU have turned to centrist policies after German reunification. This has led to an emphasis on economic liberalism and more social progressivism compared to firm conservative positions of the past. However, the party's claimed conservative feature remains a non-defined iridescent term, oscillating between national and social manifestation. A key example was the welcoming nature of Angela Merkel's governments towards immigrants from the Islamic world, despite the CDU-CSU often being opposed to such measures in the past.

Since West Germany Chancellor Helmut Kohl formed a coalition government of the CDU and the liberal Free Democratic Party (FDP) in 1982, both parties have often been frequently referred to as belonging to a larger centre-right (bürgerlich, "civic") faction within the German party system. However, this distinction has been criticised for neglecting not only social liberal trends, but also conservative tendencies within the centre-left parties like the Social Democrats or The Greens. In certain areas such as sustainability, education and family rights, the CDU-CSU tend to hold liberal positions while remaining somewhat conservative on foreign policy, defense, immigration and bureaucracy.

== Conservative figures ==
Prominent German conservative figures include:

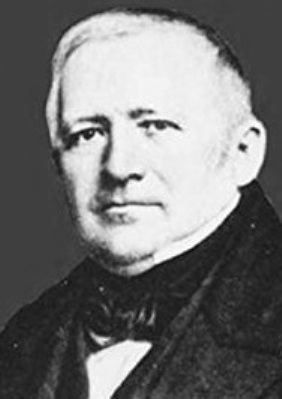
Ernst Ludwig von Gerlach

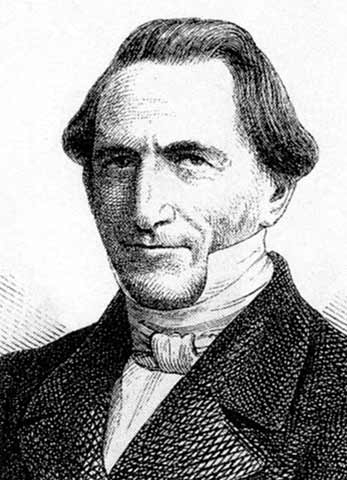
Friedrich Julius Stahl

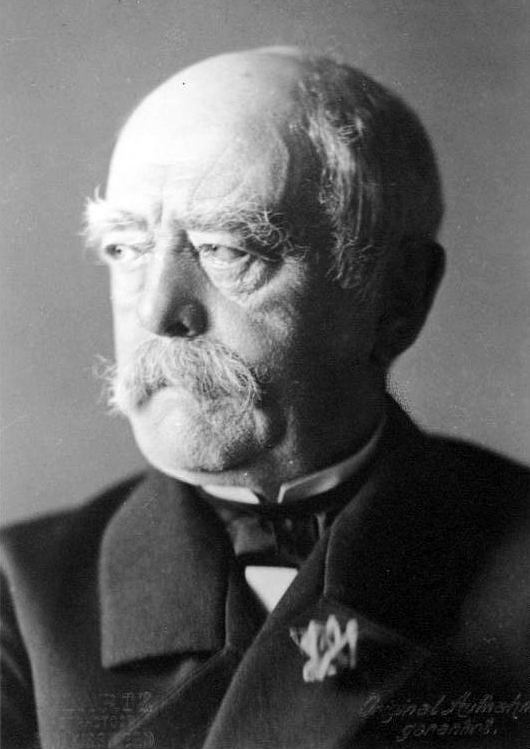
Chancellor Otto von Bismarck

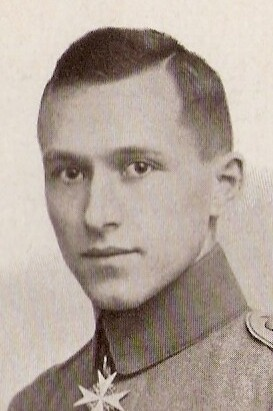
Ernst Jünger

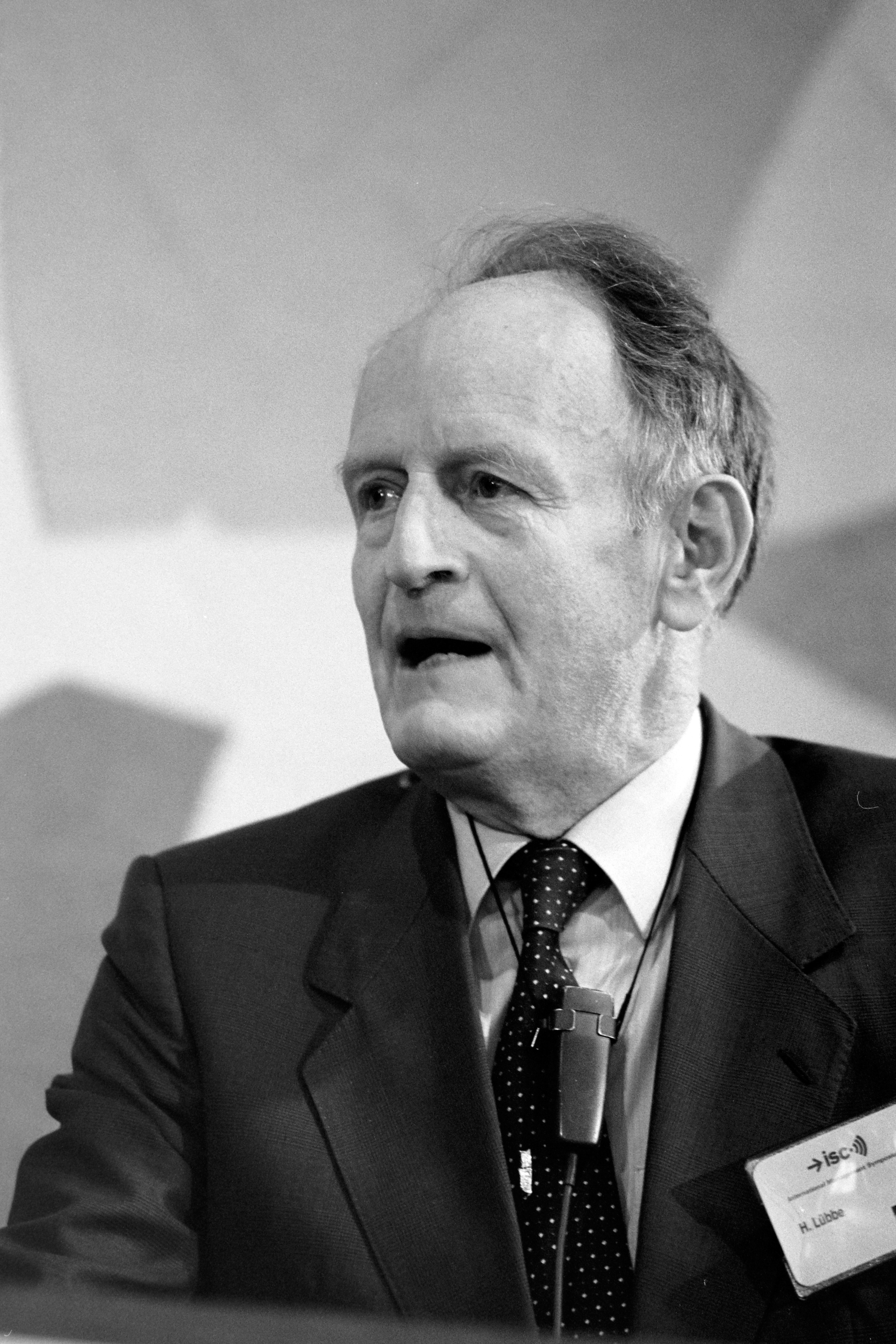
Hermann Lübbe

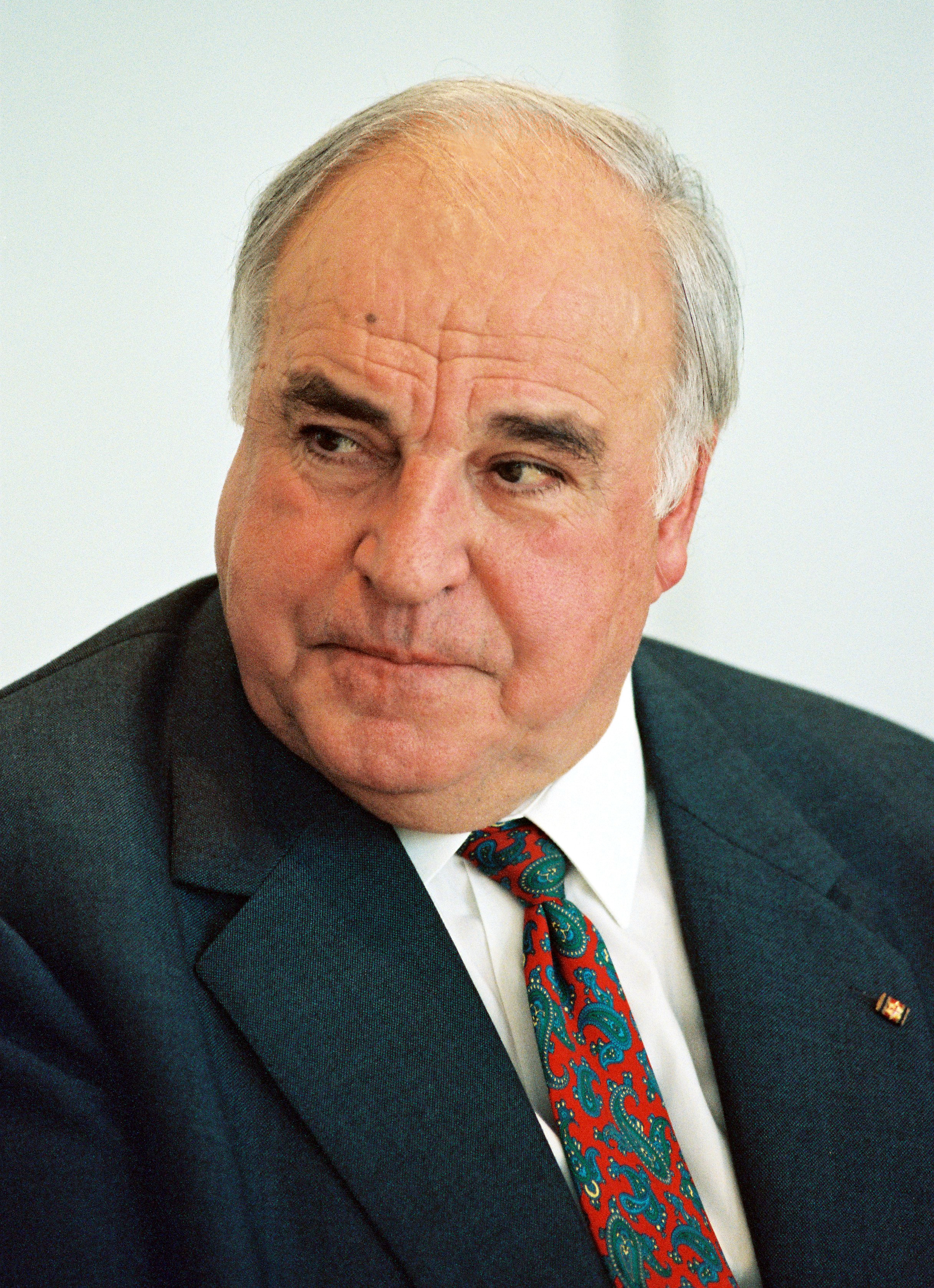
Chancellor Helmut Kohl

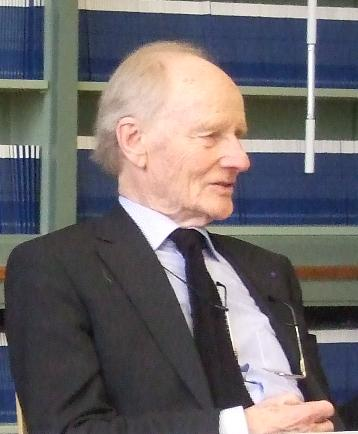
Robert Spaemann

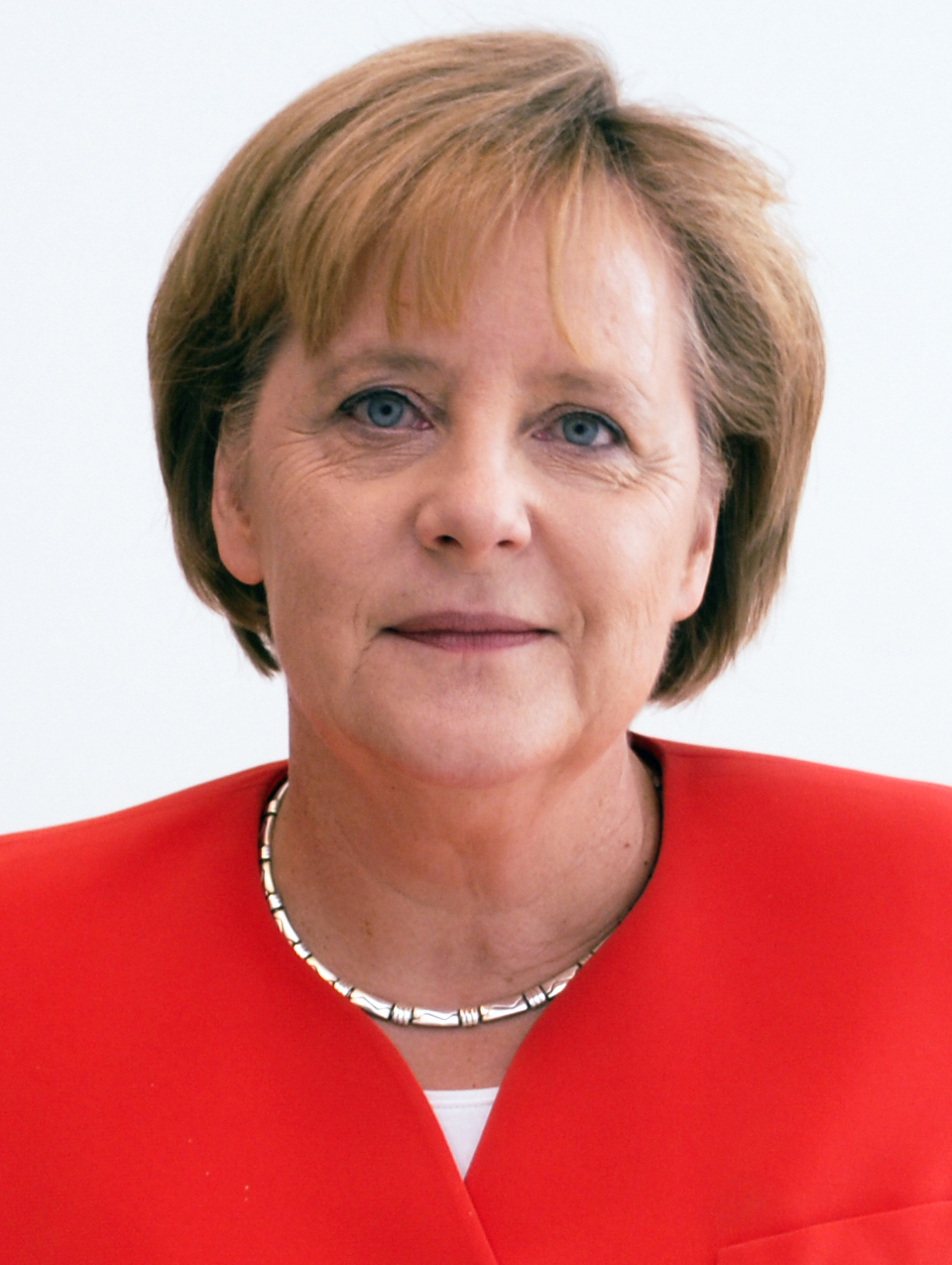
Chancellor Angela Merkel

== See also ==
- Alternative for Germany
- Bourgeois party
- CDU/CSU
- Right-conservatism
- Free Democratic Party of Germany
- Agrarian Conservatism in Germany
- Conservative Party (Prussia)
- Liberalism in Germany
- Far-right politics in Germany
