= Leopold von Gerlach =

Leopold von Gerlach is the short-form name of:

- Carl Friedrich Leopold von Gerlach (1757–1813), first mayor of Berlin
- Ludwig Friedrich Leopold von Gerlach (1790–1861), his son who became a Prussian general
