= Imperial Liberal Party =

- Leader: Chlodwig, Prince of Hohenlohe-Schillingsfürst
- Founder: Chlodwig, Prince of Hohenlohe-Schillingsfürst
- Founded: 1871
- Dissolved: 1874
- Ideology: Conservative liberalism National liberalism Liberal conservatism
- Political position: Centre to centre-right (Note: The Imperial Liberal Party was the most conservative of Germany's liberal parties of its time. It was more right-leaning than the right-liberal National Liberal Party, but left-leaning than the liberal-conservative Free Conservative Party.)

The Imperial Liberal Party (German: Liberale Reichspartei) was a political party in Germany during the 1870s.

== History ==
The party contested the first elections in the newly unified Germany in 1871, winning 30 seats. The 1874 elections saw the party's vote share fall from 7% to just 1%, as it won only three seats. The party did not contest any further elections.

== Election results ==
=== Reichstag ===
Election	Votes	%	+/–	Seats	+/–	Rank	Status
1871	274,068	7.05	New	33 / 382	New	6th	Opposition
1874	98,072	1.89	▼5.16	8 / 397	▼25	▼10th	Opposition

== See also ==
- Conservatism in Germany
- Liberalism in Germany
