= Hannah Conant =

Hannah Conant may refer to:

- Hannah Maria Conant Tracy Cutler (1815–1896), American abolitionist and suffragette
- Hannah O'Brien Chaplin Conant (1809–1865), American Biblical scholar
