= Conservative Party (Prussia) =

Prussian political party

Conservative Party Konservative Partei
- Founders: Leopold von Gerlach; Ludwig von Gerlach; Friedrich Julius Stahl
- Founded: 1848; 178 years ago
- Dissolved: 1876; 150 years ago
- Preceded by: Conservative faction in the Prussian National Assembly
- Succeeded by: German Conservative Party; Free Conservative Party
- Newspaper: Neue Preußische Zeitung (commonly called the Kreuzzeitung)
- Ideology: Conservatism; Monarchism; Anti-parliamentarianism; Defense of Junker interests
- Political position: Right-wing

The Conservative Party (German: Konservative Partei) was a political party in Prussia which was founded in 1848 by the relatively loose cooperation of conservative associations, groups and members of parliament.

In 1866 the Free Conservative Party (known as the German Reich Party in the Reichstag from 1871) split from the Conservatives, who were then called Old Conservatives. In 1876 the Conservative Party merged with the newly founded German Conservative Party.

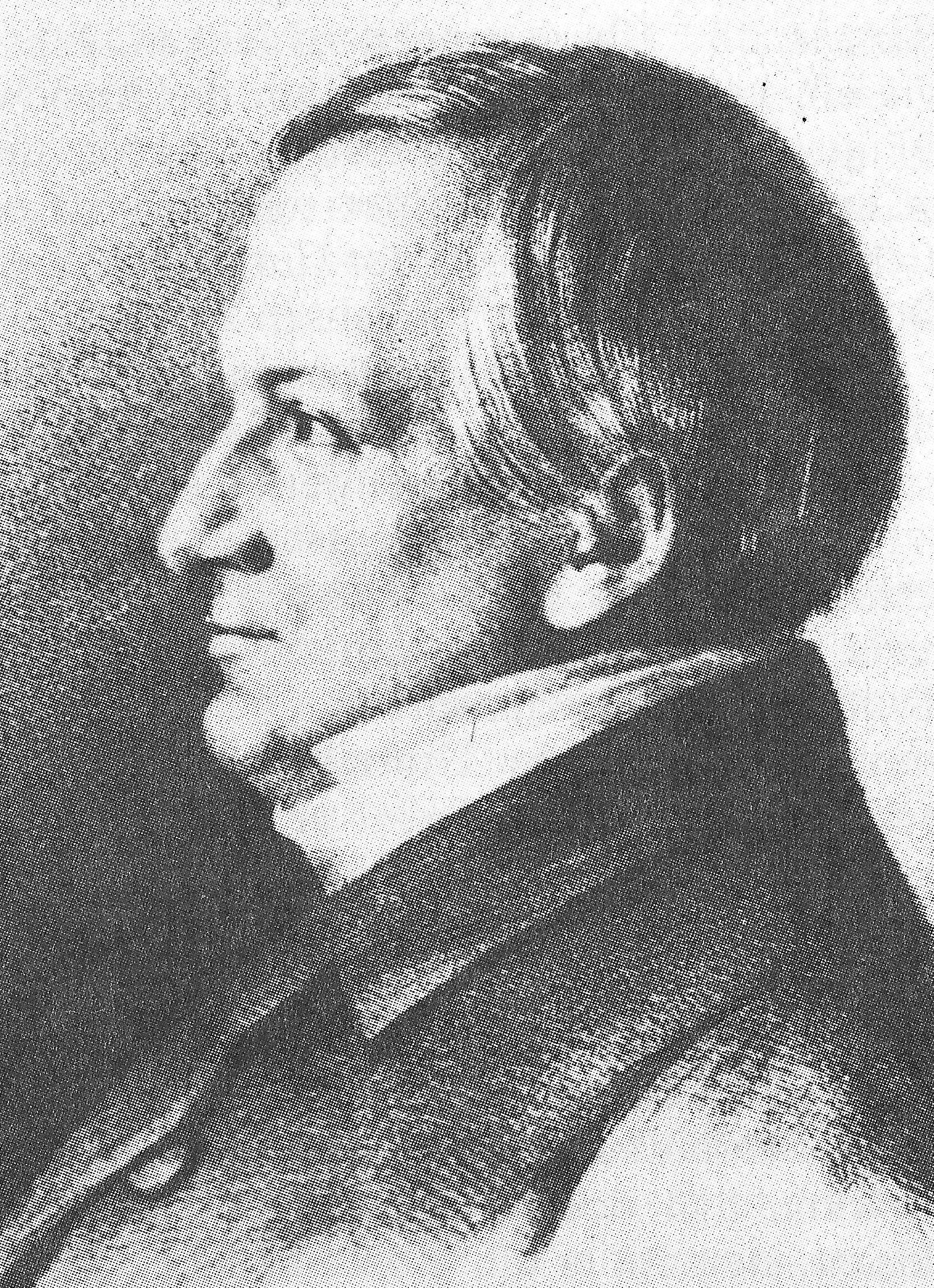
Ernst Ludwig von Gerlach

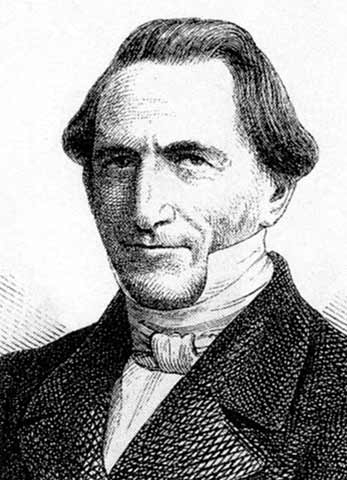
Friedrich Julius Stahl

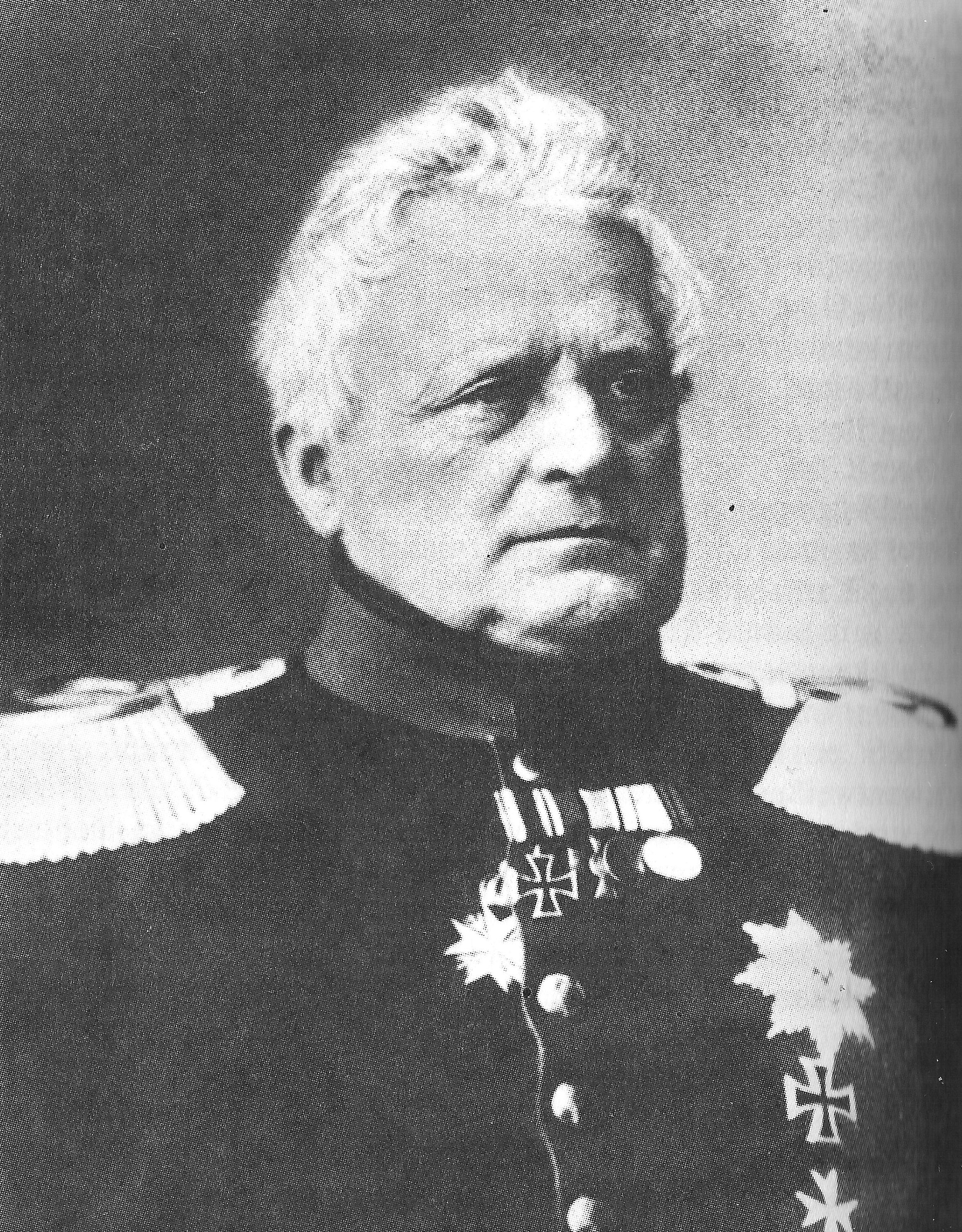
Leopold von Gerlach

== Chairmen ==
- Ernst Ludwig von Gerlach

== Electoral results ==
=== German Reichstag ===
Election year	Constituency		Seats won	+/–
Election year	Votes	%	Seats won	+/–
February 1867	629,360	16.86	63 / 297	
August 1867–1868	480,775	20.92	66 / 382	▲3
1871	524,881	13.51	56 / 382	▼9
1874	352,050	6.78	21 / 397	▼35

== See also ==
- Conservatism in Germany
