= Ludwig Friedrich Leopold von Gerlach =

German general (1790–1861)

Leopold von Gerlach
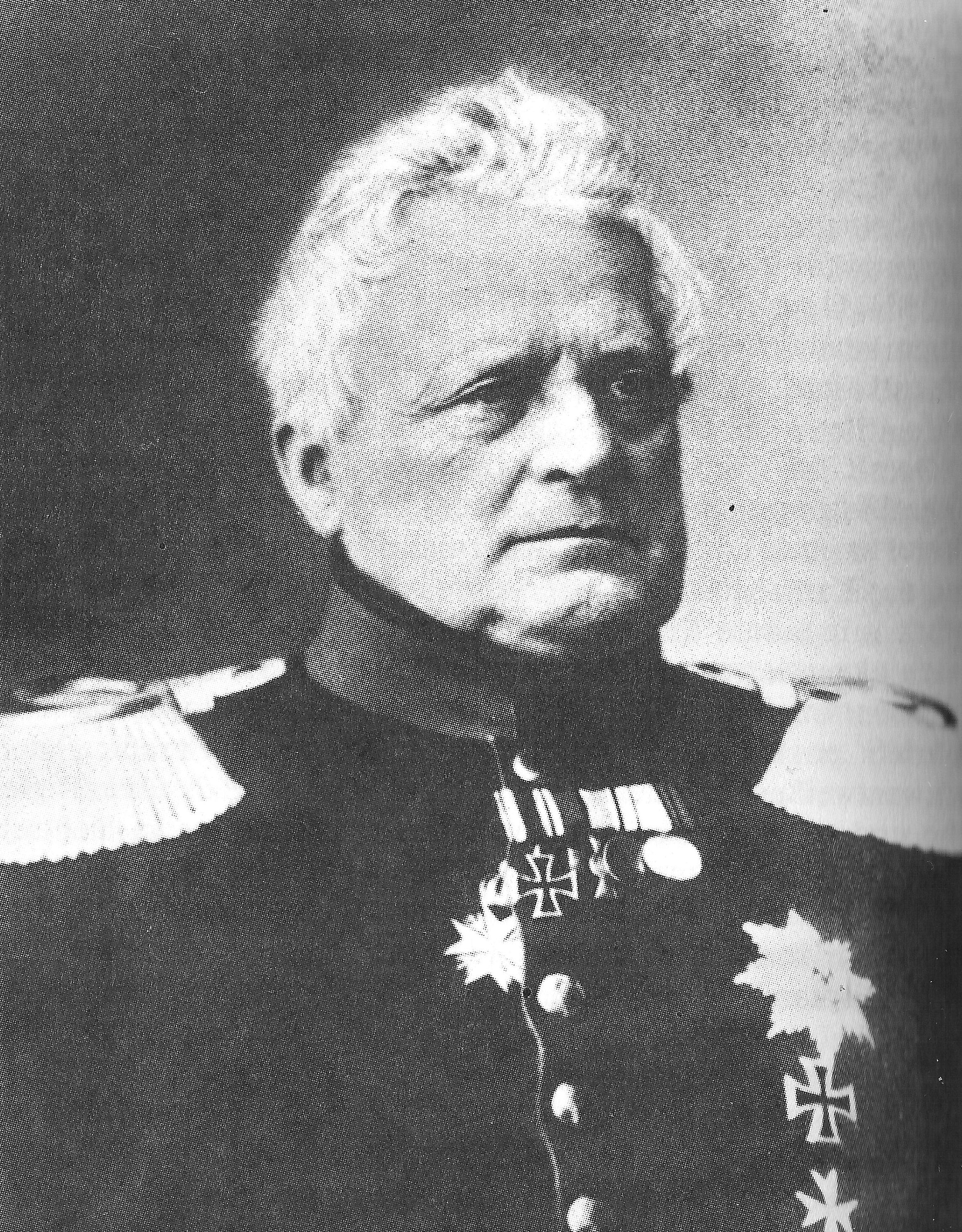
- Leopold von Gerlach
- Born: 17 September 1790; Berlin, Prussia
- Died: 10 January 1861 (aged 70); Berlin, Prussia
- Military career
- Allegiance: (Kingdom of Prussia) Prussia
- Branch: Prussian Army

(Ludwig Friedrich) Leopold von Gerlach (17 September 1790 – 10 January 1861) was a Prussian army general, adjutant to King Frederick William IV of Prussia and a Protestant conservative associate of Otto von Bismarck.

== Ancestry ==
He was the son of Carl Friedrich Leopold von Gerlach (1757–1813) and his wife Agnes, née von Raumer (1762–1831). His father was mayor of Berlin and later District President and President of the War and Domains Chamber of the Electoral March of Brandenburg.

== Military career ==
Gerlach attended the Joachimsthal Gymnasium in Berlin and in 1803 was commissioned as a corporal in the infantry regiment "von Arnim" in the Prussian Army. After his promotion to ensign, he took part in the Battle of Auerstedt in 1806 during the War of the Fourth Coalition. He was taken prisoner but was released on his word of honor and placed on inactive status. After the Peace of Tilsit, he studied law in Göttingen and in Heidelberg and in 1812 was appointed a junior lawyer with the Potsdam government.

After King Frederick William III’s proclamation An Mein Volk (‘To my People’) which appealed for support against Napoleon, Gerlach was reactivated in the army as a second lieutenant and assigned to General Blücher's staff. During the Wars of Liberation he took part in the battles at Großgörschen, Bautzen, Katzbach, Leipzig, La Rothière, Paris, Ligny and Wavre. Gerlach was wounded several times and awarded both classes of the Iron Cross. In October 1815 he joined the Great General Staff as a captain and from 30 March 1821 served as a major on the General Staff of the III Army Corps.

In 1826 he was appointed adjutant to Prince Wilhelm of Prussia (later Emperor Wilhelm I), whose pietistic and conservative views he shared. In 1838 Gerlach became colonel and chief of the general staff of the III Army Corps. He was commander of the 1st Guards Landwehr Brigade from August to September 1842. In 1844 he became a major general, and in 1849 a lieutenant general and adjutant general to King Frederick William IV. In this position of trust, his work was part of the contemporary ecclesiastical and political reaction that followed the March Revolution of 1848. His last rank was General of the Infantry, beginning in May 1859.

== Family ==
In 1819, at Redel in Pomerania, he married Johanna von Küssow (1796–1857), daughter of Count Friedrich Bernd von Küssow (1746–1802) and Ulrike von Bardeleben, who was a daughter of Georg Friedrich Christoph von Bardeleben, a Prussian lieutenant general. The couple had two sons and two daughters. Berndt (1828–1889) became a district administrator and from 1886 to 1889 was a member of the Prussian House of Representatives.

== Politics ==
With his brother Ernst Ludwig von Gerlach, he was a member of the Christian-Germanic Table Society, which was anti-Semitic and influenced by the political ideas of Karl Ludwig von Haller, then later of the successor movement known as the Maikäferei. In 1824 he cofounded the Berlin Missionary Society with August von Bethmann-Hollweg, August Neander and others in Berlin. In 1848 the Gerlach brothers (Otto, Ernst Ludwig, Ludwig Friedrich and Wilhelm) were among the most influential founders of the Prussian Conservative Party, the monarchist Kreuzzeitung newspaper and of the court party, the so-called camarilla, around Frederick William IV. Their goal was a Christian, estates-based order in Prussia and Germany. The radicalism with which the Gerlach brothers strived for this ideal led to the rapid splitting of the conservative movement, in the course of which Otto von Bismarck and others turned away from the Gerlachs' stance.

Leopold von Gerlach died in 1861 as a result of a cold he contracted at the funeral of Frederick William IV.

== Estate ==
A large part of Leopold von Gerlach's estate, which was kept in the Stettin State Archives, was lost in 1945 during World War II. Another part of the estate is kept in the Gerlach Archive at the University of Erlangen-Nuremberg and is accessible for research.

== Sources ==
- "Герлах, Леопольд" . Brockhaus and Efron Encyclopedic Dictionary (in Russian). 1906.
