= 1874 German federal election =

- 10 January 1874

All 397 seats in the Reichstag 199 seats needed for a majority
- Registered: 8,523,446 ▲11.33%
- Turnout: 5,219,830 (61.24%) ▲10.23pp
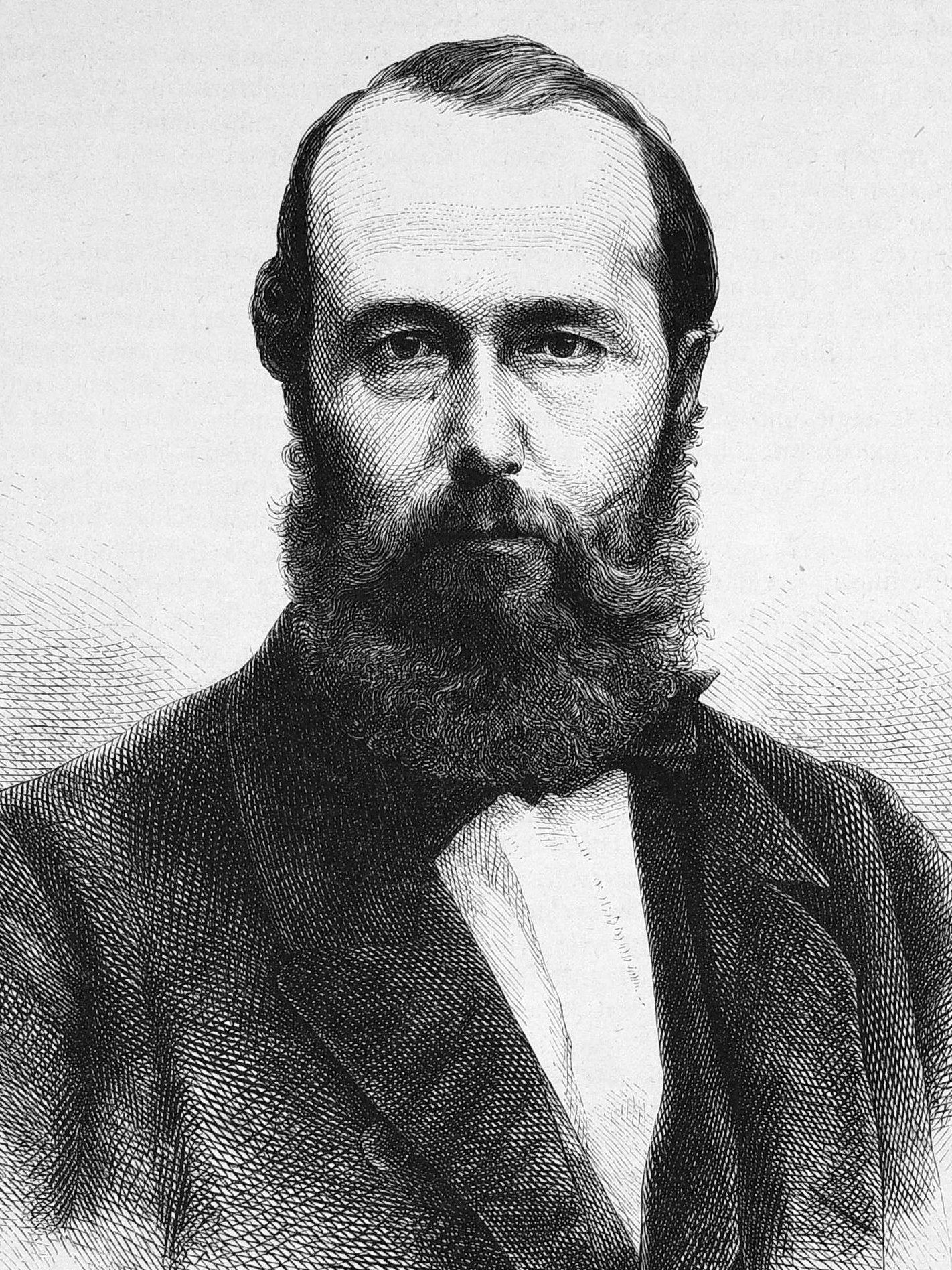

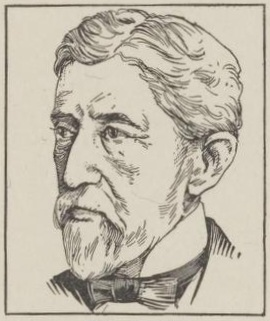

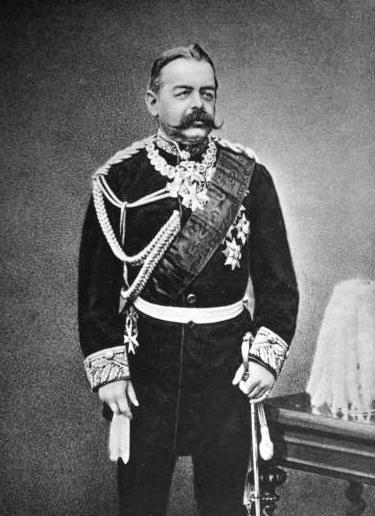
	First party	Second party	Third party
			DFP
Leader	Rudolf von Bennigsen	Hermann von Mallinckrodt
Party	NlP	Centre	DFP
Leader since	1867	1870
Last election	28.97%, 117 seats	18.21%, 58 seats	9.04%, 45 seats
Seats won	147	91	48
Seat change	▲30	▲33	▲3
Popular vote	1,394,250	1,438,792	458,133
Percentage	26.86%	27.72%	8.83%
Swing	▼2.11 pp	▲9.51 pp	▼0.21 pp
	Fourth party	Fifth party	Sixth party
		Con	PPP
Leader	Viktor I, Duke of Ratibor
Party	DRP	Conservatives	Polish Party
Last election	8.83%, 37 seats	13.51%, 56 seats	4.54%, 13 seats
Seats won	32	21	14
Seat change	▼5	▼35	▲1
Popular vote	388,840	352,050	208,797
Percentage	7.49%	6.78%	4.02%
Swing	▼1.34 pp	▼6.73 pp	▼0.52 pp
- Map of results (by constituencies)
President of the Reichstag before election
Eduard von Simson
Independent
President of the Reichstag after election
Max von Forckenbeck
NlP

A federal election for the second Reichstag of the German Empire was held on 10 January 1874. The National Liberal Party remained the largest party in the Reichstag, with 147 of the 397 seats. The Centre Party, which had campaigned against the anti-Catholic laws introduced by the government of Chancellor Otto von Bismarck, was able to double its vote total from the previous election and placed second. The Conservative and Imperial Liberal parties lost the most seats.

== Historical background ==
The most significant political event to affect the 1874 election was the start in July 1871 of the Kulturkampf (Cultural Struggle), an attempt to suppress the political power of Catholicism in Germany. Chancellor Otto von Bismarck feared that Catholics' loyalty lay more with the Vatican than Germany, and many liberals saw the Catholic Church as politically reactionary. Although the majority of the anti-Catholic laws affected only Prussia, they were nevertheless a major concern for all German Catholics since Prussia accounted for about two-thirds of the German population.

One of Bismarck's chief goals in the Kulturkampf was to break the Catholic Centre Party. Catholics made up about one-third of both Prussia's and the Empire's population, and the Centre Party, which had been founded only in December 1870, had placed second in the 1871 election with 58 seats. Catholics were most heavily concentrated in the Imperial Territory of Alsace–Lorraine, which had just been won from France in the Franco-Prussian War, in Bavaria, Baden, and the Prussian provinces of Rhineland, Westphalia and heavily Polish Posen.

== Electoral system ==
The election was held under general, equal, direct and secret suffrage. All German males over the age of 25 years were able to vote except for active members of the military and recipients of poor relief. The restrictions on the military were meant to keep it from becoming politicized, while men on relief were considered to be open to political manipulation. The constitutional guarantee of a secret vote was not safeguarded at the time, since ballot boxes and polling booths were not introduced until 1903.

If no candidate in a district won an absolute majority of the votes, a runoff election was held between the first- and second-place finishers. It was possible for a replacement candidate to be introduced in a runoff.

== Results ==
The major gainers in the 1874 election were the National Liberal Party and the Centre Party; losses affected primarily the Conservative Party and the short-lived Imperial Liberal Party.

Rather than suppressing the Catholic vote, the Kulturkampf served to consolidate political Catholicism. The Centre Party more than doubled the number votes it had received in 1871, from just under 708,000 to over 1.4 million. It was the most votes of any party, although the Centre won 56 fewer seats than the National Liberals. Such a result was possible under the Empire's electoral system if a party was more successful at winning majorities in individual districts and/or won more runoff elections. There were 46 runoffs for the 397 seats in 1874.

1874 was the first year that representatives from Alsace–Lorraine were elected to the Reichstag. All 15 opposed the German annexation of the region.

Graph of the party split among 397 seats.
Party	Votes	%	+/–	Seats	+/–
Centre Party	1,438,792	27.72	+9.51	91	+33
National Liberal Party	1,394,250	26.86	−2.11	147	+30
German Progress Party	458,133	8.83	−0.21	48	+3
German Reich Party	388,840	7.49	−1.34	32	−5
Conservative Party	352,050	6.78	−6.73	21	−35
Alsace-Lorraine parties	234,545	4.52	New	15	New
Polish Party	208,797	4.02	−0.52	14	+1
General German Workers' Association	179,250	3.45	+2.01	3	+3
Social Democratic Workers' Party	171,873	3.31	+2.25	7	+6
Imperial Liberal Party	98,072	1.89	−5.16	8	−25
German-Hanoverian Party	73,436	1.41	−1.48	4	−3
Independent liberals	69,905	1.35	−0.58	4	−1
German People's Party	39,110	0.75	−0.01	1	0
Independent conservatives	21,546	0.42	+0.04	1	0
Danish Party	19,856	0.38	−0.16	1	0
Schleswig-Holstein Particularist Liberals	13,945	0.27	+0.09	0	−2
Old Liberals	8,937	0.17	−0.47	0	−2
Others	18,806	0.36	+0.21	0	0
Unknown	111	0.00	−0.02	0	0
Total	5,190,254	100.00	–	397	+15
Valid votes	5,190,254	99.43			
Invalid/blank votes	29,576	0.57			
Total votes	5,219,830	100.00			
Registered voters/turnout	8,523,446	61.24			
Source: Wahlen in Deutschland

=== Alsace-Lorraine ===
Party	Votes	%	Seats	+/–
Clericals	106,106	43.86	9	New
Protesters	83,082	34.35	6	New
Autonomists	45,357	18.75	0	New
National Liberal Party	5,072	2.10	0	0
Social Democratic Workers' Party	680	0.28	0	0
Others	1,605	0.66	0	0
Total	241,902	100.00	15	New
Valid votes	241,902	99.08		
Invalid/blank votes	2,252	0.92		
Total votes	244,154	100.00		
Registered voters/turnout	319,477	76.42		
Source: Wahlen in Deutschland
