= August Neander =

German theologian and church historian (1789–1850)

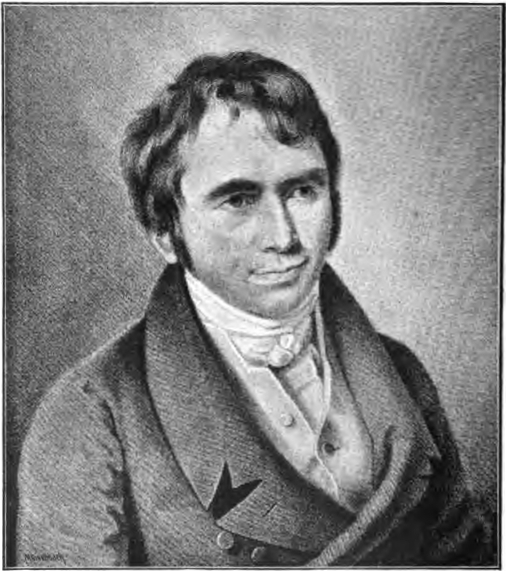
August Neander

Johann August Wilhelm Neander (17 January 1789 – 14 July 1850) was a German theologian and church historian.

== Early life ==
Neander was born in Göttingen as David Mendel. His father, Emmanuel Mendel, was said to have been a Jewish peddler. While very young, his parents separated and he moved with his mother to Hamburg. After completing grammar school (Johanneum), he enrolled in a gymnasium where he discovered Plato. Some of his fellow students included Wilhelm Neumann, writer Karl August Varnhagen von Ense, and poet Adelbert von Chamisso.

== Conversion from Judaism to Christianity ==
Neander's conversion from Judaism to Christianity was the largest change in his life and had a heavy impact upon both himself and his writing. Neander, along with his brothers and sisters, followed later by their mother, eventually left the synagogue and embraced Christianity. In his own personal conversion, Neander was influenced by the Apostle John, due to the similarity in the sentiment of John's writings to those of Plato.

Neander's conversion has been likened to the conversion of Saint Paul of Tarsus, due to the impact that his new faith had on his person, his work, his relationship with his students, and his attitude toward church history.

He was baptized on 25 February 1806 at the age of 17 and adopted the name of Neander, or "new man" on becoming a Protestant Christian.

== Studies ==
Neander studied divinity at the University of Halle under Friedrich Schleiermacher. Before the end of his first year, the events of the War of the Fourth Coalition forced Neander to move to Göttingen where he continued his studies, specialising in Plato and Plutarch, and studying theology under GJ Planck. At this point Neander decided that the original investigation of Christian history would form the great work of his life.

After university, he returned to Hamburg and passed his examination for the Christian ministry. However, after eighteen months, he decided on an academic career at Heidelberg where two vacancies had occurred in the theological faculty of the university. He became a teacher of theology in 1811 and became a professor the following year.

== Writings ==
At this time, Neander published his first monograph, Über den Kaiser Julianus und sein Zeitalter. The following year he was called to University of Berlin, where he was appointed Professor of Theology. His pupils included Edmond de Pressensé.

He published a second monograph, Der Heilige Bernhard und sein Zeitalter in 1813, and a third Gnosticism in 1818 (Genetische Entwickelung der vornehmsten gnostischen Systeme). A more extended monograph followed in 1822, Der Heilige Johannes Chrysostomus und die Kirche besonders des Orients in dessen Zeitalter, with one on Tertullian in 1824 (Antignostikus). In 1824 he also cofounded the Berlin Missionary Society with Ludwig Friedrich Leopold von Gerlach, August von Bethmann-Hollweg and others in Berlin.

Neander began his work on Christian history in 1824 and published the first volume of Allgemeine Geschichte der christlichen Religion und Kirche in 1825. The other volumes followed at intervals with the fifth in 1842, focusing on the period of Boniface VIII. A posthumous volume published in 1852, finished with the period of the Council of Basel.

While working on these volumes, Neander also published several other books including;

- Geschichte der Pflanzung und Leitung der christlichen Kirche durch die Apostel (1832)
- Das Leben Jesu Christi, in seinem geschichilichen Zusammenhang und seiner geschichtlichen Entwickelung (1837) (after Das Leben Jesu of David Strauss).
- Denkwürdigkeiten aus der Geschichte des Christentums (1823-1824, 2 vols., 1825, 3 vols., 1846)
- Das Eine und Mannichfaltige des christlichen Lebens (1840)
- Various papers on Plotinus, Thomas Aquinas, Theobald Thamer, Blaise Pascal, John Henry Newman, Blanco White and Thomas Arnold, and other occasional pieces (Kleine Gelegenheitsschriften, 1829).

Several of his books went through multiple editions and were translated into English.

== Death ==
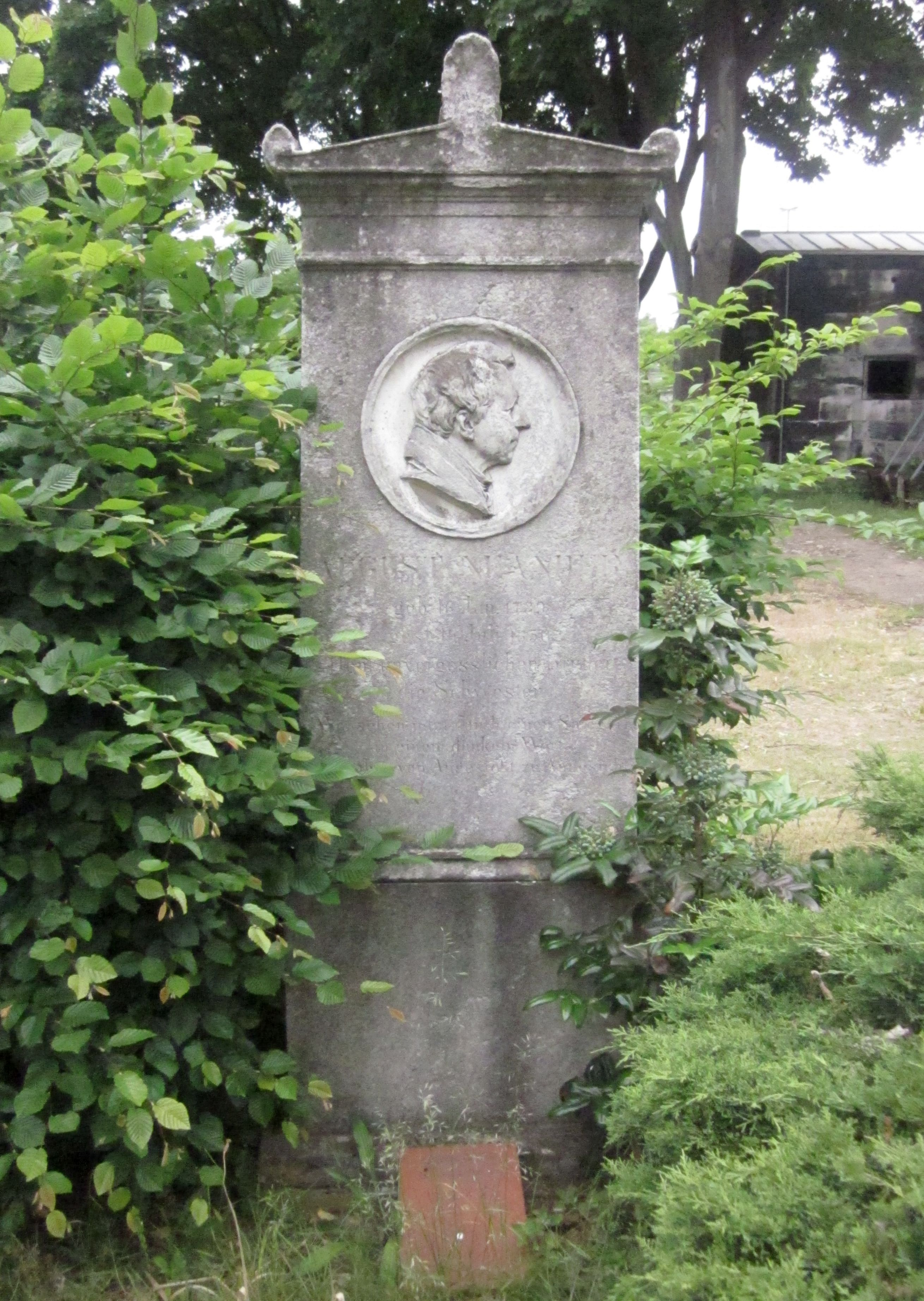
Gravesite of August Neander at Friedhof I Jerusalems- und Neue Kirche in Berlin-Kreuzberg

Neander died in Berlin on 14 July 1850, worn out and nearly blind. He died whilst dictating a page of his General History of the Christian Religion and Church.

His grave is preserved in the Protestant Friedhof I der Jerusalems – und Neuen Kirchengemeinde (Cemetery No. I of the congregations of Jerusalem's Church and New Church) in Berlin-Kreuzberg, south of Hallesches Tor.

After his death, five volumes representing his various lecture series on the History of Dogma (Theologische Vorlesungen) were edited by Justus Ludwig Jacobi in 1857–64.

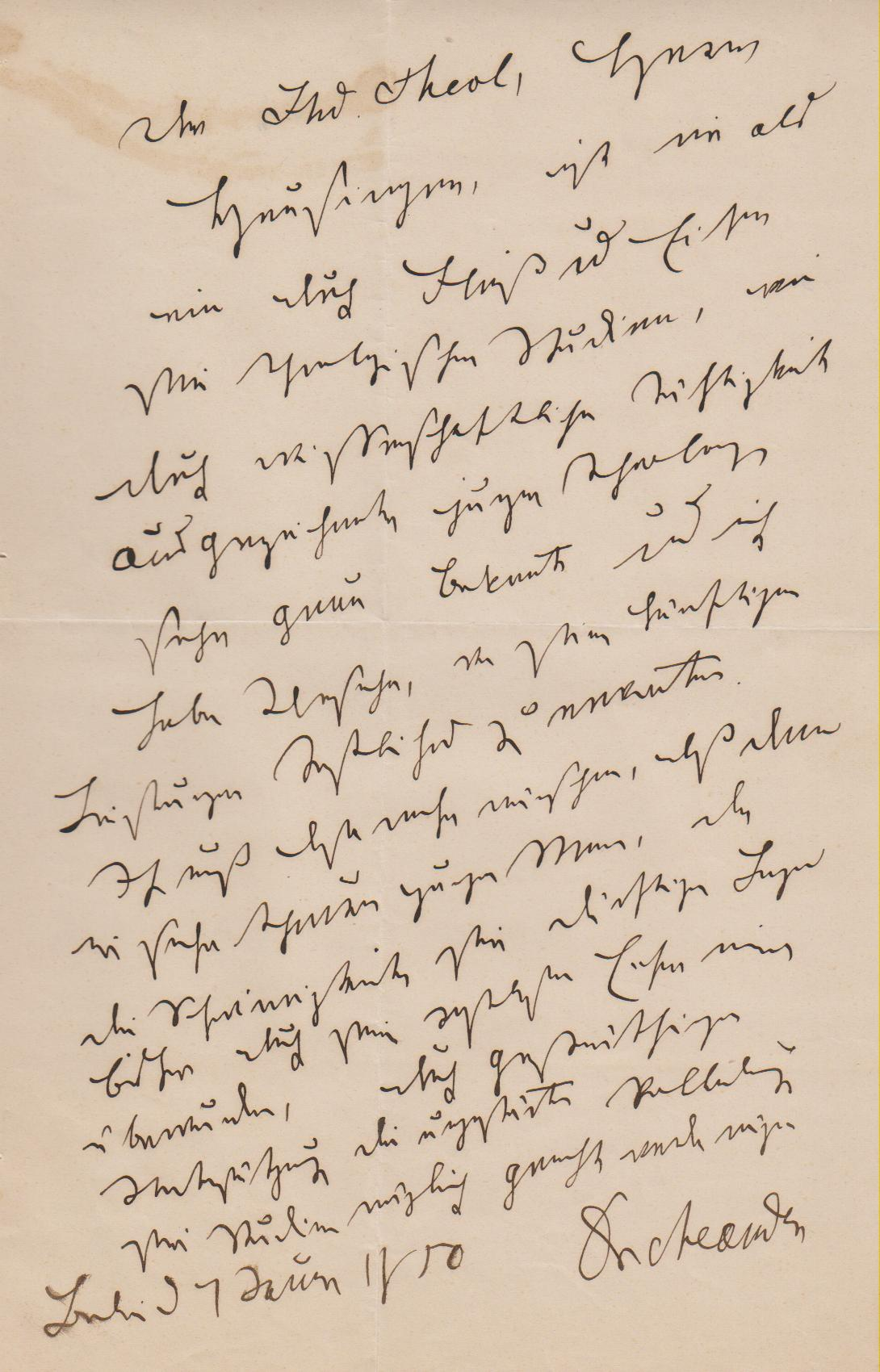
Neander's own handwritten letter

== Personal influences ==
Shortly after Neander's birth, his mother Esther divorced her husband and moved the family to Hamburg where they experienced a great deal of poverty. However, Neander cherished this period in his life and described it in endearing terms as “men in all ages who… have been indebted to their pious mothers” for planting the seeds of faith in their hearts.

This period in Neander's life had a profound effect on both his personal faith and his attitude towards life in general. Neander was often described as ‘wide-hearted’, ‘truthful’, ‘sincere’, ‘free from all the stuff of vanity’, ‘affectionate’, ‘innocent and pure of heart’.

Neander felt indebted to his teacher and later his friend and colleague Schleiermacher.

To exhibit the history of the church of Christ, as a living witness of the divine power of Christianity; as a school of Christian experience; a voice, a sounding through the ages, of instruction, of doctrine, and of reproof, for all who are disposed to listen.

== Church history ==
Neander's principal work was the General History of the Christian Religion and Church (Allgemeine Geschichte der christlichen Religion und Kirche). Each volume contrasted an era of ecclesiastical history with the church in Neander's own time.

His guiding principle in dealing both with history and with the contemporary condition of the church was "that Christianity has room for the various tendencies of human nature, and aims at permeating and glorifying them all; that according to the divine plan these various tendencies are to occur successively and simultaneously and to counterbalance each other, so that the freedom and variety of the development of the spiritual life ought not to be forced into a single dogmatic form" (Otto Pfleiderer).

== Bibliography ==
- Hogg, James (1851). "Portrait Gallery – Neander – Second Paper". Hogg's Instructor. 7 – via Google Books.
- Neander, Augustus (1854). General History of the Christian Religion and Church. Translated From the Second and Improved Edition by Joseph Torrey. Vol. First. Crocker & Brewster – via Google Books.
- Schaff, Philip (1886). Saint Augustin, Melancthon, Neander: Three Biographies. Funk & Wagnalis – via Google Books.
