= Friedrich Julius Stahl =

German lawyer and politician

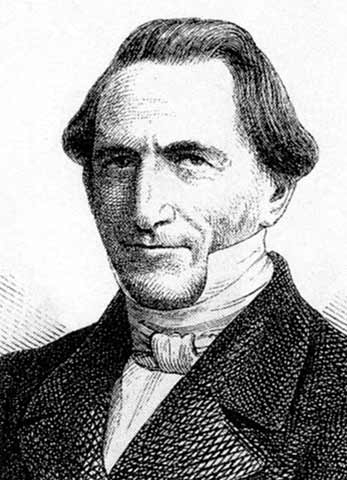
- Friedrich Julius Stahl
- Born: Joël Jolson; 16 January 1802; Würzburg, Prince-Bishopric of Würzburg, Holy Roman Empire
- Died: 10 August 1861 (aged 59); Bad Brückenau, Kingdom of Bavaria, German Confederation
- Occupations: Jurist, Philosopher
- Political party: Conservative Party (Prussia)

Philosophical work
- Era: 19th-century philosophy
- Region: Western philosophy
- School: Conservatism; Monarchism; Counter-Enlightenment; German historical school
- Main interests: Political philosophy; Legal philosophy
- Notable works: The Philosophy of Law from a Historical Perspective; The Monarchical Principle
- Notable ideas: That Duties arises from Rights; Vocation; Divine Order; Innate Rights and Acquired Rights; The Origin of Rights; Rationalist Liberalism; Two branches of Ethics: Personal Ethics and Social Ethics

Friedrich Julius Stahl (German: [ʃtaːl]; 16 January 1802 – 10 August 1861) was a German constitutional lawyer, political philosopher and politician.

== Biography ==
Born at Würzburg in the Prince-Bishopric of Würzburg, of Jewish parentage, as Julius Jolson, he was brought up strictly in the Jewish religion and was allowed to attend the Gymnasium. As a result of its influence, he at the age of 17 converted to Christianity and was baptized in the Lutheran Church at Erlangen on November 6, 1819. To his new faith, he clung with earnest devotion and persistence until his death. Having studied law at Würzburg, Heidelberg and Erlangen, Stahl, he on taking the degree of doctor juris established himself as Privatdozent in Munich, was appointed in 1832 ordinary professor of law at Würzburg and received in 1840 the chair of ecclesiastical law and polity at Berlin.

There, he immediately made his mark as an ecclesiastical lawyer, and he was appointed a member of the first chamber of the general synod. Elected in 1850 a member of the short-lived Erfurt Parliament, he bitterly opposed the idea of German federation. Stahl early fell under the influence of Friedrich Wilhelm Joseph Schelling and, at the latter's insistence, began in 1827 his great work Die Philosophie des Rechts nach geschichtlicher Ansicht, a historical view of the philosophy of law. The second definitive edition of that work, published in 1845, was entitled Rechts- und Staatslehre auf der Grundlage christlicher Weltanschauung ("The Philosophy of Law and State on the Basis of the Christian Worldview"). It is sometimes claimed that in that work he bases all law and political science upon Christian revelation, but that is a serious misunderstanding of his position. As he put it in Book 1 of that work, "Christian revelation is indifferent to [the civil order]. This revelation provides regulations governing man’s behavior in relation to the existing order, but it does not give instructions about the formation of this order. No divine image of the civil order is given, because the way it is, is not of God". He advocated a confessional Christian state and the establishment of the Christian Church.

That position was further elucidated in his Der christliche Staat und sein Verhältniss zum Deismus und Judenthum (The Christian State and Its Relation to Deism and Judaism; 1847). As Oberkirchenrath (synodal councillor), Stahl used all his influence to weaken the Prussian Union of Churches, the compromise between the Calvinist and the Lutheran doctrines that is the essence of the Evangelical Church in Prussia) and to strengthen the influence of the Lutheran Church (Die Lutherische Kirche und die Union, 1859). Stahl advocated the formation of an episcopal constitution of the Lutherans similar to that of the Roman Catholics or the Anglicans.

The Prussian minister von Bunsen attacked Stahl, but King Frederick William IV supported Stahl in his ecclesiastical policy, and the Prussian Union would probably have been dissolved if the regency of Prince William (afterwards William I, German Emperor) had not come in 1858. Stahl's influence fell under the new régime, and he remained remaining a member of the Prussian House of Lords ("Herrenhaus"), but he resigned his seat on the general synod.

While taking a cure, he unexpectedly died at Bad Brückenau.

== Academic work ==
In 1827 Stahl habilitated in Munich on the older Roman right of action and received a private lecturer position there. In the winter semester of 1827/28 he began lectures on Roman law and the philosophy of law. For unknown reasons, his father Valentin had lost most of his fortune, and after the death of his parents (1829/1830), Stahl had to look after his seven younger siblings. He applied in vain for a paid lecturer position.

In order to counteract the liberal Bayerisches Volksblatt published in Würzburg by Gottfried Eisenmann, the Bavarian government founded the official magazine Der Thron- und Volksfreund in 1830 and appointed Stahl as its editor. Even at this time, his thinking and his journalistic and political activities were anti-rationalistic and anti-revolutionary and fully corresponded to King Ludwig I's monarchical principle . But the "Volksfreund" was no match for the "Volksblatt" and was discontinued after just a few months and only eight issues.

After several applications were rejected by Ludwig I, despite the support of Minister Eduard von Schenk, Stahl was finally appointed associate professor in Erlangen by decree of June 27, 1832. But before the beginning of the winter semester 1832/33 he was transferred to Würzburg and appointed full professor for legal philosophy, pandects and Bavarian state law, which he was not at all happy about: his subjects did not quite correspond to his wishes and he could not feel comfortable in the Catholic-dominated environment. Nonetheless, he twice turned down a call by the Hessian Minister Ludwig Hassenpflug to the University of Marburg because he felt committed to Bavaria. In 1834 Stahl returned to the University of Erlangen, where he taught canon law, constitutional law and philosophy of law, and in 1835 married Julie Kindler, daughter of a glove manufacturer from Erlangen; the marriage remained childless. Under the influence of Christian Krafft and Erlangen theology, Stahl finally developed into a typical representative of Lutheran orthodoxy, and in 1837 the University of Erlangen elected him as its deputy to the second chamber of the Bavarian state parliament, where he advocated better equipment for the universities, organized a faction-like group to represent Protestant interests and, in the budget debate, was willing to compromise with the government on the matter, but defended the constitutional rights of the state parliament in principle until the chamber majority and eventually joined Minister Wallerstein. As a result, King Ludwig I dismissed the minister and reprimanded Stahl by withdrawing his professorship for constitutional law and transferring him to civil procedural law, which was alien to him. Stahl therefore rejected re-election to the state parliament, used the calm thus gained to work out his work on the church constitution and was now - although his Erlangen colleagues appointed him pro-rector in 1839.

In 1840 Stahl was appointed professor of legal philosophy, constitutional law and canon law in Berlin. At the request of Friedrich Wilhelm IV, he was to fight "rationalist" Hegelianism at the university. During his inaugural lecture on November 26, Stahl announced this intention and caused a scandal. Treitschke calls the reception "vulgar". In his diaries, Varnhagen van Ense describes the "shuffling and hissing of the students" as the "first opposition to the new government." Stahl called out to the protesting students: "Gentlemen, I am here to teach, you to listen, you may judge at home, but do not disturb the order and tranquility here!" As early as 1841, Stahl was in the adjudication board of the law faculty, in which he prepared expert opinions on constitutional and canonical cases. As a professor, he gathered conservative students around him and, when he was dean and rector, influenced the appointments to chairs in conservative interests. In a report by the law faculty, he spoke out against the admission of Jews as lecturers. Stahl also formulated the rejection of the invitation to a meeting of university teachers in September of the revolutionary year 1848 because he was against recognition by the Frankfurt central government. From the winter semester of 1850/51 he held public lectures on the current parties in state and church, to which high officials and officers, and even ministers, also came.

== Political activity ==
Although Stahl's activity within the university was already politically significant, this was by no means enough for his political ambitions. After 1848 a petition by the associate professors and private lecturers at the University of Berlin demanded the dismissal of e.g. Stahls had also demanded, he left Berlin in a hurry, but soon returned to promote the founding of a conservative newspaper and the organization of the later Conservative Party together with Ernst Ludwig von Gerlach. Stahl was one of the shareholders and employees of the "Neue Preußische Zeitung" founded in mid-1848. His article "The Banner of the Conservatives" printed in it on July 20, 1848 was an abridged version of his writing Das monarchisches Princip from 1845, but updated and specified: From Friedrich Wilhelm IV's proclamation of March 18, he led a further development of the Prussian constitutional reality by the king. Other articles by Stahl followed at short intervals, until in September he began to concentrate on building a party organization. His Draft for a Conservative Party, written in February and March 1849, in which he outlined the guidelines for future Conservative policy, became the basis for the Conservative program that was eventually printed.

However, Stahl could not commit the entire Conservative Party to this program; so he became - again at the side of Ernst Ludwig von Gerlach - spokesman only for the extreme parliamentary right (sometimes referred to as the "Gerlach-Stahl Group"). Elected to the first chamber for the district of Oberbarnim in 1849, he nevertheless succeeded in winning over the "high conservatives" of the "Kreuzzeitung Party" to accept the program in principle, although they were striving to have it revised. Eventually, in 1854, Stahl became one of the members of the Prussian House of Lords appointed for life by the king, and thus the chief spokesman for the chivalric faction, to which he remained loyal to the end.

In the state house of the Erfurt union parliament in 1850 he acted against the plan for a Lesser German solution to the national question under Prussian leadership because he did not want to have done anything against the Habsburgs, in whom he still saw a legitimate candidate for the imperial crown. The failure of Union policy as a result of the Olomouc punctuation was just fine with him; thus the understanding in the Holy Alliance with Austria and Russia was restored. Out of this spirit he also campaigned for Prussian neutrality in the Crimean War in 1854, as Bunsen and other partisans of England urged Frederick William IV to intervene. The King had promised in 1840: "I will keep peace in my time" and kept this now. Prussia had deliberately remained neutral, and Stahl justified this in a speech before the first chamber as "the conclusion of a policy based on a higher principle". In 1854 Stahl also became Prussian Crown Counsel and a member of the State Council.

In the ecclesiastical field, too, Stahl used his position as a member of the old Prussian Evangelical Higher Church Council (1852–1858) to loosen the union, to strengthen Lutheran confessionalism (New Lutheranism) and to renew the rule of the clergy over the lay world. He was a member of the Prussian General Synod in 1846 and (alongside August von Bethmann-Hollweg ) Vice-President of the German Evangelical Church Congress from 1848 to 1861 and a member of the Central Committee for the Inner Mission in Prussia. It may be due to the influence of Catholicism during his time in Würzburg, when he was fascinated by the authoritarian elements of the hierarchical church constitution, that Stahl demanded that the validity of the Lutheran confession as the supreme norm of all church life be ensured with the help of a largely independent Episcopalian church organization. The office of bishop was finally introduced in the EKD after 1945.

The political upheaval as a result of the king's illness and the rebellion of Prince Regent Wilhelm and the fall of the Manteuffel ministry also ended Stahl's work in the Oberkirchenrat and led to his resignation from the authority in 1858. However, he continued the political struggle against the Ministry of the Liberal Era in the Herrenhaus, but did not live to see its political turnaround.

== State doctrine ==
At the end of the 1820s, Stahl was in a difficult, crisis-ridden situation in Munich: not only materially - he had to earn a living for himself and his siblings - he was also in distress mentally, as he explained in December 1829 in the preface to the writes the first edition of the Philosophy of Law, which is so important to him that he adopts it in its entirety in later editions. Dissatisfied with Hegel's teaching, he felt the misery of philosophy in being unable to provide an ethical basis for the law he had to teach. Eventually he found that the history of the philosophy of law showed him the way in its development, and that Schelling's thinking was confirmed and strengthened. However, Stahl did not see himself as a disciple of Schelling.

A second figure he could draw on was Savigny, the father of the historical school of law. He recognized the right thing intuitively, but others needed a legal philosophy as a theoretical basis. This had been neglected, and Stahl wanted to set himself the task of justifying the views of the historical school of law theoretically, namely in terms of ethics, without following the natural law doctrine of the Enlightenment. Rather, he wanted to base himself on the traditional Christian views - and above all with his work to give "rationalism an eternal monument (i.e. gravestone)."

Stahl begins the introduction to his main work with the succinct definition: "Legal philosophy is the science of the just." Since previous attempts cannot go unnoticed, the first volume of the genesis of legal philosophy is dedicated. "The historical course, the real nature of people is the judgment on the motives of all philosophy, and thus on philosophy itself. Science, like the saint in the legend (Christophorus), must seek the strongest lord...With every system, the question is not so much which institutions it declares to be just, what is just for it and where it gets its knowledge from." Beginning with the Greeks, through the Middle Ages and the theory of natural law, Stahl finally reaches the pragmatic (Machiavelli and Montesquieu) and speculative (Hegel and Schelling) to the "writers of the counter-revolution" and to historical legal philosophy.

The second volume of the "Philosophy of Law" was published in 1833, i.e. after the July Revolution of 1830. The experience of the revolution was formative for Stahl. He absolutely rejected the revolution and was convinced that everything could be done to prevent it, to prevent it. The revolution for Stahl already begins with rationalism, with the fact that man is no longer satisfied with knowing God about himself, but wants to set standards himself, using his reason. And if you let rationalism run its course, Stahl believed, it would inevitably lead to permanent revolution, because since God is supposed to have been overthrown, you are not satisfied with a constitution, nor with the overthrow of the monarch and the establishment of a republic. Rather, property will finally be abolished and all the foundations of order in society will be eliminated, including the freedom of the individual and human dignity - there will be "hell on earth".

Like the revolution in a negative sense, religion shaped Stahl in a positive sense. He grew up religiously in the house of the head of a Jewish community. But this religiosity was soon no longer enough for him. Thiersch's influence was decisive for him at high school. The Lutheran Protestant from the environment of the President of the Bavarian Academy of Sciences, Friedrich Heinrich Jacobi, convinced him, and Stahl converted to Lutheranism. Later, as a professor in Würzburg, which was completely dominated by Catholicism, Stahl suffered from it and became insecure. It was only Krafft's theology in Erlangen that strengthened him again and formed him into an orthodox Lutheran. Was he a pietist? Stahl denied this, as he understood Pietism as apolitical, whereas he was political.

In principle, Stahl professed to be a follower of the historical school of law, in that he did not accuse her and Savigny of errors, but only the lack of an ethical foundation through a legal philosophy that he himself tried to create. Namely by the fact that he saw what had grown historically as the result of God's rule and based it on God's will as the standard for the good. Law should have the divine commandments as a basis. On this basis, he explained that law should continue to be developed organically and historically in the spirit of God. State and church are institutions created by men, but they should serve a greater purpose. In the state, a moral kingdom was to be established, not identical with the eternal "kingdom of God", but in time, in history, the preliminary stage to it. In 1837 Stahl wrote: "Thus the state is the conductor of divine influences upon the outward condition of men. He should order it in God's stead, promote it, punish violations of the order, but in doing so also prove the morally reasonable will of the human community, i.e. their obedience to establishing and administering God's order." Based on his belief in the personal God as the supreme principle, Stahl also postulated a personality at the head of the state: the monarch. However, the monarch should not stand above the state, but serve it, complying with the constitution and laws and leading the state to fulfill the tasks set by God.

Stahl based his worldview not on logical necessity (like Hegel), but on the free personality of the revealed God. State and monarch are committed to something higher and have to work in that spirit. The foundation of Stahl's philosophy, which was strongly influenced by Schelling but also by Hegel, is the belief in a personal God, in the ruler of history. Guided by him, the "personality" unfolds in the religious-moral area as an individual, as a believer in the church community and as a citizen in the civil order of the "moral world", overarched by the state, the moral kingdom. The latter for Stahl was normatively determined by Christianity. For Stahl, the state was not a contractual structure, but rather the authority appointed by God; like the individual, the state as a personality strives towards morality. It is clear that this "Christian state" cannot know the Hegelian separation of state and society. Rather, the state is an association of a people under a rule (authority). This kingdom lives from monarchical authority, but is not a theocratic dictatorship. The monarch is "bound" as it has been throughout Lutheran political doctrine since its inception. Stahl's ethicized legal concept brings authority and freedom, monarchical principle and ideal "people" into balance, at least verbally.

It follows from sovereignty that the prince is wholly and indivisibly entitled to exercise state power. Since responsibility is part of power, the prince also has the sole legislative initiative, the right to use the revenue and the right to convene the parliament of the people. In the event of constitutional conflicts between the chamber and the government, he has the absolute veto of final decision. But it is his duty to subordinate his interests to the state and to respect the rights of his subjects. The duty of the subjects is obedience and love for the legitimate authorities, devotion and sacrifice for the state. Their right is, first, the right to freedom of religion, teaching, and property; for the state as a highly imperfect institution, as the realm of the Fall of Man, can only stand negatively, only protectively, over everything that arises from within the individual. These living conditions could only be fulfilled in a higher unity, in that of God's commandments, which worked directly in the souls of his creatures. However, the rights of the subjects were not exhausted with this negative status. Since they are free creatures, they must not only obey, but also agree. The ruler's will must become their own free will. Stahl therefore demanded a people's representative body that could approve laws and taxes or reject them, that would monitor proper financial management, the constitutional implementation of laws, and just administration of justice, and thus become the guardian and guarantor of human freedom. It must be a popular representation, so Stahl rejected feudal estates. But it should reflect the actual balance of power; hence Stahl was for universal but against equal suffrage and for a House of Lords. The representatives of the people have not just an advisory, but a decision-making voice and must be heard. Since it stands on a legal basis, it can resist, but only passively.

== Reception ==
=== Contemporary ===
There was already criticism from Stahl's contemporaries: The historian and politician Friedrich Christoph Dahlmann criticized that Stahl only wanted to grant freedom in "homeopathic droplet particles." The liberal politician and political scientist Robert von Mohl counted Stahl among the opponents of the rule of law and advocates of a theocracy. Eduard Wippermann dedicated an appendix to Stahl in his work Die Altorientalischen Religionenstaaten, published in 1851, because he saw him as the representative of the doctrine of the "Christian state" who was the only one who "scientifically processed these doctrines in a comprehensive system", and stated that it was easiest to govern in the religious state. The constitutional lawyer Rudolf Gneist also said ironically that Stahl's personality and way of life was in "sharp contrast" to that of his "party comrades".

=== Imperial Era ===
The conservative historian Heinrich von Treitschke certified Stahl that he had become "completely Christian and German", called him a pioneer of national unity and the "only great political mind among all thinkers of Jewish blood". In the Wilhelmine Empire, legal positivism had prevailed and Stahl was largely forgotten, at best found historical interest, for example with Erich Kaufmann, while Laband paid no attention to Stahl in his Constitutional law of the German Reich in 1876.

=== Nazi Era ===
In National Socialist Germany, following Reich Minister of the Interior Hans Frank, e.g. Johannes Heckel ("The intrusion of the Jewish spirit into German constitutional and canon law by Friedrich Julius Stahl") and Edgar Tatarin-Tarnheyden (because of the "atomization of state power") Stahl was considered the "alien." To Carl Schmitt, Stahl was "the boldest in" a "Jewish front", who paralyzed Prussia and was responsible for the downfall of the Hohenzollerns. On the other hand, writers in exile spoke positively or differently about Stahl's teachings; the young Peter F. Drucker published a praising essay on Stahl in Tübingen in April 1933, shortly before he had to leave Germany.

=== Since 1945 ===
After 1945, Stahl's doctrines, along with criticism, continued to appeal to Christian conservative politicians, historians such as Hans-Joachim Schoeps and Lutheran church representatives such as Otto Dibelius into the 1960s. In 1949 Fritz Fischer particularly emphasized the danger of the pseudo-liberal concessions in Stahl's state theory; with the help of his constitutional compromise, the necessary parliamentary reform of the German system of government was prevented by the end of the First World War . His authoritarian views had decisively determined the thinking of the leading conservative Protestant leadership elites in Prussia-Germany in the state, in the church, in society and at the universities up to the First World War and beyond, thereby contributing to the downfall of the Weimar Republic with its consequences. "The story of the 'counter-revolution of science' was not with FJ Stahl, it was not finished in 1918." In 1963, Dieter Grosser recognized Stahl's theory of the state as a significant contribution to overcoming the state-theoretical and constitutional-political problems of his time and also recognized its legal-philosophical foundations as having lasting academic value. In particular, he worked out the religious-ethical, legal and political structure of the "moral realm of personal character", the central concept of Stahl's legal and political philosophy, and attributed the tensions in Stahl's system to the rooting of his thinking in the various "reactive" political ones, "Currents of the Restoration," Schelling's philosophy and Luther's theology. In contrast, in 1967 Robert Adolf Kann firmly stated that Stahl merely systematized the conservative ideas of his time and adapted them to their needs. His ideas, which had already been outdated during his lifetime, essentially did not go beyond the medieval doctrine of the two swords. Martin Greiffenhagen characterized Stahl in 1977 as a representative of an authoritarian, authoritarian-institutional understanding of the state and church. His views - like the doctrines of his predecessors, party comrades and successors - are "refuted by their own history". In summary, H.-J. Wiegand stated in 1980: "Stahl is not dead; he left a legacy that haunts his heirs to this day."

Christian Wiegand examined Stahl's work very thoroughly and critically in 1980 and accused him of not having understood Immanuel Kant's critical epistemology and his transcendental philosophy, but rather having fallen behind from a pre-critical point of view and therefore not having been able to understand the German understand idealism.

Wiegand describes Stahl's work as one of the "most influential philosophical defense campaigns against the events of 1789" alongside Burke and Taine. He runs a general reckoning against the "system of the revolution". According to Stahl's own understanding, he means "revolution is the specific political doctrine which, since 1789, has fulfilled the way of thinking of the peoples as a world-moving power and determined the institutions of public life". And the "deduction from the will of man" is "always revolutionary".

The goal of fighting "the revolution" determines everything Stahl does: his writing, his academic and his political activities. That is why he agitates, debates and polemicizes mercilessly and uncompromisingly. Wiegand repeatedly states that "the only written word that is important for him [Stahl] is Rom. 13", with which he justifies the monarchical principle: "In particular, the government has respect and authority from God. It is by the grace of God."

As recently as 2010, Federal Minister of Justice Sabine Leutheusser-Schnarrenberger stated critically that, according to Stahl, all government and the power of kings (is) from God and all obedience to the law and to the supreme state power on this divine basis and authority should be based, "that the sham constitutionalism and sham parliamentarism above all of the empire was almost the prerequisite for the formation and consolidation of a historically blind, rigid, authoritarian state system of government in Germany with unlimited powers" and this organic, conservative and romantic understanding of the state describes "a state with its own full powers, whose scope for action is at best moral, but by no means are subject to a specified legal limitation. In plain language: This state is allowed to do everything if it wants to." She also states "that the essential elements of Carl Schmitt's state theory are entirely consistent with the state theory of the 19th century related to the monarchy or - to put it another way - entirely in line with the organic."

== Selected works ==
- Die Philosophie des Rechts nach geschichtlicher Ansicht (3 volumes). Heidelberg, 1830, 1833, 1837. Translated, expanded and revised by Ruben Alvarado (2 Volumes), 2020, 2021, 2022, 2024, 2025.
  - Volume I: The History of Legal Philosophy
    - Part A: The Rise and Fall of Natural Law
    - Part B: The Recovery of Historical Law
  - Volume II: The Doctrine of Law and State on the Basis of the Christian World-View.
    - Book I: Philosophical Foundation
    - Book II: Principles of Law
    - Book III: Private Law
    - Book IV: The Doctrine of State and the Principles of State Law
- Die Kirchenverfassung nach Lehre und Recht der Protestanten. Erlangen, 1840
- Ueber die Kirchenzucht. 1845 (2nd ed. 1858)
- Das monarchische Prinzip. Heidelberg, 1845
- The Christian State. Berlin, 1847 (2nd ed. 1858)
- Die Revolution und die konstitutionelle Monarchie. Berlin, 1848 (2nd ed. 1849)
- Was ist Revolution? Berlin, 1849, 1852
- Der Protestantismus als politisches Prinzip. Berlin, 1853 (3rd ed. 1854)
- Die katholischen Widerlegungen. Berlin, 1854
- Wider Bunsen. Berlin, 1856
- Die lutherische Kirche und die Union. Berlin, 1859 (2nd ed. 1860)
- Siebenzehn parlamentarische Reden und drei Vorträge (posthumous). Berlin, 1862
- Die gegenwärtigen Parteien in Staat und Kirche: neunundzwanzig akademische Vorlesungen (posthumous). Berlin, 1868
