= Otto von Gerlach =

German theologian (1801–1849)

Karl Friedrich Otto von Gerlach (12 April 1801 – 24 October 1849) was a German theologian and pastor from Berlin.

He was the youngest of five children of Carl Friedrich Leopold von Gerlach (1757–1813), first Lord Mayor of Berlin, and Agnes von Raumer (1795–1877), and brother of Ernst Ludwig von Gerlach (1795–1877) and Ludwig Friedrich Leopold von Gerlach (1790–1861).

Otto von Gerlach first studied law, then theology in Berlin, Heidelberg and Göttingen. He was influenced by the Great Awakening movement and was a member of the Christlich-deutsche Tischgesellschaft of Adolph von Thadden (1796–1882).

In 1835 he started as a minister of the Evangelical Church in Prussia at the St. Elisabeth Church in Berlin. In the worker district he laid the groundwork for modern social work, for example, an association of unemployed workers. He pushed successfully for the building of the Elisabeth Hospital, and king Frederick William IV of Prussia let him assist in the building of the model hospital Bethanien.

In 1847, the king appointed him 4th minister of the Supreme Parish and Collegiate Church. In 1848 he became Consistorial Counsellor at the old-Prussian Marcher Consistory at Berlin, in 1849 professor at the University of Berlin.

He married Pauline von Blankenburg (1804–1887) on 23 June 1835, with whom he had ten children, six of which died during his lifetime.

In 1844, he was found guilty of mistreating a maid, which led to her death, and sentenced to one year in prison, but he never had to serve his time.

Due to his work in the worker districts, he suffered from several diseases, including smallpox and encephalitis. He died at the age of 48, after suffering several strokes.

== Works ==
Otto von Gerlach published a major rewrite of the old and new testament after Martin Luther, and translated several important texts of the Great Awakening movement from English into German, including works by John Wesley (1703–1791), Richard Baxter (1615–1691), and Thomas Chalmers (1780–1847).
