= Hannah O'Brien Chaplin =

American biblical scholar

- Born: September 5, 1809; Danvers, Massachusetts, USA
- Died: February 18, 1865 (aged 55)
- Spouse: Thomas Jefferson Conant
- Writing career
- Pen name: H. C. Conant

Hannah O'Brien Chaplin Conant (née, Chaplin; pen name, H. C. Conant; September 5, 1809 – February 18, 1865) was an American biblical scholar.

== Biography ==
Hannah O'Brien Chaplin was born in Danvers, Massachusetts, September 5, 1809. She was the daughter of clergyman Jeremiah Chaplin and Marcia S. O'Brien. In 1830, she was married to Thomas Jefferson Conant, and in 1839 she became the editor of The Mother's Monthly Journal. She translated from the German Strauss' Baptism in Jordan, Neander's commentary on Philippians, and works by other authors. Her works are The Earnest Man, a biography of Adoniram Judson (1855), and a Popular History of English Bible Translation (1856). She was an able assistant in her husband's Hebrew studies.

== Selected works ==
- The earnest man : a sketch of the character and labors of Adoniram Judson, first missionary to Burmah (1855)
- Popular History of English Bible Translation (1856)
- The English Bible. History of the translation of the Holy Scriptures into the English tongue. With specimens of the old English versions (1856)
- The popular history of the translation of the Holy Scriptures into the English tongue. With specimens of the old English versions (1880)
