= Karl Ludwig von Haller =

Swiss jurist and political philosopher (1768–1854)

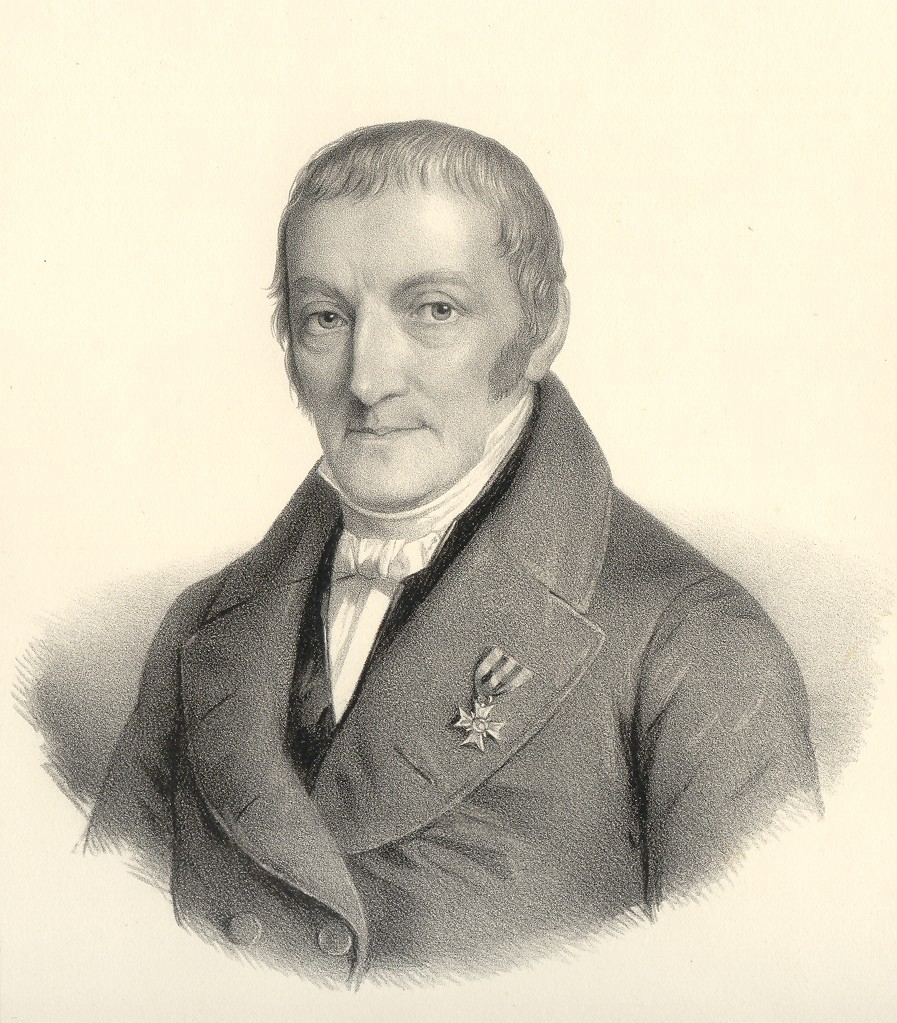
- Born: 1 August 1768; Bern, Bern, Old Swiss Confederacy
- Died: 20 May 1854 (aged 85); Solothurn, Solothurn, Switzerland

Philosophical work
- Era: 19th-century philosophy
- Region: Western philosophy
- School: Conservatism
- Notable ideas: Patrimonialism, private law theory of the state, critique of Roman law

Karl Ludwig von Haller (1 August 1768 – 20 May 1854) was a Swiss jurist, statesman and political philosopher. He was the author of Restauration der Staatswissenschaft (Restoration of Political Science, 1816–1834), a book which gave its namesake to the Restoration period after the Congress of Vienna, and which Georg Wilhelm Friedrich Hegel strongly criticized in §258 of Elements of the Philosophy of Right.

Von Haller's work, which was burnt during the Wartburg Festival, was a highly systematic defense both of the principles of dynastic legitimacy and monarchy founded on territorial lordship, as well as of pre-modern republics like those of the Swiss city-states, and considered one of the most consistent rejection of modern political ideas of the social contract, public law, and state sovereignty.

== Life ==
=== Early life ===
Von Haller was a son of Bern statesman and historian Gottlieb Emanuel von Haller, and grandson of poet and polymath Albrecht von Haller. His lineage descended from Johannes Haller (1487-1531), a Reformed preacher who died alongside Huldrych Zwingli in the Second War of Kappel.

He did not, however, receive an extensive education, but only some private lessons and a few classes at the Gymnasium. As a child Haller studied at a Greek school under Philipp Albert Stapfer, the latter going on to serve as an official in the Helvetic Republic. At the age of sixteen he entered the chancery of the Republic of Bern as a volunteer. The family moved to Nyon due to his father's promotion as a Landvogt (bailiff). He studied by himself and so filled out the gaps in his education. Following the death of his father in 1786, he became the de facto guardian of his estate. He is elected substitute chancellor the next year, and begins attending the lectures of Swiss theologian Johann Samuel Ith. At the age of nineteen, he was appointed to the important office of Kommissionsschreiber, or clerk of a public commission. In this capacity, he obtained an insight into methods of government, practical politics, and criminal procedure. As secretary of the Swiss diet held in Baden and Frauenfeld, he became familiar with the conditions of things in the Swiss Confederation.

In 1789 he began investing in a French annuity plan, which he resold two years later due to his ethical opposition to the French government's confiscation of church estates as biens nationaux. Around this time, he read the works of Emmanuel Joseph Sieyès, and found himself drawn to constitutional liberalism.

=== Travels ===
A journey to Paris in 1790 provided him further acquaintance with new revolutionary ideas, and he was present at the Fête de la Fédération. The same year, he was elected to Bern's Kornkammer, responsible for managing the city's granaries. In 1792, he became a member of the Bernese Economic Society, and publishes his first written work, a report arguing against the export ban on butter. As secretary of legation he served several important embassies, for instance, one to Geneva in 1792, about the Swiss troops stationed there; to Ulm in 1795, regarding the import of grain from southern Germany; to Lugano, Milan, and Paris in 1797, regarding the neutral attitude of Switzerland towards the warring powers. These journeys acquainted him with some of the leading personalities of the day, including Napoleon and Talleyrand.

When the Old Swiss Confederacy was threatened he was dispatched to Rastatt to allay the storm. It was too late, however, and by the time he returned in February 1798 the French army was already on Bernese territory. He tried to conciliate the authorities by penning a constitutional proposal, Projekt einer Constitution für die schweizerische Republik Bern, and attempted one last mediation with Gen. Guillaume Brune on March 1, 1798, but was unable to stay the dissolution of the Old Swiss Confederacy. Bern would fall definitively four days later at the Battle of Grauholz.

Von Haller soon renounced any liberal principles entirely, and became an uncompromising opponent of the Revolution. Thereupon he resigned the government office he had held under the revolutionary authorities and established a paper, the Helvetische Annalen, running for 64 issues from April to November 1798, in which he attacked the excesses and legislative schemes of the Helvetic Republic with such bitter sarcasm that the sheet was suppressed, and he himself had to flee to escape imprisonment. The specific article that led to his being proscribed was Beiträge zum einem revolutionären Gesetzbuch (Contributions to a revolutionary code of law), a political satire. Featuring lines such as “To slander or overturn any authority means patriotism, and to the patriots one should be loyal, but an ‘oligarch,’ or a citizen from a former capital, or an honest magistrate who has done his duty, is not a man, but a wild animal with which one can do what he wants,” the work did not impress the Helvetic authorities. Henceforth, von Haller was a reactionary and a divisive figure. The Swiss physiognomist Johann Kaspar Lavater was his most vocal defender in Switzerland during this time, and Haller would pay tribute to him in an essay after Lavater's death.

=== Vienna and conversion to Catholicism ===
After many wanderings, he came to Vienna, where he was court secretary of the council of war, from 1801 until 1806. Public opinion at home resulted in his being recalled by the Bernese Government in 1806, and appointed professor of constitutional law at the newly founded higher school of the academy. When the old aristocratic regime was reinstated in 1814, he became a member of the sovereign Grand Council, and soon after also of the privy council of the Bernese Republic, and he abandoned his professorship in 1817. But in 1821, when his return to Catholicism became known, he was dismissed. This change of religion caused great controversy, and the letter he wrote to his family from Paris, explaining his reasons for the step he had taken, went through about fifty editions in a short time, was translated a number of times, and called forth numerous rejoinders and apologies.

In this document he made known his long-felt inclination to join the Catholic Church and his growing conviction that he must bring his political opinions in harmony with his religious views. Though he had expressed philo-Catholic sympathies for years, the immediate impetus for his conversion was a correspondence he started with Pierre Tobie Yenni, the bishop of Lausanne, in 1819. Haller was soliciting advice on the fourth volume of the Restoration of Political Science dealing with ecclesiastical states, whereupon Yenni began correcting his views on sacramental theology and other doctrinal subjects. After his conversion to Catholicism, his family soon followed him; with them he left Bern permanently and took up residence in Paris in 1822, after his initial requests to Friedrich von Gentz for settling back in Vienna were unsuccessful. In 1824 the Foreign Office invited him to assume the instruction of candidates for the diplomatic service in constitutional and international law, filling a vacancy left by Chateaubriand. After the July Revolution of 1830, he went to Solothurn and, from that time until the day of his death, was a contributor to political journals, including the Neue Preussische Zeitung and the Historisch-Politische Blätter. In 1833 he was elected to the Grand Council of Solothurn and exercised an important influence in ecclesiastical affairs which constituted the burning question of the hour, and held this post until 1837. In 1844, he was awarded the Order of St. Sylvester by Pope Gregory XVI.

== Restauration ==
=== Earlier work ===
In connection with his other work, Haller had propounded and defended his political opinions as early as 1808 in his ‘’Handbuch der allgemeinen Staatenkunde, des darauf begründeten allgemeinen Rechts und der allgemeinen Staatsklugheit nach den Gesetzen der Natur’’. This, considered by some his most important work, impelled Johannes von Müller to offer Haller the chair of constitutional law at the University of Göttingen. In spite of the great honour involved in this offer, he declined it. The Handbuch itself was an extended version of his inaugural lecture Über die Nothwendigkeit einer andern obersten Begründung des allgemeinen Staatsrechtes, published on November 2, 1806 and delivered shortly after his return to Bern. Two other essays would follow in 1807: the Über den wahren Sinn des Naturgesetzes: dass der Mächtigere herrsche, dealing with his doctrine of natural superiority as the basis for political authority; and Über die Domainen und Regalien, covering the jura regalia, sovereign rights of kings deriving from their ownership of the royal domains. By that point, Haller’s political doctrine had been fully formed. Haller published three essays in Friedrich Schlegel’s "Concordia," (1820-1823), and his various writings in journals and periodicals were collected in two volumes and published as Mélanges de droit public et de haute politique (1839).

=== Magnum opus ===
Haller's magnum opus, however, was the Restauration der Staats-Wissenschaft oder Theorie des natürlich-geselligen Zustandes, der Chimäre des künstlich-bürgerlichen entgegengesetzt. It was published in Winterthur in six volumes from 1816 to 1834. In this he uncompromisingly rejected the revolutionary conception of the State, and developed a natural and juridical system of government, arguing at the same time that a commonwealth can endure and prosper without being founded on the omnipotence of the state and official bureaucracy. The first volume, which appeared in 1816, contains his history and his rejection of the older political theories, and also sets forth the general principles of his system of government. In the succeeding volumes he shows how these principles apply to different forms of government: in the second to monarchies; in the third (1818) to military powers; in the fourth (1820) and fifth (1834) to ecclesiastical states; and in the sixth (1825) to republics. It was written primarily to counteract Jean-Jacques Rousseau's The Social Contract. Moreover, Haller's "Digression on Slavery" in the third volume made a deep impact on the Scottish historian Thomas Carlyle and surfaced again in his polemical "Occasional Discourse on the Negro Question". The book in its entirety was translated into Italian, part of it into French, and an abridged version into Latin and Spanish. All his later writings are influenced by the ideas here set forth, and oppose vigorously the revolutionary tendencies of the times and the champions of liberalism in Church and State.

Haller's political views were heavily influenced by his long tenure as a Bernese public official, a city-state with dependent territorial possessions that did not officially call itself a "republic" until 1716, and which was governed by a patriciate of 236 families who were eligible for election in the grand council, known as 'regimentsfähigen Geschlechter der Stadt Bern.' Direct taxation, public debt, and military conscription were virtually absent in 18th century Bern.

Repudiating the abstract juridical conceptions of sovereignty and civil society, Haller based political authority instead on a combination of personal power and acquired rights deriving from possession of property. Unlike most theoreticians who posited the formation of a civil state which partially or completely negated the state of nature, Haller posited an uninterrupted state of nature. In the Handbuch of 1808, he defined the state as "nothing more than a natural sociable relationship between free and servant, which differs from other similar relationships only in the independence of its head." He used the term "sovereignty" interchangeably with "independence" and "perfect freedom," defining it as a perfection or elevation of already existing private social relationships among extended households, one that increased the means for these social bonds to exercise their already existing rights, but which did not inherently confer any new ones. In Haller's theory, the authority exercised by states over their subjects is fundamentally alike to that exercised by a father over his wife and children, each bond being based on the dependence of the weaker on the stronger.

Depending on whether the source of personal power was in a natural person or fictive person (corporation), the state would either be a monarchy or a republic. In turn, monarchies were subdivided into three principal ways of exercising personal power: from land ownership (patrimonial states), from authority over a retinue of troops (military states), or from doctrinal and teaching authority over disciples and followers (spiritual states, a.k.a. theocracies).

He was strongly critical of the influence of Roman law on European jurisprudence for what he saw as obscuring the social relationships that had emerged following the dissolution of the Roman Empire by falsely analogizing them to ones that properly pertain to republics only. In his own words, the Roman Empire and the code of law it bequeathed was in a "monstrous state of incomplete usurpation, which one could call neither monarchy nor republic, which seemed to derive from both, but no longer rested on any basis; a state of affairs in which the forms and locutions of the republic had been preserved, but where, in fact, there remained only an absolute despotism, founded solely on military power." (vol. I, ch. VII of the Restauration der Staatswissenschaft).

=== Commentary on Haller’s work ===
The Swiss historian Béla Kapossy contextualizes Haller's thought by placing it in his Swiss background, and cites his criticism of Roman law as anticipating the field of conceptual history. Kapossy quotes Haller on the substance of his critique:

Just as the citizens of Rome constituted a community [Gemeinde], a citizenry, a genuine societas civilis: all other forms of human association and relations, too, had to be called societas civilis or civil societies. Soon all forms of states, even principalities had to be called civitates or respublicas (republics, commonwealths), the aggregate of serviceable people was called populum liberum (a free people), individual subjects who amongst themselves did not form any corporation and who were not in any particular way legally bound to one another were now called cives (citizens), the estates, servicemen who were called into council, and vassals were called comitia (popular assemblies) where the majority should carry the vote; princely domains were called patrimonium populi (public or state domains), the treasure of an individual lord became an aerarium publicum, private services owed to powerful and mighty lords were called munera publica (public offices) etc.

The term "patrimonial state" would later make its way into the sociology of Max Weber. Haller also exerted a great influence on modern German jurisprudence and the debates over whether the constitutional form of the Holy Roman Empire could be said to constitute a modern state, as recounted by Austrian medievalist Otto Brunner in his work Land and Lordship (1939).

== Reception and influence ==
The publication of Haller's work garnered passionate reactions. Moderate conservatives like members of the German historical school reacted negatively, believing that Haller, instead of defeating the social contract as he claimed, had simply given it a new, cruder form.

On the other hand, Haller's work made use of diligently by Gerlach and the Prussian government under Frederick William IV.

== Works ==
- Handbuch der allgemeinen Staaten-Kunde. Steiner’schen Buchhandlung, Winterthur 1808.
- Politische Religion oder biblische Lehre über die Staaten. Steiner’schen Buchhandlung, Winterthur 1811.
- Was sind Unterthanen-Verhältnisse?, 1814.
- Restauration der Staats-Wissenschaft oder Theorie des natürlich-geselligen Zustands der Chimäre des künstlich-bürgerlichen entgegengesezt. 6 Volumes (in two editions), Winterthur 1817–1834.
- Ueber die Constitution der spanischen Cortes. 1820.
- Lettre de M. Charles-Louis de Haller, membre du conseil souverain de Berne, à sa famille, pour lui déclarer son retour à l'église catholique, apostolique et romaine [Letter from Mr Charles-Louis de Haller, member of the Sovereign Council of Bern, to his family, declaring his return to the Catholic, Apostolic and Roman Church.], Paris/Lyon 1821.
- Freymaurerey und ihr Einfluss auf die Schweiz. Hurter, Schaffhausen 1840.

== Sources ==
- Liedke, Herbert R. The German Romanticists and Carl Ludwig von Hallers Doctrines of European Restoration, in The Journal of English and Germanic Philology (1958)
