= Thomas Jefferson Conant =

American biblical scholar

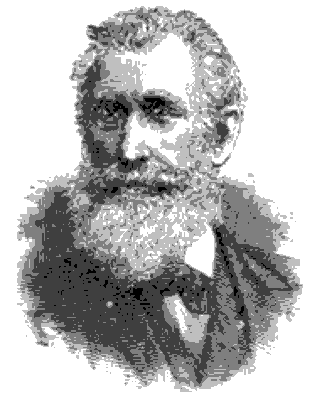
- Born: December 13, 1802; Brandon, Vermont
- Died: April 30, 1891 (aged 88); Brooklyn, New York
- Education: Middlebury College
- Occupation: Biblical scholar
- Spouse: Hannah O'Brien Chaplin (m. 1830; died 1865)

Thomas Jefferson Conant (December 13, 1802 – April 30, 1891) was an American Biblical scholar.

== Biography ==
Thomas Jefferson Conant was born in Brandon, Vermont on December 13, 1802. Graduating from Middlebury College in 1823, he became tutor in the Columbian University, Washington D.C. from 1825 to 1827, professor of Greek, Latin, and German at Waterville College (now Colby College) from 1827 to 1833, professor of Biblical Literature and criticism in Hamilton Theological Institute (New York) from 1835 to 1851, and professor of Hebrew and of Biblical exegesis in Rochester Theological Seminary from 1851 to 1857. From 1857 to 1875 he was employed by the American Bible Union on the revision of the New Testament (1871).

In the opinion of the author of his biography in the Encycloaedia Britannica, (11th ed.) Conant was the foremost Hebrew scholar of his time in America. He died in Brooklyn, New York, in 1891.

== Works ==
Conant's treatise, The Meaning and Use of Baptizing Philologically and Historically Investigated (1860), an appendix to the revised version of the Gospel by Matthew, is a valuable summary of the evidence for Baptist doctrine.

Conant translated and edited Gesenius's Hebrew Grammar (1839; 1877)—and criticized a competing translation by Moses Stuart. He published revised versions with notes of Job (1856), Genesis (1868), Psalms (1871), Proverbs (1872), Isaiah i.xiii. 22 (1874), and Historical Books of the Old Testament, Joshua to II. Kings (1884).

== Family ==
Conant married Hannah O'Brien Chaplin (1809–1865) in 1830, herself the author of The Earnest Man, a biography of Adoniram Judson (1855), and The History of the English Bible (1859); besides being her husband's assistant she was an able assistant in his Hebrew studies.
