= Ernst Ludwig von Gerlach =

Prussian politician (1795–1877)

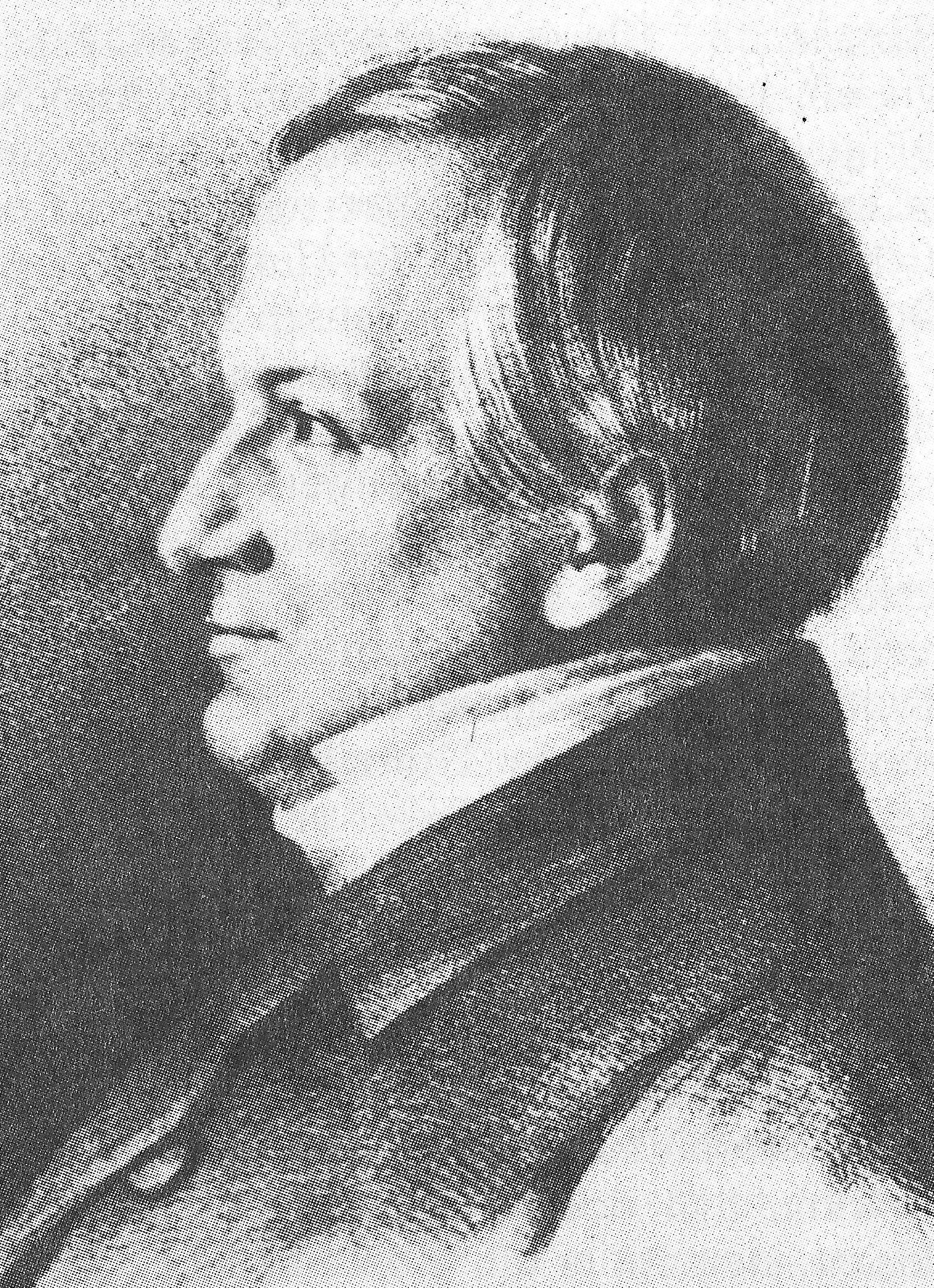
Ernst Ludwig von Gerlach

Ernst Ludwig von Gerlach (7 March 1795 – 18 February 1877) was a Prussian politician, editor and judge. He is considered one of the main founders and leading thinkers of the Conservative Party in Prussia and was for many years its leader in the Prussian House of Representatives. Like his brother Leopold von Gerlach, he belonged to the circle that formed around the Neue Preußische Zeitung (New Prussian Newspaper), better known as the Kreuzzeitung, which he helped establish.

== Life ==
=== Origins and youth ===
Gerlach was born in Berlin in 1795 to a family of Prussian bureaucratic gentry, the fourth child of the mayor of Berlin, Carl Friedrich Leopold von Gerlach. Among his brothers were Leopold von Gerlach, the later general and adjutant to the Prussian king, and the theologian and court chaplain Otto von Gerlach. Between 1810 and 1815 Ernst Ludwig studied law, with interruptions, at the newly founded University of Berlin, then later in Göttingen and Heidelberg. From 1813 to 1815 he fought in the War of the Sixth Coalition, during which he was wounded several times. He ended his service as an officer.

One of the most formative experiences in Gerlach's life was his friendship with Adolf von Thadden-Trieglaff, whom he met in Berlin in 1815. Encouraged in large part by the contact, he and his brother Leopold took active part in the Pomeranian religious revival movement of the 1820s. The religious imprint he received from Pietism in his youth accompanied him, his actions and thoughts throughout his life. His acquaintance with the young Otto von Bismarck also stems from the same time and circle.

=== Prussian civil service ===
Gerlach entered the Prussian judicial service in 1820 and became a Superior Regional Court Councilor (Oberlandesgerichtsrat) in Naumburg (Saale) in 1823. After 1835 he was a Regional and Municipal Court Director (Land- und Stadtgerichtsdirektor) in Halle and Vice President of the Superior Regional Court (Oberlandesgericht) in Frankfurt (Oder), succeeding his late brother Wilhelm.

Gerlach also took a deep interest in theological matters, opposing the rationalist trends of his time. In 1827 Gerlach, Ernst Wilhelm Hengstenberg, August Tholuck and others founded the Evangelische Kirchenzeitung, (Newspaper of the Evangelical Church) which became the leading organ of the early conservatives during the Vormärz period. In 1830 he authored an anonymous article for it in which he subjected the philologist Wilhelm Gesenius and the theologian Julius Wegscheider to verbal attacks because of their rationalism. Ultimately neither professor lost his position, although the conflict damaged Wegscheider’s reputation.

He was a member of the "Wilhelmstrasse Club", which had set itself the task of reconstructing a Christian-Germanic state, and was a contributor to the Berliner Politisches Wochenblatt (Berlin Political Weekly) which appeared from 1831 to 1841. In 1842 he became Privy High Councilor of Justice (Geheimer Oberjustizrat), and soon thereafter a member of the State Council and the Legislative Commission under Friedrich Carl von Savigny. In addition to providing expert opinions for the planned establishment of a Journalistic Court (Pressegericht), Gerlach worked as a consultant for a planned reform of Prussian marriage law. In 1844 he became Chief President of the Superior Regional Court (Oberlandesgericht) and Court of Appeals (Appellationsgericht) in Magdeburg, where, together with his brother Leopold, the consistory president Carl Friedrich Göschel and others, he fought the Friends of the Light, a rationalist Protestant group. He left the civil service in 1874.

=== Political career in politics and journalism ===
The events of the revolutionary year 1848 strengthened Gerlach's willingness to become active in politics. In March of that year he faced hostility from revolutionaries in Berlin and Magdeburg because of his judicial service in Magdeburg, something that by his own admission only strengthened him in his stances. In the summer of 1848 he advocated traditional conservative viewpoints in a well-received speech at the general assembly of the "Association for the Protection of the Interests of Landed Property and the Promotion of the Prosperity of All Classes", also called the Junker Parliament. He and his brother Leopold also played a significant role in the "camarilla" around King Frederick William IV. It was a group of influential politicians that tried to influence the King and government leadership towards their way of thinking. Along with Friedrich Julius Stahl and others from the same circle, he founded during the course of 1848 the Neue Preußische Zeitung(New Prussian Newspaper), which was later also called the Kreuzzeitung (Cross Newspaper) because of the iron cross on the title page. Hermann Wagener, a confidant of Gerlach, was given the editorship. Gerlach later wrote the monthly or quarterly "Rundschau" (Review) for the paper, following traditional conservative lines.

In 1849 he became a member of the First Chamber of the Prussian Parliament, later called the House of Lords. As chairman of the recently formed Conservative Party, he again fought a tenacious battle alongside Stahl against radical liberalism and democracy and for the restoration of the "divinely ordained", pre-revolutionary order of the Ancien Régime. As a member of the Parliament of the Erfurt Union, he advocated the same views. In his political thinking, revolution and absolutism were equally devastating deviations from the ideal of a well-ordered state, meaning a Christian state corresponding to the will of God's creation. The development of his political views was influenced early on by the writings of Karl Ludwig von Haller and later through his acquaintance and close collaboration with Friedrich Julius Stahl.

In 1852 Gerlach was elected to the House of Representatives of the Prussian Parliament for the Köslin constituency and in 1855 became the founder and chairman of the conservative parliamentary group named after him, the "Fraktion Gerlach". Under the regency of Wilhelm I (beginning in 1858, following the stroke that left his brother Frederick William IV mentally incapacitated), he lost his parliamentary mandate as a result of an unprecedented electoral defeat of the Conservatives and resigned from the leadership of the Conservative Party. He continued to assert his political views as the author of the "Rundschau" in the Kreuzzeitung.

=== Late years and break with Bismarck ===
On the basis of solidarity with its ruling princes, he fought against German unification, which came about in 1871. He opposed the 1866 Austro-Prussian War, as he did keeping Austria out of Germany and Prussia’s annexations in northern Germany, as for example in the pamphlet "The Annexations and the North German Confederation" (1866). A member of the Prussian Parliament beginning in 1873, he showed himself to be one of the fiercest opponents of the church laws of Bismarck's Kulturkampf (cultural struggle) and joined the Catholic Centre Party as a guest. He thus incurred the personal enmity of Otto von Bismarck, with whom he had been friends for decades and in whose political rise he and his brother Leopold had played no small part. Because of his essay Die Civilehe und der Reichskanzler (Civil Marriage and the Imperial Chancellor), charges were brought against him in 1874 at Bismarck's instigation for contempt of authority. Gerlach was subsequently fined and the distribution of the pamphlet banned, which served only to increase its sales. Gerlach then took voluntary leave as Court President (Gerichtspräsident) in Magdeburg, which Emperor Wilhelm I granted him.

In 1877 he was elected member of the Reichstag for the Guelph Party for the electoral district of Hanover 4 (Osnabrück), joining the centrist parliamentary group as a guest member. On 18 February 1877, however, four days before the new Reichstag was sworn in, Ernst Ludwig von Gerlach died at the age of 81 as a result of a traffic accident, which had occurred on the Schöneberger Bridge in Berlin on the evening of the 16th. He is buried at Cathedral Cemetery II in Berlin-Mitte.

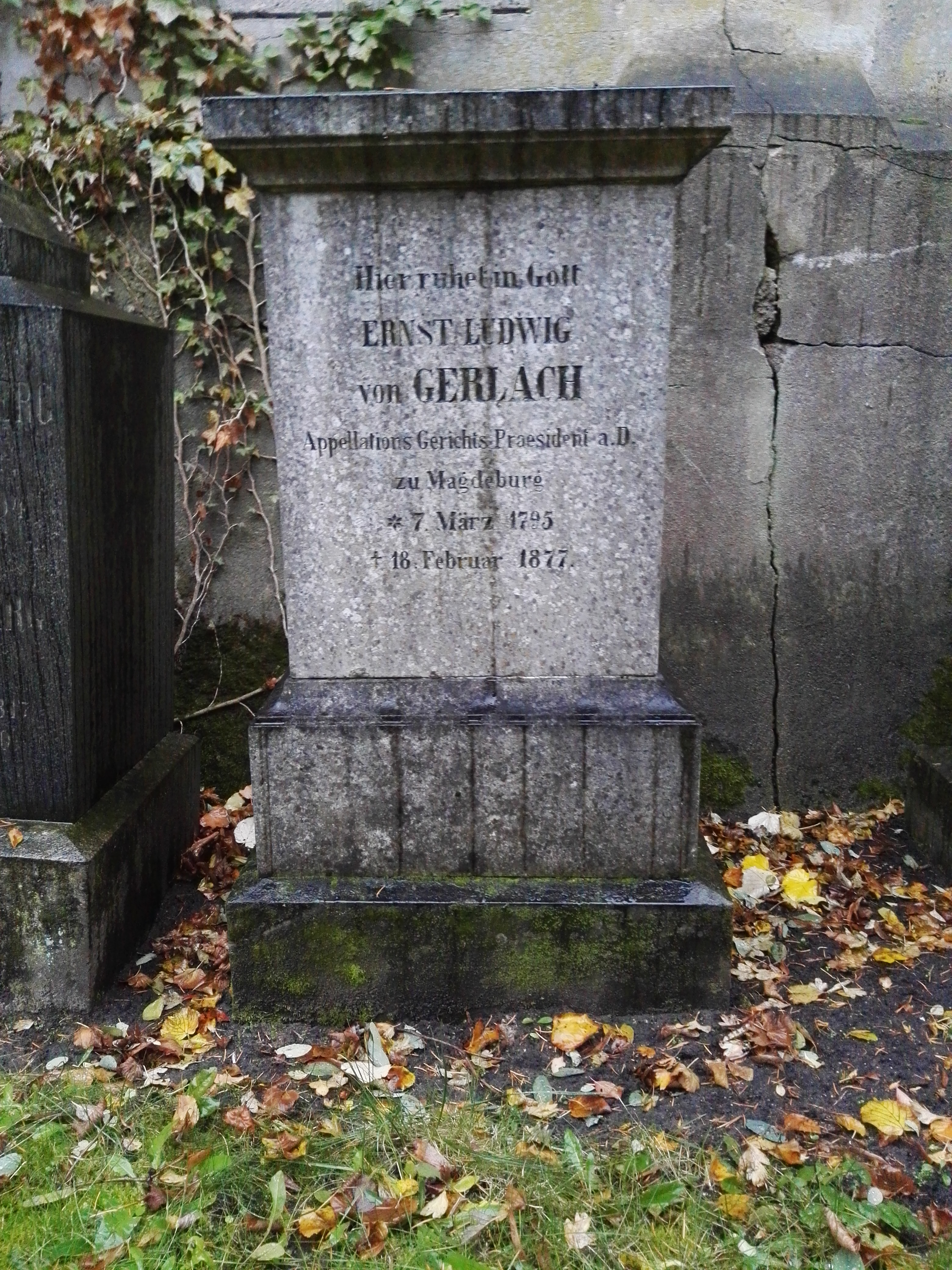
Gravestone of von Gerlach

Historical scholarship’s verdict on Gerlach is quite ambivalent. The historian Hans-Joachim Schoeps emphasized above all Gerlach's basic religious motivation:

All in all, Gerlach’s was a mind oriented less historically than systematically, but he was not a man of objective science [...]. In the end he must be seen as a systematic theocrat, probably the only one of his kind in modern history. He believed in the kingdom of God and regarded it as a political system; he looked at everyday bustle and held up to it God’s eternal demands – as political rallying cries. Only from this insight does the understanding of the man and his actions open up. Any merely political-historical criticism fails in comparison because he was concerned with metapolitics, with something that is more than history.

— Hans-Joachim Schoeps, "Gerlach, Ernst Ludwig" in Neue Deutsche Biographie 6 (1964), pp. 296-299.

== Gerlach Archive ==
The estate of Ernst Ludwig von Gerlach today forms the core of the Gerlach Archive, the family archive of the Gerlachs, which Hans-Joachim Schoeps was able to acquire for the University of Erlangen-Nuremberg in 1954. The focus of the holdings is the "Rohrbecker Archive", which contains Gerlach’s extensive correspondence (approximately 15,000 letters from almost 9,000 correspondents), as well as that of some relatives, various official and political documents, and his diaries (1815–1877). It is now housed at the University's Institute of Political Science and was newly indexed between 2012 and 2015. Since the completion of the cataloguing project in spring 2015, the archive's holdings have been fully catalogued in the Calliope Union Catalogue for Autographs and Bequests.

== Published works (selection) ==
- Ernst Ludwig von Gerlach: Aufzeichnungen aus seinem Leben und Wirken 1795–1877. Published by Jakob von Gerlach. 2 Volumes: 1795–1848, and 1848–1877. Bahn, Schwerin 1903.
- Ernst Ludwig von Gerlach: Gottesgnadentum und Freiheit. Ausgewählte politische Schriften aus den Jahren 1863 bis 1866. Published and with an afterword by Hans-Christof Kraus. Karolinger, Wien u. a. 2011, ISBN 978-3-85418-141-5.

== Bibliography ==
- "Герлах, Эдуард Людвиг" . Brockhaus and Efron Encyclopedic Dictionary (in Russian). 1906.
- Hellmut Diwald (ed.): Von der Revolution zum Norddeutschen Bund. Politik und Ideengut der preußischen Hochkonservativen 1848–1866, 2 Volumes. Vandenhoeck & Ruprecht, Göttingen 1970.
- Michael Dreyer: "Gerlach, Ernst Ludwig von," in Wolfgang Benz (ed.) Handbuch des Antisemitismus. Judenfeindschaft in Geschichte und Gegenwart, Vol. 2/1, De Gruyter Saur, Berlin/Boston, Mass. 2009, ISBN 978-3-598-24072-0, pp. 276 ff.
- Jürgen von Gerlach: Von Gerlach, Lebensbilder einer Familie in sechs Jahrhunderten. Degener, Insingen 2015, ISBN 978-3-7686-5209-4.
- Bernd Haunfelder: Biographisches Handbuch für das Preußische Abgeordnetenhaus 1849–1867 (= Handbücher zur Geschichte des Parlamentarismus und der politischen Parteien. Volume 5). Droste, Düsseldorf 1994, ISBN 3-7700-5181-5, p. 280, no. 482, "Gerlach, Ernst Ludwig von."
- Hans-Christof Kraus: Ernst Ludwig von Gerlach. politisches Denken und Handeln eines preussischen Altkonservativen (= Schriftenreihe der Historischen Kommission bei der Bayerischen Akademie der Wissenschaften. Vol. 53, 1–2). 2 Volumes. Vandenhoeck & Ruprecht, Göttingen 1994, ISBN 3-525-36046-0 (Zugleich: Göttingen, Universität, Dissertation, 1992). Volume 53.1 Volume 53.2.
- Hans-Joachim Schoeps (ed.): Aus den Jahren preußischer Not und Erneuerung. Tagebücher und Briefe der Gebrüder Gerlach und ihres Kreises 1805–1820. Haude & Spenersche Verlagsbuchhandlung, Berlin 1966.
- Hans-Joachim Schoeps. "Gerlach, Ernst Ludwig." in Neue Deutsche Biographie (NDB). Volume 6, Duncker & Humblot, Berlin 1964, ISBN 3-428-00187-7, pages 296–299.
- Karl Wippermann. "Gerlach, Ludwig von." in Allgemeine Deutsche Biographie (ADB). Volume 9, Duncker & Humblot, Leipzig 1879, pages 9–14.
