= Hermann Goedsche =

German writer

Sir John Retcliffe
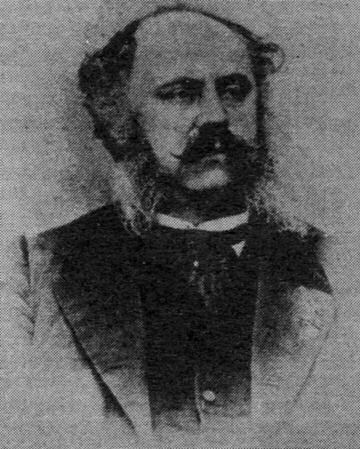
- Hermann Goedsche.
- Born: Hermann Ottomar Friedrich Goedsche; 12 February 1815; Trachenberg, Kingdom of Prussia
- Died: 8 November 1878 (aged 63); Hirschberg im Riesengebirge, German Empire
- Occupation: Writer
- Writing career
- Language: German

Hermann Ottomar Friedrich Goedsche (12 February 1815 – 8 November 1878), also known by his pseudonym Sir John Retcliffe, was a German government employee and author who is remembered mainly for his antisemitism.

== Life and work ==
Goedsche was born in Trachenberg, Silesia, then in the Kingdom of Prussia, now part of Poland. In 1848 he worked for the newspaper Neue Preußische (Kreuz-)Zeitung, together with famous Germans like Theodor Fontane, Otto von Bismarck and George Hesekiel. In 1853, he travelled as a journalist to Turkey.

Goedsche main genre of fiction was historical romance, as typified by Sir Walter Scott, Charles Sealsfield and Theodor Mügge, but he was also influenced by authors like Eugène Sue, Alexandre Dumas, père and George Hesekiel. Some of his works are critical of British colonialism. He was explicitly antisemitic and, although adopting an English pseudonym, he was a Prussian chauvinist who had a profound aversion against the British. His political opinions concerning "perfidious Albion" are expressed in his novels.

Goedsche worked as a postal employee, but was also an agent provocateur for the Prussian secret police. He forged letters which were used as evidence to frame democratic leaders. In 1849, he was caught after forging evidence for the prosecution of political reformer Benedict Waldeck and had to quit the postal service.

He died at Bad Warmbrunn, now Cieplice Śląskie-Zdrój in Jelenia Góra, in 1878. Several years after Goedsche's death, his novel Biarritz was plagiarized in the antisemitic forgery The Protocols of the Elders of Zion published at the turn of the twentieth century in the Russian Empire.

== Role in fabricating Jewish conspiracy theory ==
In his 1868 book Biarritz, Goedsche plagiarized a book by the French satirist Maurice Joly, The Dialogue in Hell Between Machiavelli and Montesquieu, and made an addition: the chapter "At the Jewish Cemetery in Prague" described a secret rabbinical cabal, Council of Representatives of The Twelve Tribes of Israel, which meets in the cemetery at midnight for one of their centennial meetings. They report on the progress of their long-term conspiracy to establish world domination. Among the methods to achieve this goal are the acquisition of landed property, the transformation of craftsmen into industrial workers, the infiltration into high public offices, the control of the press, and so on. The chairman Levit expresses at the end of the meeting the desire to be the kings of the world in 100 years. This fictional "Rabbi's Speech" was frequently quoted later as an authentic episode and invoked as a proof of the authenticity of the forgery The Protocols of the Elders of Zion for which, in fact, it is considered to have been a source. In Nazi Germany the chapter was re-printed independently in many editions.

To portray the meeting, Goedsche borrowed heavily from the scene in the novel Joseph Balsamo by Alexandre Dumas, père in which Alessandro Cagliostro and company plot the affair of the diamond necklace, and likewise borrowed Joly's Dialogues as the outcome of the meeting.

== References in other works ==
Goedsche appears as a character in the novel The Prague Cemetery by Umberto Eco. In the novel, the protagonist Simone Simonini approaches Goedsche in an unsuccessful effort to sell a forged antisemitic document to the Prussian secret police. Simonini later discovers to his dismay that Goedsche has appropriated the contents of the document for a scene of his novel Biarritz, causing other potential buyers of Simonini's forgery to think that he had merely plagiarized it from Goedsche.

== Works ==
- Der letzte Wäringer. Historisch politische Novelle aus den letzten Tagen Constantinopels (1835, as Theodor Armin)
- Vaterländische Romaneske aus den Zeiten Kaiser Friedrich Barbarossas (3 volumes, 1836, with Burg Frankenstein)
- Die Sage vom Ottilien-Stein (1836)
- Die steinernen Tänzer. Romantische Sage aus Schlesiens Vorzeit (2 volumes, 1837)
- Nächte. Romantische Skizzen aus dem Leben und der Zeit (2 volumes, 1838–1839)
- Schlesischer Sagen-, Historien- und Legendenschatz (1839–1840)
- Mysterien der Berliner Demokratie (1848, as Willibald Piersig)
- Enthüllungen (1849, anonymously)
- Die Russen nach Constantinopel! Ein Beitrag zur orientalischen Frage (1854)
- Sebastobol. Historisch-politischer Roman aus der Gegenwart (4 volumes, 1855–1857)
- Nena Sahib, oder: Die Empörung in Indien. Historisch-politischer Roman 1858-1859
- Villafranca, oder: Die Kabinette und die Revolutionen. Historisch-politischer Roman aus der Gegenwart (3 volumes, 1860–1862)
- Biarritz. Historisch-politischer Roman (3 volumes, 1868)
- Um die Weltherrschaft (sequel to Biarritz, 5 volumes, 1877–1879)

== See also ==
- Karl May
- Francisco de Quevedo – Spanish nobleman, writer and politician (1580–1645) who wrote a satiric tale La Isla de los Monopantos that is believed by some to have been a key influence and source of Biarritz and The Protocols of the Elders of Zion

== Sources ==
- Rathje, Jan (2021). "'Money Rules the World, but Who Rules the Money?' Antisemitism in post-Holocaust Conspiracy Ideologies". Confronting Antisemitism in Modern Media, the Legal and Political Worlds. Vol. 5. De Gruyter. pp. 45–68. doi:10.1515/9783110671964-005. ISBN 978-3-11-067196-4.
