= Waldow family =

Bavarian noble family

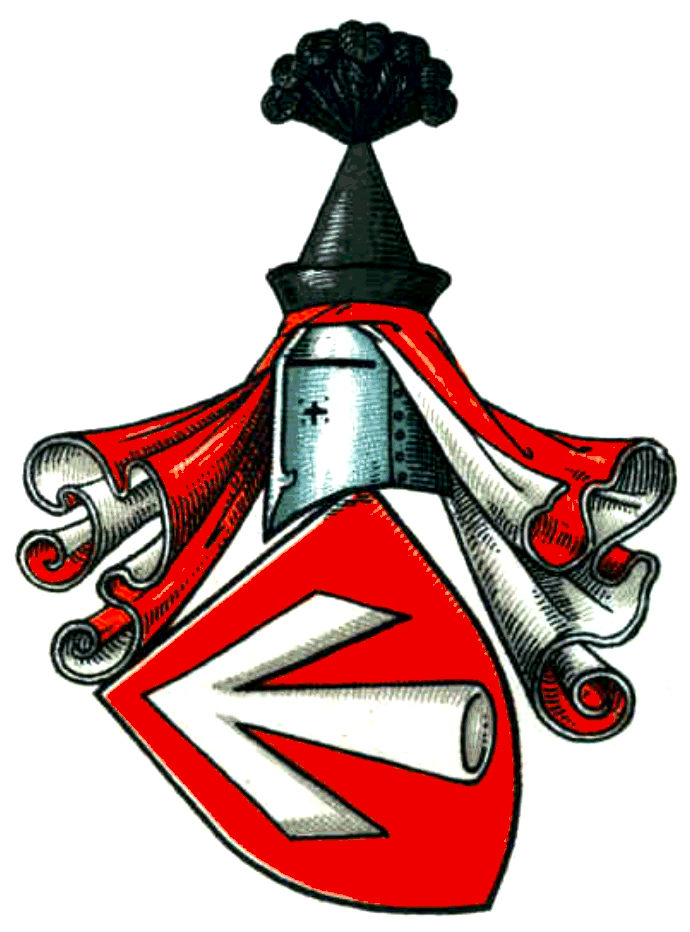
Waldow family coat of arms

The Waldow family or Waldau, is the name of a Bavarian noble family. The family belonged to the German nobility in Nordgau. Originally a Prussian family, they became influential in Brandenburg in the 14th century. The earliest known ancestor is Knight Hentzlinus de Waldow. The family acquired land in Neumark, Meissen, Silesia and Pomerania, where they came to prominence and prestige that they retained until the Second World War.

== Notables ==
- Adolf Friedrich August von Waldow (1854–1928)—Prussian lieutenant general
- Alexander von Waldow, (1923)—architect and former honorary chairman of the DS
- Hans Eberhard von Waldow, (1931-2014) - Dr. of Theology, Pittsburgh Theological Seminary,Pittsburgh Pennsylvania, USA
- Arnold Christoph von Waldow (1672–1743)—Prussian general
- Bernhard von Waldow (1856–1914)—politician, member of the Prussian House of Representatives
- Christian Sigismund von Waldow (1650–1707)—Major General
- Franz von Waldow—chamberlain to the Prussian court
- Eduard von Waldow and Reitsenstein (1796–1873)—Prussian landowner and politician
- Friedrich von Waldow (1854–1917)—Prussian major general
- Friedrich Siegmund von Waldow (1682–1743)—Prussian major general
- Friedrich Siegmund von Waldow
- Johann von Waldow—Bishop of Lebus 1420
- Johann von Waldow (died 1423)—Bishop of Brandenburg and Bishop of Lebus
- Johann von Waldow (died 1424)—Bishop of Lebus
- Karl von Waldow (1828–1896)—German Insurance Manager
- Karl von Waldow and Reitsenstein (1818–1888)—landowner and member of the Reichstag
- Karl von Waldow and Reitsenstein (1858–1945)—landowner and member of the Prussian House of Lords
- Sigismund Rudolf von Waldow (1673–1735)—Prussian major general
- Ulrich von Waldow (1881–1948)—German Lieutenant General in WWII
- Wilhelm August Hans von Waldow-Reitzenstein
- Wilhelm von Waldow (1856–1937)—Prussian politician.
- Wilhelm von Waldow—Secretary of State 6 August 1917.
- Johann V. von Waldow, also known as the Elder—Took part in the Council of Constance. From 1415 to 1420 he was bishop of Brandenburg and from 1421 until his death in 1423 the Bishop of Lebus.
- Johann VI. von Waldow (died 1424), called the Younger—First provost of Berlin and Council of Electors Frederick I. From 1423 to 1424 he was Bishop of Lebus. Both bishops were brothers and come from Königswalde in the Neumark. They were buried in the cathedral at Fürstenwalde.
- Adolph Friedrich von Waldow on Königswalde and Dannenwalde (1725–1801)—canon to Pomerania and 1797 Commendator Johanniter Coming Gorgast

=== Knights of St John ===
Commanders and Knights of St John:

- Bastian von Waldow (1608–1682) on Königswalde and Gleissen
- Adolph Friedrich von Waldow (1659–1717) on Königswalde, Gleissen, Dannenwalde
- Baltzer Friedrich von Waldow (born 1665) lieutenant colonel
- Adolph Friedrich von Waldow (1698–1754) on Königswalde, Gleissen and Dannenwalde was Commendatore referencing and privy.
- Ferdinand Heinrich Thomas von Waldow (1765–1830) Knights of St John, Major and country Marshal.

=== Prussian army ===
- Arnold Christoph von Waldow—hereditary lord on hammer and Költschen (born 1672)
- Friedrich Sigismund von Waldow (1682–1742)—Lord of the Manor on Mehrenthin and Wolgast and Major General.
- Sigismund Rudolf von Waldow (1673–1735)—Major General
- Karl Wilhelm von Waldow (1777–1836)—Knight of the Iron Cross Major General.

=== Politicians ===
- Eduard von Waldow and Reitsenstein—deputy in the Reichstag
- Karl von Waldow and Reitsenstein (1818–1888)—Chamberlain of the German Emperor and landowner
- Wilhelm von Waldow (1856–1937)—President of the Upper Province of Posen. In 1917 he was appointed Minister of State and Secretary of War Food Office.

An entry in the Royal Saxon Adelsbuch mentioned Max von Waldow, Prussian Lieutenant Colonel 1905.
