= Alexander von Ungern-Sternberg =

Baltic German novelist, poet and painter

Peter Alexander Freiherr von Ungern-Sternberg
- Born: 22 April 1806
- Died: 24 August 1869 (aged 63)
- Other name: Sylvan (pseudonym)
- Occupations: Novelist, poet, painter
- Spouse: Luise von Waldow (1850-1868)

Baron Peter Alexander Freiherr von Ungern-Sternberg (22 April 1806 – 24 August 1869), also known as Alexander von Sternberg, was a Baltic German novelist, poet and painter. He worked under the pseudonym Sylvan.

He was born on 22 April 1806 in Gut Noistfer (Purdi), Governorate of Estonia, Russian Empire, into the Ungern-Sternberg German-Hungarian-Swedish-Russian noble family and he was the author of historical and biographical novels, novellas and ironic tales.

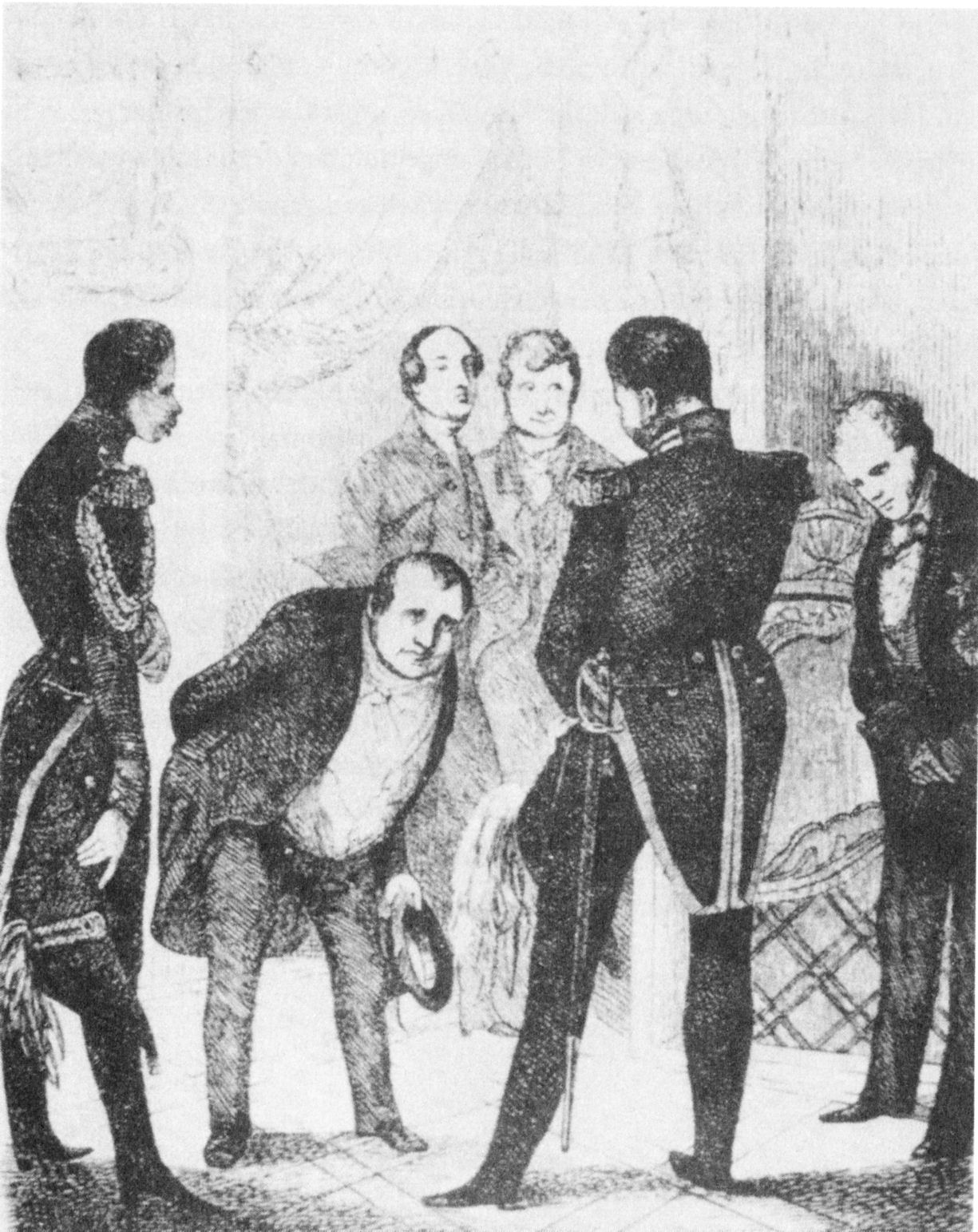
An illustration from his novella Tutu showing Tieck bowing to the King of Prussia.

He lived until 1854 in Berlin where he worked among other things as an author for the Kreuzzeitung. Occasionally, he was also active as a draftsman. Ungern-Sternberg studied law, philosophy and literature at the Imperial University of Dorpat until 1830.

Following this he had a brief stay in St. Petersburg and then Dresden, where he made the acquaintance of Ludwig Tieck. In 1841 he settled in Berlin where he associated with Karl Gutzkow, Willibald Alexis, Fanny Lewald, Tieck and other artists of the Berlin salons. In the revolutionary year of 1848 Ungern-Sternberg was on the side of the conservatives and was an employee of the royalist Kreuzzeitung. He later he went on behalf of the Russian Embassy in Berlin as rapporteur to the Frankfurt Parliament.

He married after 1850 in Dresden, to Karoline Luise von Waldow. The last years of his life he spent with his wife on his estate Gramzow in Mecklenburg Fürstenberger Werder owned by his brother the prussian chamberlain Franz von Waldow. He died at the age of 62; his wife preceding him by one year in August 1868 during a visit to his brother on his estate in Dannenwalde, Duchy of Mecklenburg-Strelitz.
