= Hermann Wagener =

German politician (1815–1889)

Friedrich Wilhelm Hermann Wagener
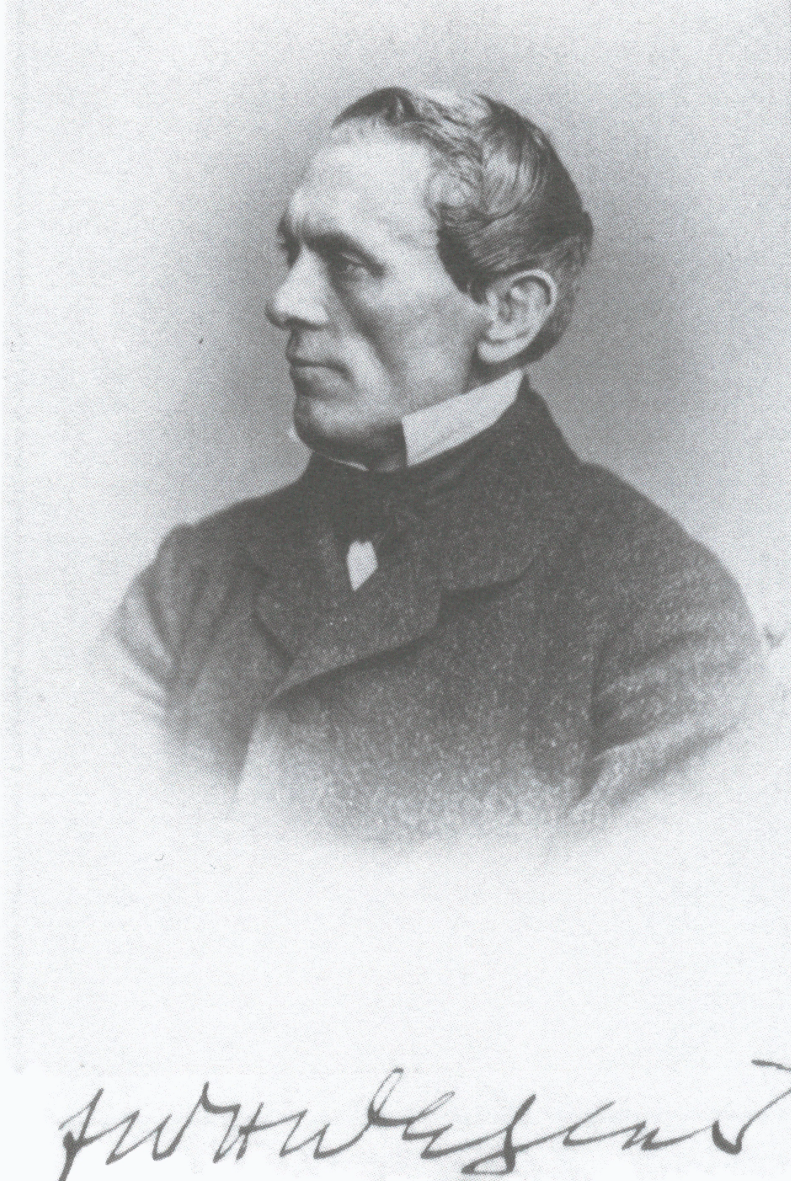
- Born: Friedrich Wilhelm Hermann Wagener; March 8, 1815; Segeletz (now Wusterhausen)
- Died: April 22, 1889 (aged 74); Friedenau (now part of Berlin)
- Occupations: Politician; Jurist; Journalist
- Years active: 1848–1889
- Employer: Kreuzzeitung
- Organizations: Prussian Conservative Party; German Conservative Party; Society for King and Fatherland; Prussian Volksverein; Social Conservative Association
- Known for: Chief editor of the Kreuzzeitung, adviser to Otto von Bismarck
- Notable work: Staats- und Gesellschaftslexikon (1859–1867); Die Politik Friedrich Wilhelm IV. (1883); Erlebtes (1884–1885)

Friedrich Wilhelm Hermann Wagener (March 8, 1815 in Segeletz (now Wusterhausen) – April 22, 1889 in Friedenau (now part of Berlin)) was a Prussian jurist, chief editor of the Kreuzzeitung (The "New Prussian Newspaper") and was a politician and minister from the Prussian Conservative Party.

== Life ==
Wagenar was the son of a country priest from Neuruppin. After studies and graduation in Salzwedel in 1835 he studied legal science in Berlin. He was interested in the judicial philosophy of Friedrich Julius Stahl and the economic theories of Karl Ludwig von Haller regarding political legitimacy.

He followed the usual legal career, becoming a law clerk in 1838 at the Higher Regional Court of Frankfurt (Oder) under vice president Ludwig von Gerlach and worked from 1844 to 1847 as an attorney at the Prussian land-improvement bureau and later at the consistory at the province of Saxony. In 1847 he became an appellate court attorney representing the consistory in Madeburg where he was assigned to prosecute liberal clergyman Leberecht Uhlich.

He left government service in 1848 and established himself as a lawyer at the High court, and at the request of Gerlach founded the organ of the Prussian conservative party, the New Prussian Newspaper to Save the Monarchy. He served as its chief editor until 1854. Theodor Fontane, who worked with him at the time, said in his memoirs Wagenar was a "sort of side-sun to Bismarck." Through his close-working with Otto von Bismarck, Wagenar became one of the best-known and controversial conservative pundits. In 1848 he founded the "Society for King and Fatherland."

In 1854 he retired from editing the newspaper (called the Kreuzzeitung because it featured a large iron cross) and invested his severance in a scheme in Neustettin (now Szczecinek) and worked as a criminal lawyer in Berlin. In 1856 he resigned his position as Justizrat and settled in Farther Pomerania to run for office. He became a clever and quick-witted speaker of the Prussian House of Representatives (Preußisches Abgeordnetenhaus) and provided great service to his party from 1867 in the North-German and from 1871 in the German Reichstag. His views often came with scientific justification, compiled in his 1859 "State and Society Dictionary."

In 1861 he participated in the founding of a Prussian Volksverein, a conservative society that was active until 1872. On March 29, 1866, he was appointed by Bismarck as an advisor to the department of State against the wishes of King Wilhlem I. Bismarck also consulted Wagener on social issues (Fontane reported he tried to instill upon Bismarck "fight against the hated bourgeoisie through social democracy," meaning he encouraged Bismarck's talks with Ferdinand Lassalle). In the first German parliament he supported Bismarck in his speeches about the German constitution and the Kulturkampf. His efforts to establish a social conservative party in 1872 failed.

In 1873 he became the first Council in the state department, but the Emperor refused to admit him personally. There had been bad rumors about Wagener's involvement in the Pommersche Centralbahn, a railway company. In a speech by Eduard Lasker on February 7, 1873, Lasker exposed the railways financial mismanagement, and it soon went bankrupt. Wagner was forced to resign in the scandal and was also fined in court 40,000 Taler for illegal profiteering. This cost Wagener his entire fortune. In 1878 he founded the interdenominational "Social Conservative Association."

Wagener published numerous writings, especially on social issues. His most important work was the 1862 Political and Social Lexicon. He wrote the 1876 platform of the German Conservative Party. He was also the spiritual father of labor insurance. Although a Catholic, he sought to curb the political influence of the Catholic Church. For this he advocated the creation of a "social pope" or "social emperor."

== Writings ==
- Das Judentum und der Staat. Berlin 1857. [attributed]
- Denkschrift über die wirtschaftlichen Associationen und sozialen Koalitionen. Neuschönefeld 1867.
- Staats- und Gesellschaftslexikon. Berlin 1859–1867, 23 Volumes; Supplement 1868
- Die Lösung der sozialen Frage vom Standpunkt der Wirklichkeit und Praxis. Von einem praktischen Staatsmanne. Bielefeld und Leipzig 1878.
- Die Politik Friedrich Wilhelm IV. Berlin 1883.
- Erlebtes. Meine Memoiren aus der Zeit von 1848-1866 und von 1873 bis jetzt. 1. Abteilung. Berlin 1884.
- Erlebtes. Meine Memoiren aus der Zeit von 1848-1866 und von 1873 bis jetzt. 2. Abteilung. Berlin 1885.
- Die kleine aber mächtige Partei. Nachtrag zu „Erlebtes“. Meine Memoiren aus der Zeit von 1848–1866 und von 1873 bis jetzt. Berlin 1885
- Die Mängel der christlich-sozialen Bewegung. Minden 1885.

== Bibliography ==
- Henning Albrecht. Antiliberalismus und Antisemitismus. Hermann Wagener und die preußischen Sozialkonservativen 1855–1873. Otto-von-Bismarck-Stiftung. Wissenschaftliche Reihe; Band 12. Paderborn: Schöningh, 2010, ISBN 978-3-506-76847-6 (Review).
- Siegfried Christoph. Hermann Wagener als Sozialpolitiker. Ein Beitrag zur Vorgeschichte der Ideen und Intentionen für die große deutsche Sozialgesetzgebung im 19. Jahrhundert. Dissertation. Erlangen, 1950.
- Wolfgang Saile. Hermann Wagener und sein Verhältnis zu Bismarck. Ein Beitrag zur Geschichte des konservativen Sozialismus. Tübingen, 1958.
- Klaus Hornung. "Preußischer Konservatismus und soziale Frage - Hermann Wagener (1815–1889)". In Hans-Christof Kraus (ed.). Konservative Politiker in Deutschland. Eine Auswahl biographischer Porträts aus zwei Jahrhunderten. Berlin, 1995.
- Hans-Christof Kraus. "Hermann Wagener (1815–1889)". In Bernd Heidenreich (Ed.). Politische Theorien des 19. Jahrhunderts: Konservatismus - Liberalismus - Sozialismus. Berlin, 2002. p. 537.
- Florian Tennstedt: "Politikfähige Anstöße zu Sozialreform und Sozialstaat: Der Irvingianer Hermann Wagener und der Lutheraner Theodor Lohmann als Ratgeber und Gegenspieler Bismarcks". In: Jochen-Christoph Kaiser and Wilfried Loth (Eds.). Soziale Reform im Kaiserreich. Protestantismus, Katholizismus und Sozialpolitik. Konfession und Gesellschaft, Band 11. Stuttgart/Berlin/Cologne, 1997.
- Herman von Petersdorff (1896). "Wagener, Hermann" . Allgemeine Deutsche Biographie (in German). Vol. 40. Leipzig: Duncker & Humblot. pp. 471–476.
- Sebastian Kranich (2001). "Wagener, Friedrich Wilhelm Hermann". In Bautz, Traugott (ed.). Biographisch-Bibliographisches Kirchenlexikon (BBKL) (in German). Vol. 18. Herzberg: Bautz. col. 1463–1468. ISBN 3-88309-086-7.
- Hans Joachim Schoeps. "Hermann Wagener ein konservativer Sozialist". In: Das andere Preußen. Berlin, 1981.
- Theodor Fontane. "Hermann Wagener (Erster Entwurf)". In: Wanderungen durch die Mark Brandenburg, Volume 3. Munich, 1994. p. 463.
