= Dieter Helm (politician) =

German farmer and politician (1941–2022)

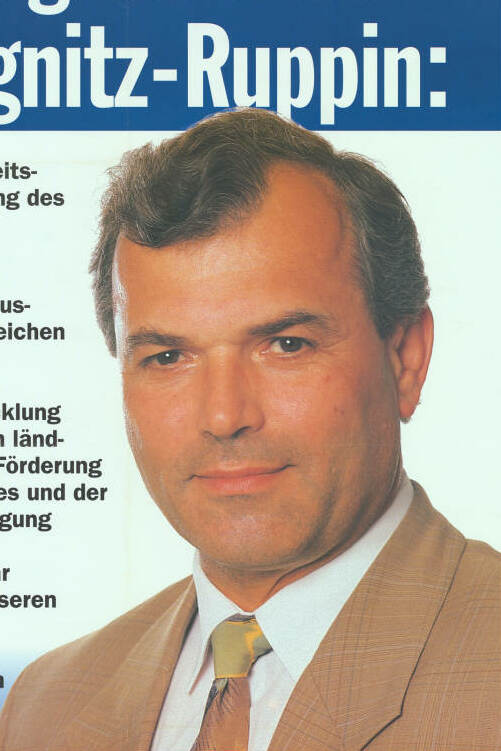
- Helm in 1994

Member of the Landtag of Brandenburg
- In office 14 October 1990 – 27 September 2009
- Constituency: Kyritz-Perleberg II (1990–?); Prignitz II/Ostprignitz-Ruppin II (?–2009)

Member of the Volkskammer for Bezirk Potsdam
- In office 18 March 1990 – 3 October 1990

Personal details
- Born: 13 July 1941 Keilbusch, Saxony, Germany
- Died: 19 July 2022 (aged 81)
- Party: Christian Democratic Union (since 1990)
- Other political affiliations: Christian Democratic Union (East Germany) (1990); Democratic Farmers' Party (1959–1990)
- Children: 2
- Education: Humboldt University of Berlin

Dieter Helm (13 July 1941 – 19 July 2022) was a German farmer and politician who served in the Landtag of Brandenburg from 1990 to 2009 and in the parliament of East Germany, the Volkskammer, in 1990. Helm represented the area around Potsdam first as a member of the Democratic Farmers' Party and later the Christian Democratic Union.

== Biography ==
=== Early life and career ===
Helm was born on 13 July 1941 in Keilbusch, Saxony. From 1955 to 1957, he received vocational training in agriculture, working as a farmer from 1957 until 1959. Between 1959 and 1962, Helm studied agriculture and horticulture at a technical school in Dresden, and he became a state-certified farmer. In 1963, Helm began attending the Humboldt University of Berlin, graduating in 1968 with a diploma in agriculture.

From 1962 until 1990, Helm worked as the manager of a Landwirtschaftliche Produktionsgenossenschaft, a type of collective farm in East Germany, also serving as the farm's deputy chairman and economist beginning in 1972. From 1991 until his death, Helm worked as a self-employed farmer in Wusterhausen in Brandenburg.

=== Political career ===
In the March 1990 East German general election, the first free and fair parliamentary election in the country's history, Helm was elected to the Volkskammer as a member of the Democratic Farmers' Party, representing the Potsdam District. In August 1990, Helm, who had been a member of the DFD since 1959, switched his party affiliation to the Christian Democratic Union (East Germany).

Following the reunification of Germany later in 1990, Helm ran in the 1990 Brandenburg state election as a member of the unified Christian Democratic Union, and was elected to represent Ostprignitz-Ruppin in the Landtag of Brandenburg. Helm was re-elected to the Landtag in 1994, 1999, and 2004. He did not run for re-election in the 2009 Brandenburg state election. During his tenure in the Landtag, Helm was a staunch advocate for agricultural and rural issues. He also served as the CDU's spokesman for agricultural issues. Additionally, Helm held several functionary roles within the CDU. From 1992 to 1994, Helm served as the CDU's parliamentary leader, and from 2002 until 2008, he was the chairman of the Seniors' Union of the State of Brandenburg.

Helm also held several elected positions in local office. From 1993 until 1998, he served on the municipal council of Bückwitz, at some point also serving as the town's mayor. From 1998 to 2010, he also served on the Ostprignitz-Ruppin District Council. At some point, Helm later served on the board of trustees of the Brandenburg Main and State Stud Farm in Neustadt.

Helm died on 19 July 2022 at the age of 81. High-ranking CDU officials, including Sebastian Steineke and Jan Redmann, paid tribute to Helm following his death, stating that he was a "fighting spirit that was also open to compromises".
