= Kreuzzeitung =

Prussian national daily newspaper (1848-1939)

Neue Preußische Zeitung
- Mit Gott für König und Vaterland! ("With God for King and Fatherland!")
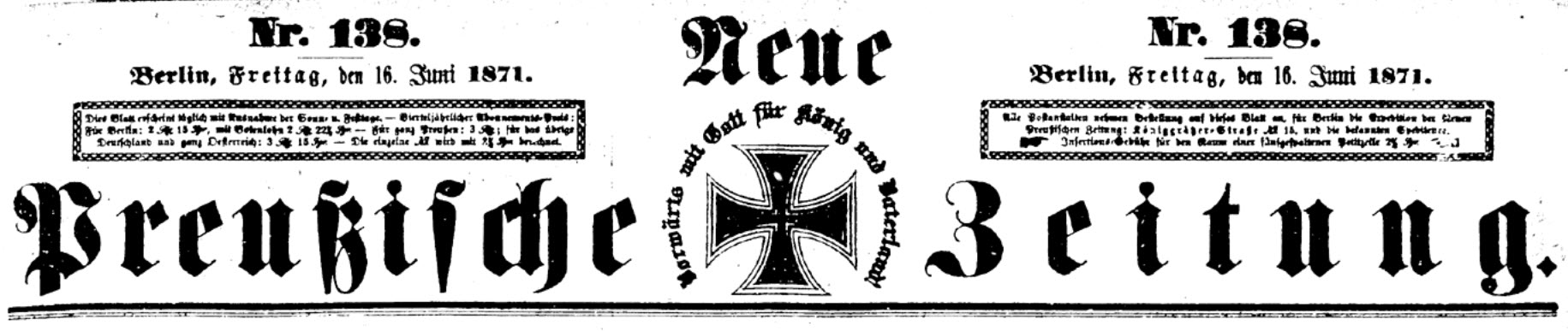
- Type: Daily newspaper
- Founder: Ernst Ludwig von Gerlach
- Founded: 30 June 1848
- Ceased publication: 31 January 1939
- Political alignment: Conservatism; Monarchism
- Language: German
- Headquarters: Berlin
- Circulation: 7.200

The Kreuzzeitung was a national daily newspaper published between 1848 and 1939 in the Kingdom of Prussia and then during the German Empire, the Weimar Republic and into the first part of Nazi Germany. The paper was a voice of the conservative upper class, although it was never associated with any political party and never had more than 10,000 subscribers. Its target readership was the nobility, military officers, high-ranking officials, industrialists and diplomats. Because its readers were among the elite, the Kreuzzeitung was often quoted and at times very influential. It had connections to officials in the highest levels of government and business and was especially known for its foreign reporting. Most of its content consisted of carefully researched foreign and domestic news reported without commentary.

Its original name was officially the Neue Preußische Zeitung (New Prussian Newspaper), although because of the Iron Cross as its emblem in the title, it was simply called the 'Kreuzzeitung' (Cross Newspaper) in both general and official usage. In 1911 it was renamed the Neue Preußische (Kreuz)-Zeitung and then after 1929 the Neue Preußische Kreuz-Zeitung. Between 1932 and 1939 the official title was simply the Kreuzzeitung. From its first issue to its last, the newspaper used the German motto from the Wars of Liberation "Forward with God for King and Fatherland" as its subtitle. It had editorial offices in various cities in Germany and abroad. Its headquarters was in Berlin.

The National Socialists took over the Kreuzzeitung on 29 August 1937, and the last issue was printed on 31 January 1939.

== Origin ==
In the Kingdom of Prussia, the Allgemeine Preußische Staatszeitung (General Prussian State Newspaper) was published from 1819 as a newspaper for official announcements. It later developed into the Deutsche Reichsanzeiger (German Imperial Gazette) and today's Bundesanzeiger (Federal Gazette). There was no other newspaper that represented the particular interests of the Prussian upper class. As a reaction to the March Revolution of 1848, the Bundestag repealed the Carlsbad Decrees on 2 April 1848. The middle class in particular, but also radical left-wing forces, took advantage of the newly won freedom of the press and founded numerous newspapers, among them the bourgeois-liberal National-Zeitung and the Neue Rheinische Zeitung (New Rhenish Newspaper) with radical-communist content.

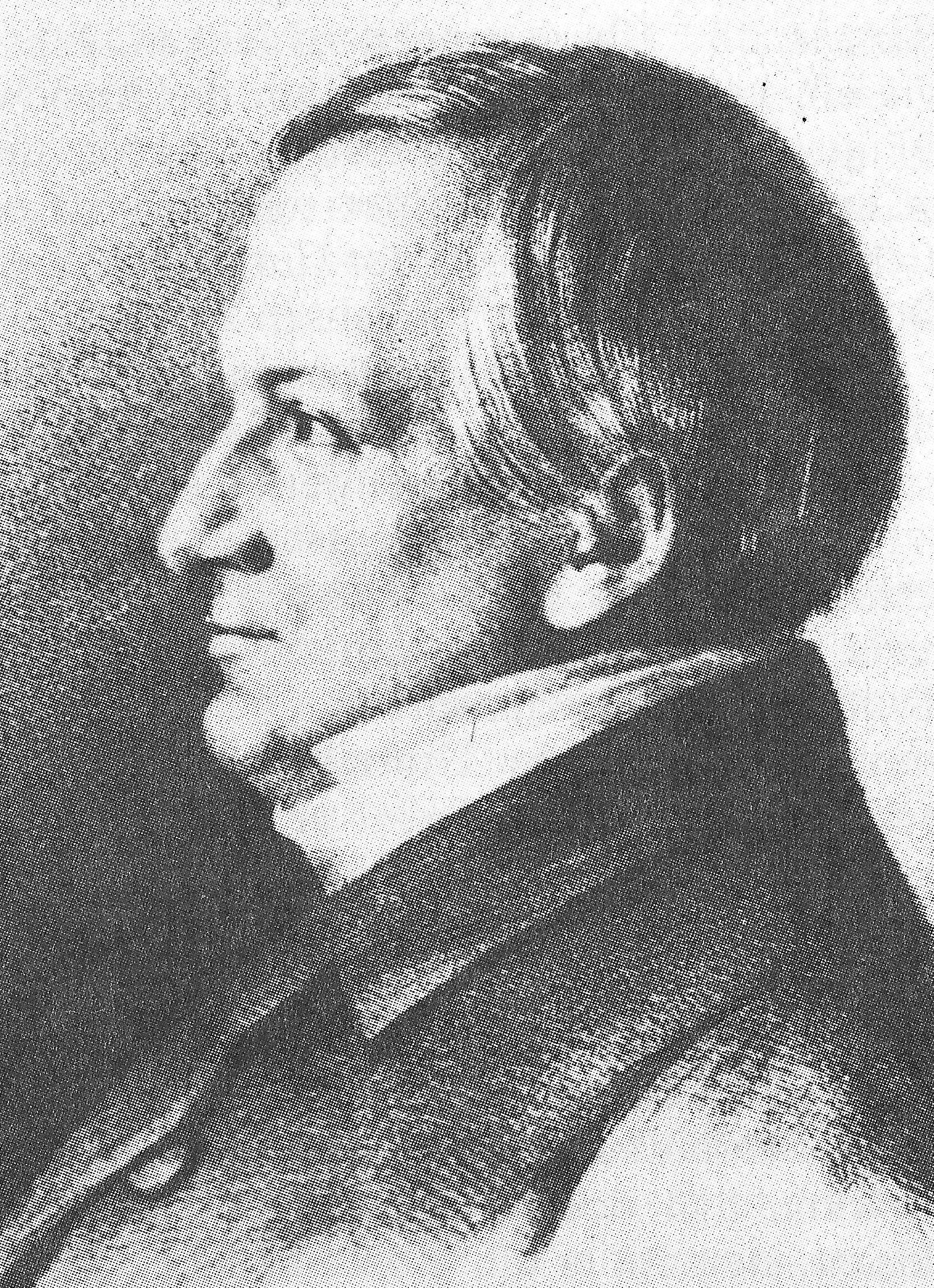
Ernst Ludwig von Gerlach (here around 1845) is considered to be the founding father of the Kreuzzeitung.

Monarchical-conservative circles sped up their push to found their own newspaper to represent the opposite side; this became the Kreuzzeitung. Originally it was to be called Das Eiserne Kreuz (The Iron Cross), but some of the founders found the name too militaristic. They agreed on the more noncommittal Neue Preußische Zeitung with an image of the iron cross in the logo. The newspaper was nevertheless called the Kreuzzeitung by its authors, creators and readers from the first issue. The main founders, almost all of them belonging to the camarilla around the Prussian king Frederick William IV were:

- Ernst Ludwig von Gerlach
- Leopold von Gerlach
- Hans Hugo von Kleist-Retzow
- Ernst Karl Wilhelm Adolf Freiherr Senfft von Pilsach
- Friedrich Julius Stahl
- Hermann Wagener
- Moritz August von Bethmann-Hollweg
- Otto von Bismarck
- Carl von Voß-Buch

The launch of the newspaper and the founding of the publishing house were carried out with military precision. The intent was for the paper to be characterized by good networking with the highest state institutions. Berlin was chosen both for the headquarters of the New Prussian Newspaper, Inc. and as the location for its printing. The calculated starting capital of 20,000 thalers was raised by selling shares of 100 thalers each. A total of 80 people subscribed, including Otto von Bismarck, who for many years personally wrote articles for the Kreuzzeitung. The largest shareholder, with shares worth 2,000 thalers, was Carl von Voß-Buch, a lawyer and civil adjutant to William IV. The subscription price was set at 1.5 thalers per quarter; outside Berlin, subscriptions cost 2 thalers due to the postal surcharge. The paper was printed initially by the Brandis Company in Berlin, and three sample issues were sent out in mid-June 1848. Following this, a large number of subscriptions was immediately able to be sold to aristocrats, district councils and senior civil servants. Hermann Wagener became editor-in-chief, and issue Number 1 of the Neue Preußische Zeitung appeared on 30 June 1848.

In connection to the new paper, the Prussian Conservative Party was called the "Kreuzzeitung Party" or simply the "Cross Party". In the same way, the use of the colloquial terms "black" or having "black views" to refer to members and voters of Christian conservative parties can be traced to the Kreuzzeitung, because the paper was printed in jet black until its end.

== Development to the founding of the German Empire ==
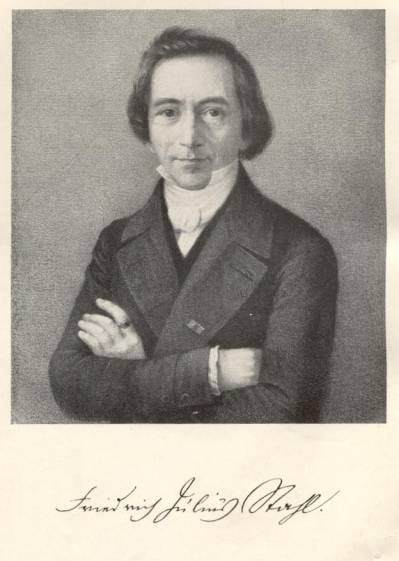
Friedrich Julius Stahl (here around 1840) had direct access to the king and wrote regularly for the Kreuzzeitung,

The Kreuzzeitung was controversial from the beginning, even among the various groups of conservatives. Particularly at the beginning of the post-1848 reactionary era, part of the upper nobility "categorically rejected such democratic means in the struggle to form opinions". Very quickly, however, Wagener was able to win the trust of the founders. With the support of Friedrich Julius Stahl, he quickly built up a dense network of authors and informants. The majority wrote their articles under a pseudonym as independent contributors. Only in Vienna, Dresden, Munich and other capitals of the individual German states were correspondents permanently employed. For many years Bismarck himself supplied reports from Paris. Reporters obtained news from all other countries through diplomats in Berlin.

The editorial staff enjoyed a relatively high degree of independence, although the paper's loyalty to the monarchy was never questioned. Until the end of 1849 the paper was not self-supporting. Frederick William IV is said to have personally supported the Kreuzzeitung financially at this time. Nevertheless, the editors were soon in a position to buy back most of the shares from the paper's backers. The chairmanship of the joint stock company was henceforth assumed by the current editor-in-chief. The shareholders were represented only on a five-member committee which had the right to audit the accounts but could not influence the newspaper's content or personnel.

That this independence had distinct limits was clearly felt by the first editor-in-chief. After the newspaper continuously and openly criticized both the dictatorship of Napoleon III and him as a person, Bismarck called on the paper to exercise restraint. The editors ignored the advice. As a consequence, in April 1852 the Kreuzzeitung was banned in France, and several editions were confiscated in Berlin. The next strains followed when the editorial board openly spoke out against the repeal of the Basic Rights of the German People as drafted by the Frankfurt Parliament and thus against the Lesser Germany solution. A wide variety of power interests and spheres of influence clashed here.

The paper's position repeatedly met with opposition from Otto Theodor von Manteuffel, then the minister president of Prussia. Another bitter rival of the paper was the head of the Police Department in the Ministry of the Interior, Karl Ludwig Friedrich von Hinckeldey. Hinckeldey did not hesitate to take the editor-in-chief of the Neue Preußische Zeitung into custody for several days when he refused to give the names of all writers, including anonymous authors, to police authorities. Hinckeldey received a personal reprimand from the king for his high-handed action. Although Wagener had received royal backing, he was unnerved and resigned from his position at the Kreuzzeitung. Tuiscon Beutner became the new editor-in-chief in 1854. Frederick William IV advised him "that the newspaper should continue to appear undeterred and should not change anything in its policy, only that it should be cautious toward France".

Under Beutner's leadership too the paper was not immune to impoundments. Entire editions that had already been printed were repeatedly confiscated. The reason for this was the differing views within the Conservative Party, which ultimately led to several splits from 1857 onward. In addition, the relationship between the Kreuzzeitung and Bismarck worsened. Even though he regularly had articles written for the Kreuzzeitung through his press assistant Moritz Busch until 1871, the Norddeutsche Allgemeine Zeitung was steadily evolving into "Bismarck's house postil".

Although the Kreuzzeitung predominantly represented the views of the arch-conservatives, i.e. the representatives of the king and later the emperor, it also always covered the interests of the liberal-conservative, Christian-conservative and social-conservative forces. In doing so, the paper presented facts or actions primarily as reports or news items, that is, without an assessment by the author. But the very fact that it published different positions without commenting on them brought it regularly under criticism. The German Question and the relations of the German states with the major European powers developed into perennial topics of dispute.

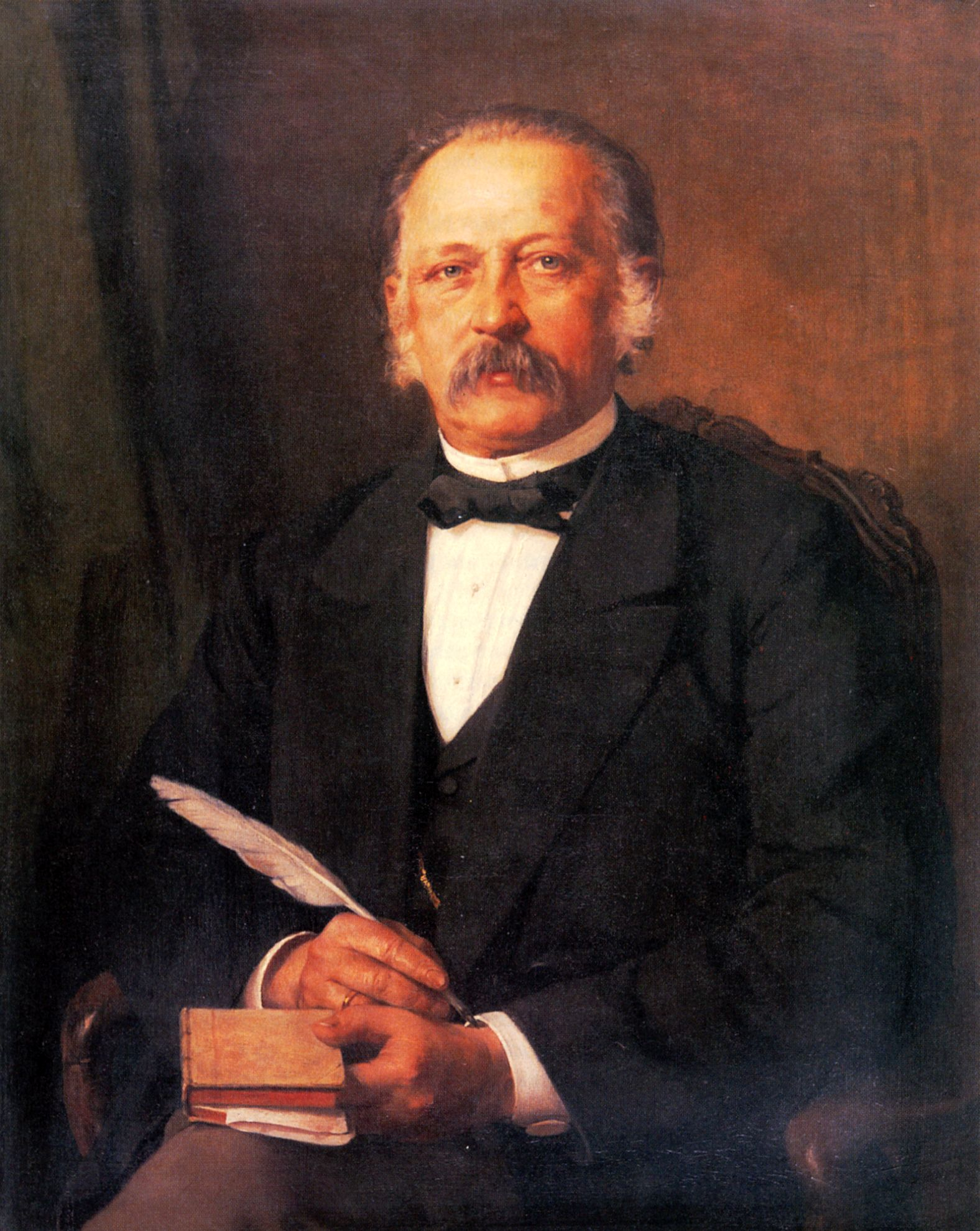
Theodor Fontane worked for the Kreuzzeitung for 19 years

The Kreuzzeitung received most of its information from younger diplomats. The first foreign correspondents it was able to attract were George Hesekiel in Paris and, from 1851, Theodor Fontane in London. Later the Kreuzzeitung had permanent staff in all European capitals. Until then, reports from foreign newspapers were sometimes passed off as the paper's own work. What today violates copyright law was a widespread practice at the time, and not only among German newspaper writers. Even the Times of London translated complete articles from the Kreuzzeitung, unhesitatingly citing their "own Berlin correspondent" as the source.

Fontane worked in London not just for the Neue Preußische Zeitung. He sometimes reported directly to the German ambassador Albrecht von Bernstorff and released press reports in support of Prussian foreign policy to English and German newspapers. At the same time he traveled to Copenhagen and wrote regular articles for the Kreuzzeitung about the German-Danish War. In his biography Fontane maintained that he "found no Byzantinism or cowardly hypocrisy whatsoever" at the Kreuzzeitung and that Friedrich Julius Stahl's motto applied in the editorial office: "Gentlemen, let us not forget that even the most conservative paper is still more paper than conservative." What was meant by this was that the presentation of various opinions, which should on principle be passed on without any judgment by the author, was part of a newspaper's sales success. In 1870 Fontane moved to the Vossische Zeitung as a theater critic.

The newspaper was printed by the Heinicke printing house in Berlin from 1852 to 1908. The publisher, Ferdinand Heinicke, also assumed responsibility for the content of the paper as the so-called 'sitting editor' who was the sole person liable in legal disputes and lawsuits. This protected the Kreuzzeitung's editors from such entanglements.

== Trends during the imperial period ==
In 1861 the circulation was 7,100 and increased to around 9,500 by 1874. Despite its relatively small circulation, it stood at the intersection of politics and journalism and was at the height of its power. Almost all newspapers in Germany and abroad regularly used introductory sentences such as "According to the Kreuzzeitung ...", "Well-informed Kreuzzeitung sources have learned ...", "As the Kreuzzeitung reports ...", etc. After 1868 Bismarck used the notorious Reptile Fund – money diverted for political purposes from elsewhere in the budget or to pay bribes – in order to influence the press and implement his policies. Evidence shows that the Neue Preußische Zeitung did not receive any funds from these "black coffers". The editors even dared to question such propaganda methods in two articles. As an economically self-supporting joint-stock company, the Kreuzzeitung was in principle independent of the crown and the government. Likewise, it was never a party newspaper or the mouthpiece of a particular party. Until its last issue in 1939, the paper had no party affiliation. Rather, the Kreuzzeitung represented the link between all conservative forces.

After the foundation of the German Empire in 1871, the reputation of the newspaper changed permanently. The reasons for this were the so-called "Era articles", the "Hammerstein affair", and above all the dissolution of the Prussian Conservative Party. This split into, among others, the Free Conservative Party, German Progress Party, National Liberal Party, German Center Party, Christian Social Party and German Conservative Party.

=== The Era articles ===
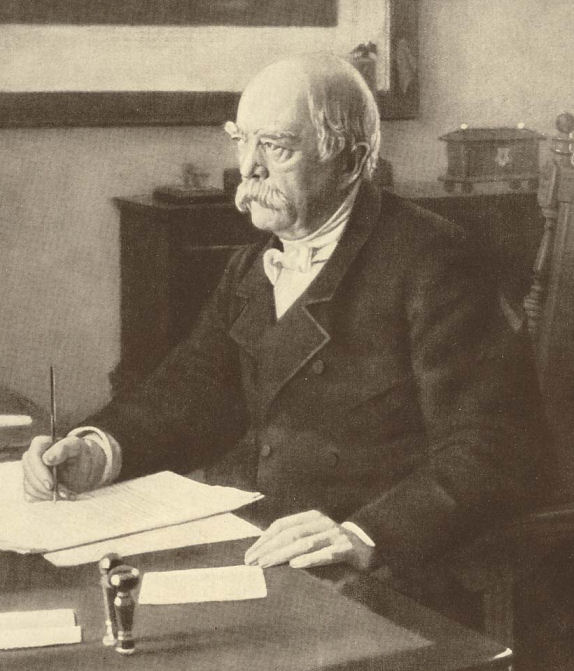
Otto von Bismarck (here in 1886) went from friend to foe of the Kreuzzeitung.

In the fall of 1872 Philipp von Nathusius-Ludom took over as editor-in-chief. He had no journalistic qualifications and strove passionately to make the paper populist - in today's parlance - and to stir up controversy. His efforts did not end well.

In June and July 1875 the journalist Franz Perrot, writing under a pseudonym, published a series of five articles in the Kreuzzeitung called "The Era of Bleichröder-Delbrück-Camphausen and the New German Economic Policy". In them he indirectly attacked Bismarck in the person of his banker Gerson von Bleichröder. The articles, which were heavily edited by Nathusius-Ludom, described Bismarck's economic policy as the cause of the stock market crash of 1873, accused the bankers of self-serving speculation and alleged all but openly that Bismarck was involved in corruption.

The articles triggered a scandal. Perrot revealed that bankers, mediatized princes, and members of parliament were able to gain advantages on the stock exchange not just through the help of diplomatic channels. It came to light as well that a number of state officials participated in wild speculations and made use of their official or political influence by personally participating in and founding joint-stock companies. Bismarck had to respond to the accusations in court and before the Reichstag. For him the conflict with the Kreuzzeitung was "now out in the open, and the bridges are burnt". Bismarck called publicly for a boycott of the Kreuzzeitung. The paper countered by publishing more than 100 names of declarants, nobles, members of parliament, and pastors who in letters to the newspaper expressed their approval of the publication of the research.

Nothing could be proven against the chancellor, but in fact he had hoped that his economic policy would lead to a split among the liberals. Moreover, his policies did indeed contribute to fluctuations in the stock market that had serious consequences. He bought up private railroads either himself or through intermediaries in order to establish a kind of state railroad system, thus putting considerable pressure on the railroad corporations and their steel suppliers. Perrot's accusations of corruption also later proved to be true. It emerged from documents that were uncovered that Bismarck had participated with his own funds in the founding of the Boden-Credit-Bank and had personally signed its foundation charter and articles of association, thus giving it a privileged position among German mortgage banks. The Iron Chancellor never forgave the Kreuzzeitung for the Era articles. Even in his late work Gedanken und Erinnerungen (Thoughts and Reminiscences), he spoke of "poison-mixing" and the "vulgar Kreuzzeitung".

It was never possible to find out who Perrot's source was. There was speculation as to whether Wilhelm I had wanted to give his Reich chancellor a personal warning. The emperor did not comment openly on the accusations of corruption, but he disliked the anti-Jewish polemic that was present in the five articles. Their goal was not primarily to defame the Jews but explicitly to "exasperate Bismarck". The proxy attacks on the Jewish bankers, however, went too far for Wilhelm I, who favored integration of the Jews. He had signed a pan-German law in 1871 granting equal rights to the Jews, and in particular in 1872 had elevated Gerson Bleichröder to the hereditary nobility, the first Jew to be accorded the honor. The consequence was that Franz Perrot and Philipp von Nathusius-Ludom had to leave the Kreuzzeitung.

=== The Hammerstein affair ===
Benno von Niebelschütz became the editor-in-chief in 1876. With him, according to the emperor, the newspaper "not only lost all journalistic bite, but in part even its readability". He was succeeded in 1884 by Wilhelm Joachim Baron von Hammerstein. Under his leadership, the paper treated the so-called Jewish question as a standalone topic. From today's perspective the Kreuzzeitung at times came close to being anti-Semitic. The term 'anti-Semitic' did not exist in Germany before 1879, and the controversy was fueled by various supporters and opponents from every conceivable point of view. Even among Jewish associations, conflicting directions emerged, some advocating a turn towards modern society and strong assimilation, and others seeking to preserve the traditions of the faith. With Theodor Herzl, who publicly and effectively sought the establishment of a Jewish state, the debate took on foreign policy dimensions. In the last two decades of the 19th century, the issue was so prominent that no newspaper could avoid it.

Hammerstein worked closely with the court chaplain Adolf Stoecker, with whom he maintained a personal friendship. Stoecker demanded, including in articles in the Kreuzzeitung, an unconditional assimilation of the Jews through baptism and a limitation of the 1871 constitutional act giving them equal status. He also accused several individuals of abusing Jewish emancipation to secure positions of economic and political power. Hammerstein and Stoecker completely ignored the warnings of the crown prince, who a short time later became Emperor Frederick III. He repeatedly described hostility toward Jews as the "disgrace of the century". The imperial house was determined to put an end to Stoecker's activities. In the spring of 1889, the Crown Council officially informed him that he was to cease his agitations. Since Stoecker continued to make trouble, he was forced to resign a year later by Wilhelm II, who became emperor after the death of his father.

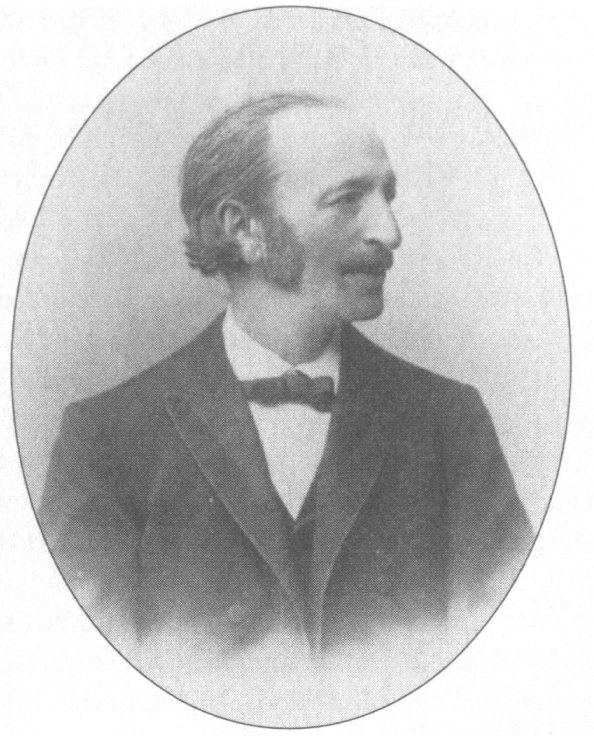
One of the best-known Jewish journalists of the time was Julius Rodenberg (shown here around 1875), who wrote for the Kreuzzeitung from 1859 to 1896.

Jews were in fact an integral part of the German Empire. The Kreuzzeitung had had Jewish writers working for it since its founding. By 1880 it employed 46 permanent correspondents who were Jewish and had several Jewish freelancers. Jewish deputies with large Jewish constituencies were represented in the conservative parties. The warning from the emperor had its effect. In 1890 the Kreuzzeitung did not take part in the media controversy over the Vering-Salomon duel, in which the Jewish Salomon was killed by his fellow student Vering from the Albert Ludwig University, but treated the ensuing disputes objectively. The paper pursued an internally developed "taming concept", which it outlined in the summer of 1892 with the words, "The Kreuzzeitung is here to keep anti-Semitism within limits".

The greatest damage to the respectability and credibility of the Kreuzzeitung was done by its editor-in-chief Hammerstein. He liked to portray himself as a "clean man" and always loudly promoted law and order but had relationships with women outside his marriage and lived in a grand style. On 4 July 1895 he was dismissed for dishonesty by the Kreuzzeitung committee. In his capacity as editor-in-chief he had approached a paper supplier named Flinsch and proposed a deal, asking for 200,000 marks (equivalent to about 1.3 million euros today) and in return committing himself to buy all the paper for the Kreuzzeitung from Flinsch for the next ten years. The deal went through. Hammerstein greatly inflated the invoices issued and pocketed the difference. In order to do this, he forged the signatures of the corporate board members Georg Graf von Kanitz and Hans Graf Finck von Finckenstein, as well as the seal and signature of a police superintendent. The affair was discovered. When it came to light that Hammerstein had exhausted a pension fund set up by the Kreuzzeitung, he resigned his seats in the national and state parliaments in the summer of 1895 and fled with the 200,000 marks to Greece via Tyrol and Naples.

The scandal created enormous waves and was debated repeatedly in the Reichstag. The Kreuzzeitung's competition – and it was considerable – ran the story on the front pages and reported almost daily on the state of the investigation. In the search for the criminal editor-in-chief, the Reich office of justice finally sent a detective inspector named Wolff to southern Europe. He scoured several countries and found Baron von Hammerstein, alias "Dr. Heckert," in Athens on 27 December 1895. Wolff arranged for his deportation through the German embassy and had him arrested upon his arrival in Brindisi, Italy. In April 1896 Hammerstein was sentenced to three years imprisonment.

In the wake of these events, the Neue Preußische Zeitung lost about 2,000 readers. Circulation fell steadily. Even Wilhelm II, who did not want to abandon the paper, could do nothing, although he had it publicly announced that "The Emperor reads the Kreuzzeitung now as before; it is in fact the only political newspaper he reads".

=== Neutrality during World War I ===
The decline was not halted until Georg Foertsch took over as editor-in-chief in 1913. He kept the circulation constant at 7,200 copies until 1932. The retired major had previously worked as a press attaché to the imperial navy. He maintained neutrality and concentrated on the Kreuzzeitung's core competence, foreign reporting. Foertsch encouraged young journalists but hired only professionals. They had the best connections to diplomats, politicians and industrialists both at home and abroad, with the result that the Kreuzzeitung was able to publish numerous reports exclusively and/or be the first to cover them. In domestic politics, Foertsch maintained personal contacts with the imperial treasury, from which he regularly received comprehensive information about the current financial and economic state of affairs, as well as the plans of the German Reich.

The new editor-in-chief reorganized finances and subsumed the buildings and editorial offices that the newspaper had acquired in recent decades in Germany and abroad under a wholly owned subsidiary, Kreuzzeitung Real Estate Inc. He also raised the subscriber price to 9 marks (today about 55 euros) per quarter. The readership apparently had no problem with this. Aristocratic landowners, politicians and high-ranking civil servants in particular subscribed to the paper for an additional 1.25 marks (today around 8 euros) per week, with twice-daily postal delivery. In the German protectorates as well as in Austria-Hungary and Luxembourg, the delivery charges by mail were also 1.25 marks per week. A single issue cost 10 pfennigs.

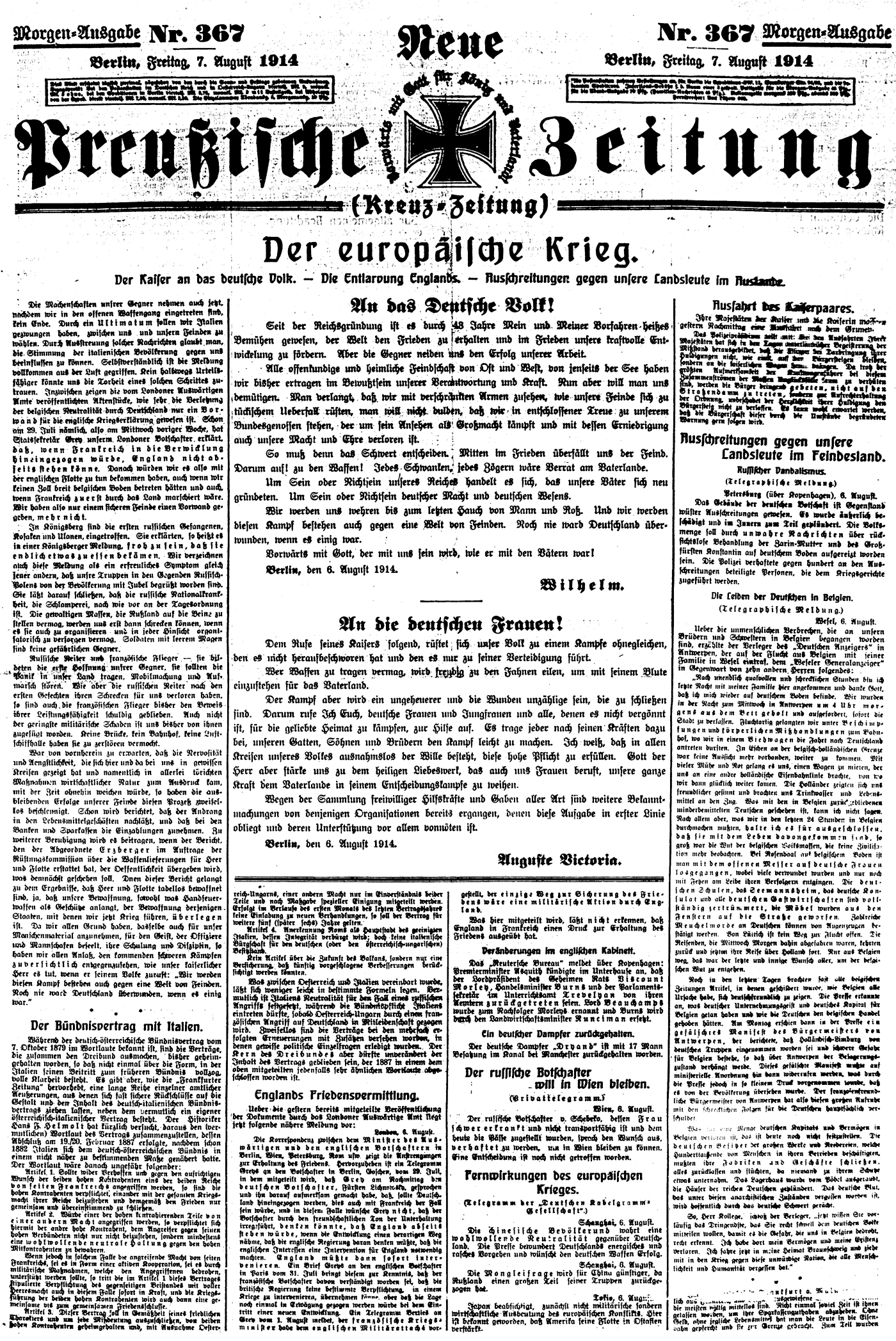
Speech by the Kaiser "To the German People!" on the front page of the morning edition of 7 August 1914.

One of Foertsch's best foreign experts was Theodor Schiemann. Through his books and political articles in the Kreuzzeitung he attracted the attention of Wilhelm II. This developed into a friendly relationship through which Schiemann was able to exert political influence as an advisor, especially on eastern European issues. On the eve of World War I, Schiemann foresaw a two-front war and wrote in the Kreuzzeitung on 27 May 1914: "The German Empire must consider the fact that it will find England on the side of its future adversaries, and should not carelessly bring about such a conflict." The article had no effect: on 7 August 1914, the Kreuzzeitung published Kaiser Wilhelm's famous speech "To the German People!" in which he said that "now the sword must decide".

During the First World War not only did all political parties enter into the so-called Burgfrieden – the tabling of domestic political and economic disputes – but in principle all German newspapers did as well. This went so far that several conservative parties effectively ceased their activities. During this period the Kreuzzeitung provided very well-researched commentaries which are still one of the most important sources for historians on military as well as day-to-day political events of World War I.

On 9 November 1918, the Kreuzzeitung ran the headline "The Emperor Abdicates!":

"We lack the words to express what moves us in this hour. Under the force of events, the thirty-year reign of our Emperor, who always wanted the best for his people, has come to an end. The heart of every monarchist is convulsed at this event."

Deep grief, apathy, escapism and hopelessness, as well as fears of what was to come that reached the point of panic reactions, characterized the prevailing mood of the old elites after the collapse of the empire. For the monarchist Kreuzzeitung, a world had irrevocably collapsed.

== Situation in the Weimar Republic ==
Writers have interpreted the attitude of the editors and thus the basic political direction of the Kreuzzeitung differently, especially during the Weimar Republic. Depending on the author's ideological view, the spectrum ranges from "stock Protestant", "feudal", "German national", "ultraconservative", "agrarian", "East Elbian" and "Junker conservative" to "anti-modern”. More recent research uses "monarchist-conservative" as the general term and regards other descriptions as one-sided at best and some of them even as false. On 12 November 1918, the Kreuzzeitung ran the headline: "Germany is facing an upheaval such as history has not yet seen" and, following Aristotle's constitutional theory, described democracy as a "degenerate" form of government, saying that "only a tyranny is worse". The goal of the paper remained the old one: defense of the monarchy. That meant that the Kreuzzeitung's stance was anti-Weimar Republic, but also anti-dictatorship.

Politically, most of the Kreuzzeitung's staff did not feel at home anywhere after the November Revolution. Few of its editors turned their backs on the paper; almost all were monarchists. They received some of the highest wages in the industry, and above all they were paid on time. The Kreuzzeitung had no party affiliation, so correspondents had a relatively wide latitude. As before, most of the newspaper consisted of scrupulously researched foreign news reported without commentary. Travel expenses were reimbursed, as were "cover invoices" for expenses such as undeclared payments or bribes. Through the Kreuzzeitung, employees gained access to the highest circles in Germany and abroad. Because of its connections to politics and business, the Kreuzzeitung continued to be regarded among journalists as a training ground. The weekly Weltbühne, for which the opposition Kreuzzeitung embodied the old German ruling class through and through, acknowledged the "old royalist Kreuzzeitung's useful foreign policy information" and gladly employed journalists such as Lothar Persius who had learned their trade at the Neue Preußische Zeitung. And even Vorwärts, the party paper of the Social Democrats, apparently had no qualms about a hiring a person like Hans Leuss, who had to leave the Kreuzzeitung because of his anti-Jewish agitation.

Jewish editors continued to work at the Kreuzzeitung. The paper consciously set itself apart from the "ruckus anti-Semitism" of the Hugenberg press. While the paper cannot be described as in principle pro-Jewish, neither was it anti-Semitic. The personalities of the editors shaped the paper's political leanings. Some authors almost as a matter of course used colloquial expressions of the time such as "traitor's reward" (Judaslohn), "Judas kiss" or "Judas politics". But non-Jewish politicians were also defamed as "Judas", since he was considered to be symbolic for a traitor.

The repositioning of some conservative parties left the editors stunned. The Centre Party, for example, had transformed itself from a Catholic-conservative party into a Christian-democratic people's party and until the end of the Weimar Republic was in a position to form coalitions with all political groupings. From that point on, the Kreuzzeitung primarily disparaged not communists or socialists, but politicians of the Centre Party. Their denomination played no fundamental role in this. The paper referred to the Catholic Centre politician Matthias Erzberger as a "corrupter of the country" and a "fulfillment politician" – in favor of fulfilling the obligations of the Versailles Treaty in order to show that it was impossible to do so – just as it did the Catholic Centre deputies Heinrich Brauns and Joseph Wirth, all of whom had explicitly identified with the wartime Burgfrieden policy of Reich Chancellor Theobald von Bethmann Hollweg.

On 17 November 1919 Georg Foertsch "massively attacked republican Reich ministers" in a Kreuzzeitung article. In it he proclaimed that the forces opposing "this corrupted revolutionary government are gaining ground daily" and concluded with the battle cry, "We or the others. That is our motto!" The new Reich government then filed a criminal complaint. Foertsch received a fine of 300 marks for defamation. In mitigation, the court took into account "that the Kreuzzeitung represented a point of view fundamentally opposed to the Reich government and that the author had worked himself into an irritated mood against the Reich government through his thoughts and writing".

=== Political direction ===
The paper in particular bolstered the conservative Bavarian People's Party (BVP), which split from the Centre Party after what are now known as Erzberger's reforms, which gave the German federal government supreme authority to tax and spend and sought a significant redistribution of the tax burden in favor of low to moderate income households. The BVP won more elections in Bavaria than any other party in all state elections until 1932. The BVP opposed republican centralism and initially called openly for secession from the German Reich. Journalistic support was provided by Erwein von Aretin, editor-in-chief of the Münchner Neuesten Nachrichten (Munich's Latest News) who also sat on the corporate board of the Kreuzzeitung. He belonged to the senior leadership of the monarchists in Bavaria and openly advocated separation of the Free State of Bavaria from the Reich along with proclamation of a monarchy.

The Kreuzzeitung in the same way supported the monarchist wing of the German National People's Party (DNVP), which was led by Kuno von Westarp. For a time it was seen as the party best suited for implementing the Kreuzzeitung's own beliefs. Those included rejecting the Republic as constituted, the Treaty of Versailles, and the reparation demands of the victorious powers. A fundamentally Christian attitude admittedly always played a decisive role. Alfred Hugenberg's policy of rapprochement with the Nazi Party met with criticism from the editor-in-chief as well as the corporate board of the Kreuzzeitung. Specifically, they rejected in principle the exaggerated portrayal of Germanness by the German Nationalists as well as by National Socialism itself. The Kreuzzeitung openly rebuked the "Ur-Germanic fantasies" and the "neo-Communist terrorist actions of the National Socialist Party". It not only accused the Nazi Party of "betraying the idea of the nation"; it repeatedly described the way "millions of Germans are falling for the brown pied-pipery". Finally, in a major article on 5 December 1929, the editor-in-chief emphasized that the Kreuzzeitung was not the "megaphone of the DNVP" and "not in any way a German nationalist party organ".

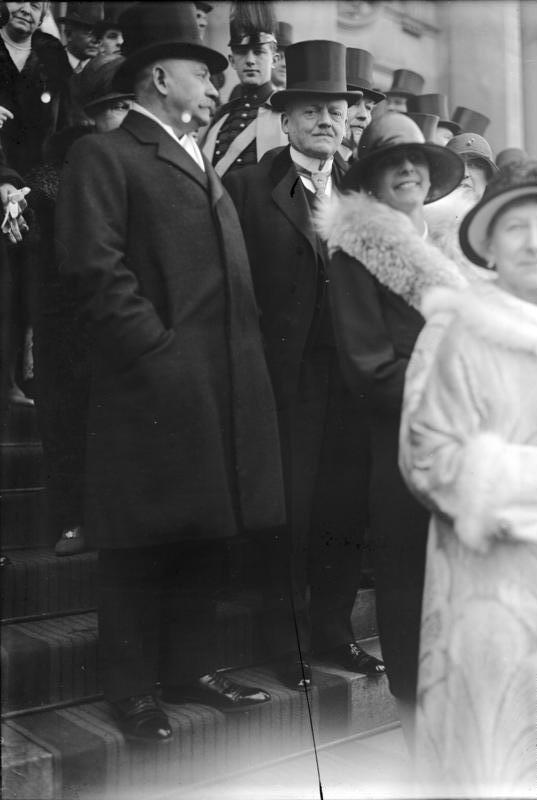
Count von Westarp (pictured here in the center in July 1928) was a member of the board of the Kreuzzeitung from 1919 to 1932.

The Kreuzzeitung also supported the paramilitary Stahlhelm, but only conditionally in the person of Theodor Duesterberg, whom the National Socialists had discredited because of his "not purely Aryan origin". During Duesterberg's candidacy in the 1932 German presidential election, a steel helmet (Stahlhelm) was depicted above the Iron Cross in the newspaper's header, but this was only a means to an electoral end. Editor-in-chief Foertsch repeatedly exposed the Nazi Party's campaign methods, contended that "Hitler was not free of socialist thinking and was therefore a danger to Germany" and ran headlines such as "May the day come when the black-white-red flag flies again on government buildings" – referring to the flag of the German Empire used from 1871 to 1918.

The Stahlhelm had over 500,000 members and the DNVP almost one million. Both groups had their own party newspapers. Their members were never part of the target group of the Kreuzzeitung, whose circulation remained constant at 7,200 until 1932. At no time did the paper come under the ownership of the Stahlhelm or the DNVP. Franz Seldte, the national leader of the Stahlhelm, owned Frundsberg Publishers in Berlin, through which he distributed several publications for the Stahlhelm. Alfred Hugenberg owned more than 1,600 German newspapers, so that he too did not at any time need the Kreuzzeitung as a megaphone or party newspaper, although he would gladly have taken it over for reasons of prestige. The Kreuzzeitung's target group always remained the conservative upper class. This included the members of the German Gentlemen's Club. All of the Kreuzzeitung's corporate board belonged to it, as did Georg Foertsch as editor-in-chief. Many of the Gentlemen's Club's approximately 5,000 members were readers of the Kreuzzeitung. They also provided the paper with information and gave it financial aid during the period of hyperinflation.

Reich President Paul von Hindenburg, who was seen as the guarantor of the monarchy and the sole figure with the stature to restore it, received unlimited support from the Kreuzzeitung. Hindenburg also occasionally leaked internal information to the paper and wrote short articles for it himself, which he had published via Kuno von Westarp. He had a legendary interview with the liberal Berliner Tageblatt which came about at the request of Hindenburg's press department. Hindenburg reluctantly agreed to the interview, took up, according to his own statements, "for the first time in his life one of those deadly world papers" and said in a defiant tone to his press chief: "But I will continue to read only the Kreuzzeitung." Accordingly, the interview with Theodor Wolff proceeded haltingly. Right at the beginning, when asked if he was familiar with the Berliner Tageblatt, Hindenburg replied, "I have been used to reading the Kreuzzeitung with breakfast all my life". The rest of the conversation did not proceed any better, as Hindenburg did not risk talking to Wolff, the most influential representative of the Mosse press, about either hunting or the military.

For the Kreuzzeitung, Hindenburg remained to the last the bearer of hope. He showed little inclination to confer the chancellorship on Hitler until shortly before 30 January 1933. As late as 12 August 1932, he rejected to good public effect Hitler's demand that "the leadership of the Reich government and all state power be conferred in full on me". The Kreuzzeitung praised Hindenburg's attitude toward Hitler as "understandable and well-founded". Granting Hitler's demands, the paper said, would have meant degrading the Reich president to a "puppet to be staged at ceremonial events dressed in a state robe". With this assessment, the Kreuzzeitung foreshadowed precisely the scenario that was to come about after Hitler seized power.

=== Economic collapse ===
During the hyperinflation of 1922/23, the Kreuzzeitung fell into existential difficulties financially. Its reserves continuously fell and it lost all of its real estate. Foertsch managed to keep the business going by means of private donations from members of the Gentlemen's Club. In order to prevent a takeover by the Hugenberg Group, he agreed in September 1926 to form an association with Helmut Rauschenbusch, who was also a member of the Gentlemen's Club and publisher of the Deutsche Tageszeitung (German Daily Newspaper). They founded the Berlin Central Printers Ltd. which printed the Kreuzzeitung and the Deutsche Tageszeitung beginning in January 1927. Although some employees such as the journalist Joachim Nehring supplied articles for both papers, the editorial offices of the Kreuzzeitung and the Deutsche Tageszeitung remained independent.

The issue of 1 March 1929 brought a significant change to the paper. The Neue Preußische (Kreuz-) Zeitung officially became the Neue Preußische Kreuzzeitung. The editors expressed the change to their readers as follows:

"As of today our paper appears in a different garb. For the alteration to our masthead the following consideration was decisive: Our newspaper, founded in 1848 under the name 'Neue Preußische Zeitung', very soon came generally to be called in public simply the Kreuzzeitung after its emblem, the Iron Cross. Even today, our paper is known at home and abroad almost exclusively by this name. Likewise, in political respects the word Kreuzzeitung has for decades been an established term based on the Iron Cross with its inscription 'With God for King and Fatherland'. Indeed, for Christian-conservative thought and action, this cross with its accompanying words is a firm symbol for which we fight, now as in the past. We thus remain true to our great tradition with its roots in Prussia and Prussian royalty."

But not only the name was changed. For reasons of economy the paper was published only once instead of twice a day, although at the same time it appeared on Mondays as well. This did not result in an increase in circulation. At this time some 4,700 different daily and weekly newspapers were published throughout the Reich. Never before or since have there been more newspapers in Germany. Smaller and ‘independent’ publishers were subject to enormous competitive pressure. Mergers took place almost weekly. With the onset of the Great Depression, the Kreuzzeitung faced bankruptcy and was incorporated as a wholly owned subsidiary of Deutsche Tageszeitung Printers und Publishers, Inc. As a representative of the Kreuzzeitung, Kuno von Westarp joined the corporate board. At the same time the company took over the Deutsche Schriftenverlag, which had been publishing among other periodicals the Stahlhelm, the central organ distributed by Franz Seldte. In this way Seldte became a member of the corporate board of Deutsche Tageszeitung Printers und Publishers, Inc, but he left the company together with Westarp in 1932.

In terms of circulation and content nothing changed for the Kreuzzeitung. Its target readership remained the same: the nobility, large landowners, industrialists, senior officers and civil servants. Foertsch and Rauschenbusch got along well together, with the result that from then on the same publishing house produced two daily newspapers for an identical target group. Both the Kreuzzeitung and the Deutsche Tageszeitung retained their individual departments and editors-in-chief. Then in the spring of 1932 the Kreuzzeitung was dealt another blow. On 3 April 1932, it had to report in a large announcement that its "editor-in-chief, Major (ret.) Georg Foertsch, died suddenly and unexpectedly at the age of 60 during the night of April 2, after having performed his editorial duties as usual into the evening hours just the day before". The Weltbühne headlined "Kreuz-Zeitung ( † ): A reptile perishes and dies the deserved national death." This did not mean the death of Georg Foertsch per se, but rather that due to his death the paper had become leaderless and would inevitably perish because of its various stakeholders and spheres of interest.

This assessment was proved true by the facts. On 2 May 1932, Kuno von Westarp renounced the rights to which he was entitled and resigned from his position on the corporate board. This meant that the Kreuzzeitung was now merely a brand name of the Deutsche Tageszeitung Printers and Publishers, Inc. Franz Seldte also left the publishing house in 1932. Westarp and Seldte realized that Franz von Papen's plans to integrate, rein in and dominate the National Socialists within a monarchist-conservative government could no longer be realized. This made the Kreuzzeitung obsolete. As was to be foreseen, circulation fell to 5,000 copies after the Reichstag elections in June 1932. Civil servants in particular now were oriented towards the Nazi Völkischer Beobachter.

== National Socialist period ==
On 18 September 1932, the paper was officially renamed (only) Kreuzzeitung. On the same day Hans Elze, Georg Foertsch's right-hand man, took over the vacant editor-in-chief's chair. On 16 January 1933, Deutsche Tageszeitung Printers and Publishers, Inc. changed its name to German Central Printers, Inc. The corporation remained under the leadership of Helmut Rauschenbusch.

Freedom of the press had already been restricted by emergency decrees during the Weimar Republic. Then on 28 February 1933, the Reich President's Decree for the Protection of the People and the State (commonly known as the 'Reichstag Fire Decree') came into force. It eliminated the fundamental right to freedom of opinion and freedom of the press and prohibited the dissemination of "incorrect news". What was correct and what was incorrect was henceforth determined by the Reich Ministry of Public Enlightenment and Propaganda. On 30 April 1933, the Reich Association of the German Press agreed to Gleichschaltung ('co-ordination'). As a result, Elze left the Kreuzzeitung on 2 August 1933. He "did not want to have dictated to him what should be reported". In addition, a decree now stipulated that an owner could have a stake in only one daily newspaper and that publishing houses with more than one daily newspaper were to be expropriated. Rauschenbusch decided in favor of the Kreuzzeitung. On 30 April 1934, the last issue of the Deutsche Tageszeitung appeared even though it had a much higher circulation than the Kreuzzeitung. Rauschenbusch however was no longer able to influence the content of the Kreuzzeitung. In order to enforce control over content, the Reich Press Chamber appointed editors-in-chief starting in 1935. They were no longer subordinate to the publishers but made editorial decisions on their own authority according to the guidelines set by the ministry of propaganda.

After numerous changes in the editorial staff and its leadership, the remaining subscribers of the newspaper knew by the summer of 1937 that the Kreuzzeitung's days were numbered. Until then the National Socialists had shown a certain consideration for the old-style conservative readers of the paper that was so rich in tradition. On 29 August 1937 the grace period ended. The front page read: "As of today we have taken over the Kreuzzeitung." Joseph Goebbels had appointed Erich Schwarzer, a staunch National Socialist, as the new editor-in-chief and integrated the Kreuzzeitung, along with other bourgeois conservative media, into the German Publishers. Until that time the editors of the Kreuzzeitung had still provided some reports thoroughly worth reading such as those by Hans Georg von Studnitz, who during a six-month stay in India in 1937 interviewed Gandhi and Nehru, among others. Some of the old members of the editorial staff reacted to the new tone set by Erich Schwarzer by resigning, others by a kind of 'work to rule'.

The last editor-in-chief, Eugen Mündler, was named in May 1938. The Kreuzzeitung – or what was left of it – appeared under his direction with text from the Berliner Tageblatt. Readers received the last issue of the Kreuzzeitung on 31 January 1939.

== Editors-in-chief ==
- 1848–1854 Hermann Wagener
- 1854–1872 Tuiscon Beutner
- 1872–1876 Philipp von Nathusius-Ludom
- 1876–1884 Benno von Niebelschütz
- 1884–1895 Wilhelm Joachim von Hammerstein
- 1895–1906 Hermann Kropatscheck
- 1906–1910 Justus Hermes
- 1910–1913 Theodor Müller-Fürer
- 1913–1932 Georg Foertsch
- 1932–1933 Hans Elze
- 1933 Rudolf Kötter
- 1934–1935 Rüdiger Robert Beer
- 1935–1937 Fritz Chlodwig Lange
- 1937–1938 Erich Schwarzer
- 1938–1939 Eugen Mündler

== Famous contributors (selection) ==
- Alexander Andrae, pseudonym: Andrae-Roman
- Berthold Auerbach
- Julius Bachem
- Theodor Fontane
- Hermann Ottomar Friedrich Goedsche, pseudonym: Sir John Retcliffe
- Wilhelm Conrad Gomoll
- Siegfried Hirsch
- Johann Georg Ludwig Hesekiel
- Otto Hoetzsch
- Helene von Krause, pseudonym: C. v. Hellen
- Hans Leuss
- Marx Möller
- Joachim Nehring
- Lothar Persius, fleet expert
- Julius Rodenberg
- Justus Scheibert, war correspondent
- Louis Schneider, Russia correspondent
- Gustav Schlosser
- Klaus-Peter Schulz
- Franz-Josef Sontag, Pseudonym: Junius Alter
- Adolf Stein
- Hans Stelter
- Louise zu Stolberg, under a pseudonym
- Rudolph Stratz, theater critic
- Hans Georg von Studnitz, Asia correspondent
- Alexander von Ungern-Sternberg, pseudonym: Sylvan

== Literature ==
- Bernhard Studt: Bismarck als Mitarbeiter der „Kreuzzeitung“ in den Jahren 1848 und 1849 [Bismarck as Contributor to the Kreuzzeitung in the years 1848 and 1849]. J. Kröger, Blankenese 1903.
- Hans Leuss: Wilhelm Freiherr von Hammerstein. 1881–1895 Chefredakteur der Kreuzzeitung. Auf Grund hinterlassener Briefe und Aufzeichnungen [Wilhelm Freiherr von Hammerstein. 1881-1895 Editor-in-Chief of the Kreuzzeitung. Based on Letters and Notes He Left Behind\. Walther, Berlin 1905.
- Luise Berg-Ehlers: Theodor Fontane und die Literaturkritik. Zur Rezeption eines Autors in der zeitgenössischen konservativen und liberalen Berliner Tagespresse [Theodor Fontane and Literary Criticism. On the Reception of an Author in the Contemporary Conservative and Liberal Berlin Daily Press]. Winkler, Bochum 1990, ISBN 3-924517-30-4.
- Meinolf Rohleder, Burkhard Treude: Neue Preußische (Kreuz-)Zeitung. Berlin (1848–1939). In: Heinz-Dietrich Fischer (Pub.): Deutsche Zeitungen des 17. bis 20. Jahrhunderts [German Newspapers of the 17th through 20th Centuries]. Pullach bei München 1972, S. 209–224.
- Burkhard Treude: Konservative Presse und Nationalsozialismus. Inhaltsanalyse der „Neuen Preußischen (Kreuz-) Zeitung“ am Ende der Weimarer Republik [Conservative Press and National Socialism: Content Analysis of the Neue Preußische (Kreuz-) Zeitung at the End of the Weimar Republic] (= Bochumer Studien zur Publizistik- und Kommunikationswissenschaft; 4). Studienverl. Brockmeyer, Bochum 1975.
- Theodor Fontane im literarischen Leben. Zeitungen und Zeitschriften, Verlage und Vereine [ Theodor Fontane in Literary Life. Newspapers and Magazines, Publishers and Associations (= Schriften der Theodor Fontane Gesellschaft; 3). Dargest. v. Roland Berbig unter Mitarb. v. Bettina Hartz. de Gruyter, Berlin u. a. 2000, ISBN 3-11-016293-8, S. 61–70.
- Dagmar Bussiek: „Mit Gott für König und Vaterland!“ Die Neue Preußische Zeitung (Kreuzzeitung) 1848–1892 [With God for King and Fatherland! The New Prussian Newspaper (Cross Newspaper) 1848-1892] (= Schriftenreihe von Stipendiatinnen und Stipendiaten der Friedrich-Ebert-Stiftung; 15). Lit, Münster u. a. 2002, ISBN 3-8258-6174-0.
