= Henning Albrecht =

German historian

Henning Albrecht (born 1973) is a German historian.

== Life ==
From 2003 to 2006, Albrecht was a research assistant at Historisches Seminar of the University of Hamburg and was awarded his doctorate there in 2007 with his dissertation Antiliberalismus und Antisemitismus: Hermann Wagener und die preußischen Sozialkonservativen 1855–1873. He is a freelance scientific consultant for the magazine Geo and has published numerous books as a writer since 2008. In 2016, Albrecht published a comprehensive biography of the Hamburg 6, artist Horst Janssen, for which he did five years of research.

== Publications ==
- Antiliberalismus und Antisemitismus. Hermann Wagener und die preußischen Sozialkonservativen 1855–1873. Otto-von-Bismarck-Stiftung. Wissenschaftliche Reihe; Band 12. Paderborn: Schöningh, 2010, ISBN 978-3-506-76847-6 (Review).
- „Pragmatisches Handeln zu sittlichen Zwecken“. Helmut Schmidt und die Philosophie (Studien der Helmut und Loki Schmidt-Stiftung; vol. 4). Ed. Temmen, Bremen 2008, ISBN 978-3-86108-635-2.
- Antiliberalismus und Antisemitismus. Hermann Wagener und die preußischen Sozialkonservativen 1855–1873 (Otto-von-Bismarck-Stiftung: Wissenschaftliche Reihe; vol. 12). Schöningh, Paderborn/München/Wien/Zürich 2010 (zugleich gekürzte Fassung von: Hamburg, Univ., Diss., 2007).
- Alfred Beit: Hamburger und Diamantenkönig. Hamburgische Wissenschaftliche Stiftung, ed. Ekkehard Nümann, University Press, Hamburg 2011.
- Adolph Lewisohn: Kupfermagnat im „Goldenen Zeitalter“. Hamburgische Wissenschaftliche Stiftung, ed. Ekkehard Nümann, University Press, Hamburg 2013.
- Horst Janssen. Ein Leben. Rowohlt, Reinbek bei Hamburg 2016, ISBN 978-3-498-00091-2.
- Diamanten, Dynamit und Diplomatie. Die Ludwig Julius Lippert. Hamburger Kaufleute in imperialer Zeit (Mäzene der Wissenschaft; vol. 20). Hamburgische Wissenschaftliche Stiftung, ed. Ekkehard Nümann, University Press, Hamburg 2018, ISBN 978-3-943423-45-7.
- 100 Jahre SBV Spar- und Bauverein Leichlingen eG. HistorikerVerlag, Hamburg 2019, ISBN 978-3-9817595-4-9.
- Troplowitz: Porträt eines Unternehmerpaares., Wallstein Verlag, Hamburg 2020, ISBN 978-3-8353-3752-7
