= Wusterhausen =

- Municipality
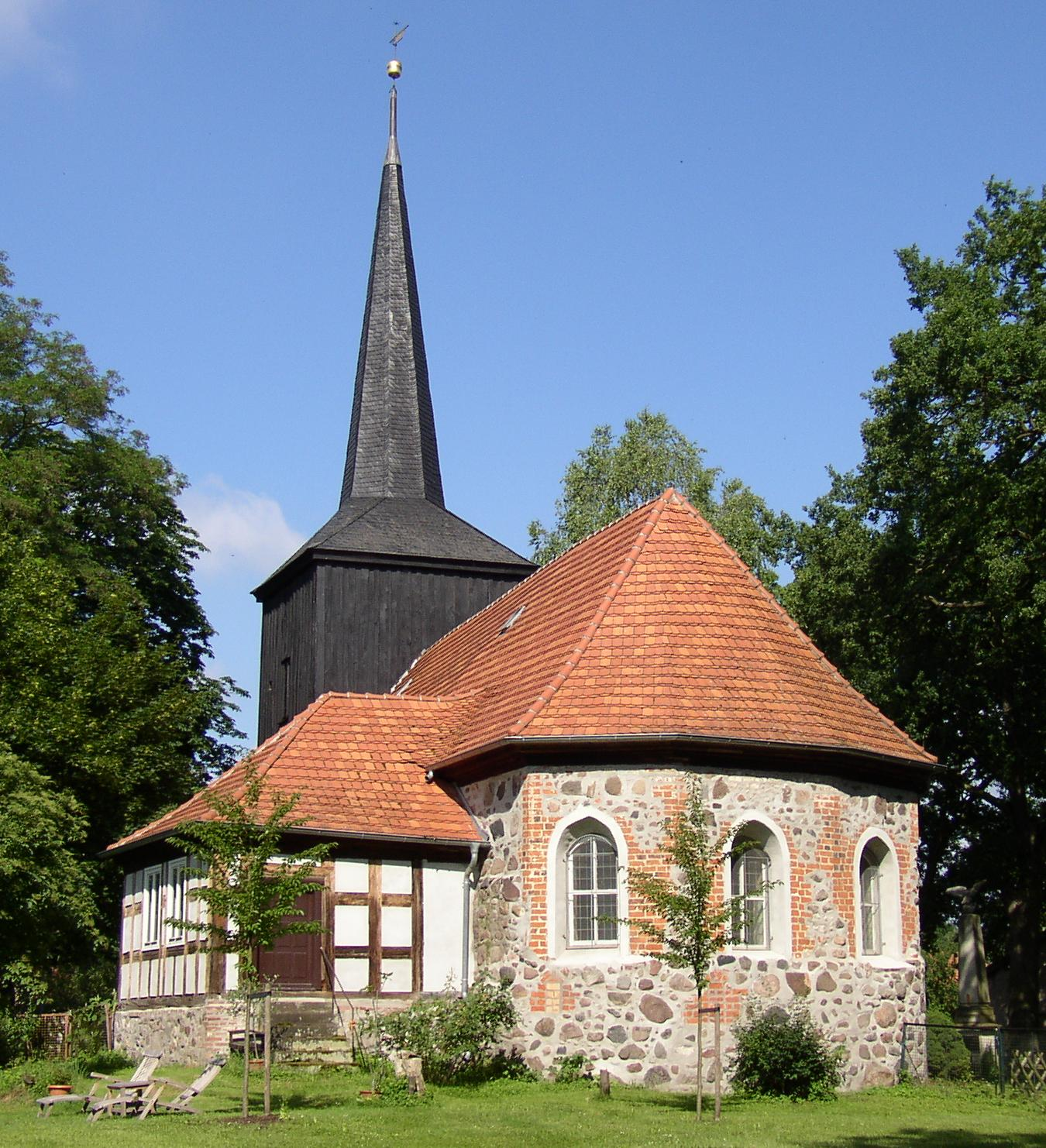
- Church in Nackel

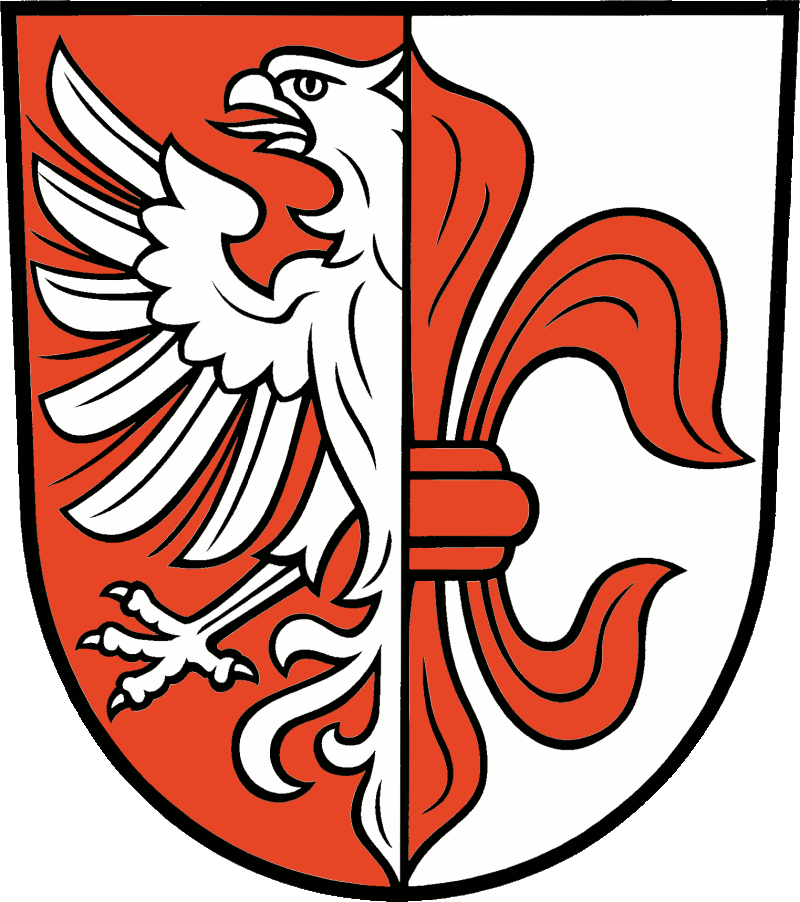
- Coat of arms

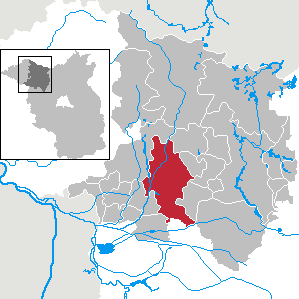
- Location of Wusterhausen within Ostprignitz-Ruppin district
- Interactive map of Wusterhausen
- Location within Germany Location within Brandenburg
- Coordinates: 52°52′59″N 12°28′00″E
- Country: Germany
- State: Brandenburg
- District: Ostprignitz-Ruppin

Government
  - Mayor (2018–26): Philipp Schulz (Ind.)

Area
  - Total: 195.42 km^{2} (75.45 sq mi)
- Elevation: 33 m (108 ft)

Population (2025-12-31)
  - Total: 5,725
  - Density: 29.30/km^{2} (75.88/sq mi)
- Time zone: UTC+01:00 (CET)
  - Summer (DST): UTC+02:00 (CEST)
- Postal codes: 16868
- Dialling codes: 033979
- Vehicle registration: OPR
- Website: www.wusterhausen.de

Wusterhausen (German pronunciation: [vʊstɐˈhaʊ̯zn̩]; official name Wusterhausen/Dosse) is a municipality in the Ostprignitz-Ruppin district, in northwestern Brandenburg, Germany. It is situated on the river Dosse, 7 km southeast of Kyritz, and 75 km northwest of Berlin.

== History ==
From 1815 to 1945, Wusterhausen was part of the Prussian Province of Brandenburg. From 1952 to 1990, it was part of the Bezirk Potsdam of East Germany.

== Demography ==
Development of population since 1875 within the current Boundaries (Blue Line: Population; Dotted Line: Comparison to Population development in Brandenburg state; Grey Background: Time of Nazi Germany; Red Background: Time of communist East Germany)

Recent Population Development and Projections (Population Development before Census 2011 (blue line); Recent Population Development according to the Census in Germany in 2011 (blue bordered line); Official projections for 2005-2030 (yellow line); for 2017-2030 (scarlet line); for 2020-2030 (green line)

Wusterhausen/Dosse: Population development
within the current boundaries (2020)

Year	Pop.	±% p.a.
1875	8,144	—
1890	8,151	+0.01%
1910	7,673	−0.30%
1925	7,912	+0.20%
1939	7,619	−0.27%
1950	11,550	+3.85%
1964	8,590	−2.09%

Year	Pop.	±% p.a.
1971	8,338	−0.42%
1981	7,561	−0.97%
1985	7,447	−0.38%
1990	7,266	−0.49%
1995	7,097	−0.47%
2000	6,857	−0.69%
2005	6,584	−0.81%

Year	Pop.	±% p.a.
2010	6,227	−1.11%
2015	6,013	−0.70%
2016	5,955	−0.96%
2017	5,885	−1.18%
2018	5,807	−1.33%
2019	5,761	−0.79%
2020	5,755	−0.10%

== People ==
- Dieter Helm (1941–2022), farmer and politician
- Hermann Wagener (1815–1889), journalist and politician
