= Johann Georg Ludwig Hesekiel =

German author (1819–1874)

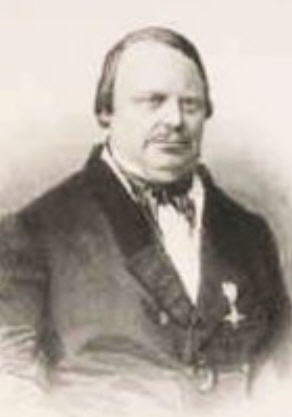
Johann Georg Ludwig Hesekiel

Johann George Ludwig Hesekiel (12 August 1819 – 26 February 1874) was a German author from Halle, where his father, distinguished as an author of sacred poetry, was a Lutheran pastor.

Hesekiel studied history and philosophy in the universities of Halle, Jena and Berlin, and devoted himself during his early life to journalism and literature. In 1848 he settled in Berlin, where he lived until his death, achieving a considerable reputation as a writer and as editor of the newspaper Neue Preussische Zeitung.

He attempted many different kinds of literary work, the most ambitious being perhaps his patriotic songs Preussenlieder, of which he published a volume during the revolutionary excitement of 1848–1849. Another collection, Neue Preussenlieder, was published in 1864 after the Second Schleswig War, and a third in 1870, Gegen die Franzosen, Preussische Kriegs- und Königslieder, during the Franco-Prussian War.

Among his novels were Unter dem Eisenzohn (1864) and Der Schultheiss vom Zeyst (1875). The best known of his works is his biography of Prince Otto von Bismarck (Das Buch vom Fursten Bismarck) (3rd edition, 1873; English translation by R. H. Mackenzie).
