= Dannenwalde Manor =

German castle

Coordinates: 53.0788°N 13.1867°E

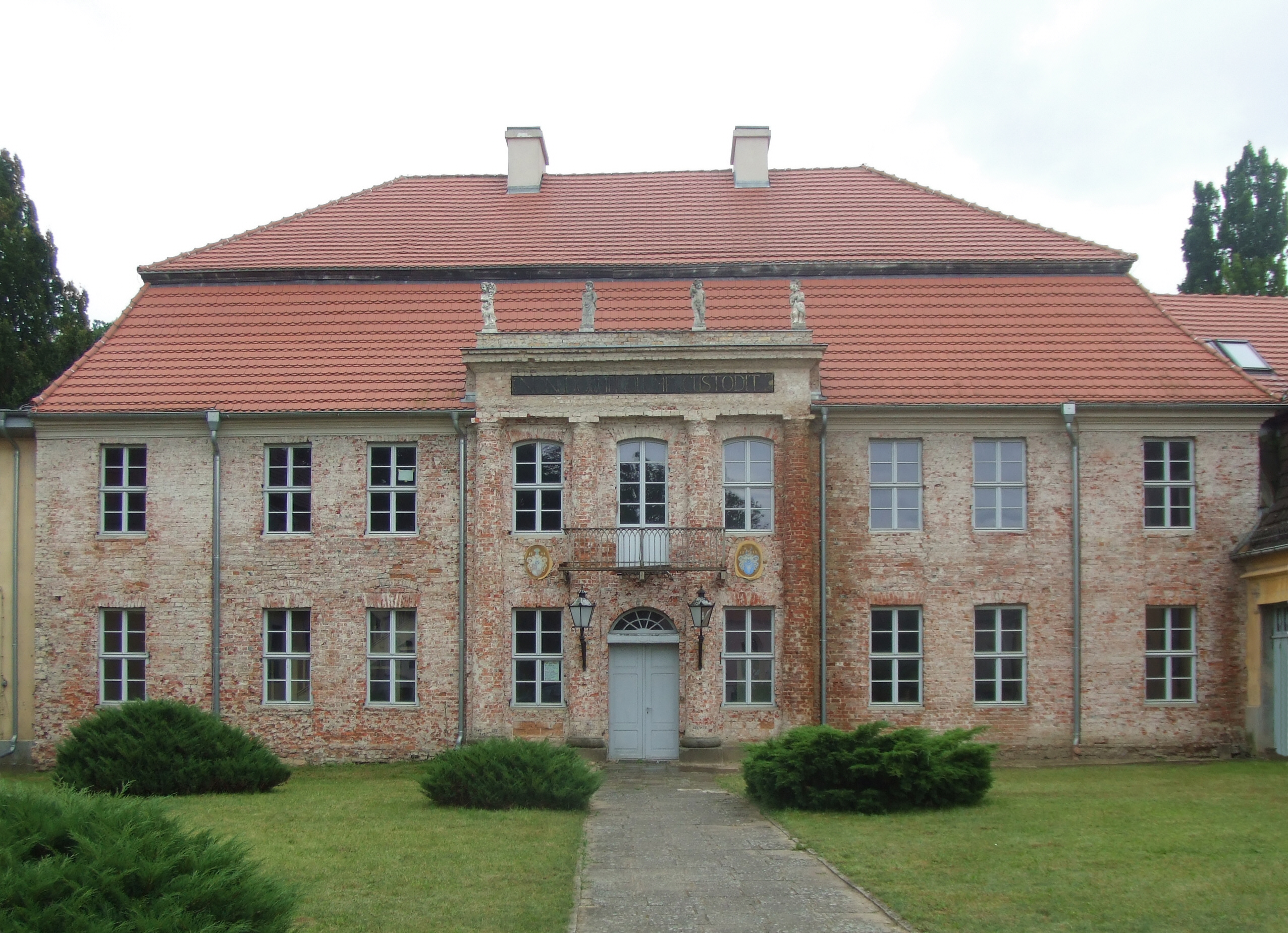
Main Building

Manor Dannenwalde known as Herrenhaus Dannenwalde is a castle located in the village of Dannenwalde (Gransee), Brandenburg (eastern Germany). It was built in the late seventeenth century and was transformed over the centuries, most recently in 1937. The manor consists of a main building flanked by two wings that thus form a courtyard.

Opposite the main entrance is a neo-Gothic chapel (1821), in its axis, which houses the tombs of the von Waldow family, owner, until 1945. The mansion is being restored.

== History ==
Initially Dannenwalde was in the territory of what became the Duchy of Mecklenburg-Strelitz. Its owners in the Middle Ages were the knights of Prignitz. It was in 1692 that the area was acquired by Waldow, from Brandenburg, and it remain in their ownership will remain until their expulsion in 1945. One of the last owners was the Prussian politician Wilhelm von Waldow (1856-1937). The painter and poet Alexander von Ungern-Sternberg (1806-1868) died there. He married Caroline von Waldow and he died with his brother, Franz von Waldow, chamberlain to the Prussian court.

In 1692 the guardians of Ernst Friedrich pledged by book the estate at the Mecklenburg Kammerrat Adolf Friedrich von Waldow, who was in 1707 invested so. Rolf Hansen (1904-1990) used the castle as a setting in 1941 for his film Der Weg ins Freie based on the novel by Arthur Schnitzler (1908). The film shows the Castle just prior to its being looted and the decrepitude of the postwar period. However although the castle was sacked after the war, it was not completely destroyed.

During the German Democratic Republic it became a secondary school named Karl Sperling-Oberschule after the German Communist resistance fighter.

An association of the Friends of Nature acquired it in 1990 to house bicycle hikers, but the main building remains empty, despite the restoration of the roof. The wings are home accommodation and the mansion is still being restored. The chapel is restored.

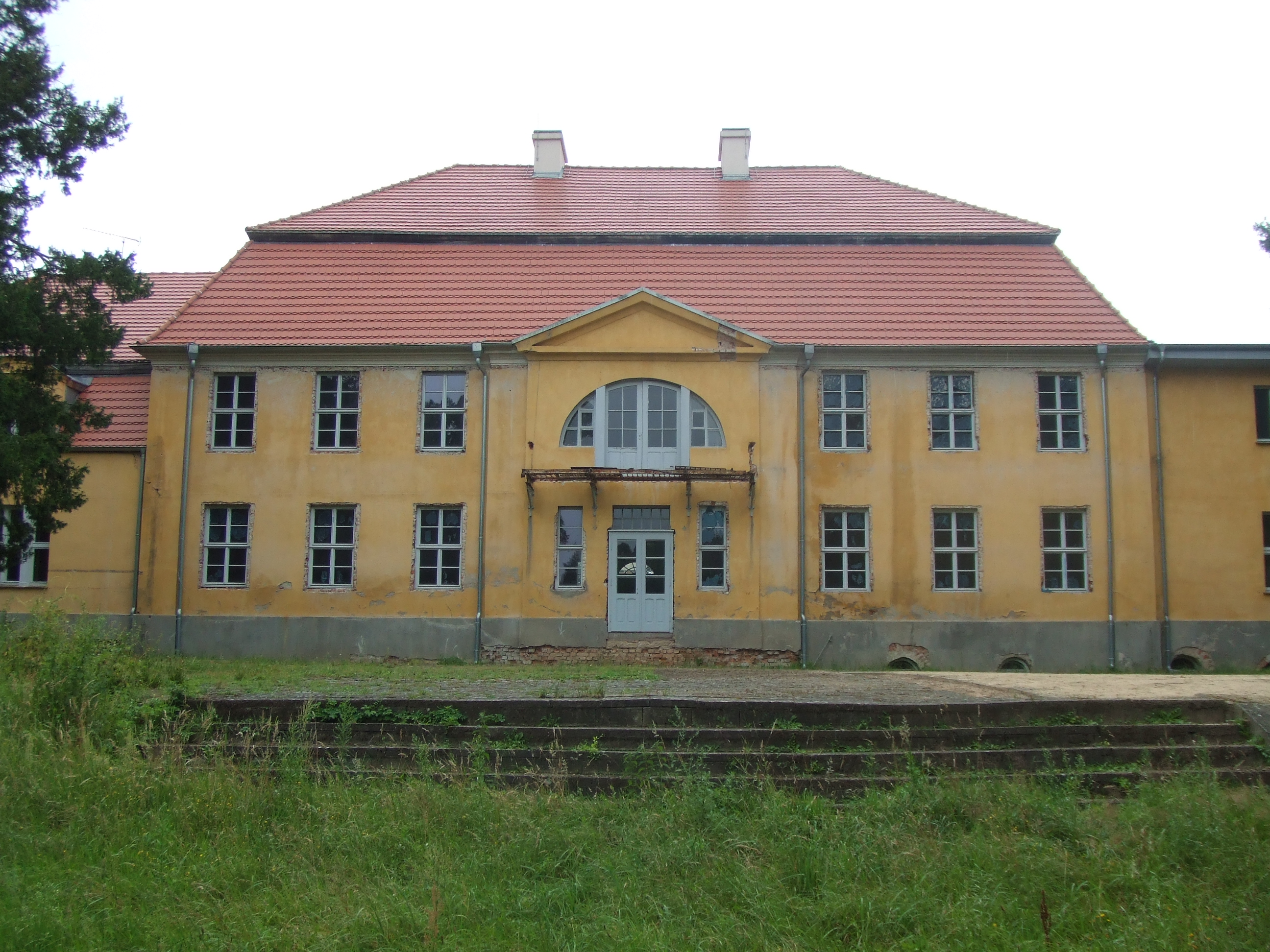
Main Building in 2007

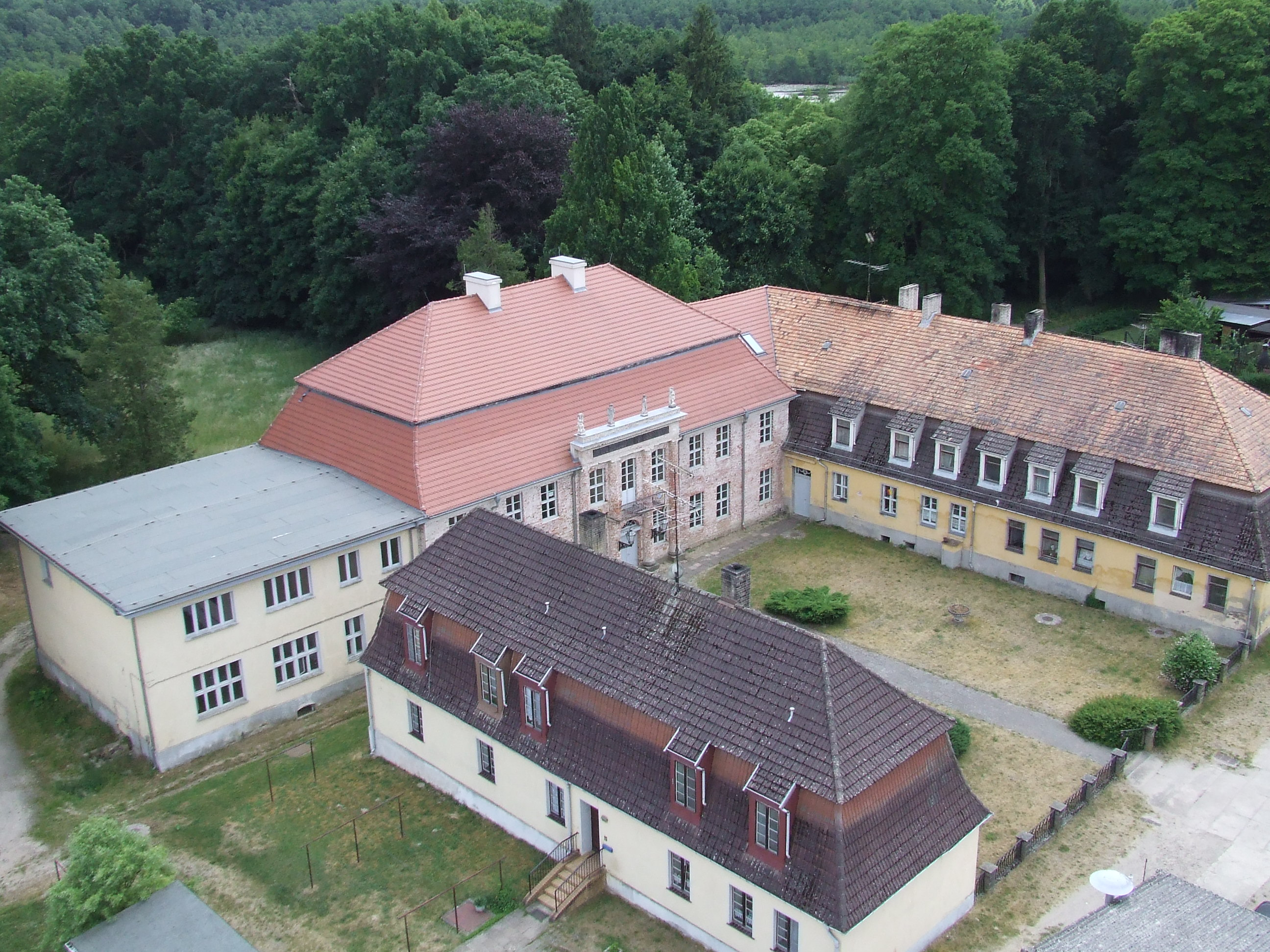
The manor in 2008

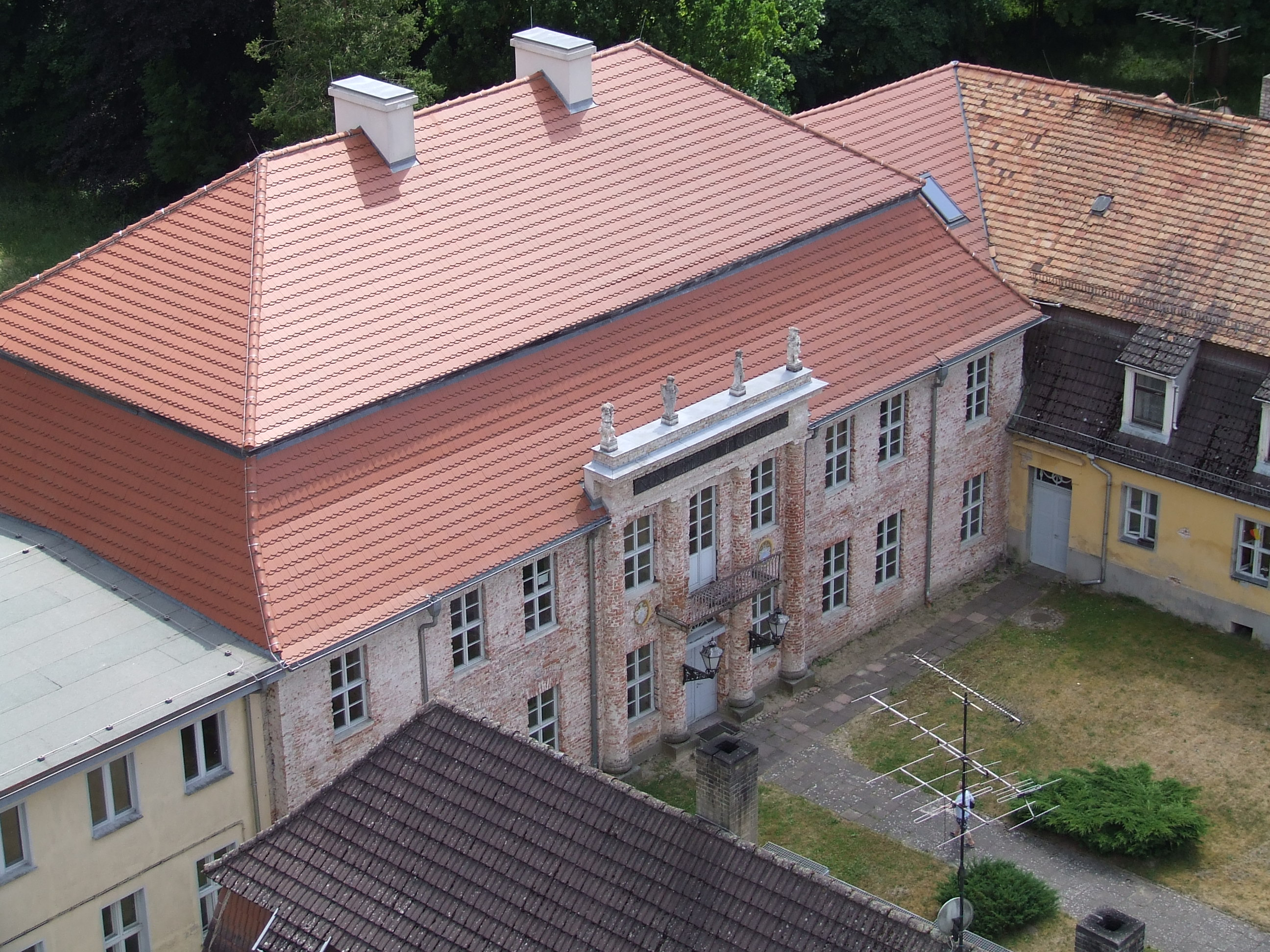
Toit du corps de logis, côté cour d'honneur

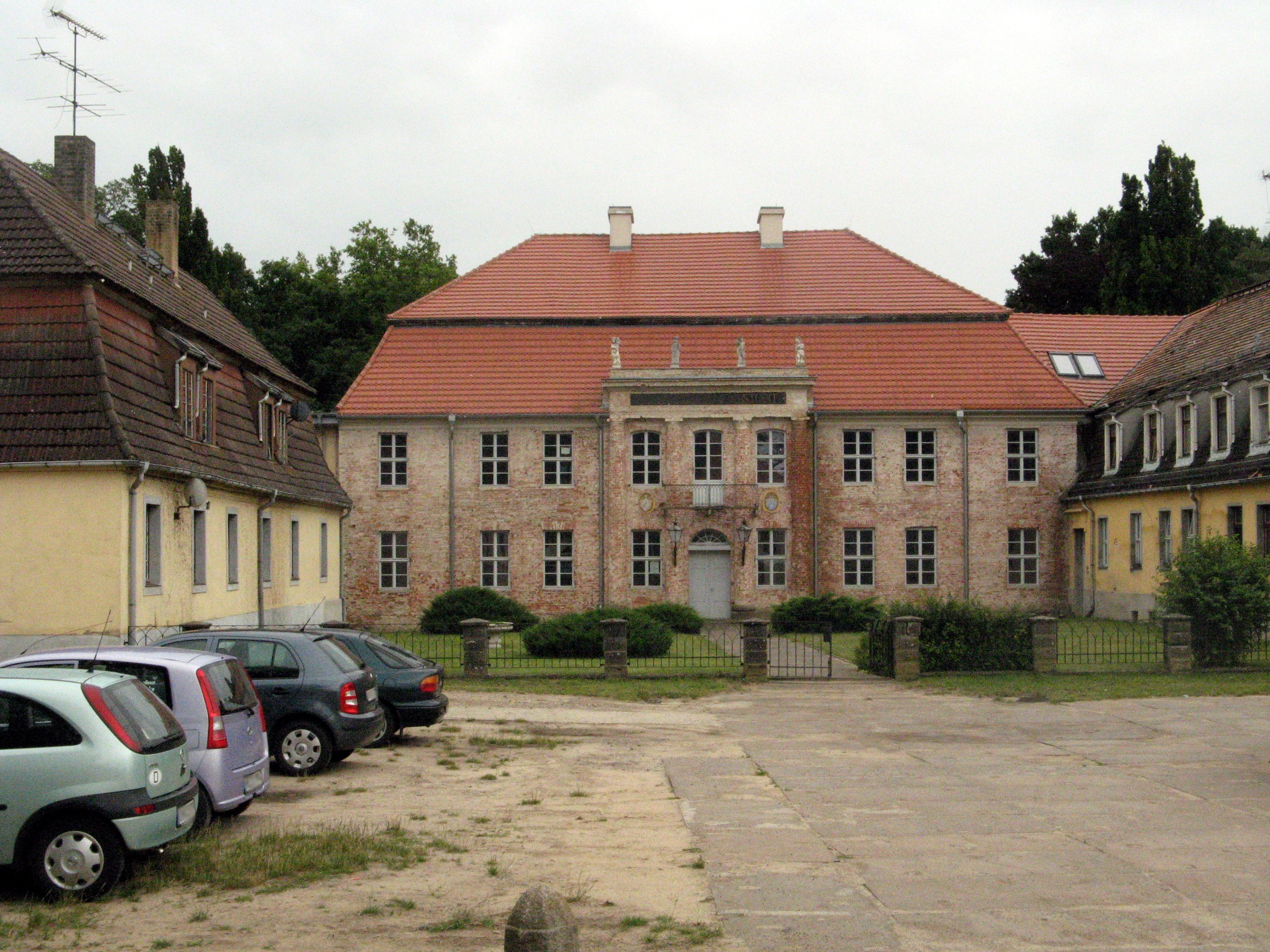
La cour d'honneur

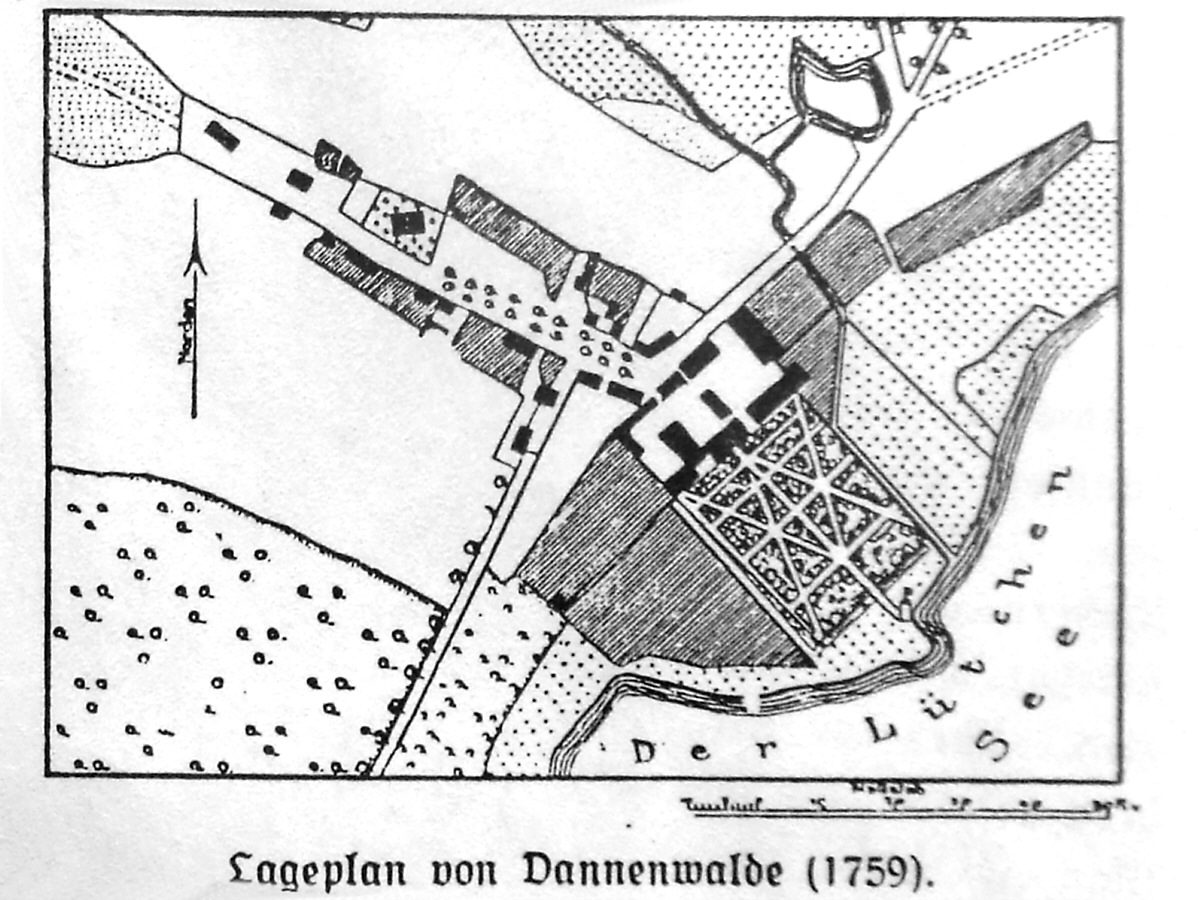
Plan of Dannenwalde (1759)

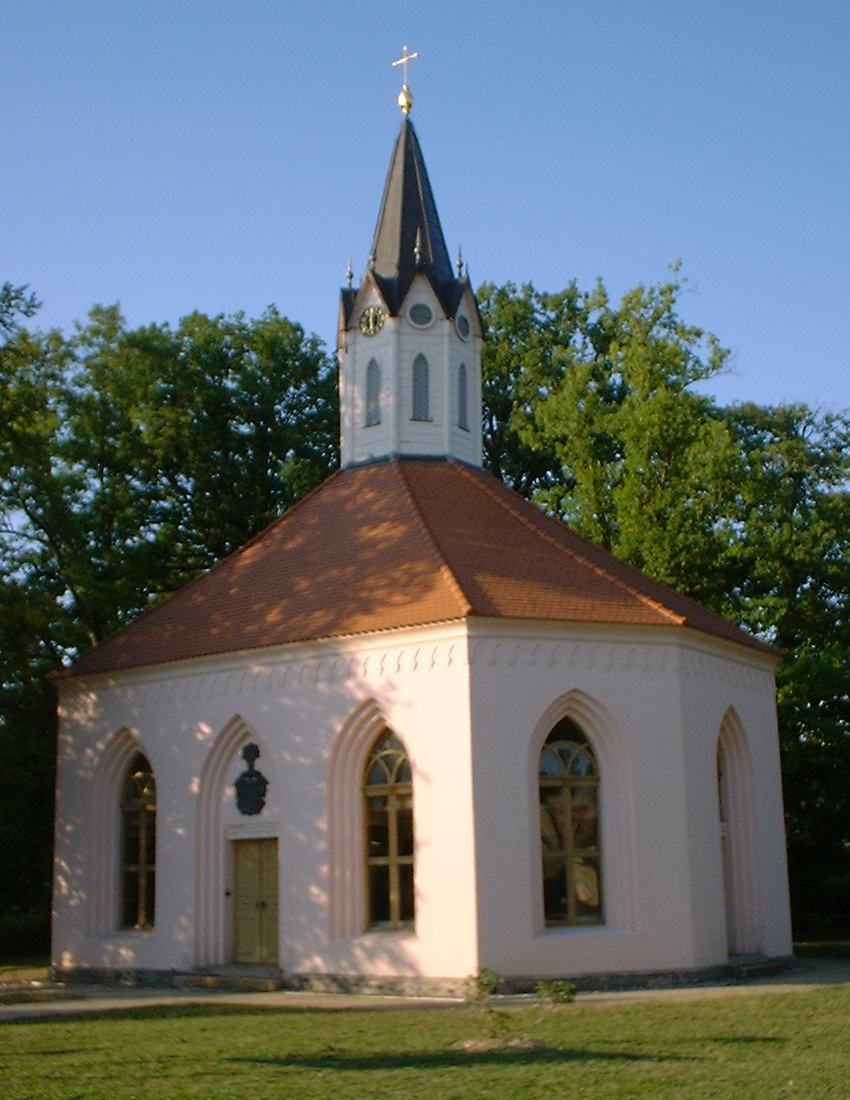
chapel of the cyclists

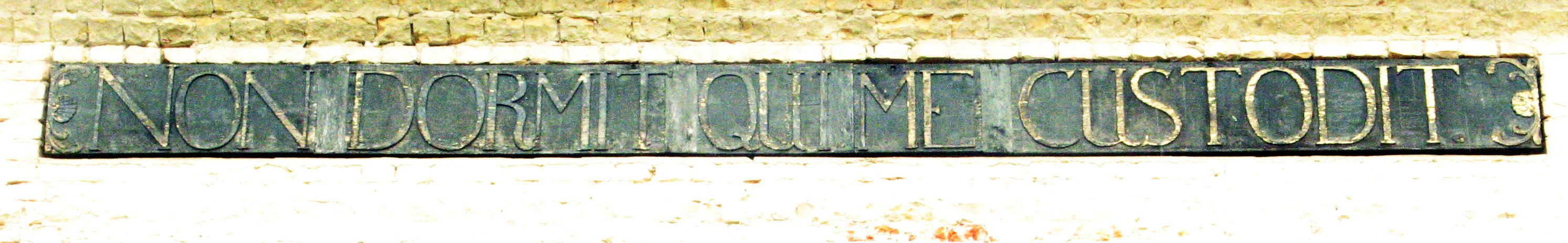
Latin inscription of Psalm 121 on the pediment of the Dannenwalde Manor House
