= Prussian Union of Churches =

German Protestant church body

- The union created one of the largest Protestant bodies in Europe, bringing together a large part of German Protestants into a single church. 1817 Prussia in dark blue.
- Classification: Protestant
- Orientation: United Protestant (Lutheran and Calvinist)
- Region: Prussia
- Headquarters: Berlin
- Origin: 1817
- Merger of: Lutheran and Calvinist congregations in Prussia
- 1 July 2003: subsumed into the Union of Evangelical Churches (EKD); seat moved from Berlin to Hanover

The Prussian Union of Churches (known under multiple other names) was a major Protestant church body which emerged in 1817 from a series of decrees by Frederick William III of Prussia that united both Lutheran and Reformed denominations in Prussia. Although not the first of its kind, the Prussian Union was the first to occur in a major German state.

It became the biggest independent religious organization in the German Empire and later Weimar Germany, with about 18 million parishioners. The church underwent two schisms (one permanent since the 1830s, one temporary 1934–1948), due to changes in governments and their policies. After being the favoured state church of Prussia in the 19th century, it suffered interference and oppression at several times in the 20th century, including the persecution of many parishioners.

In the 1920s, the Second Polish Republic and Lithuania, and in the 1950s to 1970s, East Germany, the People's Republic of Poland, and the Soviet Union, imposed permanent or temporary organizational divisions, eliminated entire congregations, and expropriated church property, transferring it either to secular uses or to different churches more favoured by these various governments. In the course of the Second World War, church property was either damaged or destroyed by strategic bombing, and by war's end, many parishioners had fled from the advancing Soviet forces. After the war, complete ecclesiastical provinces vanished following the flight and expulsion of Germans living east of the Oder-Neiße line.

The two post-war periods saw major reforms within the Church, strengthening the parishioners' democratic participation. The Church counted many renowned theologians as its members, including Friedrich Schleiermacher, Julius Wellhausen (temporarily), Adolf von Harnack, Karl Barth (temporarily), Dietrich Bonhoeffer, and Martin Niemöller (temporarily), to name only a few. In the early 1950s, the church body was transformed into an umbrella, after its prior ecclesiastical provinces had assumed independence in the late 1940s. Following the decline in number of parishioners due to the German demographic crisis and growing irreligion, the Church was subsumed into the Union of Evangelical Churches in 2003.

== Status and official names ==
Years	Official name
1817–1821	Prussian Union of Churches
1821–1845	Evangelical Church in the Royal Prussian Lands
1845–1875	Evangelical State Church of Prussia
1875–1922	Evangelical State Church of Prussia's older Provinces
1922–1953	Evangelical Church of the old-Prussian Union
1953–2004	Evangelical Church of the Union
2004–present	incorporated into Union of Evangelical Churches

The many changes in the Church throughout its history are reflected in its several name changes. These include:

- 1817–1821: The church union was still being regulated by Prussian officials, and no official name was taken up for it yet. Informal names reported elsewhere included Prussian Union of Churches and the Union of Churches in Prussia.
- 1821–1845: Evangelical Church in the Royal Prussian Lands – the state church
- 1845–1875: Evangelical State Church of Prussia – the state church besides other recognised Protestant church bodies
- 1875–1922: Evangelical State Church of Prussia's older Provinces – the state church in the old provinces of Prussia besides other recognised Protestant church bodies
- 1922–1933, 24 June: Evangelical Church of the old-Prussian Union – an independent church among other recognised Protestant church bodies
- 24 June to 15 July 1933: State control abolished the freedom of religion and a Nazi-loyal leadership was imposed
- 15 July 1933 – 28 February 1934: Evangelical Church of the old-Prussian Union under new streamlined leadership
- 1 March to 20 November 1934: The streamlined leadership abolished the Evangelical Church of the old-Prussian Union as an independent church body and merged it in the new Nazi-submissive German Evangelical Church
- 29 May 1934 – 1945: Confessing Christians declared that the imposed Nazi-inspired (so-called German Christian) leadership had brought the church to a schism, with the Confessing Church and their newly created bodies (partially established since January 1934) representing the true Evangelical church.
- 20 November 1934 – 1945: The Evangelical Church of the old-Prussian Union restored by the verdict of the Landgericht (Berlin court), resulting in two church bodies–one Nazi-recognised and one gradually driven underground–each claiming to represent the true church.
- 1945–1953: The Evangelical Church of the old-Prussian Union partially cleansed its leading bodies of German Christians and appointed Nazi opponents and persons of moderate neutrality.
- 1953–2003: Evangelical Church of the Union, an independent ecclesiastical umbrella among other recognised Protestant umbrellas and church bodies.
- 2004: The Evangelical Church of the Union merged in the Union of Evangelical Churches.

== History ==
The Calvinist (Reformed) and Lutheran Protestant churches had existed in parallel after Prince-Elector John Sigismund declared his conversion from Lutheranism to Calvinism in 1617, with most of his subjects remaining Lutheran. However, a significant Calvinist minority had grown due to the reception of thousands of Calvinists refugees fleeing oppression by the Catholic Counter-Reformation in Bohemia, France (Huguenots), the Low Countries, and Wallonia or migrants from Jülich-Cleves-Berg, the Netherlands, Poland, or Switzerland. Their descendants made up the bulk of the Calvinists in Brandenburg. At issue over many decades was how to unite into one church.

=== Royal attempts to merge Lutherans and Calvinists ===
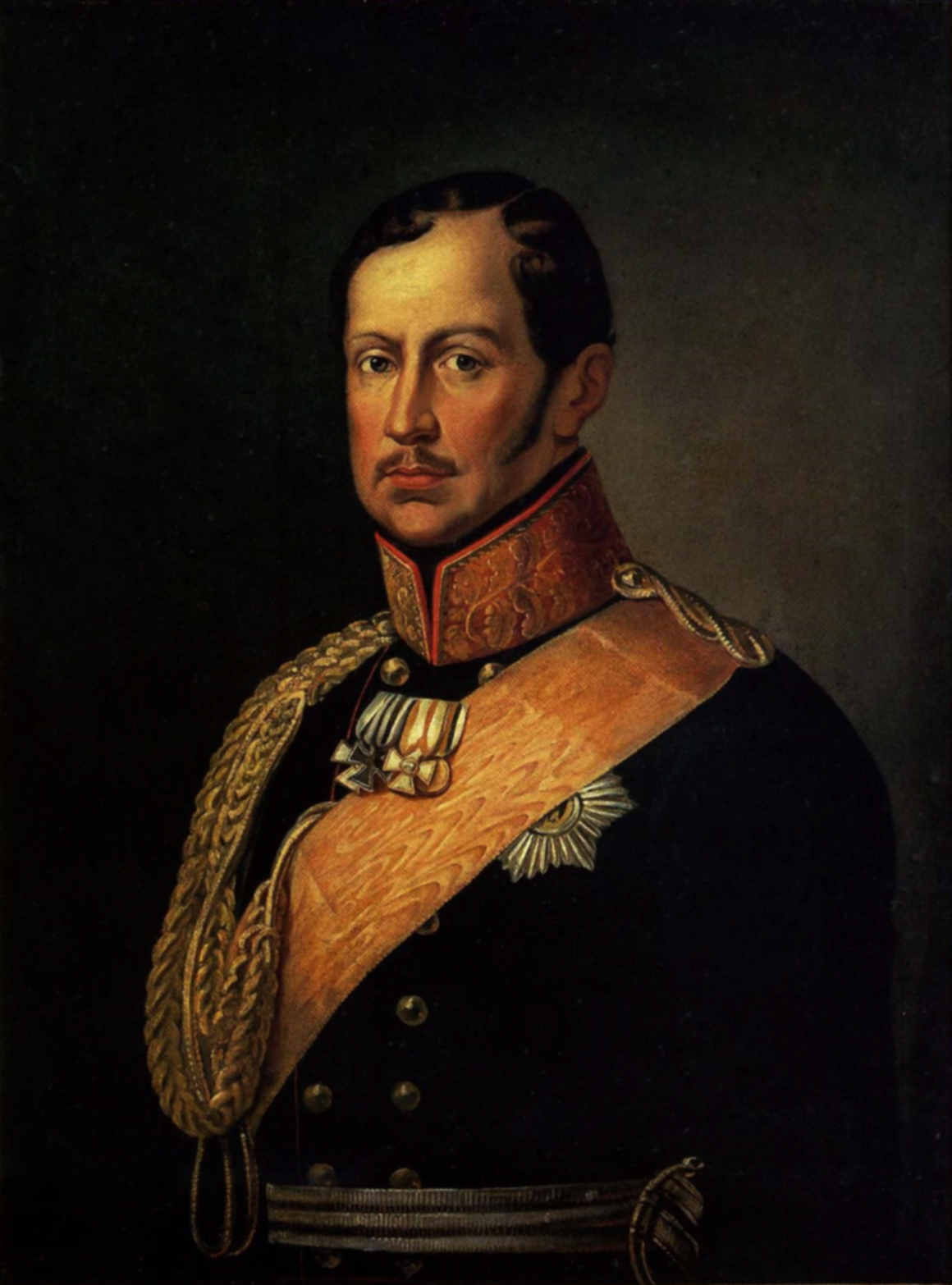
Frederick William III, King of Prussia and Prince of Neuchâtel

One year after he ascended to the throne in 1798, Frederick William III, being Supreme Governor of the Protestant Churches, decreed a new common liturgical agenda (service book) to be published for use in both the Lutheran and Reformed congregations. The king, a Reformed Christian, lived in a denominationally mixed marriage with the Lutheran Queen Louise, which is why they never partook of Communion together. A commission was formed in order to prepare this common agenda. This liturgical agenda was the culmination of the efforts of his predecessors to unify the two Protestant churches in Prussia and in its predecessor, the Electorate of Brandenburg.

Major reforms to the administration of Prussia were undertaken after the defeat by Napoléon's army at the Battle of Jena-Auerstedt. As a part of these reforms, the separate leadership structures of both the Lutheran Church (with its chief body, the all-Prussian Lutherisches Oberkonsistorium (Lutheran Upper Consistory), 1750–1808, and the Reformed Churches (with their chief bodies, the all-Prussian Französisches Oberkonsistorium /Consistoire supérieur (French Supreme Consistory); 1701–1808, and the all-Prussian German-speaking Reformed Kirchendirektorium (Church Directory); 1713–1808) were abolished and the tasks of the three administrations were taken on by the Sektion für den Kultus und öffentlichen Unterricht (Section for the cult and public instruction), also competent for the Catholic church and the Jewish congregations, forming a department in the Prussian Ministry of the Interior.

Since the Reformation, the two Protestant denominations in Brandenburg had had their own ecclesiastical governments under state control through the crown as Supreme Governor. However, under the new absolutism then in vogue, the churches were under a civil bureaucratic state supervision by a ministerial section. In 1808, the Reformed Friedrich Schleiermacher, pastor of Trinity Church (Berlin-Friedrichstadt), issued his ideas for a constitutional reform of the Protestant Churches, also proposing a union.

Under the influence of the centralising movement of absolutism and the Napoleonic Age, after the defeat of Napoléon I in 1815, rather than reestablishing the previous denominational leadership structures, all religious communities were placed under a single consistory in each of the then ten Prussian provinces. This differed from the old structure in that the new leadership administered the affairs of all faiths; Catholics, Jews, Lutherans, Mennonites, Moravians, and Calvinists (Reformed Christians).

In 1814, the Principality of Neuchâtel had been restituted to the Berlin-based Hohenzollern. In 1815, Frederick William III agreed that this French-speaking territory could join the Swiss Confederation (which was not yet an integrated federation, but a mere confederacy) as the Canton of Neuchâtel. The church body of the prevailingly Calvinist Neuchâtelians did not rank as a state church but was independent, since at the time of its foundation in 1540, the ruling princely House of Orléans-Longueville (Valois-Dunois) was Catholic. Furthermore, no Lutheran congregation existed in Neuchâtel. Thus the Reformed Church of Neuchâtel Canton was not an object of Frederick William's Union policy.

In January 1817, the cult and public instruction section was separated off as the Prussian Ministry of the Spiritual, Educational and Medical Affairs, usually called Cult Ministry (Kultusministerium). Karl vom Stein zum Altenstein was appointed as minister. The Reformed churches and the Lutheran church were thus administered by one department within the same ministry. The ministry introduced the preaching gown (German: Talar) as the usual clerical clothing.

On 27 September 1817, Frederick William announced, through a text written by Eylert, that Potsdam's Reformed court and garrison congregation, led by Court Preacher Rulemann Friedrich Eylert, and the Lutheran garrison congregation, both of whom used the Calvinist Garrison Church, would unite into one Evangelical Christian congregation on Reformation Day, 31 October, the 300th anniversary of the Reformation. Already the day before Lutherans and Reformed Christians celebrated the Lord's Supper together in Berlin's Lutheran St. Nicholas' Church.

On 7 November, Frederick William expressed his desire to see the Protestant congregations around Prussia follow this example, and become Union congregations. Lutherans of the Lutheran state church of Nassau-Saarbrücken, and Calvinists in the southerly Saar area had already formed a church united in administration on 24 October (Saarbrücken Union). However, because of the unique constitutive role of congregations in Protestantism, no congregation was forced by the King's decree into merger. Thus, in the years that followed, many Lutheran and Reformed congregations did follow the example of Potsdam, and became merged congregations, while others maintained their former Lutheran or Reformed denomination.

Especially in many Rhenish places, Lutherans and Calvinists merged their parishes to form United Protestant congregations. When Prussia finally received a parliament in 1847, some church leadership offices included a seat in the first chamber of non-elected, but appointed members (succeeded by the House of Lords of Prussia as of 1854).

A number of steps were taken to effect the number of pastors that would become Union pastors. Candidates for ministry, from 1820 onwards were required to state whether they would be willing to join the Union. All of the theological faculty at the Rhenish Frederick William's University in Bonn belonged to the Union. An ecumenical ordination vow in which the pastor avowed allegiance to the Evangelical Church was also formulated.

=== Quarrels over the union ===
In 1821, the administrative umbrella comprising the Protestant congregations in Prussia adopted the name Evangelical Church in the Royal Prussian Lands. At Christmas time the same year, a common liturgical agenda was produced, as a result of a great deal of personal work by Frederick William, as well by the commission that he had appointed in 1798. The agenda was not well received by many Lutherans, as it was seen to compromise the wording of the Words of Institution to the point that the Real Presence was not proclaimed. More importantly, the increasing coercion of the civil authorities into church affairs was viewed as a new threat to Protestant freedom of a kind not seen since the Papacy.

In 1822, the Protestant congregations were directed to use only the newly formulated Agenda for worship. This met with strong objections from Lutheran pastors around Prussia. Despite the opposition, 5,343 out of 7,782 Protestant congregations were using the new agenda by 1825. Frederick William III took notice of Daniel Amadeus Neander, who had become his subject by the annexation of Royal Saxon territory in 1816, and who had helped the king to implement the agenda in his Lutheran congregations. In 1823, the king made him the Provost of St. Petri Church(then the highest ranking ecclesiastical office in Berlin) and an Oberkonsistorialrat (supreme consistorial councillor) and thus a member of the Marcher Consistory. He became an influential confidant of the king and one of his privy councillors and a referee to Minister Stein zum Altenstein.

After in 1818, 16 provincial synods – in German parlance a synod is a church parliament rather than the district it represents – had convened. Minister Stein zum Altenstein and the King were disappointed over the outcome, especially after the Marcher provincial synod, disliking the whole idea of parishioners' participation in church governance. The king then preferred a rather top-down organization and introduced the ecclesiastical leadership function of general superintendents, which had already existed in some provinces before the reform.

In 1828, Neander was appointed first General Superintendent of the Kurmark (1829–1853). Thus Neander fought in three fields for the new agenda, on the governmental level, within the church, and in the general public, by publications such as Luther in Beziehung auf die evangelische Kirchen-Agende in den Königlich Preussischen Landen (1827). In 1830, the king bestowed him the very unusual, title of honorary bishop. The king also bestowed titles on other collaborators in implementing the Union, with the honorary title of bishop, such as Eylert (1824), Johann Heinrich Bernhard Dräseke (1832), and Wilhelm Ross (1836).

Debate and opposition to the new agenda persisted until 1829, when a revised edition of the agenda was produced. This liturgy incorporated a greater level of elements from the Lutheran liturgical tradition. With this introduction, the dissent against the agenda was greatly reduced. However, a significant minority felt this was merely a temporary political compromise with which the king could continue his ongoing campaign to establish a civil authority over their freedom of conscience.

In June 1829, Frederick William ordered that all Protestant congregations and clergy in Prussia give up the names Lutheran or Reformed and take up the name Evangelical. The decree was not to enforce a change of belief or denomination, but was only a change of nomenclature. Subsequently, the term Evangelical (German: evangelisch) became the usual general expression for Protestant in the German language. In April 1830, Frederick William, in his instructions for the upcoming celebration of the 300th anniversary of the presentation of the Augsburg Confession, ordered all Protestant congregations in Prussia to celebrate the Lord's Supper using the new agenda. Rather than having the unifying effect that Frederick William desired, the decree created a great deal of dissent amongst Lutheran congregations. In 1830, Johann Gottfried Scheibel, professor of theology at the Silesian Frederick William's University, founded in Breslau the first Lutheran congregation in Prussia, independent of the Union and outside of its umbrella organisation Evangelical Church in the Royal Prussian Lands.

In a compromise with some dissenters, who had now earned the name Old Lutherans, in 1834 Frederick William issued a decree, which stated that Union would only be in the areas of governance, and in the liturgical agenda, and that the respective congregations could retain their denominational identities. However, in a bid to quell future dissensions of his Union, dissenters were also forbidden from organising sectarian groups.

In defiance of this decree, a number of Lutheran pastors and congregations – like that in Breslau – believing it was contrary to the Will of God to obey the king's decree, continued to use the old liturgical agenda and sacramental rites of the Lutheran church. Becoming aware of this defiance, officials sought out those who acted against the decree. Pastors who were caught were suspended from their ministry. If suspended pastors were caught acting in a pastoral role, they were imprisoned. Having now shown his hand as a tyrant bent on oppressing their religious freedom, and under continual police surveillance, the Evangelical Church in the Royal Prussian Lands began disintegrating.

=== Old Lutheran schism ===
By 1835, many dissenting Old Lutheran groups were looking to emigration as a means to finding religious freedom. Some groups emigrated to the United States and to Australia in the years leading up to 1840. They formed what are today the Lutheran Church–Missouri Synod (the second largest Lutheran denomination in the U.S), and the Lutheran Church of Australia, respectively.

With the death of Frederick William III in 1840, King Frederick William IV ascended to the throne. He released the pastors who had been imprisoned, and allowed the dissenting groups to form religious organisations in freedom. In 1841, the Old Lutherans who had stayed in Prussia convened in a general synod in Breslau and founded the Evangelical-Lutheran Church in Prussia, which merged in 1972 with Old Lutheran church bodies in other German states to become today's Independent Evangelical-Lutheran Church (German: Selbständige Evangelisch-Lutherische Kirche, or SELK). On 23 July 1845, the royal government recognised the Evangelical-Lutheran Church in Prussia and its congregations as legal entities. In the same year the Evangelical Church in the Royal Prussian Lands reinforced its self-conception as the Prussian State's church and was renamed as the Evangelical State Church of Prussia (German: Evangelische Landeskirche Preußens).

=== Protestant churches in Prussia's new provinces ===
In 1850, the predominantly Catholic principalities of Hohenzollern-Hechingen and Hohenzollern-Sigmaringen, ruled by Catholic princely branches of the Hohenzollern family, joined the Kingdom of Prussia and became the Province of Hohenzollern. There had hardly been any Protestants in the tiny area, but with the support from Berlin congregational, structures were built up. Until 1874, three (later altogether five) congregations were founded and in 1889, organised as a deanery of its own. The congregations were stewarded by the Evangelical Supreme Church Council like congregations of expatriates abroad. On 1 January 1899, the congregations became an integral part of the Prussian state church. No separate ecclesiastical province was established, but the deanery was supervised by that of the Rhineland. In 1866, Prussia annexed the Kingdom of Hanover (then converted into the Province of Hanover), the Free City of Frankfurt upon Main, the Electorate of Hesse, and the Duchy of Nassau (combined as Province of Hesse-Nassau) as well as the Duchies of Schleswig and Holstein (becoming the Province of Schleswig-Holstein), all prevailingly Lutheran territories, where Lutherans and the minority of Calvinists had not united. After the trouble with the Old Lutherans in pre-1866 Prussia, the Prussian government refrained from imposing the Prussian Union onto the church bodies in these territories. Also the reconciliation of the Lutheran majority of the citizens in the annexed states with their new Prussian citizenship was not to be further complicated by religious quarrels. Thus the Protestant organisations in the annexed territories maintained their prior constitutions or developed new, independent Lutheran or Calvinist structures.

=== Foreign commitment of the Church ===
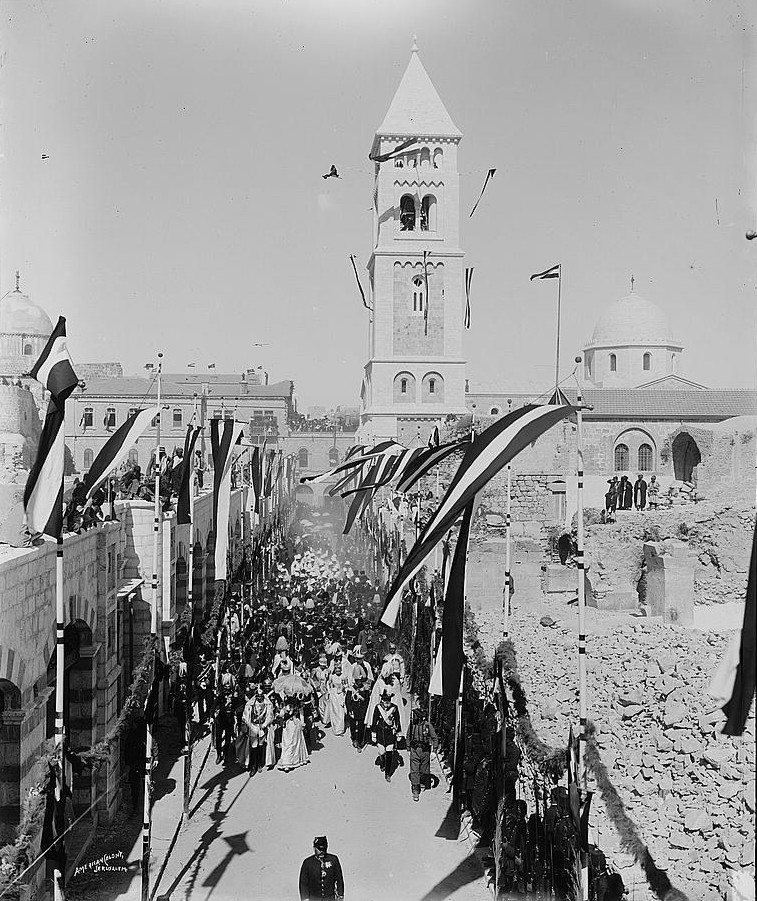
King William II of Prussia, then Supreme Governor of the Evangelical Church of Prussia's older Provinces, and Queen Augusta Victoria after the inauguration of the Evangelical Church of the Redeemer in Jerusalem (Reformation Day, 31 October 1898).

At the instigation of Frederick William IV the Anglican Church of England and the Evangelical Church in the Royal Prussian Lands founded the Anglican-Evangelical Bishopric in Jerusalem (1841–1886). Its bishops and clergy proselytised in the Holy Land among the non-Muslim native population and German immigrants, such as the Templers. But Calvinist, Evangelical, and Lutheran expatriates in the Holy Land from Germany and Switzerland also joined the German-speaking congregations.

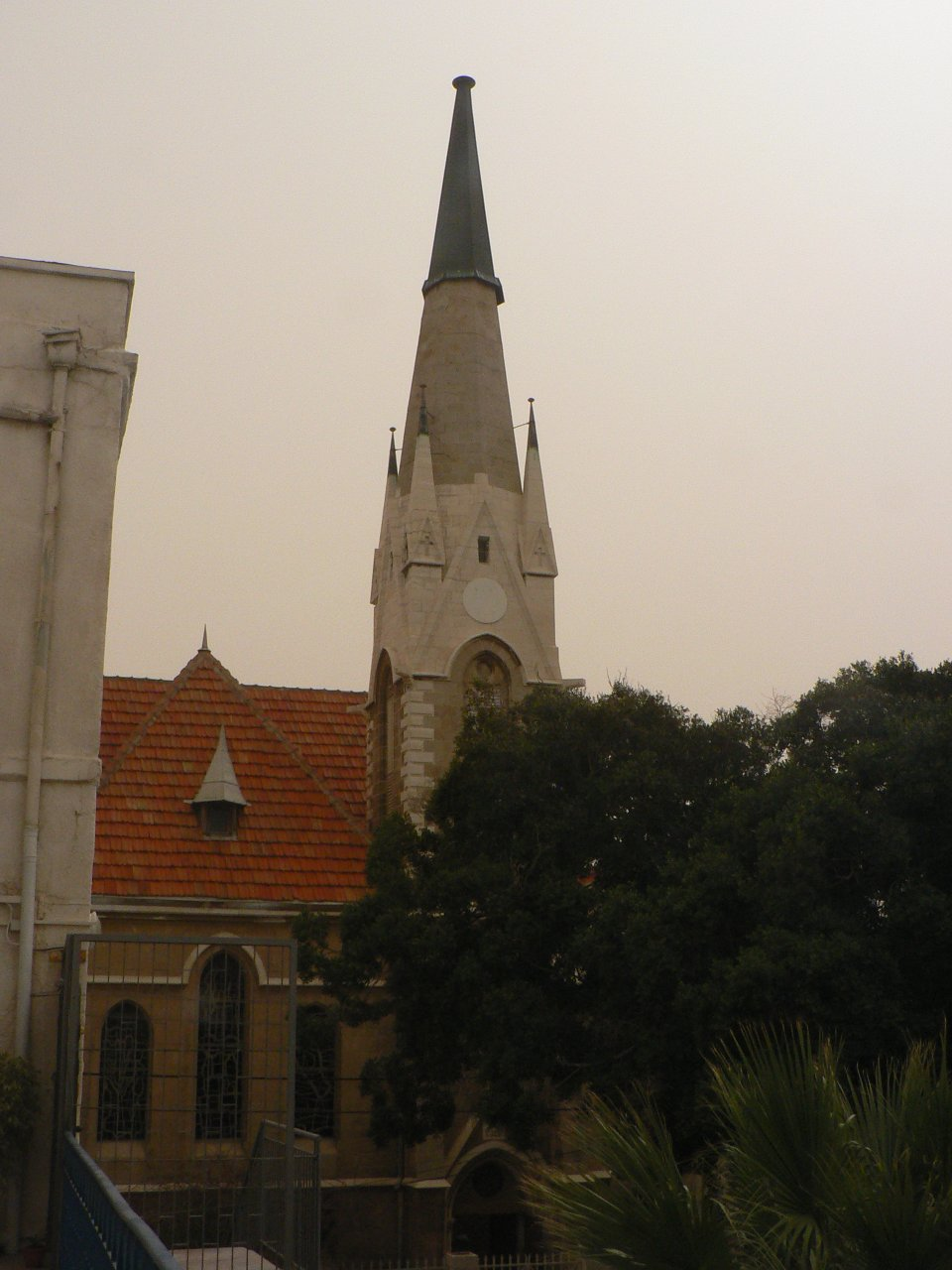
Immanuel Church (Tel Aviv-Yafo) in Rechov Beer-Hofmann # 15 (רחוב בר הופמן)

A number of congregations of Arabic or German language emerged in Beit Jalla (Ar.), Beit Sahour (Ar.), Bethlehem of Judea (Ar.), German Colony (Haifa) (Ger.), American Colony (Jaffa) (Ger.), Jerusalem (Ar. a. Ger.), Nazareth (Ar.), and Waldheim (Ger.).

With financial aid from Prussia, other German states, the Association of Jerusalem, the Evangelical Association for the Construction of Churches, and others, a number of churches and other premises were built. But there were also congregations of emigrants and expatriates in other areas of the Ottoman Empire (2), as well as in Argentina (3), Brazil (10), Bulgaria (1), Chile (3), Egypt (2), Italy (2), the Netherlands (2), Portugal (1), Romania (8), Serbia (1), Spain (1), Switzerland (1), United Kingdom (5), and Uruguay (1) and the foreign department of the Evangelical Supreme Church Council (see below) stewarded them.

=== Structures and bodies of the Evangelical State Church of Prussia ===
The Evangelical State Church of Prussia stayed abreast of the changes and was renamed in 1875 as the Evangelical State Church of Prussia's older Provinces (German: Evangelische Landeskirche der älteren Provinzen Preußens). Its central bodies were the executive Evangelical Supreme Church Council (German: Evangelischer Oberkirchenrat, EOK, est. in 1850, renamed the Church Chancery in 1951), seated in Jebensstraße # 3 (Berlin, 1912–2003) and the legislative General Synod (German: Generalsynode).

The General Synod first convened in June 1846, presided over by Daniel Neander, and consisting of representatives of the clergy, the parishioners, and members nominated by the king. The General Synod found agreement on the teaching and the ordination, but the king did not confirm any of its decisions. After 1876 the general synod comprised 200 synodals, 50 laymen parishioners, 50 pastors, 50 deputies of the Protestant theological university faculties as ex officio members, and 50 synodals appointed by the king.

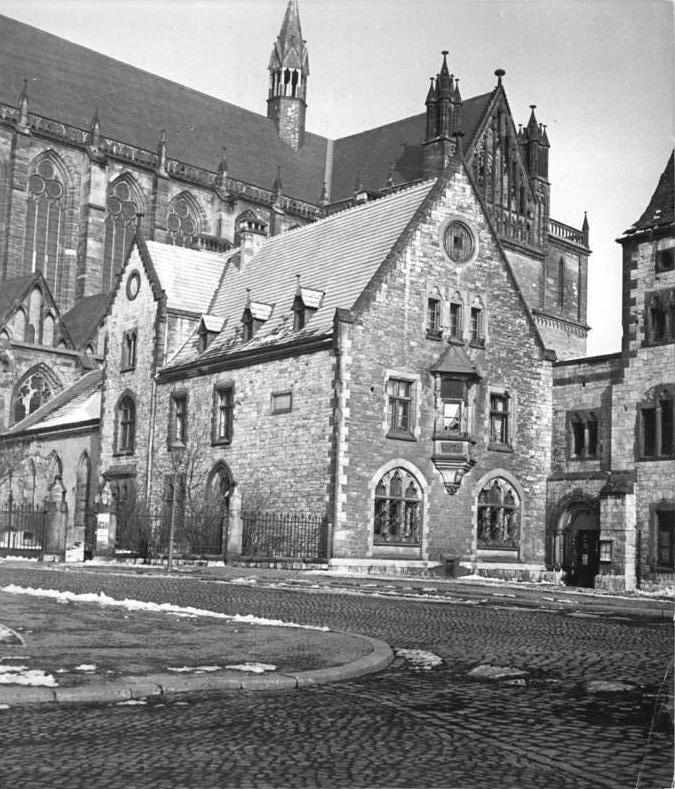
The Saxony provincial consistory, in the background Magdeburg's Cathedral

The Evangelical State Church of Prussia's older Provinces had substructures, called ecclesiastical province (German: Kirchenprovinz; see ecclesiastical province of the Evangelical State Church of Prussia), in the nine pre-1866 political provinces of Prussia, to wit in the Province of East Prussia (homonymous ecclesiastical province), in Berlin, which had become a separate Prussian administrative unit in 1881, and the Province of Brandenburg (Ecclesiastical Province of the March of Brandenburg for both), in the Province of Pomerania (homonymous), in the Province of Posen (homonymous), in the Rhine Province and since 1899 in the Province of Hohenzollern (Ecclesiastical Province of the Rhineland), in the Province of Saxony (homonymous), in the Province of Silesia (homonymous), in the Province of Westphalia (homonymous), and in the Province of West Prussia (homonymous).

Every ecclesiastical province had a provincial synod representing the provincial parishioners and clergy, and one or more consistories led by general superintendents. The ecclesiastical provinces of Pomerania and Silesia had two (after 1922), those of Saxony and the March of Brandenburg, three – from 1911 to 1933 the latter even four – general superintendents, annually alternating in the leadership of the respective consistory.

The two western provinces, Rhineland and Westphalia, had the strongest Calvinist background, since they included the territories of the former Duchies of Berg, Cleves, and Jülich, the Counties of Mark and Tecklenburg, Siegerland, and the Principality of Wittgenstein, all of which had Calvinist traditions. Already in 1835, the provincial church constitutions (German: Provinzial-Kirchenordnung) provided for a general superintendent and congregations in both ecclesiastical provinces with presbyteries of elected presbyters.

This level of parishioners' democracy emerged in the other Prussian provinces only in 1874, when Otto von Bismarck, in his second term as Prussian Minister-President (9 November 1873 – 20 March 1890), gained the parliamentary support of the National Liberals in the Prussian State Diet (German: Landtag). Prussia's then minister of education and religious affairs, Adalbert Falk, put the bill through, which extended the combined Rhenish and Westphalian presbyterial and consistorial church constitution to all of the Evangelical State Church in Prussia. Therefore, the terminology is different, In the Rhineland and Westphalia a presbytery is called a Presbyterium, and a member thereof is a Presbyter, while in the other provinces the corresponding terms are Gemeindekirchenrat ("congregation council") and Älteste (elder).

Authoritarian traditions competed with liberal and modern ones. Committed congregants formed Kirchenparteien, which nominated candidates for elections to the parochial presbyteries and the provincial or church-wide general synods. Obe strong Kirchenpartei was the Konfessionellen ("the denominationals"), congregants of Lutheran tradition, who had submitted in the process of uniting the denominations after 1817 and still fought the Prussian Union. They promoted Neo-Lutheranism and strictly opposed the liberal stream of Kulturprotestantismus, promoting rationalism and a reconcialition of belief and modern knowledge, advocated by the Deutscher Protestantenverein.

Another Kirchenpartei was the anti-liberal Volkskirchlich-Evangelische Vereinigung (VEV, "People's Church-Evangelical Association"), established in the mid-19th century, colloquially the German: Mittelpartei ("Middle Party"). VEV affirmed the Prussian Union, criticised the Higher criticism in Biblical science, but still claimed the freedom of science and theology. The Middle Party's long-serving president and member of the general synod (1891–1915) was the well-known law professor Wilhelm Kahl. Kahl was a leader of the (DVP), who provided important input into the section of the Weimar Constitution dealing with the relationship between church and state.

By far the most successful Kirchenpartei in church elections was the anti-liberal Positive Union, which had much in common with the Konfessionellen, but affirmed the Prussian Union. Therefore, the Positive Union often formed coalitions with the Konfessionellen. King William I of Prussia sided with the Positive Union. Before 1918, most consistories and the Evangelical Supreme Church Council were dominated by proponents of the Positive Union. In 1888 King William II of Prussia could only appoint the liberal Adolf von Harnack as professor of theology at the Frederick William University of Berlin after long public debates and protests by the Evangelical Supreme Church Council.

The ever-growing societal segment of the workers among the Evangelical parishioners had little affinity to the Church, which was dominated in their pastors and functionaries by members of the bourgeoisie and aristocracy. A survey held in early 1924 determine that in 96 churches in Berlin, Charlottenburg, and Schöneberg, only 9–15% of the parishioners actually attended the services. Congregations in workers' districts, often comprising tens of thousands of parishioners, usually counted hardly more than a hundred congregants in regular services. William II and his wife Augusta Viktoria of Schleswig-Holstein-Sonderburg-Augustenburg, who presided over the Evangelical Association for the Construction of Churches, often financed church construction for poor congregations and promoted massive programmes of church constructions especially in workers' districts, but could not increase the attraction of the State Church for the workers. However, it earned the queen the nickname Kirchen-Juste. More impetus reached the charitable work of the State Church, which was much carried on by the Inner Mission and the diaconal work of deaconesses.

Modern anti-Semitism emerged in the 1870s, with its prominent proponent Heinrich Treitschke, and its famous opponent Theodor Mommsen, a son of a pastor and later Nobel Prize laureate. Anti-Semitism also found supporters among the proponents of traditional Protestant Anti-Judaism, as promoted by the Prussian court preacher Adolf Stoecker. The new King William II dismissed Stoecker in 1890 because of political agitation by his anti-Semitic Christian Social Party, neo-paganism, and personal scandals.

Most leading clerics and church functionaries were connected with the traditional Prussian elite; so the State Church considered World War I to be a just war. Pacifists, like Hans Francke (Church of the Holy Cross, Berlin), Walter Nithack-Stahn (William I Memorial Church, Charlottenburg [a part of today's Berlin]), and Friedrich Siegmund-Schultze (Evangelical Auferstehungsheim, Friedensstraße No. 60, Berlin) made up a small, but growing minority among the clergy. The State Church supported the issuances of nine series of war bonds and subscribed itself for war bonds amounting to 41 million marks (ℳ).

=== Territorial and constitutional changes after 1918 ===
With the end of the Prussian monarchy in 1918 also the king's function as summus episcopus (Supreme Governor of the Evangelical Church) ceased to exist. Furthermore, the Weimar Constitution of 1919 decreed the separation of state and religion. Thus its new constitution of 29 September 1922 the Evangelical State Church of Prussia's older Provinces reorganised in 1922 under the name Evangelical Church of the old-Prussian Union (German: Evangelische Kirche der altpreußischen Union, EKapU or ApU). The church did not bear the term State Church within its name any more, taking into account that its congregations now spread over six sovereign states. The new name was after a denomination, not after a state any more. It became a difficult task to maintain the unity of the church, with some of the annexing states being opposed to the fact that church bodies within their borders keep a union with German church organisations.

The territory comprising the Ecclesiastical Province of Posen was now largely Polish, and except of small fringes that of West Prussia had been either seized by Poland or Danzig. The trans-Niemen part of East Prussia (Klaipėda Region) became a League of Nations mandate as of 10 January 1920 and parts of Prussian Silesia were either annexed by Czechoslovakia (Hlučín Region) or Poland (Polish Silesia), while four congregations of the Rhenish ecclesiastical province were seized by Belgium, and many more became part of the Mandatory Saar (League of Nations).

The Evangelical congregation in Hlučín, annexed by Czechoslovakia in 1920, joined thereafter the Silesian Evangelical Church of Augsburg Confession of Czech Silesia. The Polish government ordered the disentanglement of the Ecclesiastical Province of Posen of the Evangelical State Church of Prussia's older Provinces – except of its congregations remaining with Germany. The now Polish church body then formed the United Evangelical Church in Poland (German: Unierte Evangelische Kirche in Polen, Polish: Ewangelicki Kościół Unijny w Polsce), which existed separately from the Evangelical-Augsburg Church in Poland until 1945, when most of the former's congregants fled the approaching Soviet army or were subsequently denaturalised by Poland due to their German native language and expelled (1945–1950).

The United Evangelical Church in Poland also incorporated the Evangelical congregations in Pomerellia, ceded by Germany to Poland in February 1920, which prior used to belong to the Ecclesiastical Province of West Prussia, as well as the congregations in Soldau and 32 further East Prussian municipalities, which Germany ceded to Poland on 10 January 1920, prior belonging to the Ecclesiastical Province of East Prussia.

A number of congregations lay in those northern and western parts of the Province of Posen, which were not annexed by Poland and remained with Germany. They were united with those congregations of the westernmost area of West Prussia, which remained with Germany, to form the new Posen-West Prussian ecclesiastical province. The congregations in the eastern part of West Prussia remaining with Germany, joined the Ecclesiastical Province of East Prussia on 9 March 1921.

The 17 congregations in East Upper Silesia, ceded to Poland in 1922, constituted on 6 June 1923 as United Evangelical Church in Polish Upper Silesia. The church formed an old-Prussian ecclesiastical province until May 1937, when the German Polish Geneva Accord on Upper Silesia expired. Between 1945 and 1948 it underwent the same fate like the United Evangelical Church in Poland. The congregations in Eupen, Malmedy, Neu-Moresnet, and St. Vith, located in the now Belgian East Cantons, were disentangled from the Evangelical Church of the old-Prussian Union as of 1 October 1922 and joined until 1923/1924 the Union des églises évangéliques protestantes de Belgique, which later transformed into the United Protestant Church in Belgium. They continue to exist until this very day.

The congregations in the territory seized by the Free City of Danzig, which prior belonged to the Ecclesiastical Province of West Prussia, transformed into the Regional Synodal Federation of the Free City of Danzig (German: Landessynodalverband der Freien Stadt Danzig). It remained an ecclesiastical province of the Evangelical Church of the old-Prussian Union, since the Danzig Senate (government) did not oppose cross-border church bodies. The Danzig ecclesiastical province also co-operated with the United Evangelical Church in Poland as to the education of pastors, since its Polish theological students of German native language were hindered to study at German universities by restrictive Polish pass regulations.

The congregations in the League of Nations mandate of the Klaipėda Region (German: Memelgebiet) continued to belong to the Ecclesiastical Province of East Prussia. When from 10 to 16 January 1923 neighbouring Lithuania conquered the mandatory territory and annexed it on 24 January, the situation of the congregations there turned precarious. On 8 May 1924 Lithuania and the mandatory powers France, Italy, Japan and the United Kingdom signed the Klaipėda Convention, granting autonomy to the inhabitants of the Klaipėda Region. This enabled the Evangelical Church of the old-Prussian Union to sign a contract with the Memel autonomous government (German: Landesdirektorium) under Viktoras Gailius on 23 July 1925 in order to maintain the affiliation of the congregations with the Evangelical Church of the old-Prussian Union.

The Evangelical congregations in the Klaipėda Region were disentangled from the Ecclesiastical Province of East Prussia and formed the Regional Synodal Federation of the Memel Territory (Landessynodalverband Memelgebiet), being ranked an ecclesiastical province directly subordinate to the Evangelical Supreme Church Council with an own consistory in Klaipėda (est. in 1927), led by a general superintendent (at first Franz Gregor, after 1933 Otto Obereigner). On 25 June 1934 the tiny church body of the Oldenburgian exclave Birkenfeld merged in the Rhenish ecclesiastical province.

The 1922 constitution of the Evangelical Church of the old-Prussian Union included much stronger presbyterial structures and forms of parishioners' democratic participation in church matters. The parishioners of a congregation elected a presbytery and a congregants' representation (German: Gemeindevertretung). A number of congregations formed a deanery (German: Kirchenkreis), holding a deanery synod (German: Kreissynode) of synodals elected by the presbyteries. The deanery synodals elected the deanery synodal board (German: Kreissynodalvorstand), in charge of the ecclesiastical supervision of the congregations in a deanery, which was chaired by a superintendent, appointed by the provincial church council (German: Provinzialkirchenrat) after a proposal of the general superintendent.

The parishioners in the congregations elected synodals for their respective provincial synod – a legislative body – which again elected its governing board the provincial church council, which also included members delegated by the consistory. The consistory was the provincial administrative body, whose members were appointed by the Evangelical Supreme Church Council. Each consistory was chaired by a general superintendent, being the ecclesiastical, and a consistorial president (German: Konsistorialpräsident), being the administrative leader.

The provincial synods and the provincial church councils elected from their midst the synodals of the general synod, the legislative body of the overall Evangelical Church of the old-Prussian Union. The general synod elected the church senate (German: Kirchensenat), the governing board presided by the praeses of the general synod, elected by the synodals. Johann Friedrich Winckler held the office of praeses from 1915 until 1933. The church senate appointed the members of the Evangelical Supreme Church Council, the supreme administrative entity, which again appointed the members of the consistories.

==== Identity and self-conception in the Weimar years ====
The majority of parishioners stayed in a state of unease with the changes and many were skeptical towards the democracy of the Weimar Republic. Nationalist conservative groups dominated the general synods. Authoritarian traditions competed with liberal and modern ones. The traditional affinity to the former princely holders of the summepiscopacy often continued. So when in 1926 the leftist parties successfully launched a plebiscite to the effect of the expropriation of the German former regnal houses without compensation, the Evangelical Church of the old-Prussian Union called up for an abstention from the election, holding up the commandment Thou shalt not steal. Thus the plebiscite missed the minimum turnout and failed.

A problem was the spiritual vacuum, which emerged after the church stopped being a state church. Otto Dibelius, since 1925 general superintendent of Kurmark within the Ecclesiastical Province of the March of Brandenburg, published his book Das Jahrhundert der Kirche (The century of the Church), in which he declared the 20th century to be the era when the Evangelical Church may for the first time develop freely and gain the independence God would have wished for, without the burden and constraints of the state church function. He regarded the role of the church as even the more important, since the state of the Weimar Republic – in his eyes – would not provide the society with binding norms any more, thus this would be the task of the church. The church would have to stand for the defense of the Christian culture of the Occident. In this respect Dibelius regarded himself as consciously anti-Jewish, explaining in a circular to the pastors in his general superintendency district of Kurmark, "that with all degenerating phenomena of modern civilisation Judaism plays a leading role". His book was one of the most read on church matters in that period.

While this new self-conception helped the activists within the church, the Evangelical Church of the old-Prussian Union could not increase the number of its activists. In Berlin the number of activists made up maybe 60,000 to 80,000 persons of an overall number of parishioners of more than 3 million within an overall of more than 4 million Berliners. Especially in Berlin the affiliation faded. By the end of the 1920s still 70% of the dead in Berlin were buried accompanied by an Evangelical ceremony and 90% of the children from Evangelical couples were baptised. But only 40% of the marriages in Berlin chose an Evangelical wedding ceremony.

Whereas in 1913, before the end of the monarchy, 20,500 parishioners seceded from the old-Prussian Church, the numbers soared – during the separation of the religions and the Free State of Prussia – to 133,379 in 1919 and 163,819 in 1920. However, these secessions were still compensated by baptisands and migrants. In the early and mid-1920s the annual number of secessions amounted to about 80,000. From 1928 to 1932 annually about 50,000 parishioners seceded from the Evangelical Church of the old-Prussian Union.

In the field of church elections committed congregants formed new Kirchenparteien, which nominated candidates for the elections of the presbyteries and synods of different level. In 1919 Christian socialists founded the Covenant of Religious Socialists. As reaction to this politicisation the Evangelisch-unpolitische Liste (EuL, Evangelical unpolitical List) emerged, which ran for mandates besides the traditional Middle Party, Positive Union and another new Kirchenpartei, the Jungreformatorische Bewegung (Young Reformatory Movement). Especially in the country-side, there often were no developed Kirchenparteien, thus activist congregants formed common lists of candidates of many different opinions.

In February 1932 Protestant Nazis, above all Wilhelm Kube (presbyter at the Gethsemane Church, Berlin, and speaker of the six NSDAP parliamentarians in the Prussian State Diet) initiated the foundation of a new Kirchenpartei, the so-called Faith Movement of German Christians (German: Glaubensbewegung Deutsche Christen, DC), participating on 12–14 November 1932 for the first time in the elections for presbyters and synodals within the Evangelical Church of the old-Prussian Union and gaining about a third of the seats in presbyteries and synods.

In the inter-war years the general synod convened five times. In 1927 it decided with a narrow majority to maintain the title general superintendent instead of replacing it by the title bishop. The same general synod voted for the admittance of women as vicars. The old-Prussian Church and the Free State of Prussia formalised their relationship by the concordat of 31 May 1931. By this concordat the church was given a say in appointing professors of Protestant theology and the contents they teach in Prussia's state universities, whereas the Free State could veto the appointment of leading functionaries.

After the system of state churches had disappeared with the monarchies in the German states, the question arose, why the Protestant church bodies within Germany did not merge. Besides the smaller Protestant denominations of the Mennonites, Baptists or Methodists, which were organised crossing state borders along denominational lines, there were 29 (later 28) church bodies organised along territorial borders of German states or Prussian provinces. All those, covering the territory of former monarchies with a ruling Protestant dynasty, had been state churches until 1918 – except of the Protestant church bodies of territories annexed by Prussia in 1866. Others had been no less territorially defined Protestant minority church bodies within states of Catholic monarchs, where – before 1918 – the Roman Catholic Church played the role of state church.

In fact, a merger was permanently under discussion, but never materialised due to strong regional self-confidence and traditions as well as the denominational fragmentation into Lutheran, Calvinist and United and uniting churches. Following the Schweizerischer Evangelischer Kirchenbund (Swiss Federation of Protestant Churches) of 1920, the then 29 territorially defined German Protestant church bodies founded the Deutscher Evangelischer Kirchenbund (German Federation of Protestant Churches) in 1922, which was no new merged church, but a loose confederacy of the existing independent church bodies.

=== Under Nazi rule ===
In the period of the Third Reich the Evangelical Church of the old-Prussian Union fell into deep disunity. Most clerics, representatives and parishioners welcomed the Nazi takeover. Most Protestants suggested that the mass arrests, following the abolition of central civic rights by Paul von Hindenburg on 28 February 1933, hit the right persons. On 20 March 1933 Dachau concentration camp, the first official premise of its kind, was opened, while 150,000 hastily arrested inmates were held in hundreds of spontaneous so-called wild concentration camps, to be gradually evacuated into about 100 new official camps to be opened until the end of 1933.

On 21 March 1933 the newly elected Reichstag convened in the Evangelical Garrison Church of Potsdam, an event commemorated as the Day of Potsdam, and the locally competent Gen.-Supt. Dibelius preached. Dibelius downplayed the boycott against enterprises of Jewish proprietors and such of Gentiles of Jewish descent in an address for the US radio. Even after this clearly anti-Semitic action he repeated in his circular to the pastors of Kurmark on the occasion of Easter (16 April 1933) his anti-Jewish attitude, giving the same words as in 1928.

The Nazi Reich's government, aiming at streamlining the Protestant churches, recognised the German Christians as its means to do so. On 4 and 5 April 1933 representatives of the German Christians convened in Berlin and demanded the dismissal of all members of the executive bodies of the 28 Protestant church bodies in Germany. The German Christians demanded their ultimate merger into a uniform German Protestant Church, led according to the Nazi Führerprinzip by a Reich's Bishop (German: Reichsbischof), abolishing all democratic participation of parishioners in presbyteries and synods. The German Christians announced the appointment of a Reich's Bishop for 31 October 1933, the Reformation Day holiday. Furthermore, the German Christians demanded to purify Protestantism of all Jewish patrimony, proposing the abandonment of the Old Testament.

In a mood of an emergency through an impending Nazi takeover functionaries of the then officiating executive bodies of the 28 Protestant church bodies stole a march on the German Christians. Functionaries and activists worked hastily on negotiating between the 28 Protestant church bodies a legally indoubtable unification on 25 April 1933 three men convened, Hermann Kapler, president of the old-Prussian Evangelical Supreme Church Council– representing United Protestantism – August Marahrens, state bishop of the Evangelical Lutheran State Church of Hanover (for the Lutherans), and the Reformed Hermann-Albert Hesse, director of the preacher seminary in Wuppertal, to prepare the constitution of a united church which they called the German Evangelical Church too.

This caused the later confusion when the streamlined Reich church and the Confessing Church alike identified as being the legitimate church of that name. The Nazi government compelled the negotiators to include its representative, the former army chaplain Ludwig Müller from Königsberg, a devout German Christian. The plans were to dissolve the German Evangelical Church Confederation and the 28 church bodies and to replace them by a uniform Protestant church, to be called the German Evangelical Church (German: Deutsche Evangelische Kirche).

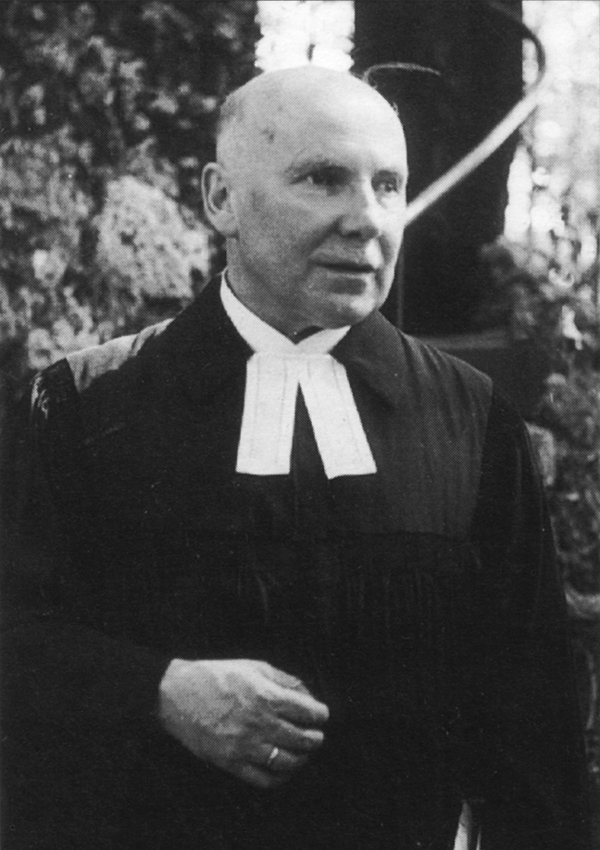
Pastor Friedrich von Bodelschwingh the Younger

On 27 May 1933 representatives of the 28 church bodies gathered in Berlin, and, against a minority voting for Ludwig Müller, elected Friedrich von Bodelschwingh, head of the Bethel Institution and member of the Evangelical Church of the old-Prussian Union, Reich's Bishop, a newly created title. The German Christians strictly opposed that election, because Bodelschwingh was not their partisan. Thus the Nazis, who were permanently breaking the law, stepped in, using the streamlined Prussian government, and declared the functionaries had exceeded their authority.

==== Abolition of religious autonomy ====
Once the Nazi government figured out that the Protestant church bodies would not be streamlined from within using the German Christians, they abolished the constitutional freedom of religion and religious organisation, declaring the unauthorised election of Bodelschwingh had created a situation contravening the constitutions of the Protestant churches, and on these grounds, on 24 June the Nazi Minister of Cultural Affairs, Bernhard Rust appointed August Jäger as Prussian State Commissioner for the Prussian ecclesiastical affairs (German: Staatskommissar für die preußischen kirchlichen Angelegenheiten).

This act clearly violated the status of the Evangelical Church of the old-Prussian Union as statutory body (German: Körperschaft des öffentlichen Rechts) and subjecting it to Jäger's orders (see Struggle of the Churches, German: Kirchenkampf). Bodelschwingh resigned as Reich's Bishop the same day. On 28 June Jäger appointed Müller as new Reich's Bishop and on 6 July as leader of the Evangelical Church of the old-Prussian Union, then with 18 million parishioners by far the biggest Protestant church body within Germany, with 41 million Protestants altogether (total population: 62 millions).

Kapler resigned as president of the Evangelical Supreme Church Council, after he had applied for retirement on 3 June, and Gen.-Supt. Wilhelm Haendler (competent for Berlin's suburbia), then presiding the March of Brandenburg Consistory retired for age reasons. Jäger furloughed Martin Albertz (superintendent of the Spandau deanery), Dibelius, Max Diestel (superintendent of the Cölln Land I deanery in the southwestern suburbs of Berlin), Emil Karow (general superintendent of Berlin inner city), and Ernst Vits (general superintendent of Lower Lusatia and the New March), thus decapitating the complete spiritual leadership of the Ecclesiastical Province of the March of Brandenburg.

Then the German Christian Dr. iur. Friedrich Werner was appointed as provisional president of the Evangelical Supreme Church Council, which he remained after his official appointment by the re-elected old-Prussian general synod until 1945. For 2 July, Werner ordered general thanksgiving services in all congregations to thank for the new imposed streamlined leadership. Many pastors protested that and held instead services of penance bearing the violation of the church constitution in mind. The pastors Gerhard Jacobi (William I Memorial Church, Berlin), Fritz (Friedrich) Müller, Martin Niemöller, Eberhard Röhricht (all the three Dahlem Congregation, Berlin) and Eitel-Friedrich von Rabenau (Apostle Paul Church, Berlin, formerly Immanuel Church (Tel Aviv-Yafo), 1912–1917) wrote a letter of protest to Jäger. Pastor Otto Grossmann (Mark's Church Südende, Berlin within Steglitz Congregation) criticised the violation of the church constitution in a speech on the radio and was subsequently arrested and interrogated (July 1933).

On 11 July German-Christian and intimidated other representatives of all the 28 Protestant church bodies in Germany declared the German Evangelical Church Confederation to be dissolved and the German Evangelical Church to be founded. On 14 July Hesse, Kapler and Marahrens presented the newly developed constitution of the German Evangelical Church, which the Nazi government declared to be valid. The same day Adolf Hitler discretionarily decreed an unconstitutional premature re-election of all presbyters and synodals in all 28 church bodies for 23 July.

The new synods of the 28 Protestant churches were to declare their dissolution as separate church bodies. Representatives of all 28 Protestant churches were to attend the newly created National Synod to confirm Müller as Reich's Bishop. Müller already now regarded himself as leader of that new organisation. He established a Spiritual Ministerium (German: Geistliches Ministerium, seated in Berlin, Marchstraße # 2 in the former premises of the German Evangelical Church Confederation), being the executive body, consisting of four persons, who were not to be elected, but whom he appointed himself.

==== Church under streamlined leadership ====
On 15 July, the Nazi government lifted state control over the Evangelical Church of the old-Prussian Union, claiming the counter-constitutional situation were healed. Since the day Müller had become leader of the Evangelical Church of the old-Prussian Union he systematically abolished the intra-organisational democracy. On 4 August Müller assumed the title State Bishop (German: Landesbischof), a title and function non-existing in the constitution of the Evangelical Church of the old-Prussian Union, and claimed hierarchical supremacy over all clerics and other employees as is usual for Catholic bishops.

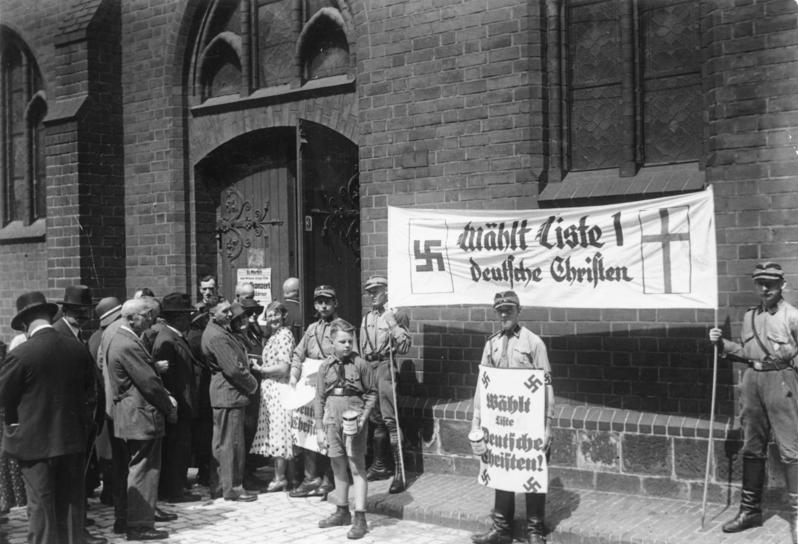
German Christians holding propaganda during the elections of presbyters and synodals on 23 July 1933 at St. Mary's Church, Berlin

In the campaign for the premature re-election of all presbyters and synodals on 23 July the Nazi Reich's government sided with the German Christians. Under the impression of the government's partiality the other existing lists of opposing candidates united to form the list Evangelical Church. The Gestapo (est. 26 April 1933) ordered the list to change its name and to replace all its election posters and flyers issued under the forbidden name. Pastor Wilhelm Harnisch (Good Samaritan Church, Berlin) hosted the opposing list in the office for the homeless of his congregation in Mirbachstraße # 24 (now Bänschstraße # 52).

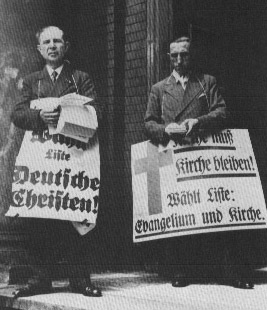
Campaigning in the election of synodals and presbyters (23 July 1933)

The Gestapo confiscated the office and the printing-press there, in order to hinder any reprint. Thus the list, which had renamed into Gospel and Church (German: Evangelium und Kirche), took refuge with the Evangelical Press Association (German: Evangelischer Preßverband), presided by Dibelius and printed new election posters in its premises in Alte Jacobstraße # 129, Berlin. The night before the election Hitler appealed on the radio to all Protestants to vote for candidates of the German Christians, while the Nazi Party declared, all its Protestant members were obliged to vote for the German Christians.

Thus the turnout in the elections was extraordinarily high, since most non-observant Protestants, who since long aligned with the Nazis, had voted. 70–80% of the newly elected presbyters and synodals of the Evangelical Church of the old-Prussian Union were candidates of the German Christians. In Berlin e.g., the candidates of Gospel and Church only won the majority in two presbyteries, in Niemöller's Dahlem Congregation, and in the congregation in Berlin-Staaken-Dorf. In 1933 among the pastors of Berlin, 160 stuck to Gospel and Church, 40 were German Christians while another 200 had taken neither side.

German Christians won a majority within the general synod of the Evangelical Church of the old-Prussian Union and within its provincial synods – except of the one of Westphalia –, as well as in many synods of other Protestant church bodies, except of the Evangelical Lutheran Church in Bavaria right of the river Rhine, the Evangelical Lutheran State Church of Hanover, and the Lutheran Evangelical State Church in Württemberg, which the opposition thus regarded as uncorrupted intact churches, as opposed to the other than so-called destroyed churches.

On 24 August 1933 the new synodals convened for a March of Brandenburg provincial synod. They elected a new provincial church council with 8 seats for the German Christians and two for Detlev von Arnim-Kröchlendorff, an esquire owning a manor in Kröchlendorff (a part of today's Nordwestuckermark), and Gerhard Jacobi (both Gospel and Church). Then the German Christian majority of 113 synodals over 37 nays decided to appeal to the general synod to introduce the so-called Aryan paragraph (German: Arierparagraph) as church law, thus demanding that employees of the Evangelical Church of the old-Prussian Union – being all baptised Protestant church members -, who had grandparents, who were enrolled as Jews, or who were married with such persons, were all to be fired. Gerhard Jacobi led the opposing provincial synodals. Other provincial synods demanded the Aryan paragraph too.

On 7 April 1933 the Nazi Reich's government had introduced an equivalent law for all state officials and employees. By introducing the Nazi racist attitudes into the Evangelical Church of the old-Prussian Union, the approving synodals betrayed the Christian sacrament of baptism, according to which this act makes a person a Christian, superseding any other faith, which oneself may have been observing before and knowing nothing about any racial affinity as a prerequisite of being a Christian, let alone one's grandparents' religious affiliation being an obstacle to being Christian.

Rudolf Bultmann and Hans von Soden, professors of Protestant theology at the Philip's University in Marburg upon Lahn, wrote in their assessment in 1933, that the Aryan paragraph contradicts the Protestant confession of everybody's right to perform her or his faith freely. "The Gospel is to be universally preached to all peoples and races and makes all baptised persons insegregable brethren to each other. Therefore, unequal rights, due to national or racial arguments, are inacceptable as well as any segregation."

On 5 and 6 September the same year the General Synod of the whole Evangelical Church of the old-Prussian Union convened in the building of the former Prussian State Council (Leipziger Straße No. 3, now seat of the Federal Council (Germany)). Also here the German Christians used their new majority, thus this General Synod became known among the opponents as the Brown Synod, for brown being the colour of the Nazi party.

When on 5 September Jakob Emil Karl Koch, then praeses of the unadulterated Westphalian provincial synod, tried to bring forward the arguments of the opposition against the Aryan paragraph and the abolition of synodal and presbyterial democracy, the majority of German Christian synodals shouted him down. The German Christians abused the general synod as a mere acclamation, like a Nazi party convention. Koch and his partisans left the synod. The majority of German Christians thus voted in the Aryan paragraph for all the Evangelical Church of the old-Prussian Union. On 5 September the brown synodals passed the retroactive church law, which only established the function and title of bishop. The same law renamed the ecclesiastical provinces into bishoprics (German: Bistum/Bistümer, sg./pl.), each led – according to the new law of 6 September – by a provincial bishop (German: Provinzialbischof) replacing the prior general superintendents.

By enabling the dismissal of all Protestants of Jewish descent from jobs with the Evangelical Church of the old-Prussian Union, the official church bodies accepted the Nazi racist doctrine of anti-Semitism. This breach with Christian principles within the range of the church was unacceptable to many church members. Nevertheless, pursuing Martin Luther's Doctrine of the two kingdoms (God rules within the world: Directly within the church and in the state by means of the secular government) many church members could not see any basis, how a Protestant church body could interfere with the anti-Semitism performed in the state sphere, since in its self-conception the church body was a religious, not a political organisation. Only few parishioners and clergy, mostly of Reformed tradition, followed John Calvin's doctrine of the Kingdom of Christ within the church and the world.

Among them were Karl Barth and Dietrich Bonhoeffer, who demanded the church bodies to oppose the abolition of democracy and the unlawfulness in the general political sphere. Especially pastors in the countryside – often younger men, since the traditional pastoral career ladder started in a village parish – were outraged about this development. Herbert Goltzen, Eugen Weschke, and Günter Jacob, three pastors from Lower Lusatia, regarded the introduction of the Aryan paragraph as the violation of the confession. In late summer 1933 Jacob, pastor in Noßdorf (a part of today's Forst in Lusatia/Baršć), developed the central theses, which became the self-commitment of the opponents.

==== Emergency Covenant of Pastors ====
On 11 September 1933 Gerhard Jacobi gathered c. 60 opposing pastors, who clearly saw the breach of Christian and Protestant principles. Weschke and Günter Jacob proposed to found the Emergency Covenant of Pastors (German: Pfarrernotbund), and so they did, electing Pastor Niemöller their president. On the basis of the theses of Günter Jacob its members concluded that a schism was a matter of fact, a new Protestant church was to be established, since the official organisation was anti-Christian, heretical and therefore illegitimate. Each pastor joining the Covenant – until the end of September 1933 2,036 out of a total of 18,842 Protestant pastors in Germany acceded – had to sign that he rejected the Aryan paragraph.

In 1934 the Covenant counted 7,036 members, after 1935 the number sank to 4,952, among them 374 retired pastors, 529 auxiliary preachers and 116 candidates. First the pastors of Berlin, affiliated with the Covenant, met biweekly in Gerhard Jacobi's private apartment. From 1935 on they convened in the premises of the Young Men's Christian Association (YMCA, German: Christlicher Verein Junger Männer) in Wilhelmstraße No. 24 in Berlin-Kreuzberg, opposite to the headquarters of Heinrich Himmler's Sicherheitsdienst (in 1939 integrated into the Reichssicherheitshauptamt, RSHA) in Wilhelmstraße # 102. In 1941 the Gestapo closed the YMCA house.

==== Abolition of synods ====
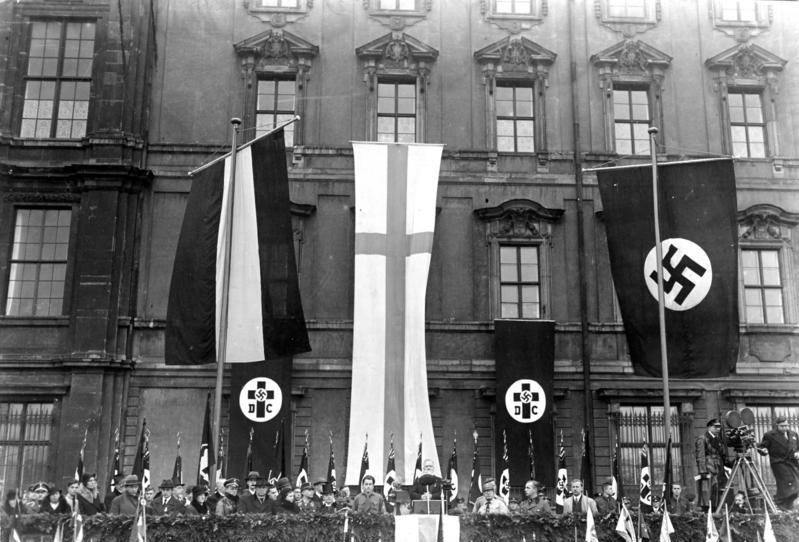
Provincial Bishop Joachim Hossenfelder speaking on the occasion of Luther Day (19 November 1933) in front of the Berlin City Palace

On 18 September 1933 Werner was appointed praeses of the old-Prussian general synod, thus becoming president of the church senate. In September Ludwig Müller appointed Joachim Hossenfelder, Reichsfuhrer of the German Christians, as provincial bishop of Brandenburg (resigned in November after the éclat in the Sportpalast, see below), while the then furloughed Karow was newly appointed as provincial bishop of Berlin. Thus the Ecclesiastical Province of the March of Brandenburg, which included Berlin, had two bishops. Karow, being no German Christian, resigned in early 1934 in protest against Ludwig Müller.

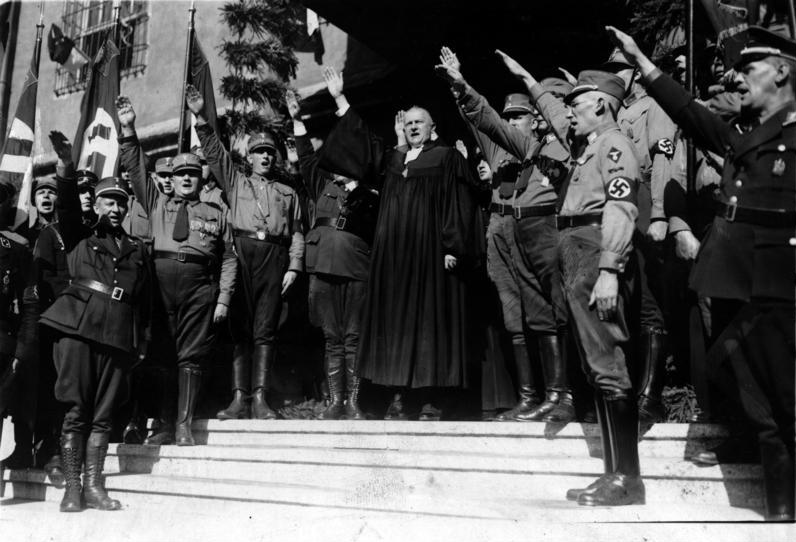
The old-Prussian State Bishop Ludwig Müller before his acclamation as Reich's Bishop by the National Synod in Wittenberg

On 27 September the pan-German First National Synod convened in the highly symbolic city of Wittenberg, where the Protestant Reformer Martin Luther nailed the Ninety-five Theses to the door of the church in 1517. The synodals were not elected by the parishioners, but two-thirds were delegated by the church leaders, now called bishops, of the 28 Protestant church bodies, including the three intact ones, and one third were emissaries of Müller's Spiritual Ministerium.

Only such synodals were admitted, who would "uncompromisingly stand up any time for the National Socialist state". The national synod confirmed Müller as Reich's Bishop. The synodals of the national synod decided to waive their right to legislate in church matters and empowered Müller's Spiritual Ministerium to act as he wished. Furthermore, the national synod usurped the power in the 28 Protestant church bodies and provided the new so-called bishops of the 28 Protestant church bodies with hierarchical supremacy over all clergy and laymen within their church organisation. The national synod abolished future election for the synods of the 28 Protestant church bodies. Henceforth synodals had to replace two-thirds of the outgoing synodals by co-optation, the remaining third was to be appointed by the respective bishop.

==== Attempted merger into the Reich Church ====
The general synod (German: Generalsynode) of the Evangelical Church of the old-Prussian Union decided with the majority of the German Christian synodals to merge the church in the German Evangelical Church as of 1 March 1934 on. The synods of 25 other Protestant church bodies decided the same until the end of 1933. Only the synods of the Evangelical Lutheran Church in Bavaria right of the river Rhine, led by Hans Meiser, and the Evangelical State Church in Württemberg, presided by Theophil Wurm, opposed and decided not to merge.

This made also the Evangelical Lutheran State Church of Hanover (one of the few Protestant churches in Germany using the title of bishop already since the 1920s, thus prior to the Nazi era), with State Bishop August Marahrens, change its mind. But the Evangelical Lutheran State Church of Hanover hesitated to openly confront the Nazi Reich's government, still searching for an understanding even after 1934.

Niemöller, Rabenau and Kurt Scharf (Congregation in Sachsenhausen (Oranienburg)) circulated an appeal, calling the pastors up not to fill in the forms, meant to prove their Aryan descent, distributed by the Evangelical Supreme Church Council. Thus its president Werner furloughed the three on 9 November. For more and more purposes Germans had to prove their so-called Aryan descent, which usually was confirmed by copies from the baptismal registers of the churches, certifying that all four grandparents had been baptised. Some pastors soon understood, that people lacking four baptised grandparents are helped a lot – and later even rescued their lives – if they were certified to be Aryan by false copies from the baptismal registers. Pastor Paul Braune (Lobetal, a part of today's Bernau bei Berlin) issued a memorandum, secretly handed out to pastors of confidence, how to falsify the best. But the majority of pastors in their legalist attitude would not issue false copies.

On 13 November 20,000 German Christians convened in the Berlin Sportpalast for a general meeting. Dr. Reinhold Krause, then president of the Greater Berlin section of the German Christians, held a speech, defaming the Old Testament for its alleged "Jewish morality of rewards" (German: jüdische Lohnmoral), and demanding the cleansing of the New Testament from the "scapegoat mentality and theology of inferiority" (German: Sündenbock- und Minderwertigkeitstheologie des Rabbiners Paulus), whose emergence Krause attributed to the Rabbi (Sha'ul) Paul of Tarsos. Through this speech the German Christians showed their true colours and this opened the eyes of many sympathisers of the German Christians. On 22 November, the Emergency Covenant of Pastors, led by Niemöller, issued a declaration about the heretic belief of the German Christians. On 29 November the Covenant gathered 170 members in Berlin-Dahlem in order to call up Ludwig Müller to resign so that the Evangelical Church of the old-Prussian Union could return into a constitutional condition.

A wave of protest flooded over the German Christians, which ultimately initiated the decline of that movement. On 25 November the complete Bavarian section of the German Christians declared its secession. So Krause was dismissed from his functions with the German Christians and the Evangelical Church of the old-Prussian Union. Krause's dismissal again made the radical Thuringian subsection declare its secession by the end of November. This pushed the complete Faith Movement into crisis so that its Reich's leader Joachim Hossenfelder had to resign on 20 December 1933. The different regional sections then split and united and resplit into half a dozen of movements, entering into a tiresome self-deprecation. Many presbyters of German Christian alignment retired, tired from disputing. So until 1937/1938 many presbyteries in Berlin congregations lost their German Christian majority by mere absenteeism. However the German Christian functionaries on the higher levels mostly remained aboard.

On 4 January 1934 Ludwig Müller, claiming to have by his title as Reich's Bishop legislative power for all Protestant church bodies in Germany, issued the so-called muzzle decree, which forbade any debate about the struggle of the churches within the rooms, bodies and media of the church. The Emergency Covenant of Pastors answered this decree by a declaration read by opposing pastors from their pulpits on 7 and 14 January. Müller then prompted the arrestment or disciplinary procedures against about 60 pastors alone in Berlin, who had been denounced by spies or congregants of German Christian affiliation. The Gestapo tapped Niemöller's phone and thus learned about his and Walter Künneth's plan to personally plea Hitler for a dismissal of Ludwig Müller. The Gestapo – playing divide et impera – publicised their intention as a conspiracy and so the Lutheran church leaders Marahrens, Meiser, and Wurm distanced themselves from Niemöller on 26 January.

The same day Ludwig Müller decreed the Führerprinzip, a hierarchy of subordination to command, within the Evangelical Church of the old-Prussian Union. Thus having usurped the power the German Christian Müller forbade his unwelcome competitor as church leader, the German Christian Werner, to discharge his duties as praeses of the Church Senate and president of the Evangelical Supreme Church Council. Werner then sued Müller at the Landgericht I in Berlin. The verdict would have major consequences for the Evangelical Church of the old-Prussian Union. Also opponents, legally consulted by Judge Günther (judge at the Landgericht court), Horst Holstein, Friedrich Justus Perels, and Friedrich Weißler, covered Ludwig Müller and his willing subordinates with a wave of litigations in the ordinary courts in order to reach verdicts on his arbitrary anticonstitutional measures. Since Müller had acted without legal basis the courts usually proved the litigants to be right.

On 3 February Müller decreed another ordinance to send functionaries against their will into early retirement. Müller thus further cleansed the staff in the consistories, the Evangelical Supreme Church Council and the deaneries from opponents. On 1 March Müller pensioned Niemöller off, the latter and his Dahlem Congregation simply ignored that.

Furthermore, Müller degraded the legislative provincial synods and the executive provincial church councils into mere advisory boards. Müller appointed Paul Walzer, formerly county commissioner in the Free City of Danzig, as president of the March of Brandenburg provincial consistory. In the beginning of 1936 Supreme Consistorial Councillor Georg Rapmund, member of the Evangelical Supreme Church Council, succeeded Walzer as consistorial president. After Rapmund's death Supreme Consistorial Councillor Ewald Siebert followed him.

In a series of provincial synods the opposition assumed shape. On 3/4 January 1934 Karl Barth presided a synod in Wuppertal-Barmen for Reformed parishioners within the Evangelical Church of the old-Prussian Union; on 18/19 February a so-called free synod convened the Rhenish opponents and the Westphalians met at the first Westphalian Synod of Confession on 16 March. On 7 March the so-called free synod for the Ecclesiastical Province of the March of Brandenburg, much influenced by the Reformed pastor Supt. Martin Albertz, elected its first provincial brethren council, comprising Supt. Albertz, Arnim-Kröchlendorff, Wilhelm von Arnim-Lützow, sculpturist Wilhelm Groß, Walter Häfele, Justizrat Willy Hahn, Oberstudienrat Georg Lindner, H. Michael, Willy Praetorius, Rabenau, Scharf, Regierunsgrat Kurt Siehe, and Heinrich Vogel, presided by Gerhard Jacobi.

The Gestapo shut down one office of the provincial brethren council after the other. Werner Zillich and Max Moelter were the executive directors, further collaborators were Elisabeth Möhring (sister of the opposing pastor Gottfried Möhring at St. Catharine's Church in Brandenburg upon Havel) and Senta Maria Klatt (Congregation of St. John's Church, Berlin-Moabit). The Gestapo summoned her more than 40 times and tried to intimidate her, confronting her with the fact that she, being partly of Jewish descent, would have to realise the worst possible treatment in jail. In the eleven deaneries covering Greater Berlin, six were led by superintendents, who joined the Emergency Covenant of Pastors.

==== German Christian schism ====
Some functionaries and laymen in the Evangelical Church of the old-Prussian Union opposed the unification of the 28 Protestant church bodies, but many more agreed, but they wanted it under the preservation of the true Protestant faith, not imposed by Nazi partisans. In reaction to the convention and claims of the German Christians non-Nazi Protestants met in Barmen from 29 to 31 May 1934. On 29 May those coming from congregations within the Evangelical Church of the old-Prussian Union held a separate meeting, their later on so-called first old-Prussian Synod of Confession (German: erste altpreußische Landes-Bekenntnissynode, also Barmen Synod). The old-Prussian synodals elected the Brethren Council of the Evangelical Church of the old-Prussian Union, chaired by the Westphalian synodal praeses Jakob Emil Karl Koch, then titled Praeses of the Brethren Council. Further members were Gerhard Jacobi, Niemöller and Fritz Müller.

In the convention, following suit on 30 and 31 May, the participants from all 28 Protestant church bodies in Germany – including the old-Prussian synodals – declared Protestantism were based on the complete Holy Scripture, the Old and the New Covenant. The participants declared this basis to be binding for any Protestant Church deserving that name and confessed their allegiance to this basis (see Barmen Theological Declaration). Henceforth the movement of all Protestant denominations, opposing Nazi adulteration of Protestantism and Nazi intrusion into Protestant church affairs, was called the Confessing Church (German: Bekennende Kirche, BK), their partisans Confessing Christians, as opposed to German Christians. Later this convention in Barmen used to be called the first Reich's Synod of Confession (German: erste Reichsbekenntnissynode).

Presbyteries with German Christian majorities often banned Confessing Christians from using church property and even entering the church buildings. Many church employees, who opposed, were dismissed. Especially among the many rural Pietists in the Ecclesiastical Province of Pomerania the opposition found considerable support. While the German Christians, holding the majority in most official church bodies, lost many supporters, the Confessing Christians, comprising many authentical persuasive activists, still remained a minority but increased their number. As compared to the vast majority of indifferent, non-observing Protestants, both movements were marginal.

One pre-1918 tradition of non-ecclesiastical influence within church structures had made it into the new constitution of the Evangelical Church of the old-Prussian Union of 1922. Many of the churches, which had been founded before the 19th century, had a patron holding the ius patronatus, meaning that either the owner of a manor estate (in the countryside) or a political municipality or city was in charge of maintaining the church buildings and paying the pastor. No pastor could be appointed without the consent of the patron (advowson). This became a curse and a blessing during the Nazi period. While all political entities were Nazi-streamlined they abused the patronage to appoint Nazi-submissive pastors on the occasion of a vacancy. Also estate owners sometimes sided with the Nazis. But more estate owners were conservative and thus rather backed the opposition in the Evangelical Church of the old-Prussian Union. So the congregations under their patronage could often keep or appoint anew a pastor of the intra-church opposition.

On 9 August 1934 the Second National Synod, with all synodals again admitted by the Spiritual Ministerium, severed the uniformation of the formerly independent Protestant church bodies, disenfranchising their respective synods to decide in internal church matters. These pretensions increased the criticism among church members within the streamlined church bodies. On 23 September 1934 Ludwig Müller was inaugurated in a church ceremony as Reich's Bishop.

The Lutheran church bodies of Bavaria right of the river Rhine and Württemberg again refused to merge in September 1934. The imprisonment of their leaders, Bishop Meiser and Bishop Wurm, evoked public protests of congregants in Bavaria right of the river Rhine and Württemberg. Thus the Nazi Reich's government saw, that the German Christians aroused more and more unrest among Protestants, rather driving people into opposition to the government, than domesticating Protestantism as useful beadle for the Nazi reign. A breakthrough was the verdict of 20 November 1934. The court Landgericht I in Berlin decided that all decisions, taken by Müller since he decreed the Führerprinzip within the Evangelical Church of the old-Prussian Union on 26 January, the same year, were to be reversed. Thus the Evangelical Church of the old-Prussian Union reconstituted on 20 November 1934. But the prior dismissals of opponents and impositions of loyal German Christians in many church functions were not reversed. Werner regained his authority as president of the Evangelical Supreme Church Council.

==== Old-Prussian confessing church ====
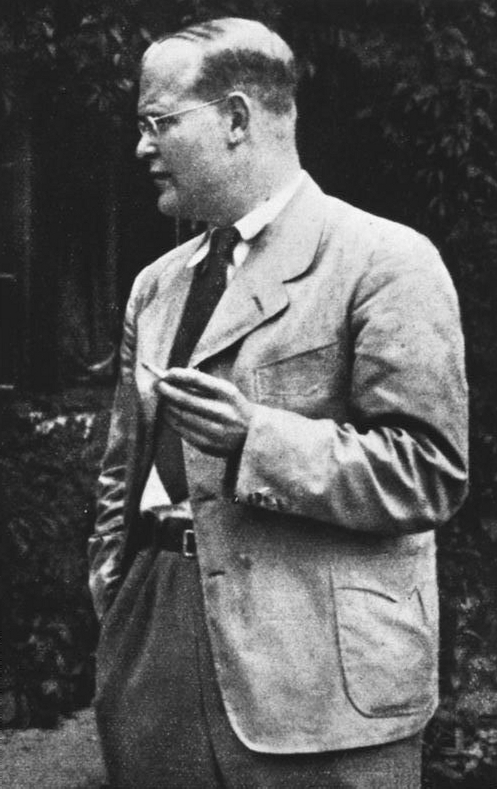
Bonhoeffer – among others – lecturer at the Finkenwalde preacher seminary, here at its later venue in Sigurdshof, August 1939

In autumn 1934 the Gestapo ordered the closure of the existing free preachers' seminaries, whose attendance formed part of the obligatory theological education of a pastor. The existing Reformed seminary in Wuppertal-Elberfeld, led by Hesse, resisted its closure and was accepted by the Confessing Church, which opened more preachers' seminaries (German: Predigerseminar) of its own, such as the seminary in Bielefeld-Sieker (led by Otto Schmitz), Bloestau (East Prussia) and Jordan in the New March (both led by Hans Iwand 1935–1937), Naumburg am Queis (Gerhard Gloege), Stettin-Finkenwalde, later relocated to Groß Schlönwitz and then to Sigurdshof (forcibly closed in 1940, led by Dietrich Bonhoeffer). These activities completely depended on donations. In 1937 the Gestapo closed the seminaries in the east. Iwand, on whom in 1936 the Gestapo had inflicted the nationwide prohibition to speak in the public, reopened a seminary in Dortmund in January 1938. This earned him an imprisonment of four-month in the same year.

On 11 October 1934 the Confessing Church established in Achenbachstraße No. 3, Berlin, its own office for the examination of pastors and other church employees, since the official church body discriminated against candidates of Nazi opposing opinion. Until 1945 3,300 theologists graduated at this office. Among their examiners were originally professors of the Frederick William University of Berlin, who refrained from examining after their employer, the Nazi government, threatened to dismiss them in 1935. After this there were only ecclesiastical examinators, such as Walter Delius (Berlin-Friedrichshagen), Elisabeth Grauer, Günther Harder (Fehrbellin), Günter Jacob, Fritz Müller, Wilhelm Niesel (auxiliary preacher Wuppertal-Elberfeld), Susanne Niesel-Pfannschmidt, Barbara Thiele, Bruno Violet (Friedrichswerder Church, Berlin), and Johannes Zippel (Steglitz Congregation, Berlin). On 1 December 1935 the Confessing Church opened its own Kirchliche Hochschule (KiHo, ecclesiastical college), seated in Berlin-Dahlem and Wuppertal-Elberfeld. The Gestapo forbade the opening ceremony in Dahlem, thus Supt. Albertz spontaneously celebrated it in St. Nicholas' Church Spandau, Berlin. On 4 December, the Gestapo closed the KiHo altogether, thus the teaching and learning continued underground at changing locations. Among the teachers were Supt. Albertz, Hans Asmussen, Joseph Chambon, Franz Hildebrandt, Niesel, Edo Osterloh, Heinrich Vogel, and Johannes Wolff.

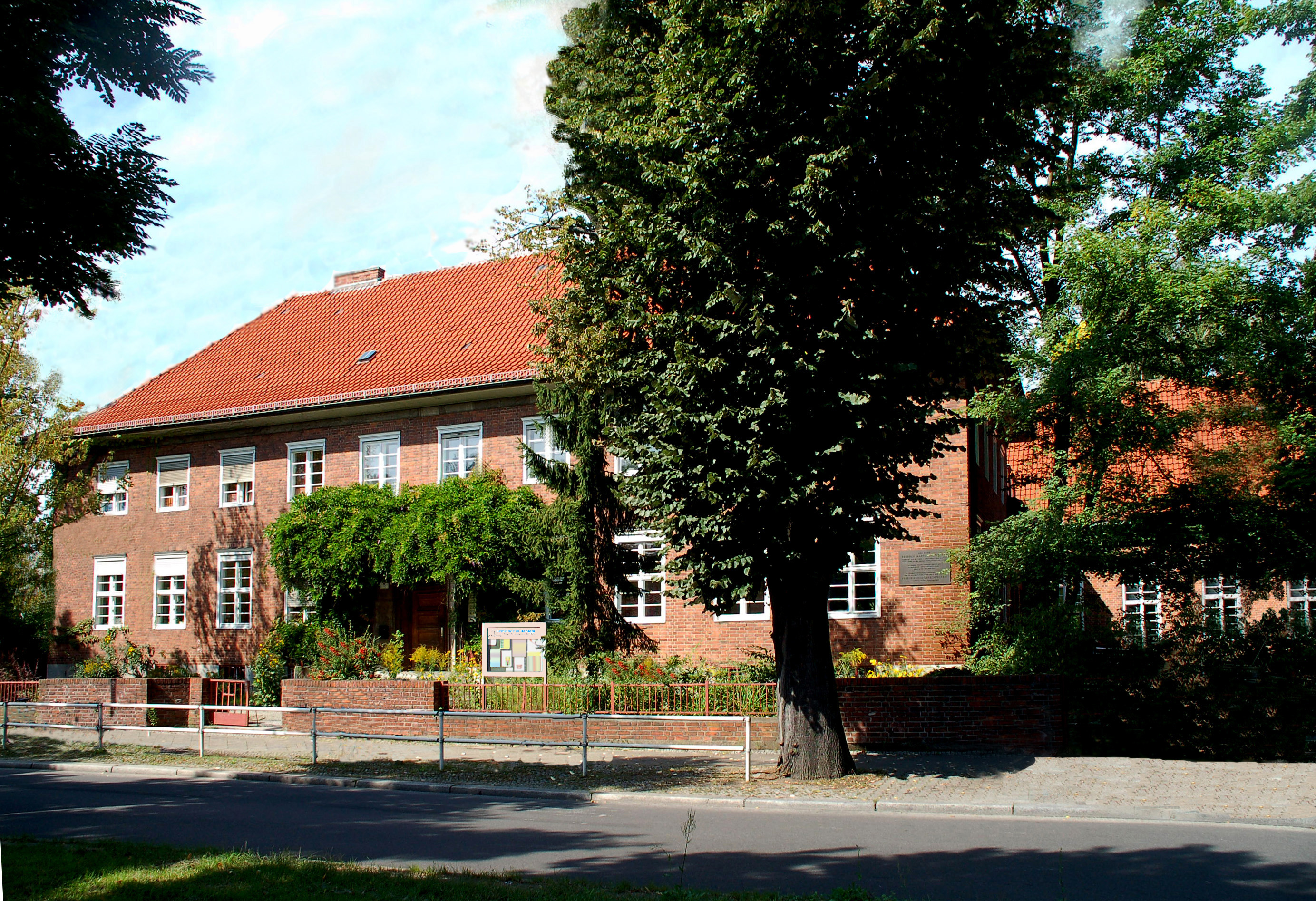
Fellowship hall of the Evangelical Dahlem Congregation, Berlin

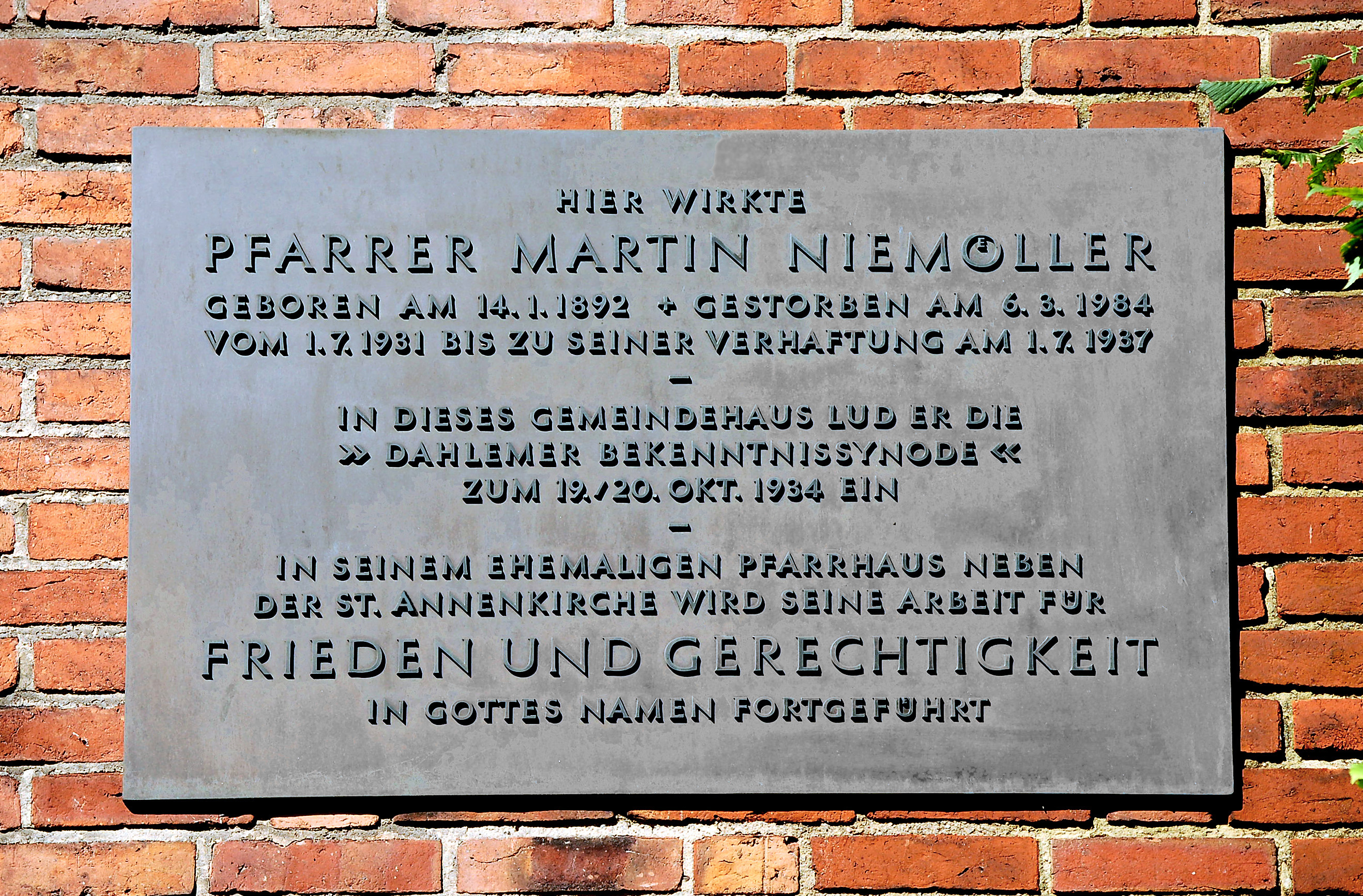
Plaque commemorating the second Reich's Synod of Confession on the outside wall of the fellowship hall

Meanwhile, Niemöller and other Confessing Church activists organised the second Reich's Synod of Confession in Berlin's Dahlem Congregation on 19 and 20 October 1934. The synodals elected by all confessing congregations and the congregations of the intact churches decided to found an independent German Evangelical Church. Since the confessing congregations would have to contravene the laws as interpreted by the official church bodies, the synod developed an emergency law of its own. For the destroyed church of the old-Prussian Union they provided for each congregation, taken over by a German Christian majority a so-called brethren council (German: Bruderrat) as provisional presbytery, and a Confessing congregation assembly (German: Bekenntnisgemeindeversammlung) to parallelise the congregants' representation. The Confessing congregations of each deanery formed a Confessing deanery synod (German: Kreis-Bekenntnissynode), electing a deanery brethren council (German: Kreis-Bruderrat).

If the superintendent of a deanery clung to the Confessing Church, he was accepted, otherwise a deanery pastor (German: Kreispfarrer) was elected from the midst of the Confessing pastors in the deanery. Confessing congregants elected synodals for a Confessing provincial synod as well as Confessing State synod (German: Provinzial-, resp. Landes-Bekenntnissynode), who again elected a provincial brethren council or the state brethren council of the Evangelical Church of the old-Prussian Union (colloquially old-Prussian brethren council), and a council of the Confessing ecclesiastical province (German: Rat der Bekennenden Kirche of the respective ecclesiastical province) or the council of the Confessing Church of the old-Prussian Union, the respective administrative bodies.

Any obedience to the official bodies of the destroyed church of the old-Prussian Union was to be rejected. The Confessing Christians integrated the existing bodies of the opposition – such as the brethren councils of the Emergency Covenant of Pastors, and the independent synods (est. starting in January 1934) -, or established the described parallel structures anew all over the area of the Evangelical Church of the old-Prussian Union in November 1934.

The rivalling German Evangelical Church of the Confessing Church movement constituted in Dahlem. The synodals elected a Reich's Brethren Council, which elected from its midst the executive Council of the German Evangelical Church, consisting of six.

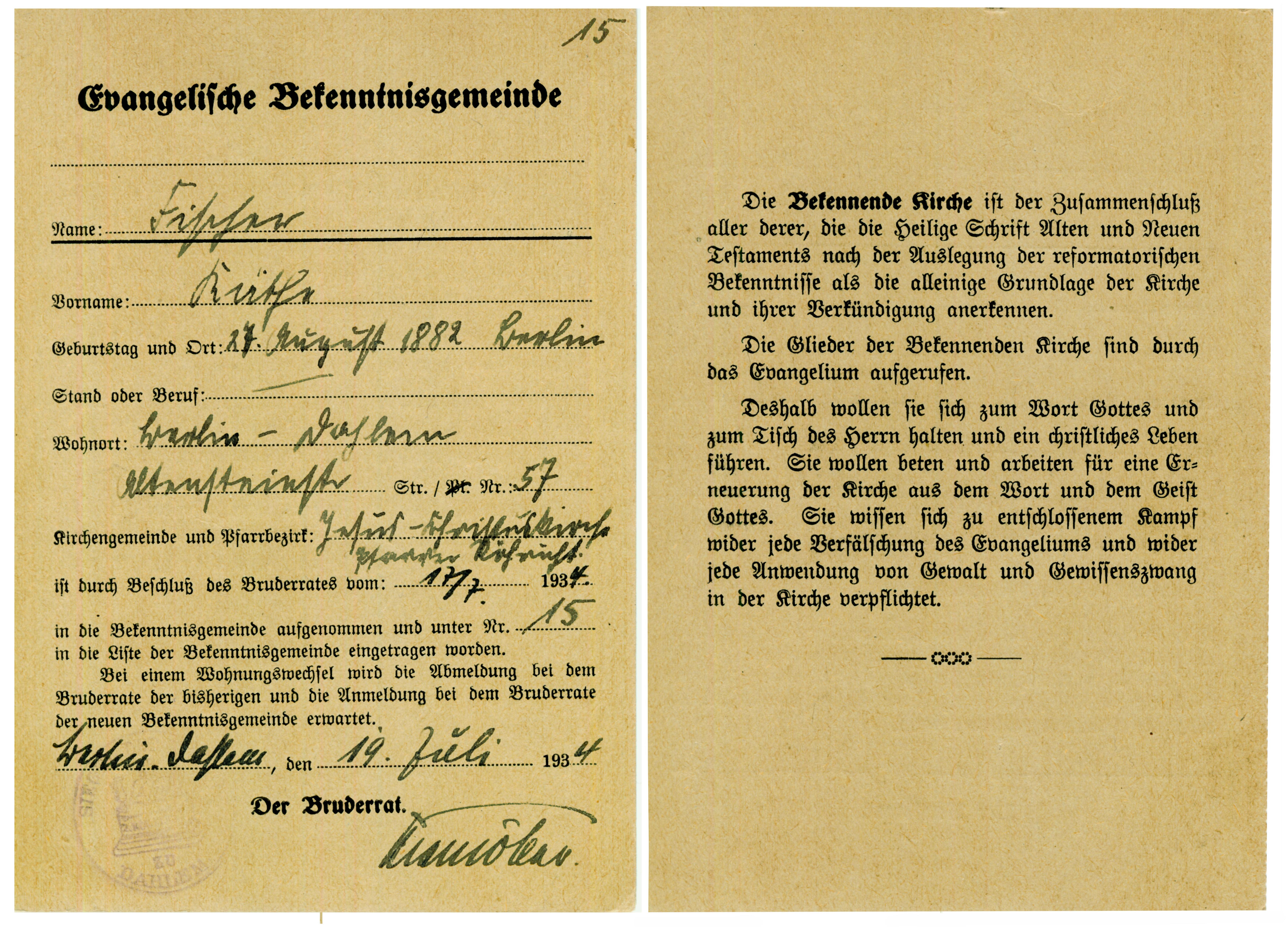
A so-called Red Card, designating one's affiliation with the Confessing Church in order to access any Confessing Church event, since all its events were banned by the Nazi government to be open for the public

In Berlin Confessing Christians celebrated the constitution of their church on the occasion of the Reformation Day (31 October 1934). The Gestapo forbade them any public event, thus the festivities had to take place in closed rooms with bidden guests only. All the participants had to carry a so-called red card, identifying them as proponents of the Confessing Church. However, 30,000 convened in different convention centres in the city and Niemöller, Peter Petersen (Lichterfelde) and Adolf Kurtz (Twelve Apostles Church) – among others – held speeches. On 7 December the Gestapo forbade the Confessing Church to rent any location, in order to prevent future events like that. The Nazi government then forbade any mentioning of the Kirchenkampf in which media whatsoever.

Hitler was informed about the proceedings in Dahlem and invited the leaders of the three Lutheran intact churches, Marahrens, Meiser and Wurm. He recognised them as legitimate leaders, but expressed that he would not accept the Reich's Brethren Council. This was meant to wedge the Confessing Church along the lines of the uncompromising Confessing Christians, around Niemöller from Dahlem, therefore nicknamed the Dahlemites (German: Dahlemiten), and the more moderate Lutheran intact churches and many opposing functionaries and clergy in the destroyed churches, which had not yet been dismissed.

For the time being the Confessing Christians found a compromise and appointed – on 22 November – the so-called first Preliminary Church Executive (German: Vorläufige Leitung der Deutschen Evangelischen Kirche, 1. VKL), consisting of Thomas Breit, Wilhelm Flor, Paul Humburg, Koch, and Marahrens. The executive was meant to only represent the Reich's Brethren Council to the outside. But soon Barth, Hesse, Karl Immanuel Immer and Niemöller found the first Preliminary Church Executive to be too compromising so that these Dahlemites resigned from the Reich's Brethren Council.

Between end of 1934 and March 1937 the central office of the Preliminary Church Executive was located in the Burckhardt-Haus of the school for social workers (German: Lehrhaus für Gemeindehelferinnen der ev. Kirche) of the Evangelical Church of the old-Prussian Union in Berlin's then # 27, Friedbergstraße (now Rudeloffstraße).

With the verdict of the Landgericht I, and this turn in Hitler's policy Jäger resigned from his office as state commissioner. Müller refused to resign as Reich's bishop but had to unwind all measures taken to forcefully unite the church bodies. So besides the Confessing Church of the old-Prussian Union, founded in October 1934 also the official, German Christian-dominated Evangelical Church of the old-Prussian Union reconstituted in November.

The second old-Prussian Synod of Confession (also old-Prussian Dahlem Synod) convened in Berlin-Dahlem on 4 and 5 March 1935. The synodals decided that the Confessing Church of the old-Prussian Union should unite with the destroyed official Church of the old-Prussian Union. The synodals further adopted a declaration about the Nazi racist doctrine. The same month the declaration was read in all confessing congregations, that the Nazi racist doctrine, claiming there were a Jewish and an Aryan race, was pure mysticism. In reaction to that the Nazi government arrested 700 pastors, who had read this declaration from their pulpits. The official church ordered to read a declaration demanding the parishioners' obedience to the Nazi government. On Sunday Judica (7 April 1935) Confessing pastors held rogations for the imprisoned Confessing Christians. From then on every Tuesday the brethren councils issued updated lists with the names of the imprisoned.

Since the 28 Protestant church bodies in Germany levied contributions from their parishioners by a surcharge on the income tax, collected and then transferred by the state tax offices, the official church bodies denied the confessing congregations their share in the contributions. Each congregation had its own budget and the official church authorities transferred the respective share in the revenues to the legitimate presbytery of each congregations, be it governed by German Christians or Confessing Christians.

The Nazi Reich's government now intended to drain this financial influx by a new decree with the euphemising title Law on the Wealth Formation within the Evangelical Church Bodies (11 March 1935). Thus the Nazi Reich's government subjected the Evangelical Church of the old-Prussian Union to governmental financial control. All budgets and remittances were to be confirmed by state comptrollers. On 11 April an ordinance ordered that salaries were only to be remitted to orderly appointed employees and all future appointments of whomsoever, would only take effect with the consent of the financial departments.

Consistorial Councillor von Arnim-Kröchlendorff, a proponent of the Confessing Church, was appointed leader of the financial department for Berlin. He turned out to ignore the rules and to largely use his scope of discretion. But many other financial departments were chaired by sharp Nazi officials. Thus Confessing congregations outside of Berlin built up a new network of escrow accounts. It became especially difficult to defray the salaries of the officially non-confirmed employees. Confessing Christians of laity and Covenant pastors, still undisputedly receiving a full salary from the official church, agreed to substantial contributions to maintain the Confessing Church.

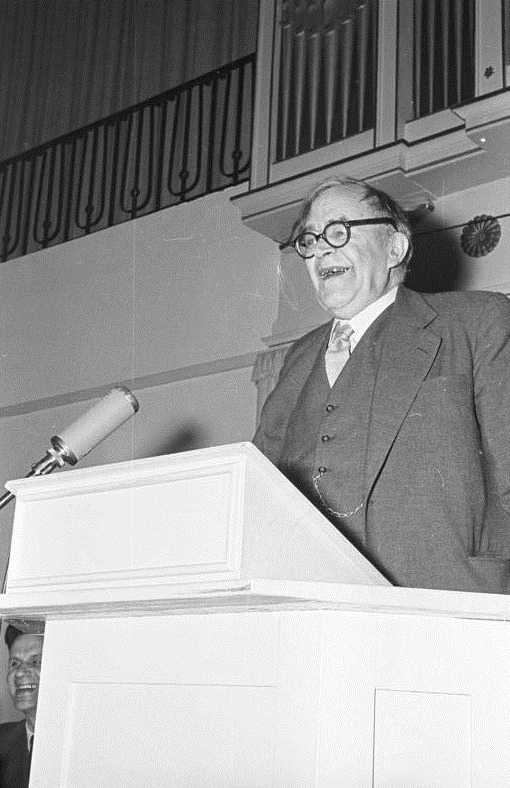
Prof. Karl Barth in Wuppertal (1 March 1958)

On 4 to 6 June 1935, two weeks after the Nuremberg Laws had been decreed, the synodals of the Confessing Church convened in Augsburg for the third Reich's Synod of Confession. Disputes between the intact churches of Bavaria right of the river Rhine and Württemberg with the first preliminary church executive could be settled. So Niemöller, Hesse and Immer returned into the Reich's Brethren Council. Prof. Barth, refusing to sign the newly introduced oath of all professors to Hitler, had been dismissed from his chair at the Rhenish Frederick William's University of Bonn and remigrated to Switzerland, where he was appointed professor at the University of Basel. But the synodals did not adopt a declaration, prepared by Supt. Albertz, condemning the Nuremberg Laws. Wurm was elected speaker of the Confessing Church.

Right after this synod the Nazi Reich's government intensified its fight against the Confessing Church. Since the orderly courts often approved litigations against German Christian measurements, because they usually lacked any legal basis, on 26 June 1935 the Nazi government passed a law, which would ban all suits about church questions from being decided by orderly jurisdiction.

Instead – as was typical for the Nazi government – they established a new parallel authority, the Decision-Taking Office for Affairs of the Evangelical Church (German: Beschlußstelle in Angelegenheiten der Evangelischen Kirche). Thus the Nazi government cut off the Confessing Church from appealing to courts. All lawsuits on church matters, some still pending since 1 May 1933, were to be decided by the Decision-Taking Office. Orderly courts could not overrule its decisions. With this power the Decision-Taking Office blackmailed the Confessing Church to compromise. The Decision-Taking Office refrained from acting as long as the Confessing Church co-operated. In fact the Decision-Taking Office only acted up after the compromises failed in 1937. In the following years of compromising Hermann Ehlers became a legal advisor of the old-Prussian brethren council, until he was arrested from June to July 1937, which made him quit his collaboration.

==== Government response to the schism ====
On 16 July 1935 Hanns Kerrl was appointed Reich's minister for ecclesiastical affairs, a newly created department. He started negotiations to find a compromise. Therefore, he dropped the extreme German Christians and tried to win moderate Confessing Christians and respected neutrals. On 24 September 1935, a new law empowered Kerrl to legislate by way of ordinances within the Protestant church bodies, circumventing any synodal autonomy.

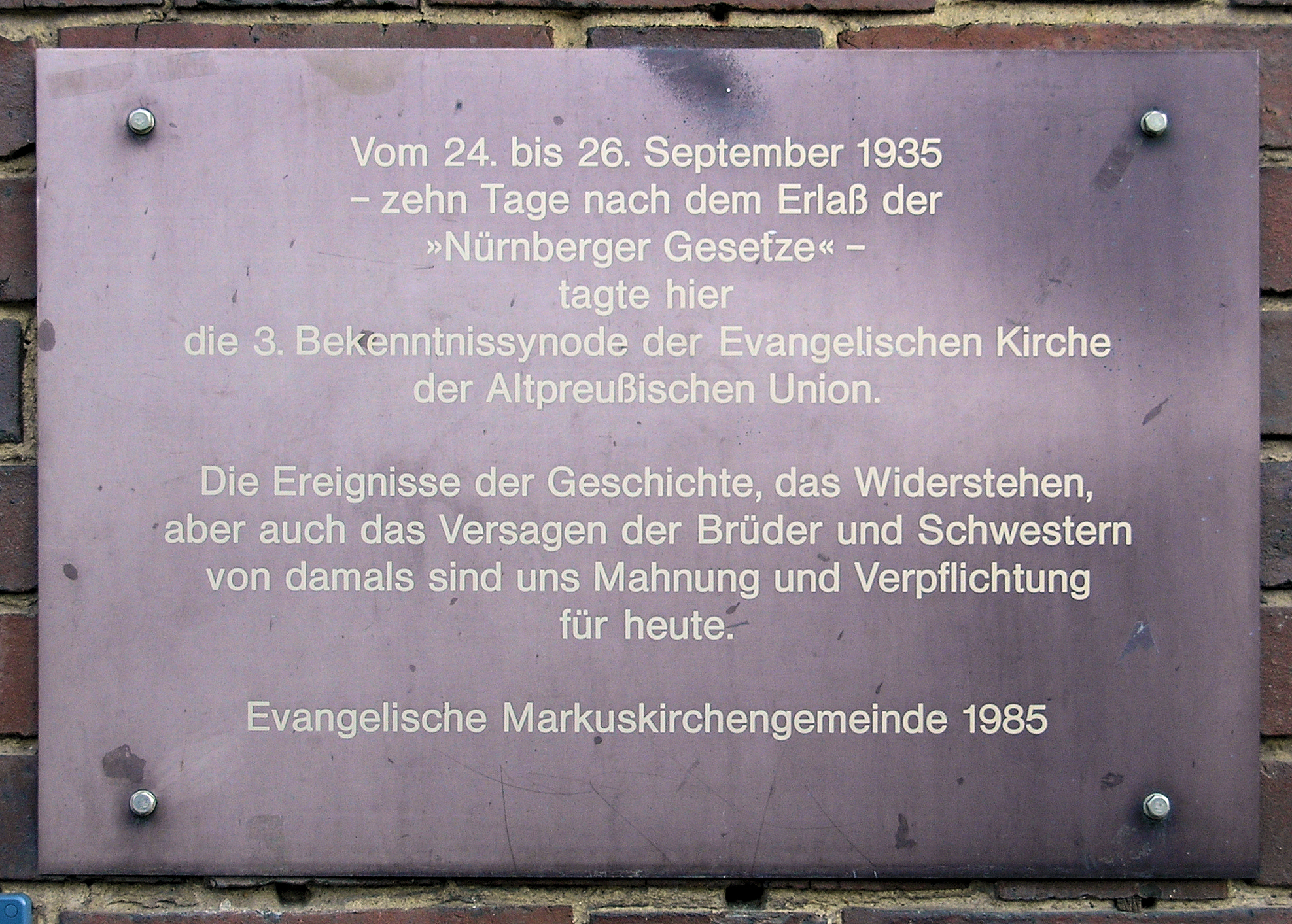
Plaque commemorating the third old-Prussian Synod of Confession and its failure to take decisions in favour of the Jews

On 10 September 1935 the old-Prussian brethren council convened preparing the upcoming third old-Prussian Synod of Confession (also Steglitz Synod). The brethren decided not to unite with the official Evangelical Church of the old-Prussian Union, unless the heretic German Christians would quit it. Supt. Albertz urged the brethren council to discuss the terrible situation of Jewish Germans and Gentile Germans of Jewish descent, as it turned by the Nuremberg Laws and all the other anti-Semitic discriminations. But the Westphalian Praeses Koch threatened he would secede the old-Prussian brethren council, if – in the synod – the council would advocate to pass a solidarity address to the Jews. On 26 September, Confessing synodals from all over the Evangelical Church of the old-Prussian Union convened for the third old-Prussian Synod of Confession in the parish hall of Berlin's Steglitz Congregation in Albrechtstraße No. 81, organised by congregants of Mark's Church Südende, Berlin.

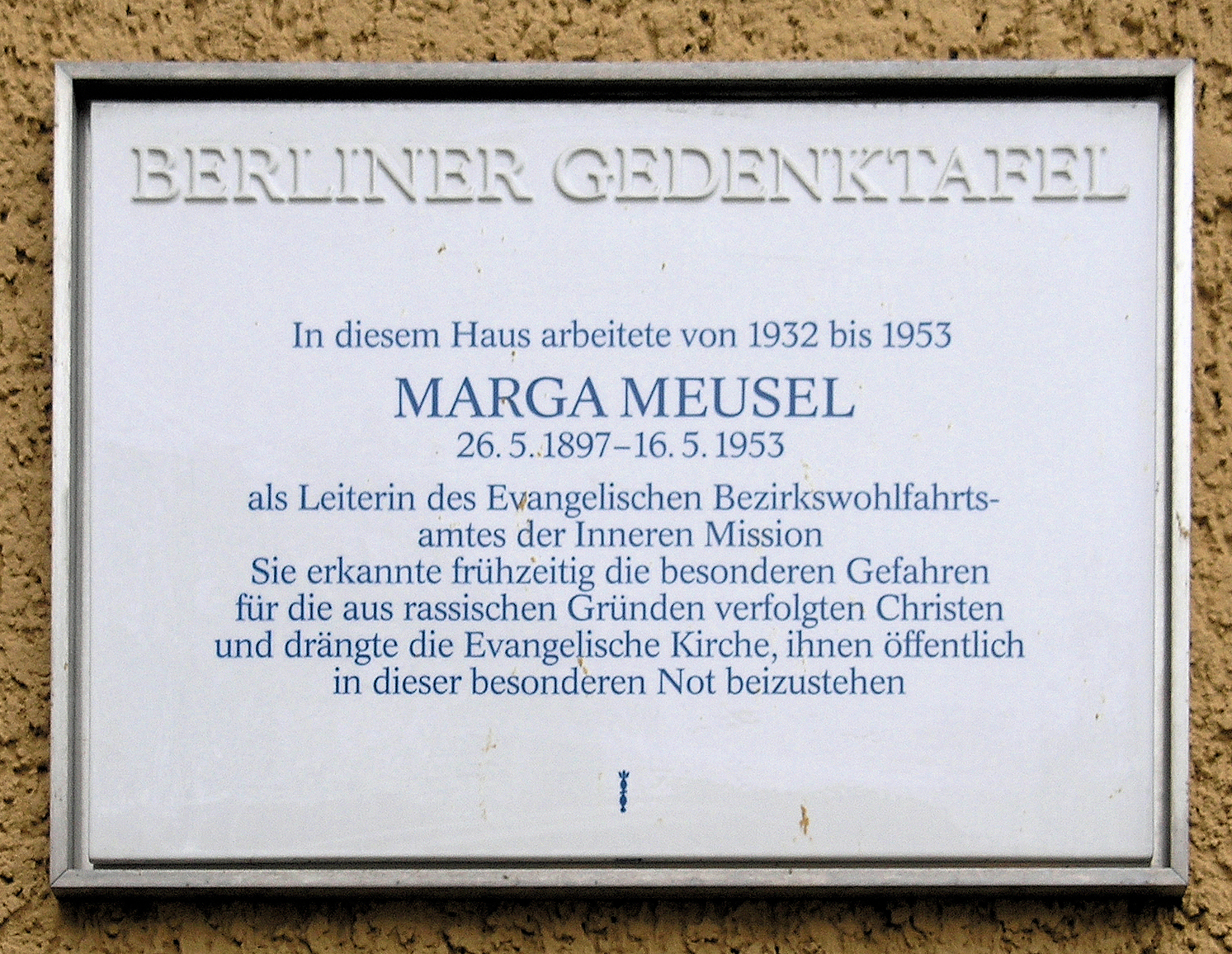
Plaque commemorating Marga Meusel

Marga Meusel, since 1932 director of the Evangelical Welfare Office for Berlin's borough of Zehlendorf (a part of today's borough of Steglitz-Zehlendorf), appealed to the synodals to take action for the persecuted Jews and Christians of Jewish descent. In her memorandum she explained – among other things – that a third of the so-called non-Aryan Protestants was unemployed due to the ever-growing number of jobs prohibited for Jews as defined by the Nuremberg Laws. She found clear words, calling the systematical impoverishment a Cold Pogrom, aiming for and resulting in – as shown by the demographic development of German Jewry under Nazi persecution so far – the extinction of the German Jewry. She quoted a criticism from the Church of Sweden, saying the new god of the Germans was the Race, to which they would offer human sacrifices.

While Supt. Albertz and Niemöller argued to discuss the memorandum, a majority of synodals refused and the memorandum was then laid ad acta. The synodals could only gain common sense about the fact, that persons of Jewish religion, were to be baptised, if they wished so. This was completely denied by the German Christians since 1932, reserving Christianity as a religion exclusively for Gentiles, but also some Confessing Christians refused the baptism of Jews.

Kerrl gained Wilhelm Zoellner (a Lutheran, until 1931 general superintendent of Westphalia) to form the Reich's Ecclesiastical Committee (German: Reichskirchenausschuss, RKA) on 3 October 1935, combining neutral, moderate Confessing Christians and moderate German Christians to reconcile the disputing church parties. So also the official German Evangelical Church became subordinate to the new bureaucracy, Ludwig Müller lost his say, but still retained the now meaningless titles of German Reich's Bishop and old-Prussian State Bishop.

In the course of November state ecclesiastical committees and provincial ecclesiastical committees were to be formed. Kerrl appointed a state ecclesiastical committee (German: Landeskirchenausschuss, LKA) for the Evangelical Church of the old-Prussian Union, led by Karl Eger, and further staffed with Supreme Consistorial Councillor Walter Kaminski (Königsberg), Pastor Theodor Kuessner (praeses of the East Prussian provincial Synod of Confession), Pastor Ernst Martin (Magdeburg), Supt. Wilhelm Ewald Schmidt (Oberhausen) und Supt. Richard Zimmermann (Bartholomew Church, Berlin, and praeses of the city synod of Berlin).

In November Kerrl decreed the parallel institutions of the Confessing Church to be dissolved, which was protested and ignored by the brethren councils. On 19 December Kerrl issued a decree which forbade all kinds of Confessing Church activities, namely appointments of pastors, education, examinations, ordinations, ecclesiastical visitations, announcements and declarations from the pulpit, separate financial structures and convening Synods of Confession; further the decree established provincial ecclesiastical committees. Thus the brethren councils had to go into hiding. The Confessing Church in the Rhenish and Westphalian ecclesiastical provinces blocked in fact the formation of provincial ecclesiastical committees until 14 February 1936.

The March of Brandenburg provincial ecclesiastical committee (est. on 19 December 1935, comprising Greater Berlin and the province of Brandenburg) consisted of Ministerial Director retd. Peter Conze (Berlin-Halensee), Senate President Engert (Berlin-Lichterfelde West), Pastor Gustav Heidenreich (Church of the Well of Salvation, Berlin-Schöneberg), General Forest-Master Walter von Keudell (Hohenlübbichow, Brandenburg), Supt. Friedrich Klein (leader of the Nazi Federation of Pastors, Bad Freienwalde), Supt. Otto Riehl (leader of the Pfarrvereine der Altpreußischen Union, a kind of trade union of pastors, Crossen upon Oder), and Supt. Zimmermann. This committee was also competent for the Ecclesiastical Province of Posen-West Prussia, with Heidenreich holding the stake. On 6 January, the members elected Zimmermann their president. On 10 January the Reich's ecclesiastical committee empowered by ordinance the provincial ecclesiastical committees to form ecclesiastical committees on the level of the deaneries, if assumed necessary. This was the case in the deanery of Berlin-Spandau.

As a gesture of reconciliation the state ecclesiastical committee for the Evangelical Church of the old-Prussian Union legitimised all ordinations and examinations of the Confessing Church retroactively for the time from 1 January 1934 to 30 November 1935. Nevertheless, the Confessing Church refused to accept the new examination office of the state ecclesiastical committee. But Künneth (Inner Mission) and a number of renowned professors of the Frederick William University of Berlin, who worked for the Confessing Church before, declared their readiness to collaborate with the committee, to wit Prof. Alfred Bertholet, Gustav Adolf Deissmann (Volkskirchlich-Evangelische Vereinigung; VEV.), Hans Lietzmann, Wilhelm Lütgert, and Julius Richter.

Thus Kerrl successfully wedged the Confessing Church. On 4 December 1935 the March of Brandenburg provincial Synod of Confession agreed to split in two provincial subsections, one for Greater Berlin and one comprising the political province of Brandenburg with two provincial brethren councils, led by Gerhard Jacobi (Berlin, resigned in 1939, but quarrels between the moderate and the Dahlemites continued) and by Scharf (Brandenburg), who followed the Dahlemite guidelines.

At the fourth Reich's Synod of Confession in Bad Oeynhausen (17–22 February 1936) the Dahlemites fell out with most of the Lutheran Confessing Christians. The first Preliminary Church Executive resigned, since its members, representing intact churches, wanted to co-operate with the committees, while its members from destroyed churches, especially the Dahlemites did not. The minority of moderate, mostly Lutheran Confessing Christians quit the Reich's Brethren Council. Also the different provincial brethren councils within the Evangelical Church of the old-Prussian Union were dissented. While most brethren councillors of Berlin wanted to co-operate, the brethren council of Brandenburg (without Berlin), of the Rhineland and the overall old-Prussian brethren council strictly opposed any compromises.

On 12 March the remaining members of the Reich's Brethren Council, presided by Niemöller, appointed the second Preliminary Church Executive, consisting of Supt. Albertz, Bernhard Heinrich Forck (St. Trinity in Hamm, Hamburg), Paul Fricke (Frankfurt-Bockenheim), Hans Böhm (Berlin), and Fritz Müller. This body was recognised by the brethren councils of the destroyed churches of the old-Prussian Union, of Bremen, of Nassau-Hesse and of Oldenburg as well as by a covenant of pastors from Württemberg (the so-called Württembergische Sozietät).

On 18 March the three Lutheran intact churches announced the foundation of the Council of the Evangelical-Lutheran Church of Germany (German: Rat der Evangelisch-Lutherischen Kirche Deutschlands, colloquially Lutherrat, Luther council) as their own umbrella organisation. The brethren councils of the Lutheran destroyed churches of Brunswick, Lübeck, Mecklenburg, the Free State of Saxony, Schleswig-Holstein, and Thuringia as well as some Lutheran confessing congregations within the territories of the Evangelical Church of the old-Prussian Union recognised this umbrella. The Confessing Church was definitely split in two. However, the state brethren councils of the destroyed churches met occasionally in conferences.

Under the impression of more foreign visitors in Germany, starting with the Winter Olympics the year of 1936 was a relatively peaceful period. Kerrl let the committees do, as they liked. Also the anti-Semitic agitation was softened. However, the Sinti and Roma in Berlin realised the first mass internments, in order to present Berlin zigeunerfrei for the 1936 Summer Olympics. But the less visible phenomena of the police state, like house searches, seizures of pamphlets and printed matters as well as the suppression of Confessing Church press continued.

At Pentecost 1936 (31 May) the second preliminary church executive issued a memorandum to Hitler, also read from the pulpits, condemning anti-Semitism, concentration camps, the state terrorism. A preliminary version had been published in foreign media earlier. "If blood, race, nationhood and honour are given the rank of eternal values, so the Evangelical Christian is compelled by the First Commandment, to oppose that judgement. If the Aryan human is glorified, so it is God's word, which testifies the sinfulness of all human beings. If – in the scope of the National Socialist Weltanschauung – an anti-Semitism, obliging to hatred of the Jews, is imposed on the individual Christian, so for him the Christian virtue of charity is standing against that." The authors concluded that the Nazi regime will definitely lead the German people into disaster.

On 7 October the Gestapo arrested Weißler, then office manager and legal advisor of the second preliminary church executive, erroneously blaming him to have played the memorandum into the hands of foreign media. Since Weißler was a Protestant of Jewish descent he was not taken to court, where the evidentially false blaming would have been easily unveiled, but deported to Sachsenhausen concentration camp and tortured to death from 13 to 19 February 1937 becoming the first lethal victim of the Kirchenkampf on the Protestant side.

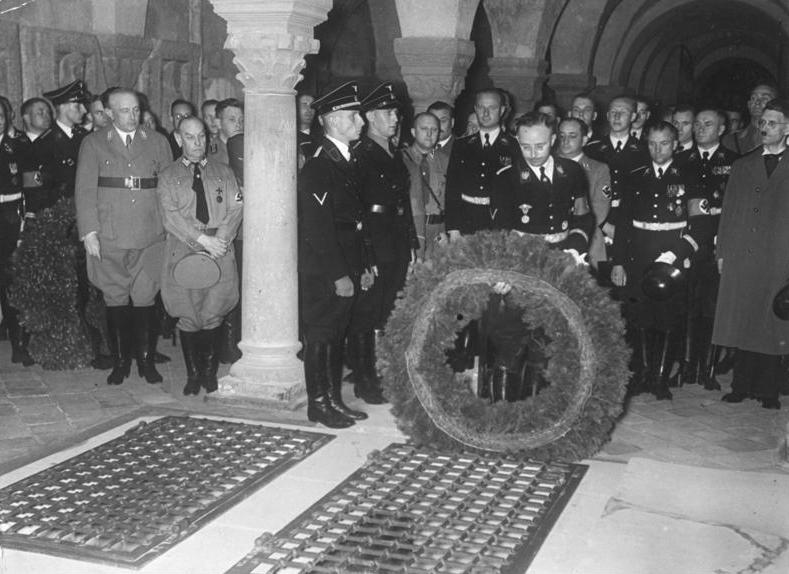
Heinrich Himmler attending the Henry the Fowler Celebration in the St Servatius Church in Quedlinburg, 1938

From 2 July 1936 until 1945 Heinrich Himmler, Reichsführer SS, captured the Quedlinburg-based Church of St Servatius of the Evangelical Church of the old-Prussian Union and profaned it as a pagan place of worship in the scope of the garbled ideas of the SS about a neo-Germanic religion.

On 15 December 1936 the old-Prussian brethren council issued a declaration, authored by Fritz Müller, criticising the compromising and shortcomings in the policy of the ecclesiastical committees. On the next day until the 18th the fourth old-Prussian Synod of Confession (also Breslau Synod) convened in Breslau, discussing the work of the ecclesiastical committees and how to continue the education and ordinations in the scope of the Confessing Church.

Meanwhile, the Olympic close hunting season had ended. The Gestapo increased its suppression, undermining the readiness for compromises among the Confessing Church. Zoellner concluded that this made his reconciliatory work impossible and criticised the Gestapo activities. He resigned on 2 February 1937, paralysing the Reich's ecclesiastical committee, which thus lost all recognition among the opposition. Kerrl now subjected Ludwig Müller's chancery of the German Evangelical Church directly to his ministry and the Reich's, provincial and state ecclesiastical committees were soon after dissolved.

The open gap in governance of the official Evangelical Church of the old-Prussian Union was filled by the still existing Evangelical Supreme Church Council under Werner and by the consistories on the provincial level. The Confessing Church now nicknamed the official Evangelical Church of the old-Prussian Union the One-Man-Church, since Werner combined unusual power as provisional president of the Evangelical Supreme Church Council and leader of the old-Prussian financial control departments. Werner now systematically drained the financial sources of the Confessing Church. Werner became the man of Kerrl. But Kerrl gave up, with Hitler and Alfred Rosenberg meanwhile completely abandoning Christianity.

However, Kerrl's ministerial bureaucracy also knew what to do without him. From now on the ministry of church affairs subjected also the other Protestant church bodies, which in 1937 amounted after mergers to 23, to state controlled financial committees. Any attempt to impose a union upon all Protestant church bodies was given up. The government now preferred to fight individual opponents by prohibitions to publish, to hold public speeches, by domiciliary arrest, banishments from certain regions, and imprisonment. Since 9 June 1937 collections of money were subject to strict state confirmation, regularly denied to the Confessing Church. In the period of the committee policy, unapproved collections were tolerated but now Confessing pastors were systematically imprisoned, who were denounced for having collected money. The number of imprisoned dignitaries of the Evangelical Church of the old-Prussian Union, mostly only temporarily, amounted to 765 in the whole year of 1937.

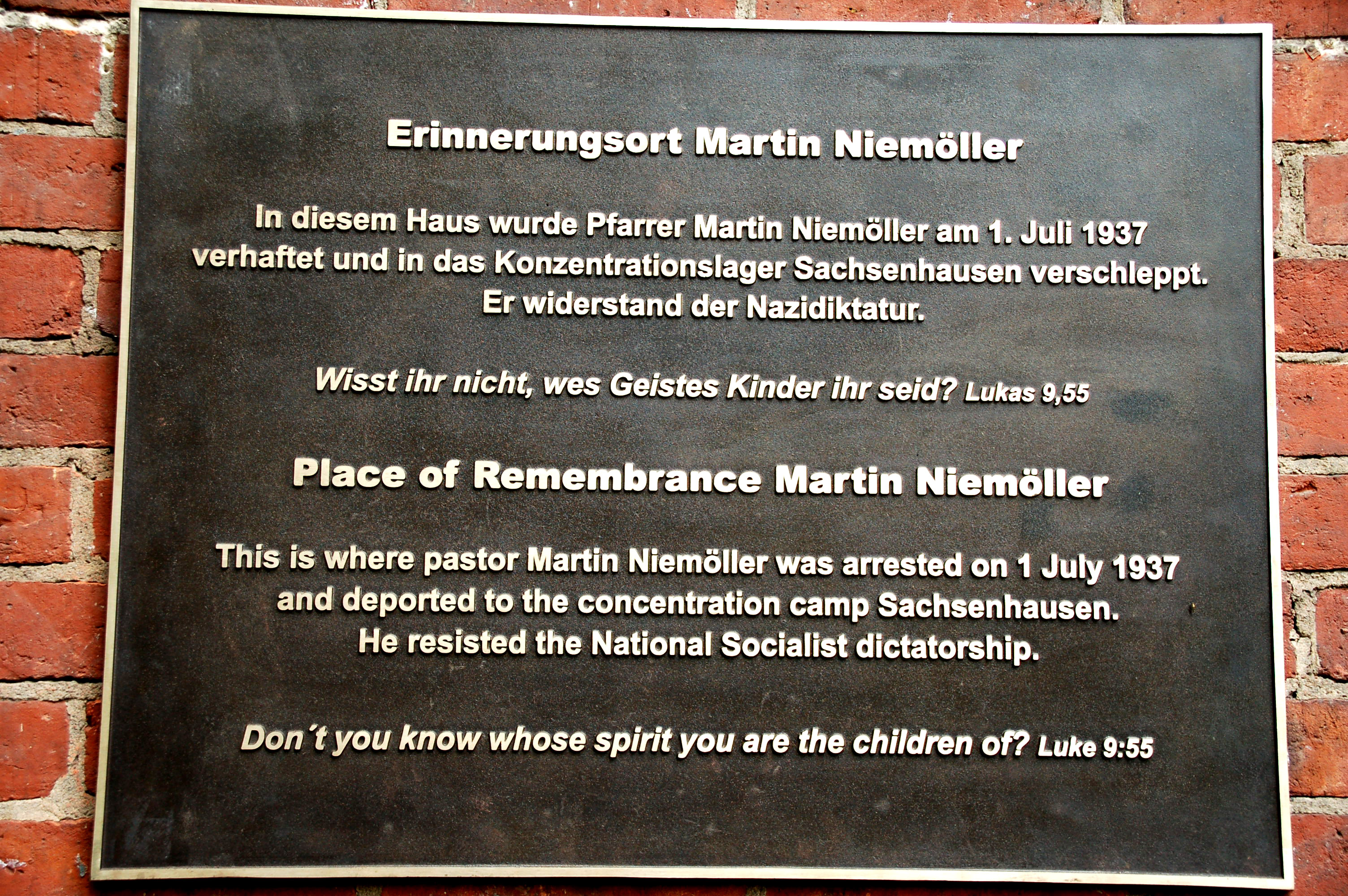
Plaque recalling the arrestment of Martin Niemöller

On 10–13 May 1937 synodals convened in Halle upon Saale to discuss denominational questions of the Reformed, Lutheran and united congregations within the old-Prussian Confessing Church. The Halle Synod also delivered the basis for the multi-denominational Protestant Arnoldshain Conference (1957) and its theses on the Lord's Supper. Soon after, on 1 July Niemöller was arrested and after months in detention he was released – the court sentenced him and regarded the term served by the time in detention, but the Gestapo took him right away into custody and imprisoned him in the concentration camp of Sachsenhausen and later in Dachau.

The fifth old-Prussian Synod of Confession (also Lippstadt Synod) convened its synodals in Lippstadt on 21–27 August 1937 debating financial matters. After the toughening of financial control the synodals decided to keep up collections, but more in hiding, and restarted regular rogations for the imprisoned, reading their names from the pulpit. In autumn 1937 the Gestapo further suppressed the underground theological education (KiHo) and systematically fought any examinations within the Confessing Church.

On 10 December 1937 the ministry of church affairs appointed Werner as president of the Evangelical Supreme Church Council. Werner then restaffed the March of Brandenburg consistory, newly appointing Johannes Heinrich as consistorial president (after almost a year of vacancy) and three further members of German Christian affiliation: Siegfried Nobiling, Fritz Loerzer (formerly also Provost of Kurmark) and Pastor Karl Themel (Luisenstadt Congregation, Berlin). The remaining prior members were the German Christian Walter Herrmann (Melanchthon Church Wilhelmstadt, Berlin), Friedrich Riehm (German Christian), Helmut Engelhardt and von Arnim-Kröchlendorff (Confessing Church), Ernst Bender, and Friedrich Wendtlandt. In February 1938 Werner divested von Arnim-Kröchlendorff as chief of the financial department of Berlin, and replaced him by the Nazi official Erhard von Schmidt, who then severed the financial drainage of Berlin's Confessing Church.

For Hitler's birthday (20 April 1938) Werner developed a special gift. All pastors of the Evangelical Church of the old-Prussian Union should swear an oath of allegiance to Hitler. In May the seventh Synod of Confession of the Rhenish ecclesiastical province refused to comply, since it was not the state, which demanded the oath.

The sixth old-Prussian Synod of Confession convened twice in Berlin, once in the Nikolassee Church (11–13 June 1938) and a second time in the parish hall of the Steglitz Congregation (31 July). In Nikolassee the oath was much under discussion, however, no decision was taken, but delayed – until further information would be available. At the second meeting in Steglitz a majority of synodals complied to Werner's demand. In August Martin Bormann, the Reich's leader of the Nazi party, declared that Hitler was not interested in an oath. However, the consistories demanded the oath, but in the Rhenish ecclesiastical province only 184 out 800 pastors refused to swear.

In summer 1938 Kerrl reappeared on the scene with a new attempt to unite the church parties from their midst, using a federation named Wittenberger Bund, initiated Friedrich Buschtöns (German Christians), Theodor Ellwein, and Prof. Helmuth Kittel, all members of the Evangelical Supreme Church Council. Kerrl failed again.

==== Protestants of Jewish descent ====
The ever-growing discrimination of Jewish Germans (including the special category of Geltungsjuden) and Gentile Germans of Jewish descent drove them ever deeper into impoverishment. The official church body completely refused to help its persecuted parishioners of Jewish descent, let alone the Germans of Jewish faith. But also the activists of the Confessing Church, bothered about this problem – like Supt. Albertz, Bonhoeffer, Charlotte Friedenthal, Pastor Heinrich Grüber (Jesus Church, Berlin-Kaulsdorf), Hermann Maas, Meusel, Pastor Werner Sylten could not prevail with their concern to help under the umbrella of the Confessing Church, since also among the opponents many, Lutherans more than Calvinists, had anti-Jewish affects or were completely occupied with maintaining the true Protestant faith under state suppression.

Even though the opponents managed to fight the Aryan paragraph within the Evangelical Church of the old-Prussian Union (Ludwig Müller abrogated it on 16 November 1934), it took the Confessing Church until summer 1938 to build up a network for the persecuted.

In early 1933 Friedrich Siegmund-Schultze proposed the foundation of an International Relief Committee for German (Evangelical, Catholic and Mosaic) Emigrants (German: Internationales Hilfskomitee für deutsche (evangelische, katholische und mosaische) Auswanderer). The project was in a tailspin since the oecumenical partners in the US demanded to exclude persons of Jewish faith, before it definitely failed because the Nazi government expelled Siegmund-Schultze from Germany.

In July 1933 Christian Germans of Jewish descent had founded a self-help organisation, first named Reich's Federation of non-Aryan Christians (German: Reichsverband nichtarischer Christen), then renamed into Paul's Covenant (German: Paulusbund) after the famous Jewish convert to Christianity (Sha'ul) Paul of Tarsos, presided by the known literary historian Heinrich Spiero. In early 1937 the Nazi government forbade that organisation, allowing a new successor organisation Association 1937 (German: Vereinigung 1937), which was prohibited to accept members – like Spiero – with three or four grandparents, who had been enrolled with a Jewish congregation. Thus that new association had lost its most prominent leaders and faded, having become an organisation of so-called Mischlinge of Nazi terminology. Spiero opened his private relief office in Brandenburgische Straße No. 41 (Berlin).

On 31 January 1936 the International Church Relief Commission for German Refugees constituted in London – with Supt. Albertz representing the Confessing Church – but its German counterpart never materialised. So Bishop George Bell gained his sister-in-law Laura Livingstone to run an office for the international relief commission in Berlin. She joined the office of Spiero.

The failure of the Confessing Church was evident, even though 70–80% of the Christian Germans of Jewish descent were Protestants. In August 1938 the Nazi government forced Jewish Germans and Gentile Germans of Jewish descent to adopt the middle names Israel or Sara and to use them on any occasion, such as signatures, visit cards, letters, addresses and firm and name signs.

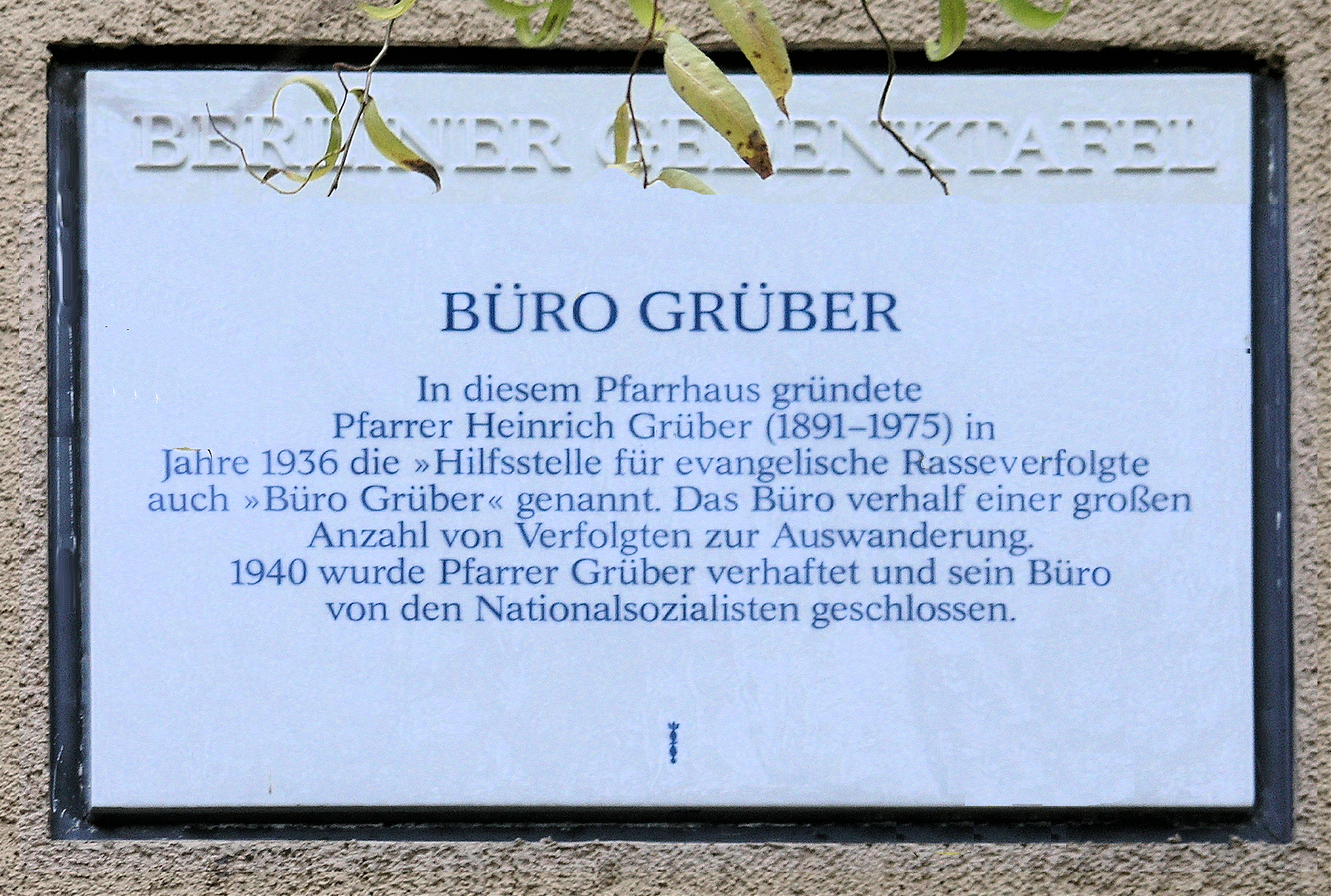
Plaque commemorating the foundation of the Bureau Grüber in 1936

It was Grüber and some enthusiasts, who had started a new effort in 1936. They forced the Confessing Church's hand, which in 1938 supported the new organisation, named by the Gestapo Bureau Grüber, but after its official recognition Relief Centre for Evangelical Non-Aryans. Until May 1939 25 regional offices could be opened, led by those executive directors of the provincial Inner Mission premises, who clung to the Confessing Church or the latter's other mandatees.

Supt. Albertz, Pastor Adolf Kurtz (Twelve Apostles Church, Berlin), and Livingstone collaborated. The Bureau was mainly busy with supporting the re-education in other vocations, not (yet) prohibited for Jewish Germans and Gentile Germans of Jewish descent, and with finding nations of exile, who would grant immigration visa. As long as the Nazis' decision, to murder all persons they considered as Jews, had not yet been taken, the Bureau gained some government recognition as an agency, promoting the emigration of the concerned persons.

In the night of 9 November 1938 the Nazi government organised the November Pogrom, often euphemised as Kristallnacht. The well-organised Nazi squads killed several hundreds, set nine out of 12 major synagogues in Berlin on fire (1,900 synagogues all over Germany), 1,200 Jewish Berliners were deported to Sachsenhausen concentration camp. All over Germany altogether 30,000 male Jews were arrested, among them almost all the 115 Protestant pastors with three or four grandparents, who had been enrolled as members of a Jewish congregation. Many men went into hiding from arrestment and also appeared at Grüber's home in the rectory of the Jesus Church, Berlin-Kaulsdorf. Grüber organised their hiding in the cottages in the allotment clubs in his parish.

The Nazis only released the arrested inmates, if they would immediately emigrate. Thus getting visa became the main target and problem. While Bishop George Bell tried and managed to rescue many of the imprisoned pastors, successfully persuading the Church of England to provide them through the British government with British visa, the official Evangelical Church of the old-Prussian Union did not even try to intervene in favour of its imprisoned clergy. Thus none of the Protestant pastors of Jewish descent remained in or returned to office. Also the many other inmates had no advocate of such influence like the Church of England.

On 7 December 1938 the British organisation Hebrew Christian Testimony to Israel relinquished its location in Oranienburger Straße 20/21 to Grüber, who thus moved his Bureau thereto. Kurtz relocated his consultations, until then held in his private home in the rectory of the Twelve Apostles Church (Berlin), into the new office location. The staff of the Bureau Grüber grew to five persons on 19 December, then 30 in February 1939 and finally 35 by July the same year. Pastor Werner Sylten, who had been fired – on the grounds of his partially Jewish descent – by his employer, the German Christian-dominated Thuringian Evangelical Church, joined the work.

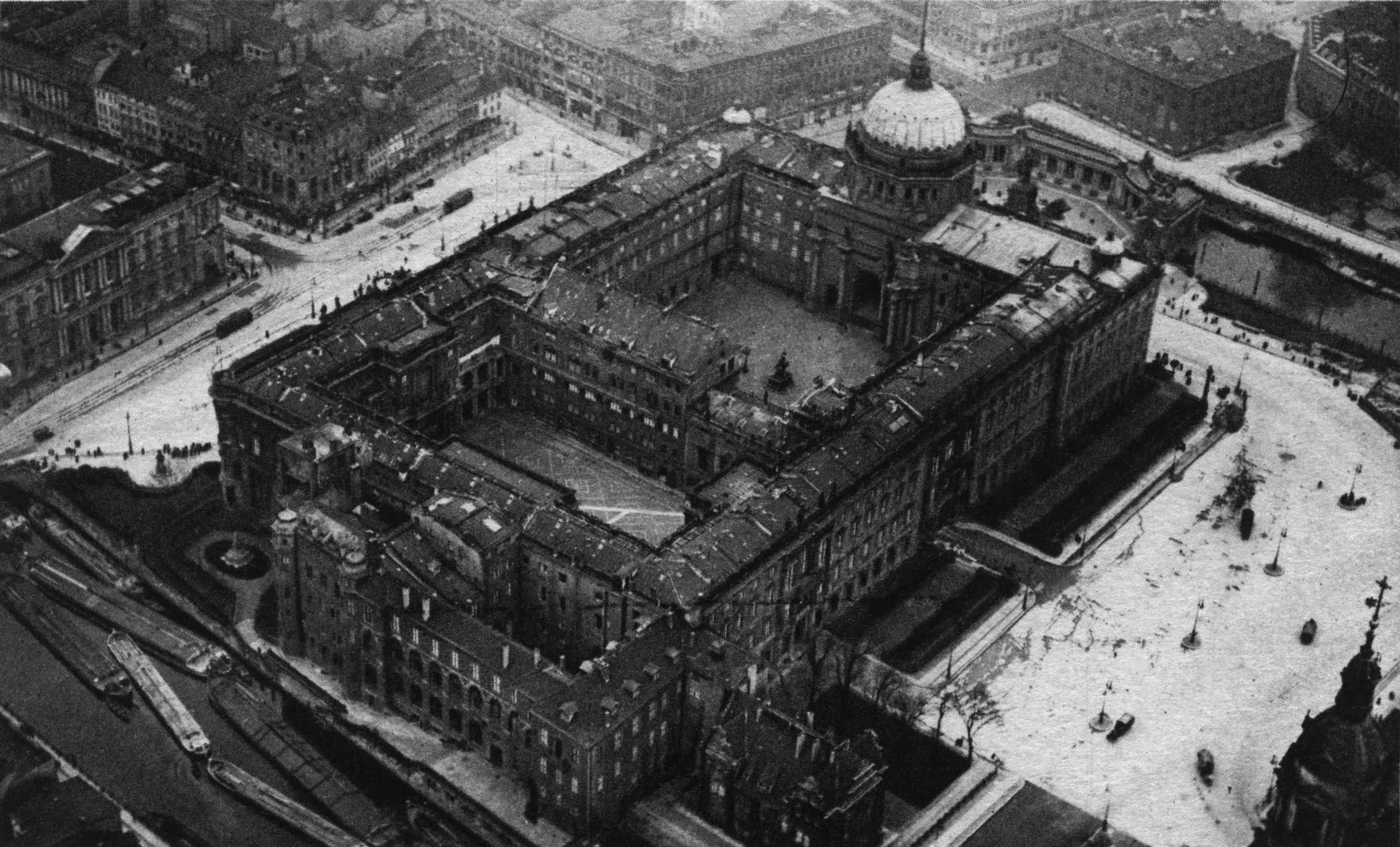
Berlin City Castle with the house An der Stechbahn #3–4 right in the midst of the top edge of the photo, the four-storied building, with wide arched windows on the third floor, housed the Bureau Grüber

Sylten found additional office rooms in the street An der Stechbahn #3–4 opposite to the southern façade of the Berlin City Castle, and on 25 January 1939 the Bureau's emigration department, led by Ministerial Counsel rtrd. Paul Heinitz, moved into the new location. Grüber's wife, Marianne, née Vits, sold her IG Farben shares to finance the rent of the new location. Livingstone led the department for the British Commonwealth, Werner Hirschwald the Latin American section and Sylvia Wolff the Scandinavian. By October 1939 all offices of Grüber's Bureau moved to An der Stechbahn. A welfare department under Richard Kobrak supported the often impoverished victims of persecution and Margarete Draeger organised the Kindertransporte. Erwin Reisner served the victims as chaplain. Inge Jacobson worked as assistant of Grüber. Sylten became his deputy.

In February 1939 the Reich's ministry of the interior combined the work of all offices busy with expelling Jewish Germans and Gentile Germans of Jewish descent in the Reich's central office for Jewish Emigration (German: Reichszentrale für jüdische Auswanderung), led by Reinhard Heydrich. Adolf Eichmann came to doubtable fame for expelling 50,000 Jewish Austrians and Gentile Austrians of Jewish descent within only three months after the Anschluß. Thus he was commissioned to expel Jewish Germans and Gentile Germans of Jewish descent within the old Reich's borders. From September 1939 the Bureau Grüber had to subordinate to the supervision by Eichmann, who worked as Special Referee for the Affairs of the Jews (German: Sonderreferent für Judenangelegenheiten) in an office in Kurfürstenstraße #115–116, Berlin. Eichmann asked Grüber in a meeting about Jewish emigration why Grüber, not having any Jewish family and with no prospect for any thank, does help the Jews. Grüber answered because the Good Samaritan did so, and my Lord told me to do so.

From 1 March 1939 the Nazi Reich's government commissioned the Reichsvertretung der Deutschen Juden to levy a new tax from Jewish emigrants (German: Auswandererabgabe), charging wealthier emigrants in order to finance the emigration of the poorer. The due was also used to finance the different recognised associations organising emigration. From 1 July on the Reichsvertretung remitted a monthly subsidy of Reichsmark (ℛℳ) 5,000 to the Bureau Grüber. Also the intact Evangelical Lutheran Church in Bavaria right of the river Rhine co-financed the work of Grüber's organisation with annually ℛℳ 10,000. By July the office of Spiero and Livingstone had merged into the Bureau Grüber. All in all the Bureau Grüber enabled the emigration of 1,139 persons from October 1938 – August 1939 and 580 between July 1939 and October 1940, according to different sources.

Minister Rust had banned all pupils of Jewish descent from attending public schools from 15 November 1938 on. So Pastor Kurtz and Vicar Klara Hunsche opened an Evangelical school in January 1939 in the rectory of the Twelve Apostles Congregation (An der Apostelkirche No. 3, Berlin). By the end of January the school moved into Oranienburger Straße # 20/21, after Grüber's Emigration department had moved out. The Reichsvereinigung der Juden in Deutschland, since July replacing the Reichsvertretung as the new and only central organisation competent for all persons and institutions persecuted as Jewish according to the Nuremberg Laws, supervised the school. Now the school became an Evangelical-Catholic oecumenical school, called Familienschule, the pupils named it Grüber School.

By autumn 1939 a new degree of persecution loomed. The Nazi authorities started to deport Jewish Austrians and Gentile Austrians of Jewish descent to occupied Poland. On 13 February 1940 the same fate hit 1,200 Jewish Germans and Gentile Germans of Jewish descent and their Gentile spouses from the Stettin Region, who were deported to Lublin. Grüber learned about it by the Wehrmacht commander of Lublin and then protested to every higher ranking superior up to the then Prussian Minister-President Hermann Göring, who forbade further deportations from Prussia for the moment. The Gestapo warned Grüber never to take the side of the deported again. The deported were not allowed to return.

On 22–23 October, 6,500 Jewish Germans and Gentile Germans of Jewish descent from Baden and the Palatinate were deported to Gurs, occupied France. Now Grüber got himself a passport, with the help of Bonhoeffer's brother-in-law Hans von Dohnanyi from the Abwehr, to visit the deported in the Gurs (concentration camp). But before he left the Gestapo arrested Grüber on 19 December and deported him two days later to Sachsenhausen concentration camp, and in 1941 to Dachau concentration camp. Sylten was ordered to shut down the Bureau, which he did until 1 February 1941. On 27 February the Gestapo arrested and deported him by end of May to Dachau concentration camp, where he was murdered in August 1942. Grüber survived and was released from Dachau on 23 June 1943, after he had signed not to help the persecuted any more.

The Family school was ordered to close by the end of June 1942. Draeger dived into the underground by the end of 1942, hiding in Berlin and surviving through some undaunted helpers, but was caught later and deported to Auschwitz in August 1944, where she perished. Persons hiding from deportation used to call themselves submarine (German: U-Boot). The fate of other collaborators of the Bureau: Paul Heinitz died in peace in February 1942, Günther Heinitz, Werner Hirschwald, Max Honig, Inge Jacobson, Elisabeth Kayser and Richard Kobrak were all deported and murdered in different concentration camps. Since January 1943 Pastor Braune could hide Luise Wolff in the diaconal Hoffnungstal Institution, so she survived.

Among the undaunted helpers in the Evangelical Church of the old-Prussian Union, hiding and feeding the 'submarines', were many women, but also men, such as Bolette Burckhardt, Pastor Theodor Burckhardt, Helene Jacobs, Franz Kaufmann, Pastor Wilhelm Jannasch, Pastor Harald Poelchau, Pastor Eitel-Friedrich von Rabenau, Gertrud Staewen, Pastor Hans Urner etc.

In 1945 right after the war Grüber reopened his Bureau to help the survivors, first in provisional rooms in the deaconesses' Bethany Hospital in Berlin-Kreuzberg. Then the bureau, named today Evangelical Relief Centre for the formerly Racially Persecuted (German: Evangelische Hilfsstelle für ehemals Rasseverfolgte), moved to its present site in Berlin-Zehlendorf, Teltower Damm #124. In 1950 three-quarters of the fostered survivors were unemployed and poor. Many needed psychological help, others wanted support to apply for government compensation for the damages and suffering by the Nazi persecution. In 1958 Grüber established a foundation, running today senior homes and a nursing home, housing about a hundred survivors.

==== After the November Pogrom ====
In the night between 9 and 10 November the Nazis organised the November Pogrom. German Christians, like Bishop Martin Sasse of the Thuringian Evangelical Church, welcomed the pogrom.

For the Buß- und Bettag (16 November 1938), the Day of Repentance and Prayer, then celebrated in the Evangelical Church of the old-Prussian Union on the penultimate Wednesday before the new begin of the Evangelical Liturgical year (First Sunday of Advent), the Dahlemite fraction of the Confessing Church decided to hold rogations for the persecuted Jews and Christians of Jewish descent. The pastors were recommended the following text: "Administer to the needs of all the Jews in our midst, who are losing for the sake of their blood their honour as humans and the opportunity to live. Help that nobody will act vengefully against them. ... Especially do not let disrupt the bond of love to those, who are standing with us in the same true belief and who are through Him like us Thy children."

Elisabeth Schmitz, a congregant in the preach on the Day of Repentance and Prayer of Helmut Gollwitzer, then replacing the imprisoned Niemöller in St. Ann's Church Dahlem, Berlin, appealed to the Confessing Church to reject any labelling of Jews, warning that after the labelling of all the Jewish owned shops in August 1938, their destruction followed suit, so the same would also happen – "in the same conscienceless, evil and sadistic manner" – to the persons, once they would be labelled.

Holding Synods of Confession had been forbidden since 1935, but now after the Olympic close hunting season had ended the authorities effectively fought the preparations and holding of the synods. Thus synods had to be prepared in secret, therefore they were not referred to by the name of their venue any more, keeping the venue as long as possible in secret. The seventh old-Prussian Synod of Confession (so-called Epiphany Synod) convened on 29–31 January 1939 in Berlin-Nikolassee.

On 18 and 20 March 1939 Werner, the president of Evangelical Supreme Church Council, severed the dismissal of opposing pastors by new ordinances, which empowered him to redeploy pastors against their will. On 6 May Kerrl supported the opening of the Institute for the Study and Elimination of Jewish Influence on German Church Life (German: Institut zur Erforschung und Beseitigung des jüdischen Einflusses auf das deutsche kirchliche Leben) in Eisenach, led by Prof. Walter Grundmann. This institute provided propaganda to all official congregations, how to cleanse Protestantism from the Jewish patrimony within Christianity.

On 20–22 May 1939 the synodals convened for the eighth old-Prussian Synod of Confession in Steglitz (so-called Exaudi Synod).

With the beginning of the war (1 September 1939) Kerrl decreed the separation of the ecclesiastical and the administrative governance within the official Evangelical Church of the old-Prussian Union. Werner remained administrative chief executive (president of the Evangelical Supreme Church Council), an ecclesiastical executive was still to be found. Werner won Marahrens, State Bishop of the 'intact' Hanoverian Church, and the theologists Walther Schultz (German Christian), and Friedrich Hymmen, vice president of the Evangelical Supreme Church Council, to form an Ecclesiastical Council of Confidence (German: Geistlicher Vertrauensrat), taking the ecclesiastical leadership for the German Evangelical Church from early 1940 on. Within the official Evangelical Church of the old-Prussian Union the same function remained void.

From 1938 on the Nazis had tested the reaction of the general public to the murder of incurably sick people by films, articles, books and reports covering the subject. The murder of the handicapped and the incurably sick was euphemised as Euthanasia. However, the so-called mercy killing of the sick did not become popular in the general public. Nevertheless, the Nazi Reich's government started to implement the murder. On 1 September 1939, the day Germany waged war on Poland, Hitler decreed the murder of the handicapped, living in sanatories, to be carried out by ruthless doctors. After first murders in a testing phase the systematic murder started in 1940.

==== Beginning of the war ====
On 22 August 1939 Hitler gathered the Wehrmacht generals and explained them the archaic character of the upcoming war: "Our strength is our speed and our brutality. Genghis Khan chased millions of women and children to death, consciously and with a happy heart. History sees him only as a great founder of states. It is of no concern, what the weak Western European civilisation is saying about me. I issued the command – and I will have everybody executed, who will only utter a single word of criticism – that it is not the aim of the war to reach particular lines, but to physically annihilate the enemy. Therefore, I have mobilised my Death's Head Squads, for the time being only in the East, with the command to unpityingly and mercilessly send men, women and children of Polish descent and language to death. This is the only way to gain the Lebensraum, which we need. Who is still talking today about the extinction of the Armenians?" Hitler did not feel safe about the opinions of his generals, so he threatened them with execution, not allowing any criticical word about the planned genocide of the Poles.

After the government waged war on Poland and thus started the Second World War, male members of the Confessing Church, such as Fritz Müller (member of the second preliminary church executive), were preferently drafted for the army. Kerrl demanded Werner to calm down the struggle of the churches, since the Wehrmacht wanted no activities against pastors of the Confessing Church during the war. So Gestapo and official church functionaries concentrated on pastors of the Confessing Church, who were not drafted. In January 1940, urged by the Wehrmacht, Hitler repeated that no wide-ranging actions against the Confessing Church are to be taken, so that the Gestapo returned to selective forms of repression.

But in a meeting with Nazi partisans Hitler expressed that he recognised the Wehrmacht's – even though only to a limited extent – clinging to the churches, as its weakness. As to the question of the churches he said: "The war is in this respect, as well as in many another occasion, a favourable opportunity to finish it [the question of the churches] thoroughly." Already in antiquity complete peoples have been liquidated. Tribes have been resettled just like this, and exactly the Soviet Union has recently given sufficient examples, how one could do that. [...] If he [Hitler] does not do anything yet about the rebelling 'shavelings', so not least because of the Wehrmacht. There [among Wehrmacht members] one is still running to field-services. [...] But in this respect the education within the SS would foreshadow the necessary development, with the SS proving – right now in the war – that schooled in Weltanschauung – one will be bold – without the dear God." Thus Hitler's adjutant Major Gerhard Engel recalled the conversation.

With the conquest of all the eastern former Prussian territories, which Germany had ceded to Poland after World War I, and their annexation by Nazi Germany the functionaries of the Evangelical Church of the old-Prussian Union expected the reintegration of the United Evangelical Church in Poland. But this conflicted with the Nazi intention to convert the annexed territory, especially the Warthegau under Arthur Greiser, into an exemplary Nazi dictatorship.

No prior civilian German administration existed in the Warthegau, so a solely Nazi party-aligned administration was set up. Concerns respected within Germany, played no role in occupied and annexed parts of Poland. German law, as violated as it was, would not automatically apply to the Warthegau, but only selected rules. Almost all the Catholic, Jewish and Protestant clergy in the Warthegau was murdered or expelled, with the exception of some German-speaking Protestant pastors and few such Catholic priests. The mostly German-speaking United Evangelical Church in Poland under Gen.-Supt. Paul Blau, having lacked official recognition by the Polish government, expected a change by the German annexation, which happened but to the opposite of the expected.

In March 1940 Greiser decreed an ordinance for the Warthegau, which declared the church bodies not to be statutory bodies, as in Germany, but mere private associations. Minors under 18 years were banned to attend meetings and services, in order to alienate them from Christianity. All church property, except of a prayer hall, was to be expropriated. All pastors of the United Evangelical Church in Poland there were subjected to strict state control and expelled at the slightest suspect of criticism of the murders and expulsions carried out daily in the Warthegau. Pastors, who would dare to speak up for the Jewish heritage within Christianity, such as the ten commandments, risked at minimum expulsion and maltreatment, if not deportation into a concentration camp.

The Warthegau remained blocked, while the functionaries of the official Evangelical Supreme Church Council managed to reintegrate the congregations of the United Evangelical Church in Poland, located in Polish Greater Pomerania (Pomerellia), into the newly formed Ecclesiastical Region of Danzig-West Prussia (Kirchengebiet Danzig-Westpreußen), since 1940 also comprising the congregations of Danzig's regional synodal federation, and thus competent for all congregations of united Protestant church bodies in the homonymous Reichsgau. When in October 1940 Kerrl – for the Nazi Ministry of religious Affairs – tried to take control over the churches in the Warthegau, Greiser prohibited him to do so.

The reinitiated government murders of the disabled, meanwhile including even war invalids, startled proponents of the Confessing Church bodies. Representatives of the Confessing Church and the Roman Catholic Church protested at the Nazi Reich's government against the murders, which also included inmates of Christian sanatories. On 4 December 1940 Reinhold Sautter, Supreme Church Councillor of Württemberg, reproached the Nazi Ministerial Councillor Eugen Stähle for the murders in Grafeneck Castle, the latter then confronted him with the Nazi government opinion, that "The fifth commandment: Thou shalt not kill, is no commandment of God but a Jewish invention" and cannot claim any validity any more. The Catholic Bishop Clemens von Galen of the Diocese of Münster (Westphalia) was the first to protest publicly against the murders in summer 1941. In December Wurm and Adolf Bertram, Catholic Archbishop of Breslau, followed suit. The Nazi Reich's government then stopped the murders only to resume them soon later in a more secret way. The representatives of the official Evangelical Church of the old-Prussian Union, like its then leader Werner silenced about the murders.

Werner continued to streamline the ecclesiastical institutions. In early 1941 he appointed Oskar Söhngen, simultaneously member of the Evangelical Supreme Church Council, as ecclesiastical leader of the March of Brandenburg consistory. With the help of the Gestapo the parallel institutions of education and examination of the Confessing Church were successfully destroyed in the course of 1941. Supt. Albertz und Hans Böhm, the leaders of those educational institutions were arrested in July 1941. Söhngen protested and resigned from the consistory by the end of 1942.

From 1 September 1941 on Jewish Germans and Gentile Germans of Jewish descent with three or four grandparents, who were enrolled with a Jewish congregation, and the special category of Geltungsjuden had to wear the Yellow badge. Thus the concerned congregants were easily to be identified by others. One of the rare reactions came from Vicar Katharina Staritz, competent for the synodal region of the city of Breslau. In a circular she prompted the congregations in Breslau to take care of the concerned parishioners with special love and suggested that while services other respected congregants would sit next to their stigmatised fellow congregants in order to oppose this unwanted distinction. The Nazi media heftily attacked her and the Gestapo deported her to a concentration camp (she was later released), while the official Silesian ecclesiastical province fired her.

Systematic deportations of Jewish Germans and Gentile Germans of Jewish descent started on 18 October 1941. These were all directed to Ghettos in Nazi-occupied Europe or to concentration camps. In October 1941 proponents of the Confessing Church reported about Auschwitz (concentration camp), newly opened on 23 September, that Jews were gassed there. The members of the second preliminary church executive could not believe it and did not speak up. On 8–9 November, the tenth old-Prussian Synod of Confession convened in the premises of the St. Trinity Church (Hamburg-Hamm; Evangelical Lutheran Church in the Hamburgian State), outside of Prussia. Forck, member of the second preliminary church executive organised it. The synod dealt with replacing recruited pastors by female vicars, presbyters and laypersons.

On 22 December 1941 the official German Evangelical Church called for suited actions by all Protestant church bodies to withhold baptised non-Aryans from all spheres of Protestant church life. Many German Christian-dominated congregations followed suit. The second preliminary church executive of the Confessing German Evangelical Church together with the conference of the state brethren councils (representing the destroyed churches including the Evangelical Church of the old-Prussian Union) issued a declaration of protest. Confessing congregations in the Ecclesiastical Province of Pomerania and the Congregation of Neubabelsberg handed in lists of signatures in protest against the exclusion of the stigmatised Protestants of Jewish descent. Also the Evangelical Supreme Church Council of the 'intact' Evangelical State Church in Württemberg and its Bishop Wurm sent letters of protest on 27 January and 6 February 1942, respectively.

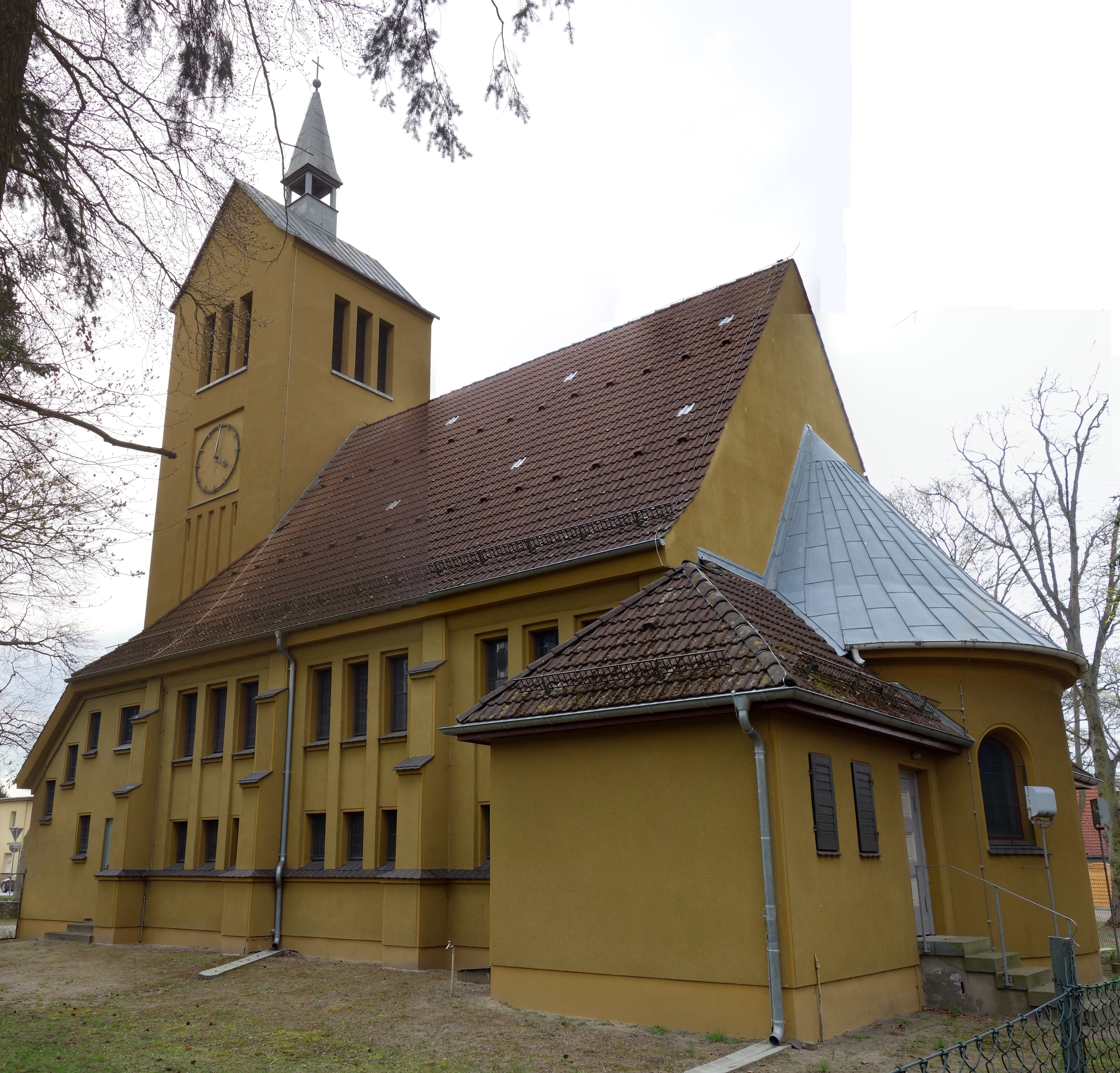
Sachsenhausen Church, in early 1943 the place of the first ordination of women as pastors of full competence equal to male colleagues

On 17–18 October 1942 the eleventh old-Prussian Synod of Confession convened again in Hamm, Hamburg. The majority of the synodal members voted against the motion to allow women to be ordained as pastors. However, the outspoken advocates of women's ordination continued to pursue their goal. On 12 January 1943 Kurt Scharf, praeses of the Brandenburg provincial Synod of Confession (Bekenntnissynode) and pastor in Sachsenhausen, ordained Ilse Härter and Hannelotte Reiffen in his church, the two women wearing the full ministerial robes, as the first women in Germany as pastors equal to their male colleagues.

Until 1943 almost all the remaining Jewish Germans and Gentile Germans of Jewish descent have been deported to the concentration camps. Thus on 10 June, the Reichssicherheitshauptamt dissolved the Reichsvereinigung der Juden in Deutschland and deported the tiny rest of its collaborators 6 days later to Theresienstadt. There about 800 Protestants of Jewish descent from all German church bodies founded a Protestant congregation. Pastor Hans Encke (Cologne) had ordained parishioners from his congregation, who were to be deported and wanted to work as chaplains at the place, where they would come to. The only German Jews and German Gentiles of Jewish descent, who were in fact not deported, were those living in so-called privileged mixed marriage, which in 1933 amounted to about 40,000 couples nationwide.

Shortly before the next old-Prussian Synod of Confession, in early October 1943 the old-Prussian Brethren Council of the Confessing Church decided to generally allow the ordination of women, followed by the ordination of Annemarie Grosch, Sieghild Jungklaus, Margarethe Saar, Lore Schlunk, Ruth Wendland and Gisela von Witzleben altogether on 16 October 1943 in Lichterfelde (a locality of Berlin). On the twelfth old-Prussian Synod of Confession (16–19 October 1943) in Breslau the synodals passed a declaration against the ongoing murder of Jews and the handicapped which was read from the pulpits in the confessing congregations. It backed its decisions with the commandment Thou shalt not kill, later issuing leaflets and brochures with guidelines for the parishioner. But overall, the persecutions and arrestments – as well as the increasing weariness in the long duration of the war with 72 weekly work hours – made most members acquiesce.

==== Wartime impact on the church ====
The Allied Strategic bombing during World War II on Germany first reached the areas of the Rhenish and the Westphalian ecclesiastical provinces of the Evangelical Church of the old-Prussian Union (especially in the Ruhr Area). The massive devastations of inhabited areas of course also included church buildings and other church-owned real estate. In the course of the ever intensifying further spreading Allied bombing the Evangelical Church of the old-Prussian Union suffered substantial losses of church structures in all ecclesiastical provinces, especially in the cities, including many buildings of considerable historical and/or architectural value.

In the city of Berlin e.g., out of the 191 churches belonging to the Evangelical Church of the old-Prussian Union 18 were completely destroyed, 68 were severely damaged, 54 had considerable, 49 had light damages and 2 remained untouched. The March of Brandenburg consistory was badly damaged in early 1944 and burnt completely out on 3 February 1945. The offices were relocated to Baršć/Forst in Lusatia and into the rectory of the Trinity Congregation (Berlin-Friedrichstadt) as well as into rooms in Potsdam. Consistorial President Heinrich Fichtner, replacing Söhngen since 1943, Bender, August Krieg, von Arnim, Paul Fahland, Paul Görs and Hans Nordmann stayed in Berlin. In 1944 the Evangelical Supreme Church Council moved partly into the premises of the Stolberg-Stolberg Consistory in Stolberg at the Harz and partly to Züllichau.

When Soviet soldiers first entered into the territory of the Ecclesiastical Province of East Prussia in late 1944, the Evangelical Church of the old-Prussian Union decided to relocate church archives from endangered East and West Prussia into central parts of Prussia, where more than 7,200 church registers were finally rescued. But with the Soviet offensives starting in January 1945 (see Vistula-Oder Offensive, January–February, with the follow-up of the East Prussian Offensive, January–April, the East Pomeranian Offensive and the Silesian Offensives, February–April) the Red Army advanced so speedily, that there was hardly a chance to rescue refugees, let alone archives of congregations in Farther Pomerania, eastern Brandenburg and from most congregations of the Silesian ecclesiastical province, as was recorded in a report about the situation in the ecclesiastical provinces (10 March 1945). By the end of the war millions of parishioners and many pastors were fleeing westwards.

=== Postwar ===
With the end of the war the tragedy of church members, the destruction of churches, and the loss of church archives had no end. The United Kingdom, the US, and the USSR had agreed in the Potsdam Agreement to absorb all the expellees from Poland proper and from the German territories newly annexed by Poland (March 1945) and by the Soviet Union. Thus an ever-growing number of parishioners was expelled. Especially all representatives of German intelligentsia – including Protestant clergy – were systematically deported to the west of the Oder-Neiße Line.

On 7 May 1945 Otto Dibelius organised the forming of a provisional church executive for the Ecclesiastical Province of the March of Brandenburg. In the Ecclesiastical Province of Saxony the Confessing Christian Lothar Kreyssig assumed the office of consistorial president. In June an overall provisional church executive, the Council of the Evangelical Church of the old-Prussian Union (German: Rat der Evangelischen Kirche der altpreußischen Union) emerged, acting until December 1948 mostly in Middle Germany, since traffic and communication between the German regions had collapsed. On 13 June 1945 the Westphalian ecclesiastical province under Praeses Karl Koch unilaterally assumed independence as Evangelical Church of Westphalia. From 1945 on the Hohenzollern provincial deanery fell under the provisional supervision by the Evangelical State Church in Württemberg. On 1 April 1950 the deanery joined that church body and thus terminated its subordination to the supervision by the Evangelical Church in the Rhineland.

On 15 July Heinrich Grüber was appointed Provost of St. Mary's and St. Nicholas' Church in Berlin and Dibelius invested him on 8 August in a ceremony in St. Mary's Church, only partially cleared from the debris.

Wurm invited representatives of all Protestant church bodies to Treysa for 31 August 1945. The representatives of the six still existing ecclesiastical provinces (March of Brandenburg, Pomerania, Rhineland, Saxony, Silesia, and Westphalia) and the central Evangelical Supreme Church Council of the Evangelical Church of the old-Prussian Union used the occasion to take fundamental decisions about the future of the Evangelical Church of the old-Prussian Union. The representatives decided to assume the independent existence of each ecclesiastical province and to reform the Evangelical Church of the old-Prussian Union into a mere umbrella organisation ("Neuordnung der Evangelischen Kirche der altpreußischen Union"). Dibelius and some Middle German representatives (the so-called Dibelians) could not assert themselves against Koch and his partisans, to maintain the Evangelical Church of the old-Prussian Union as an integrated church body.

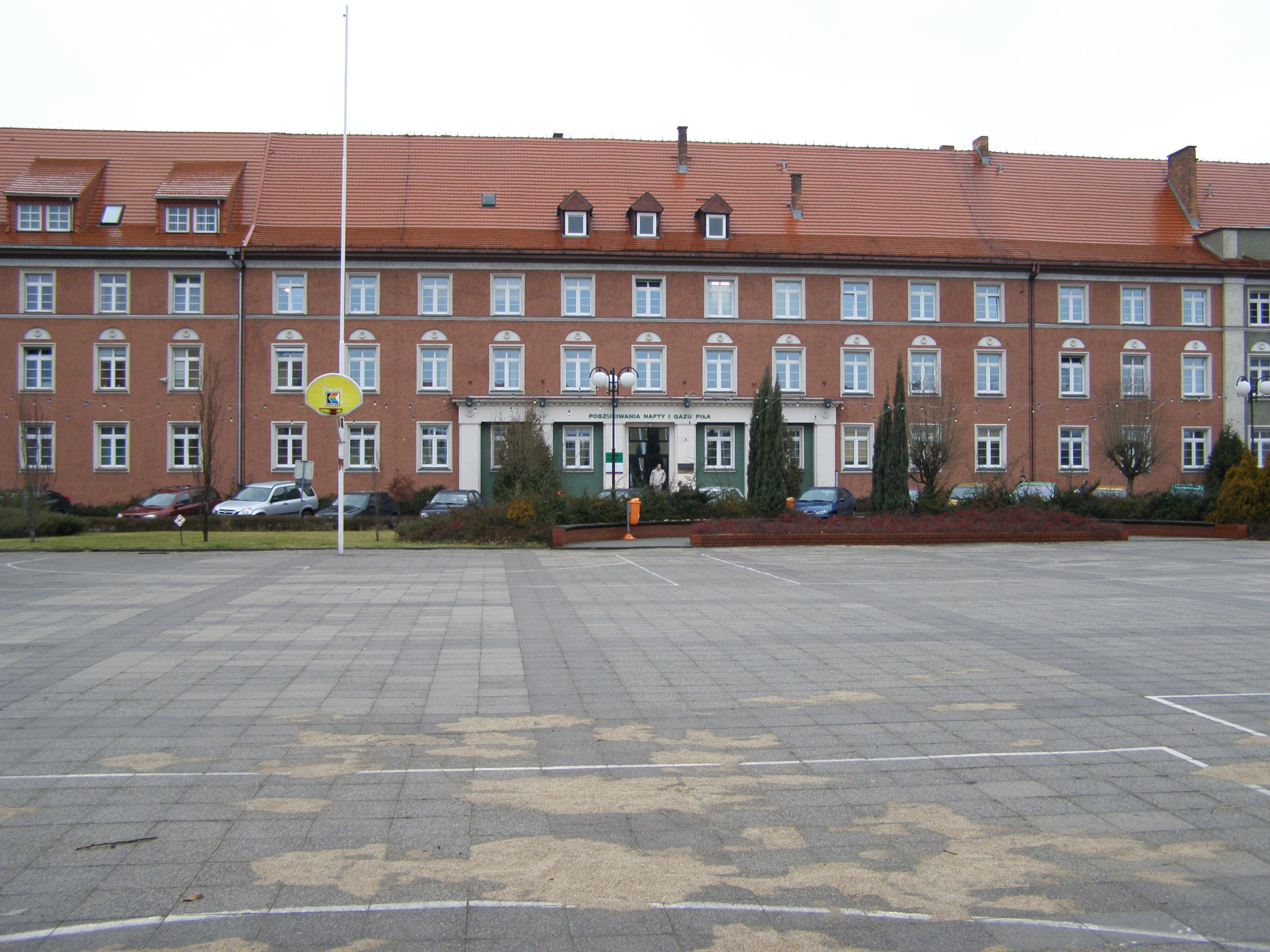
Building of the former Consistory (est. in 1923) of the Ecclesiastical Province of Posen-West Prussia in today's Piła, now the administrative centre of an oil and gas drilling company

The three ecclesiastical provinces of Danzig, East Prussia, and Posen-West Prussia, all completely located in today's Poland, today's Russian Kaliningrad Oblast and Lithuania Minor, were in the process of complete vanishing after the flight of many parishioners and pastors by the end of the war and the post-war Expulsion of Germans carried out by the Polish and Soviet governments in the years of 1945–1948. In December the lawyer and Supreme Church Councillor Erich Dalhoff issued his assessment that the newly formed provisional executive bodies on the overall and provincial levels of the Evangelical Church of the old-Prussian Union are to be regarded legitimate under the given emergency circumstances.

As to cooperation of all the Protestant church bodies in Germany strong resentments prevailed, especially among the Lutheran church bodies of Bavaria right of the river Rhine, the Hamburgian State, Hanover, Mecklenburg, the Free State of Saxony, and Thuringia, against any unification after the experiences during the Nazi reign with the German Evangelical Church. But it was decided to replace the former German Federation of Protestant Churches by the new umbrella Evangelical Church in Germany, provisionally led by the Council of the Evangelical Church in Germany, a naming borrowed from the brethren council organisation.

Until 1951 all the six still existing ecclesiastical provinces of the Evangelical Church of the old-Prussian Union assumed new church constitutions declaring their independence. In 1946 the Silesian ecclesiastical province, presided by Ernst Hornig, held its first post-war provincial synod in then already Polish Świdnica. But on 4 December 1946 Hornig was deported from Wrocław beyond the Lusatian Neisse, where he took his new seat in the German part of the divided Silesian city of Görlitz. In 1947 the Polish government also expelled the remaining members of the Silesian consistory, which temporarily could continue to officiate in Wrocław. Görlitz became the seat of the tiny territorial rest of the Silesian ecclesiastical province, constituting on 1 May 1947 as the independent Evangelical Church of Silesia.

All of the church property east of the Oder-Neiße Line was expropriated without compensation with the church buildings mostly taken over by the Roman Catholic Church in Poland, and most of the cemeteries were desecrated and devastated. Very few churches – namely in Silesia and Masuria – are owned today by Protestant congregations of the Evangelical-Augsburg Church in Poland (see e.g. Churches of Peace). In the Kaliningrad Oblast most property of the Ecclesiastical Province of East Prussia had been taken by the state and is serving profane purposes these days.

Fled and expelled parishioners from the old-Prussian eastern ecclesiastical provinces as well as fled and expelled Protestants from Czechoslovak, Hungarian, Lithuanian, Polish, or Romanian church bodies – altogether amounting to maybe 10 millions, who happened to strand in one of the remaining ecclesiastical provinces were to be integrated. The church founded a relief endowment (German: Evangelisches Hilfswerk), helping the destitute people.

The six surviving ecclesiastical provinces transformed into the following independent church bodies, to wit the Evangelical Church in Berlin-Brandenburg, the Pomeranian Evangelical Church, the Evangelical Church in the Rhineland, the Evangelical Church of the Ecclesiastical Province of Saxony, the Evangelical Church of Silesia, and the Evangelical Church of Westphalia. The Rhenish and the Westphalian synods constituted in November 1948 for the first time as state synods (German: Landessynode) of the respective, now independent church bodies.

In 1947 at a meeting of delegates of the six surviving ecclesiastical provinces they confirmed the status quo, with the Evangelical Church of the old-Prussian Union having transformed into a league of independent church bodies. In July 1948 the provisional executive of the Evangelical Church of the old-Prussian Union had to convene separately in East and West, because the Soviets blocked the interzone traffic after the introduction of the Deutsche Mark in the Bizone and the French zone of occupation.

The schism was not yet fully overcome, since only the most radical German Christians had been removed or resigned from their positions. Many neutrals, forming the majority of clergy and parishioners, and many proponents of the quite doubtable compromising policy in the times of the struggle of the churches assumed positions. It was Dibelius' policy to gain the mainstream of the parishioners. Thus the strict opposition of the Dahlemites and Barmensians continued to maintain their conventions in the old-Prussian brethren councils. On 14 January 1949 representatives of the Evangelical Church of the old-Prussian Union decided to reconcile the groups and founded a committee to develop a new church constitution. On 15 August 1949 the Evangelical Supreme Church Council, presided by Dibelius, issued the proposal of the committee for a new constitution, which would bring together the Westphalians striving for the complete unwinding of the Evangelical Church of the old-Prussian Union, the Dahlemites and Barmensians as well as the Dibelians.

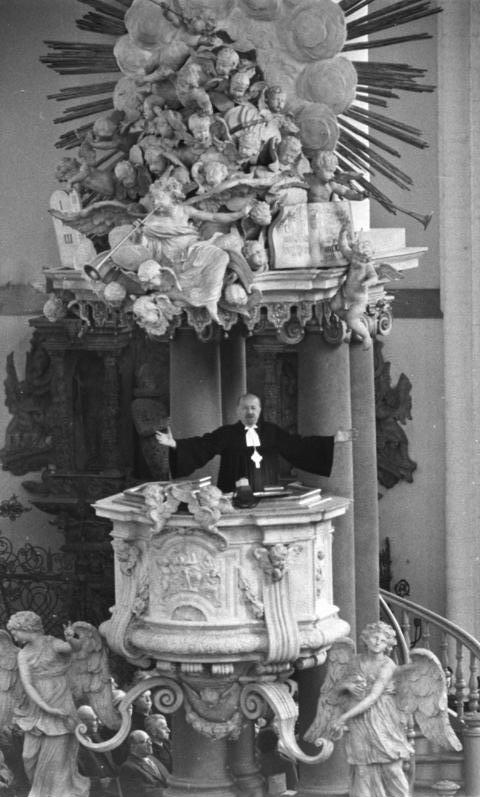
Otto Dibelius preaching from the pulpit (1703 by Andreas Schlüter) in St. Mary's Church, Berlin (East), 1959

The bulk of the mainstream parishioners shared a strong skepticism, if not even objection, against communism, so did Dibelius. So after the foundation of the German Democratic Republic (GDR) in the Soviet zone of occupation on 7 October 1949 Dibelius was often defamed in the East as propadandist of the western Konrad Adenauer government.

=== Into the 1950s ===
On 24 February 1950 the Evangelical Supreme Church Council proposed an extraordinary General Synod, which convened on 11–13 December in Berlin. The synod elected Lothar Kreyssig as chair (praeses) of the synod and voted for a new Church constitution on 13 December, and again in a second meeting on 20 February 1951. On 1 August 1951 the new constitution (German: Ordnung der Evangelischen Kirche der altpreußischen Union) took effect. It transformed the Evangelical Church of the old-Prussian Union (German: Evangelische Kirche der altpreußischen Union (ApU/EKapU)) into a mere umbrella organisation and did away with the Evangelical Supreme Church Council, replacing it by the Church Chancery (German: Kirchenkanzlei), as its administrative body. The governing body, Church Senate led by the Praeses of the General Synod (disbanded by 1933), became the Council of the Evangelical Church of the old-Prussian Union.

The heads of the Church body now bore the title President of the Council (German: Vorsitzende(r) des Rates der Evangelischen Kirche der altpreußischen Union) and led for terms of two years. The Council consisted of the presidents of the member churches, the Praeses of the General Synod, members of each member church appointed by their respective synods, the Chief of the Church Chancery, two representatives of the Reformed parishioners and two general synodals, who were not theologians. Until the appointment of the first head in 1952 President Dibelius, the former president of the Evangelical Supreme Church Council, and its other members officiated per pro as chief and members of the Church Chancery.

In 1951 the Bavarian Bishop Hans Meiser, then president of the United Evangelical Lutheran Church of Germany, criticised the continuation of the Evangelical Church of the old-Prussian Union as an umbrella, since it lacked a denominational identity, despite the membership of the Prussian Union. On 5 April of the same year Karl Steinhoff, then Minister of the Interior of the GDR, opposed the continued identity of the Evangelical Church of the old-Prussian Union, especially the use of the term "Prussian" in its name. The Evangelical Supreme Church Council replied that the term old-Prussian Union refers to a denomination, not to a state, so the name was not changed.

On 5 May 1952 the Council of the Evangelical Church of the old-Prussian Union, met for the first time and elected from its midst Heinrich Held as President of the Council. On 2 July Held met Otto Grotewohl, Minister President of the GDR, for his first official visit.

The government of the GDR continued to protest the name, so in a general synod on 12 December 1953 the synodals decided to drop the term old-Prussian from the name, though confirming that this did not mean the abandonment of the denomination of the Prussian Union. Furthermore, the synod opened the possibility of admitting non-Prussian United and uniting churches to the umbrella. The Evangelical Church of the old-Prussian Union used to be abbreviated in German as ApU or EKapU, the renamed Evangelical Church of the Union (German: Evangelische Kirche der Union) chose the abbreviation EKU.

In 1960 the synod of the EKU called on the Germans in the east not to leave the GDR. In November the same year the Evangelical State Church of Anhalt, comprising a territory which had never been a part of Prussia, joined the EKU.

Since the 1950s the GDR opposed the cross-border co-operation of the Evangelical Church of the Union. Especially after the Berlin Wall was built, the GDR hardly allowed its citizens to visit the Federal Republic of Germany and often denied Westerners entrance to the GDR. However, the GDR tolerated the cooperation to some extent because of the considerable subsidies granted by the two western member churches to the four (from 1960 on, five) eastern member churches, which allowed the GDR National Bank and later its Staatsbank to pocket the western Deutsche Marks, which were otherwise hard to earn by GDR exports to the west, while disbursing East German marks to the eastern churches at the arbitrarily fixed rate of 1:1, since GDR citizens and entities were forbidden to hold unlimited sums of western currency the western churches could not help it. Its synodals from the East and the West would meet simultaneously in Berlin (East) and Berlin (West), while messengers would keep up the communication between them. On 9 May 1967 the Evangelical Church of the Union decided a committee for the reconstruction of the Supreme Parish and Cathedral Church in East Berlin. The government of the GDR did not oppose the work of the committee due to the resulting inflow of Deutsche Marks.

On 9 April 1968 the GDR adopted its second constitution, formalising the country's transformation into a communist dictatorship. Thus the GDR government deprived the church bodies in the GDR of their status as statutory bodies (German: Körperschaft des öffentlichen Rechts) and abolished the Church tax, which automatically collected parishioners' contributions as a surcharge on the income tax. Now parishioners would have to fix the level of their contributions and to transfer them again and again on their own. This, together with the ongoing discrimination of church members which let many secede from the church, effectively eroded the financial situation of the Church bodies in the East. While in 1946 87.7% of the children in the Soviet Zone were baptised in one of the Protestant Churches the number dropped in 1950 to 86.4% of all children born in the GDR, with 80.9% in 1952, 31% (1960) and 24% (1970). The percentage of Protestant parishioners among the overall population decreased from 81.9% (1946), to 80.5% (1950), 59% (1964) and to 23% in 1990.

By its new constitution of 1968 the GDR Government demoted all churches from "Public-law Corporations" to mere "Civil Associations" and thus could force the EKU member Churches Evangelical Church of Silesia and the Pomeranian Evangelical Church to remove the terms Silesia and Pomerania from their names. The first then chose the new name Evangelical Church of the Görlitz Ecclesiastical Region, the latter Evangelical Church in Greifswald.

On 1 October 1968 the Synod of the Evangelical Church of the Union prepared for the worst and passed emergency measures establishing regional synods for East and West in the event of a forceful separation of the Union. The eastern synodal Hanfried Müller, a Stasi spy, demanded the separation of the Union. However, the majority of the synod opposed it and the Evangelical Church of the Union maintained its unity until 1972.

In July 1970 Karl Eduard Immer, the Praeses of the Evangelical Church in the Rhineland was invited for a meeting in Berlin (East) to discuss the further cross-border work of the Evangelical Church of the Union. However, when he attempted to enter East Berlin in October he was denied entrance. So in 1972 the Evangelical Church of the Union was forced to separate into two formally independent bodies, indicated by the name affixes Bereich Bundesrepublick Deutschland und Berlin West (Region/range Federal Republic of Germany and Berlin West) and Bereich Deutsche Demokratische Republik (Region/range German Democratic Republic; GDR) with East Berlin being subsumed under the GDR. The councils of the western and the eastern region met monthly in East Berlin. The GDR government was not after terminating this cooperation. The subsidies from the West continued and were still allowed for the aforementioned reasons.

With the end of the GDR dictatorship in 1989, in 1990 the Evangelical Church in Greifswald readopted its original name of Pomeranian Evangelical Church. In 1991 the two Evangelical Churches of the Union reunited. With effect of 1 January 1992 the two regions were administratively reunited. The EKU then comprised 6,119 congregations in spread over seven member churches. In 1992 the Evangelical Church of the Görlitz Ecclesiastical Region chose the new name of Evangelical Church of Silesian Upper Lusatia.

Due to the increasing irreligionism, lower birth rates since the 1970s, and few Protestant immigrants, the Protestant churches in Germany are undergoing a severe decline in parishioners and thus of parishioners' contributions, forcing member Churches to reorganise in order to spend less. For this reason, the Synod of the Evangelical Church of the Union decided in June 2002 to merge their organisation with the Union of Evangelical Churches, which took effect 1 July 2003. This is an umbrella organisation combining all independent Protestant regional united and uniting churches in Germany.

== Doctrinal sources ==
Belief and teaching were based on a number of confessions accepted by the church. These were the Augsburg Confession, the Apology of the Augsburg Confession, the Smalcaldic Articles, Luther's Large Catechism as well as his Small Catechism and the Heidelberg Catechism. Some Lutheran congregations within the Church also accepted the Formula of Concord. Whereas congregations of French Reformed tradition agreed to teach in harmony with the Gallic Confession and the Church discipline. Through the Polish annexation and expulsion of parishioners the Pomeranian Evangelical Church had lost all its united Protestant and Reformed congregations, thus having become purely Lutheran. Among its accepted confessions of faith were only Lutheran ones.

After the ecclesiastical provinces had assumed independence between 1945 and 1950 they characterised themselves differently. Berlin-Brandenburg, Saxony and Silesia conceived themselves as churches of the Lutheran Reformation, with the Saxon provincial church comprising core places of Luther's life and work (Wittenberg, Eisleben). The churches of Berlin-Brandenburg, Saxony and Silesia comprised mostly Lutheran congregations, some Reformed congregations (Silesia after the Polish annexation and expulsion of parishioners a single one) and few united Protestant congregations.

In Berlin-Brandenburg the Reformed congregations formed an own deanery (Kirchenkreis) not delineated along territorial boundaries but confessional differences. The Reformed deanery continued to exist after the merger of Berlin-Brandenburg with the church in Silesian Upper Lusatia now also including the Silesian Reformed congregation. The Evangelical Church in the Rhineland and that of Westphalia are churches united in administration according to the self-conception. Whereas many Rhenish congregations are indeed united in confession, the Westphalian church sees Lutheran and Reformed traditions as equally ranked. The Evangelical State Church of Anhalt again is a church united in confession with all its congregations being united in confession too.

== Ecclesiastical provinces of the church ==
The church was subdivided into regional ecclesiastical provinces, territorially mostly resembling the political provinces of Prussia belonging to Prussia before 1866. Each ecclesiastical province had at least one consistory, sometimes more with special competences, and at least one general superintendent, as provincial spiritual leader, sometimes more with regional competences.

== Number of parishioners ==
Parishioners of the old-Prussian Church (Pop.)
Year	Pop.	±%
1865	11,000,000	—
1890	14,900,000	+35.5%
1925	18,700,000	+25.5%
1933	19,500,000	+4.3%
1950	14,700,000	−24.6%
1990	9,262,000	−37.0%
Note: In 1940 the church absorbed congregations located in Danzig-West Prussia previously belonging to the United Evangelical Church in Poland, and all the United Evangelical Church in Polish Upper Silesia with its 17 congregations. Note: As of 1945 many parishioners died during the Soviet conquest, then again many perished in the subsequent atrocities against Germans and their expulsion from eastern Germany. About one third of the parishioners was exiled, many stranded outside the ambit of the church and thus became members in other Protestant churches. Source: See footnote

== Governors, governing bodies and chairmen of the church ==
Between 1817 and 1918 the incumbents of the Prussian throne were simultaneously Supreme Governors (summus episcopus) of the Church. Since 1850 – with the strengthening of self-rule within the church – additionally the Evangelical Supreme Ecclesiastical Council (Evangelischer Oberkirchenrat, EOK) became the administrative executive body. Its members, titled supreme consistorial councillors (Oberkonsistorialrat, [Oberkonsistorialräte, plural]) were theologians and jurists by vocation. With the end of the monarchy and the summepiscopacy in 1918 and the separation of religion and state by the Weimar constitution in 1919 the church established by its new church order (constitution) an elected governing board in 1922, called the church senate (Kirchensenat), to which the EOK, with reduced competences, became subordinate. The church senate was presided by the praeses of the general synod.

With the Nazi regime's interference causing the violation and de facto abolition of the church order, new bodies emerged such as the state bishop (Landesbischof) in 1933, deprived of his power in 1935, the state ecclesiastical committee (Landeskirchenausschuss) since 1935 (dissolved in 1937) and finally the de facto usurpation of governance by the illegitimately appointed president of the EOK since (till 1945). By the end of the war a spontaneously formed provisionally advisory board (Beirat) appointed a new president of the EOK. In 1951 the EOK was renamed into church chancery (Kirchenkanzlei), followed by renaming the church body into Evangelical Church of Union in December 1953.

=== Supreme governors (1817–1918) ===
- 1817–1840: Frederick William III of Prussia, before supreme governor of the separate Lutheran and Reformed churches since 1797
- 1840–1861: Frederick William IV of Prussia
- 1861–1888: William I of Prussia
- 1888: Frederick III of Prussia
- 1888–1918: William II of Prussia

=== Praesides of the general synod and the synod of the EKU ===
Before 1922 the praeses only presided over the legislative body of the church, the general synod, thereafter also over the church senate, the new governing body.

==== General synod (1846–1953) ====
- 1846: Daniel Amadeus Neander (*1775–1869*)
- 1847–1875: no general synods held
- 1875–1907: Wilhelm Schrader (*1817–1907*)
- 1907–1915: ?
- 1915–1933: Johann Friedrich Winckler (*1856–1943*)
- 1933–1934: Friedrich Werner (elected by the illegitimate so-called brown general synod, deposed by State Bishop Ludwig Müller on 26 January)
- 1934–1945: Friedrich Werner (reappointed by Landgericht Berlin I on 20 November, de facto deposed in 1945)
- 1945–1950: vacancy
- 1950–1970: Lothar Kreyssig (titled Praeses of the synod of the EKU since 1953)

==== Synod of the Evangelical Church of the Union (1953–1972) ====
- 1950–1970: Lothar Kreyssig
- 1970–1976: Helmut Waitz (*1910–1993*), since 1972 for the eastern region only

==== Western region (1972–1991) ====
- 1972–1976: Ernst Wilm
- 1976–1988: Christof Karzig (*1934)
- 1988–1991: Manfred Kock (*1936)

==== Eastern region (1972–1991) ====
- 1970–1976: Helmut Waitz, till 1972 for the undivided synod
- 1976–1982: Manfred Becker (*1939*)
- 1982–1988: Herbert Karpinski (*1932)
- 1988–1991: Dietrich Affeld (*1928–2007*)

==== Reunited synod (1992–2003) ====
- 1992–1994: Dietrich Affeld, later unmasked as Stasi spy IM "Dietrich"
- 1994–1998: Manfred Kock (*1936)
- 1998–2003: Nikolaus Schneider

=== Presidents of the Evangelical Supreme Ecclesiastical Council (1850–1951) ===
The Evangelical Supreme Ecclesiastical Council (Evangelischer Oberkirchenrat, EOK) was the leading executive body, and de facto the governing body between 1918 and 1922, and again between 1937 and 1951, however, then during the schism paralleled by the alternative old-Prussian state brethren council.

- 1850–1863: Rudolf von Uechtritz, administrative jurist (*1803–1863*)
- 1863–1864: Heinrich von Mühler, jurist and politician (*1813–1874*), per pro
- 1865–1872: Ludwig Emil Mathis, administrative jurist (*1797–1874*)
- 1872–1873: Wilhelm Hoffmann, theologian (*1806–1873*), per pro
- 1873–1878: Emil Herrmann, ecclesiastical lawyer and politician (*1812–1885*)
- 1878–1891: Ottomar Hermes, jurist (*1826–1893*)
- 1891–1903: Friedrich Wilhelm Barkhausen, administrative jurist (*1831–1903*)
- 1903–1919: Bodo Voigts, jurist (*1844–1920*)
- 1919–1924: Reinhard Johannes Möller, jurist (*1855–1927*)
- 1925–1933: Hermann Kapler, jurist (*1867–1941*); resigned after the church had been subjected to state control
- 1933: Ernst Stoltenhoff, theologian (*1879–1953*), per pro; deposed by the Prussian State Commissioner August Jäger
- 1933–1945: Friedrich Werner, jurist (*1897–1955*), appointed by August Jäger, later confirmed by the brown general synod; deposed in 1945
- 1945–1951: Otto Dibelius, bishop, per pro; appointed by the provisional advisory board (Beirat)

=== Chairman of the church senate (1922–1934) ===
- 1922–1933: Johann Friedrich Winckler, qua praeses of the general synod
- 1933–1934: Friedrich Werner, qua praeses of the illegitimate so-called brown general synod, deposed by State Bishop Ludwig Müller on 26 January

=== Parallel governing bodies during the Nazi reign ===
Due to the interference of the Nazi regime in the internal affairs of the old-Prussian church favorites of the regime could usurp governing positions, and lost them again when dropping into disgrace. The protagonists of the confessing old-Prussian church declared the schism to be matter of fact and formed their own governing bodies on 29 May 1934, called the State Brethren Council (Landesbruderrat) of the Evangelical Church of the Old-Prussian Union.

==== State Brethren Council (1934–1949) ====
- 1934–1936: Jakob Emil Karl Koch (*1876–1951*), chairman titled praeses
- 1936–1939?: Friedrich (Fritz) Müller (*1889–1942*, poisoned), chairman
- 1939?–1949: The brethren council was a collegiate body

==== Chairman of the church senate (1934–1951) ====
- 1934–1945: Friedrich Werner, reappointed by verdict of the Landgericht Berlin I on 20 November, de facto deposed in 1945
- 1945–1951: vacancy, church senate then renamed to Council of the Evangelical Church of the old-Prussian Union

==== State Bishop ====
On 4 August 1933 Ludwig Müller declared himself old-Prussian State Bishop (Landesbischof), after the State Commissioner for the Prussian ecclesiastical affairs, August Jäger, had conveyed him per pro its leadership. The German Christians confirmed him with their majority in the illegitimate brown general synod on 5 September 1933, by changing the church order only creating the function of state bishop. By creating the state ecclesiastical committee (Landeskirchenausschuss) for the old-Prussian church Müller lost all his governing competences, but retained the title.

- 1933–1935(1945): Ludwig Müller; deposed on 3 October 1935 by the old-Prussian state ecclesiastical committee

==== President of the state ecclesiastical committee for the old-Prussian Church ====
- 1935–1937: Karl Eger (*1864–1945*), resigned since overcoming the schism turned impossible
- 1937–1945: governance de facto wielded by Friedrich Werner

=== Council of the Evangelical Church of the (old-Prussian) Union ===
The new church order of 1 August 1951, accounting for the transformation of the integrated old-Prussian church into an umbrella, replaced the vacant church senate by the Council of the Evangelical Church of the old-Prussian Union (Rat der Evangelischen Kirche der altpreußischen Union). Also the followers of the State Brethren Council (Landesbruderrat) could be reintegrated into the church. In December 1953 the term old-Prussian was skipped from the names of the church (since: Evangelische Kirche der Union, EKU) and its bodies.

The praeses of the general synod was a member of the council, but only spiritual leaders of one of its member churches were elected chairpersons with the one exception of Kurt Scharf, who became only later bishop. Therefore, the chairperson was also called the leading bishop (Leitender Bischof) even though this title is not used for the spiritual leaders of three of the former member churches. Due to the intensifying East German obstruction of cross-border cooperation within the Evangelical Church of the Union it formed separate governing bodies for the regions of the GDR with East Berlin and West Germany with West Berlin in 1972. The bodies reunited in 1991.

==== Leading bishops and chairmen of the Council (1951–1972) ====
- 1951–1957: Heinrich Held (*1897–1957*), praeses of the Evangelical Church in the Rhineland
- 1957–1960: Kurt Scharf, then one of the provosts of the Evangelical Church in Berlin-Brandenburg
- 1960–1963: Joachim Beckmann (*1901–1987*), praeses of the Evangelical Church in the Rhineland
- 1963–1969: Ernst Wilm (*1901–1989*), praeses of the Evangelical Church of Westphalia
- 1970–1972: Hans-Joachim Fränkel (*1909–1997*), bishop of the Evangelical Church of the Görlitz Ecclesiastical Region (formerly Evangelical Church of Silesia till 1968)

==== Western region bishops (1972–1991) ====
- 1972–1975: Karl Eduard Immer (*1916–1984*), praeses of the Evangelical Church in the Rhineland
- 1975–1981: Hans Thimme (*1909–2006*), praeses of the Evangelical Church of Westphalia
- 1981–1987: Gerhard Brandt (*1921–1999*), praeses of the Evangelical Church in the Rhineland
- 1987–1991: Hans-Martin Linnemann (*1930), praeses of the Evangelical Church of Westphalia

==== Eastern region bishops (1972–1991) ====
- 1972–1976: Horst Gienke (*1930), bishop of the Evangelical Church in Greifswald (formerly Pomeranian Evangelical Church till 1968)
- 1976–1979: Werner Krusche (*1917–2009*), bishop of the Evangelical Church of the Ecclesiastical Province of Saxony
- 1979–1983: Eberhard Natho (*1932), church president of the Evangelical State Church of Anhalt
- 1984–1987: Gottfried Forck (*1923–1996*), bishop of the Evangelical Church in Berlin-Brandenburg (eastern synod)
- 1987–1989: Horst Gienke, resigned under synodal pressure after unmasking as Stasi spy IM "Orion"
- 1989–1991: Joachim Rogge (*1929–2000*), bishop of the ecclesiastical region of Görlitz

==== Reunited church bishops and chairmen (1992–2003) ====
- 1992–1993: Joachim Rogge, bishop of the Evangelical Church of Silesian Upper Lusatia (formerly Ecclesiastical Region of Görlitz till 1992); later unmasked as Stasi IM "Ferdinand"
- 1994–1996: Peter Beier (*1934–1996*), praeses of the Evangelical Church in the Rhineland
- 1996–1998: Eduard Berger (*1944), bishop of the Pomeranian Evangelical Church (formerly Evangelical Church in Greifswald till 1991)
- 1998–2000: Helge Klassohn (*1944), church president of the Evangelical State Church of Anhalt
- 2000–2003: Manfred Sorg (*1938), praeses of the Evangelical Church of Westphalia

== See also ==
- Johann Gottfried Scheibel
- Georg Philipp Eduard Huschke
- Heinrich Ernst Ferdinand Guericke
- Friedrich Julius Stahl
- August Kavel
- Johannes Andreas August Grabau
- Neo-Lutheranism
- Anglican-Evangelical Bishopric of Jerusalem
- Kirchenkampf
