= Kirchliche Hochschule Berlin =

Coordinates: 52.4234°N 13.2628°E

The Kirchliche Hochschule Berlin (Church University Berlin) was a theological university in Berlin, Germany, from 1945 to 1992, a facility of the Protestant Church in Berlin, Brandenburg and Silesian Upper Lusatia.

== History ==
The university dates back to 1935, when a Kirchliche Hochschule für reformatorische Theologie, Abteilung Dahlem (Church university for reformed theology, Dahlem) was founded, following the model of the Kirchliche Hochschule Wuppertal in Elberfeld by Hans Asmussen. The Berlin institution was founded by Martin Niemöller of the Confessing Church, after many theological faculties at state universities had been closed by the Nazi government, especially the Bonn faculty with Karl Barth.

The Kirchliche Hochschule Dahlem was banned by the Nazis in the year of its founding, but was run until 1941 illegally in Berlin-Zehlendorf. After World War II, the institution was reopened.

Professors of the Confessing Church included Hans Asmussen, Martin Albertz, Edo Osterloh, Franz Hildebrandt, Wilhelm Niesel. Among the alumni were Joachim Günther and Werner H. Schmidt.

== Journals ==
- Theologia viatorum. year book of the Kirchliche Hochschule Berlin, 1948–1982 ISSN 0342-4235
- Berliner Theologische Zeitschrift (BThZ). from 1984, ISSN 0724-6137

== Literature ==
- Aufgabe und Weg der Kirchlichen Hochschule Berlin 1939–1955. Berlin 1956.
