= Hans Asmussen =

German Evangelical and Lutheran theologian

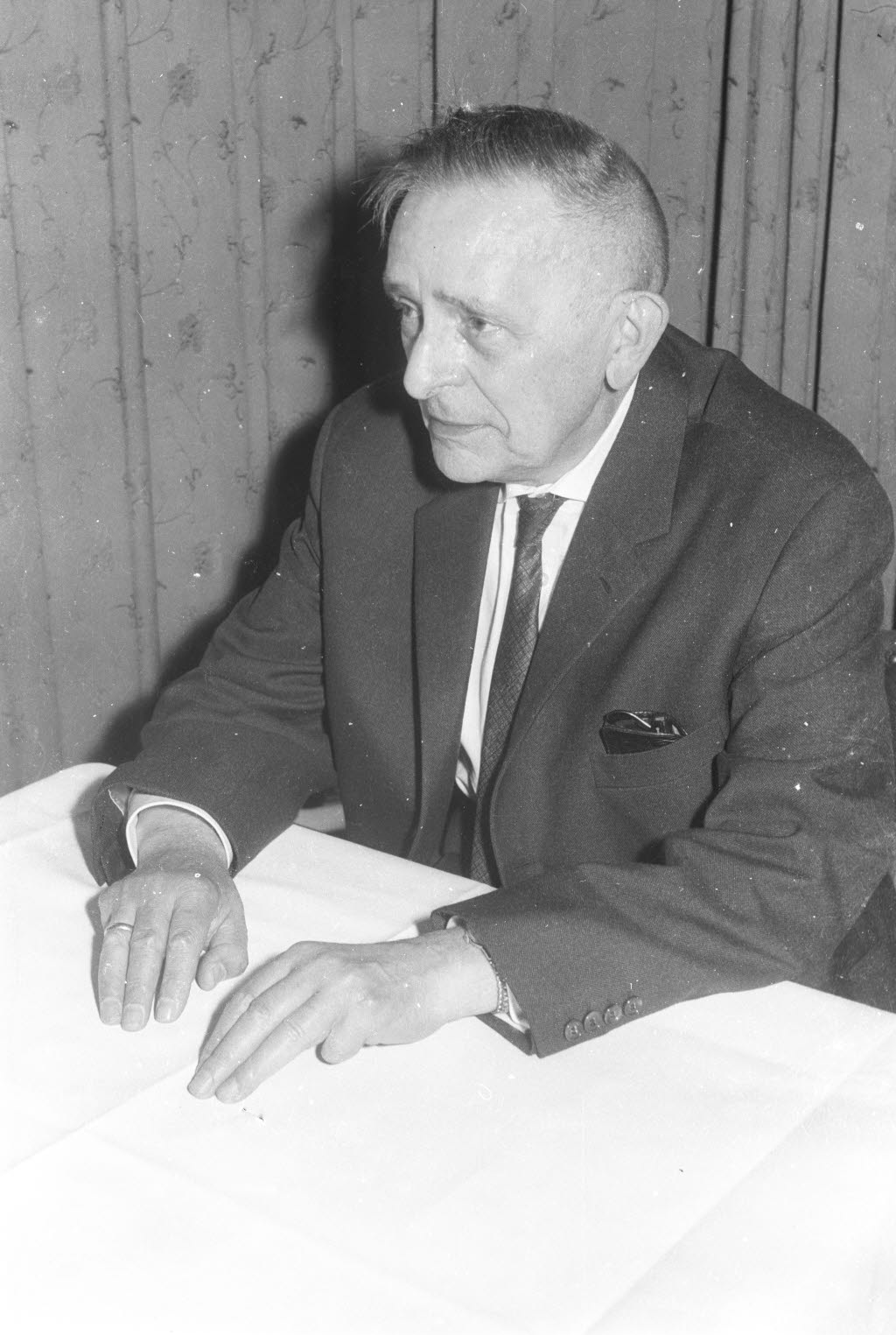
- Born: Hans Christian Asmussen; 21 August 1898; Flensburg, Schleswig-Holstein, German Empire
- Died: 30 December 1968 (aged 70); Speyer, Rheinland-Pfalz, West Germany
- Occupations: Evangelical and Lutheran theologian

Hans Christian Asmussen (born 21 August 1898 in Flensburg — died 30 December 1968 in Speyer) was a German Evangelical and Lutheran theologian.

Asmussen was a pastor in Altona, Hamburg. He was removed from office by the Nazis because of his activity in the Reich Fraternal Council of the Confessing Church. He was jailed several times before 1945. He was co-author of the protest "Word and Affirmation of Altona Pastors amid the Misery and Confusion of Public Life" (11 January 1933), which rejected a pact with National Socialism and thus became a preliminary step toward the theological declaration of the Barmen Confessional Synod. From 1945 to 1948, Asmussen presided over the Evangelical Church Chancellery, and from 1949 to 1955, he was dean (German: Propst) in Kiel; he was a promoter of ecumenical dialogue. His writings include Seelsorge (Pastoral Care; 1934) and Der Römerbrief (Letter to the Romans; 1952).

== Life ==
=== Early life ===
Asmussen, the son of a headmaster, Jes Georg Asmussen, attended high school in Flensburg. His family came from a conservative, pious roots and was influenced greatly by Pastor Emil Wacker, a charismatic revival pastor. While in high school, he studied military combat in the tactics of the First World War until 1917. It was then his eldest brother was killed in the war, and he enlisted in the army. After serving until the war's end, he went on to study Protestant theology at the University of Kiel and University of Tübingen. While at Keil he, and a number of students, formed the "League of Lutheran Brethren" in opposition to the rising popularity of liberal theology. While at Tübingen the group was known as "the archconservatives from Flensburg".

In 1921, he became vicar and later curate at the Deaconess House in Flensburg. In 1925, he took a pastorate in Albersdorf (Dithmarschen), from where he later moved in 1932 to the pastorate of the Church of St. Trinitatis in Altona. While at Albers, he worked to reform the local church to bring in a greater portion of the populace. The conservative local populace found his views appealing, as they shared a mutual distaste in the Weimar Republic. The local populace was insistent in its refusal to fly the flag of the Weimar Republic, and thus Asmussen's choice to fly old Imperial flags gained him considerable rapport.

=== Ecclesiastical resistance to Nazi Party ===
After the Altona Bloody Sunday incident on July 17, 1932 where eighteen people were killed in street fighting between the Sturmabteilung (SA) and Schutzstaffel (SS), the Prussian police, and Communist Party (KPD) Asmussen attempted to calm tempers by holding the funerals and stressing that vengeance was not the solution. However Hitler declared that the Nazi dead were "Christian martyrs", released a pamphlet titled Wöhrden's Bloody Night and Its Consequence and used the incident to spark more demonstrations. Asmussen wrote letters to the Nazi party and Hitler himself first begging for them to end the violence, later denouncing their action.

Asmussen was one of the main authors of a piece published on January 11, 1933 from Altona pastors stressing their concern with the affairs of Germany, which became known as the Altona Confession in the story. It denounced Hitler's use of the event for political gain and stated that the Church was not sided with the National Socialists, nor did it side with the Communists. It declared that no political party could claim to be ruled by the word of God. Its mission was also to bring both sides to peace and resolve their conflicts without violence. This declaration is considered a harbinger of the later and more famous Barmen Theological Declaration.

Hitler soon rose to power and intended to consolidate the German clergy into a single Church that supported the Nazi party. He established the German Christians, a group of pro-Nazi clergy who had government backing. After the victory of the German Christians in the church elections of 1933 in the Schleswig-Holstein church, Asmussen, as its avowed opponent, was suspended and sent into early retirement in 1934. Asmussen moved to Berlin and took over leading functions in September 1933 of the Pastors out Confessing Church. He belonged to the Reich Fraternal Council, and along with Karl Barth and Thomas Broad, drafted the Barmen Declaration and presented it at the first Barmer Confessional Synod of 1934 as the introduction speech.

In 1935 Asmussen founded, and was the director for, the Church University of Berlin-Dahlem which was opened on 1 November 1935 where he taught Practical Theology. However, in 1937 Heinrich Himmler decreed any training and tutelage of young theologians was prohibited for non-party clergy. Asmussen was a signatory of the Evangelical Church memorandum in the spring of 1936 and held a memorial service on 19 February 1937 at the Sachsenhausen concentration camp for the murdered chief legal advisor to the Provisional church leadership, Friedrich Weissler. In 1939, a wide-ranging speech and sermon ban was imposed on Asmussen and other non-state clergy, who were on the lists of BK for the persecuted Christians.

By 1941, Asmussen was a member of the faculty circle and the audit committee, the examinierte theological chaired by Martin Albertz candidates. In addition, he served as pastor in the Berlin parrish. In May 1941, Asmussen was arrested at Albertz, along with Günther Dehn and vicar Elisabeth Gray and sentenced on 22 December 1941 by the Berlin Special Court I to imprisonment. In 1943 Bishop Theophil Wurm brought him into the Württemberg church.

=== Theological career after 1945 ===
In 1945 he was elected as Chairman of the Council of the EKD brotherhood. When church leaders held a conference in Treysa (today Schwalm City) in August 1945, he represented the emerging Evangelical Church in Germany (EKD) and was elected to head the church office, which he built at his home in Schwäbisch Gmünd. After the surrender of Nazi Germany, he sought to publicly apologize on behalf of all Evangelical Christians for the complicity of much of the clergy to the Nazi regime. Drafted by Asmussen and Martin Niemöller, a written apology was published on 19 October 1945 in Stuttgart by the Council of the EKD.

The Declaration states in part:

Through us infinite wrong was brought over many peoples and countries. That which we often testified to in our communities, we express now in the name of the whole church: We did fight for long years in the name of Jesus Christ against the mentality that found its awful expression in the National Socialist regime of violence; but we accuse ourselves for not standing to our beliefs more courageously, for not praying more faithfully, for not believing more joyously, and for not loving more ardently.

In the following years Asmussen fell increasingly out of favor with the EKD Council, because he called for a more autonomous role of Lutheranism within the EKD Council. He had become rather critical of the church policy of Karl Barth and Niemöller and their desire to politicize the church, particularly with the Darmstadt edict of 1947. In 1948 he was relieved of his post as president of the church office and not re-elected on the Council of the EKD. From 1949 to 1955 he was a provost in Kiel.

In the 1950s Asmussen, who had also become a member of the CDU, criticized the Church's stance against nuclear weapons; a widely held view among the church. Asmussen was highly critical of the Soviet Union believing its aspirations of spreading its influence or conquering the west would entail the deprivation of rights and freedoms of Germans and Christians. He therefore believed nuclear weapons might be needed to deter this and that it was not the place of the Church to denounce the NATO government's defense efforts.

=== Late life ===
In the last decade of his life, he became increasingly involved in Ecumenism and progressively closer to the Roman Catholic Church.

Asmussen died on 30 December 1968 and was buried in the Park Cemetery Eichhof in Kiel.

== Honors ==
Asmussen received honorary doctorates from the universities of St. Andrews in 1939 and Kiel in 1949.

== Writings (selection) ==
- The Revelation and the Office. 1932, 2nd ed. 1934
- Politics and Christianity. Hanseatic Publishing Company, 1933
- Christian Teaching. 1934, 6th ed. 1946
- The Pastoral Care: Practical handbook on pastoral care and spiritual direction. 1934, 4th ed. 1937
- Why another Lutheran church? A conversation with the Augsburg Confession. 1949
- The Sacrament. 1957
- The Holy Scriptures: Six chapters on the dogma of the church. Published by "The track" Herbert Dorbandt, Berlin 1967
- Life and work. Ed.. Friedrich Hübner and others, published by the track, Berlin 1973. (Volume 3: Essays, Part 1: 1927 to 1934 in 1976.)

== Literature ==
- Rainer Hering: "Asmussen, Hans". In: Hamburg Biography, Volume 5, Wallenstein, Göttingen 2010, pp 29–30.
- Herbert Goltzen, Johann Schmidt, Henning Schroer: "Art. Asmussen, Hans". In: Theological Encyclopaedia 4 (1979), S. 259-265
- Juha Pihkala: Mystery of Christ. Church at Hans Asmussen since 1945 writings of Luther-Agricola Society A 17, Helsinki 1978 ISBN 951-9047-11-5
- Enno Konukiewitz: "Hans Asmussen, a Lutheran theologian in the church struggle". The Lutheran Church, history and figures 6 (1984) 2nd ed. Poppy, Gütersloh 1985 ISBN 3-579-00115-9
- Rudolf Halver: "Hans Asmussen - the fighter", in: Wolfgang Prehn: Time to walk the narrow way. Witnesses report from the church struggle in Schleswig-Holstein, Kiel 1985, p 187–191.
- Heidi Ditschke: Hans Asmussen. Theology and church policy until the Altona Confession. Stade 1987
- Gerhard Besier: "The debate between Karl Barth and Hans Asmussen - a paradigm for religious issues within Protestantism?" In: Berlin Theological Journal 6 (1988), 103-123
- Wolfgang Lehmann: "Hans Asmussen. A life for the Church". In 21, some color illustrations. Vandenhoeck & Ruprecht, Göttingen 1988 ISBN 3-525-55406-0
- Josef Außermair: "Concreteness and form. "Corporeality" as an essential element of a sacramental understanding of the church by the example of the ecclesiological approaches Paul Tillich, Dietrich Bonhoeffer and Hans Asmussen ecumenical aspect". Konfessionskundliche and controversial theological studies 67th Boniface, Paderborn 1997 ISBN 3-87088-875-X
- Charles Hauschildt: "Hans Asmussen (1898-1968). A Lutheran theologian in the church struggle. Memories and legacy". Church collection to Bible and Confession, Hamburg 1998
- Josef Außermair (eds.): "Hans Asmussen in the context of contemporary ecumenical theology". Studies for systematic theology and ethics 24 Münster 2001 ISBN 3-8258-4852-3
- Reinhard State: "Hans Asmussen and the German anti-Semitism". In: Protestants in German history: History Theological considerations. Evangelical Publishing House, 2004 ISBN 3-374-02175-1 Leipzig
- Roland Hosselmann: "Turning to cultic ontology in the concern of salvation. A controversial theological memory of Hans Asmussen". Studies for systematic theology and ethics 40th LIT, Münster 2004 ISBN 3-8258-7175-4
- January Long Feldt: "The minister in late Hans Asmussen". In: Lutheran Contributions 3/2011, 180–187.
- Siegfried Hermle: "Art Asmussen, Hans." In: Religion in history and the present, 4th Edition, Vol 1, 1998, Sp 843rd

== Bibliography ==
- Christian Zentner, Friedemann Bedürftig (1991). The Encyclopedia of the Third Reich. Macmillan, New York. ISBN 0-02-897502-2
