= Theophil Wurm =

German bishop (1868–1953)

Theophil Wurm

Theophil Heinrich Wurm (7 December 1868, Basel – 28 January 1953, Stuttgart) was a leader in the German Protestant Church in the early twentieth century.

Wurm was the son of a pastor. In 1900 he married Marie Bruckmann; they had three daughters and two sons.

As a young man he was a prison chaplain. Alongside his church career, Wurm was active in politics. He was a member of the Christian Social Party before World War I, and thereafter of the Citizens’ Party. He held a seat in the Württemberg State Parliament (German: Landtag) until 1920.

Wurm became a parish pastor when he was 45. He progressed in the hierarchy of the Lutheran Evangelical State Church in Württemberg and became church president in 1929, with this office being retitled into Landesbischof (bishop of the regional Protestant church) in 1933. Like many churchmen, he initially favored the Nazi regime, but its church policy soon moved him into opposition.

In September 1934 Wurm was deposed from his bishopric by Reich's bishop Ludwig Müller because of his views on church policy (including the Barmen Declaration), and was placed under house arrest. These extreme measures were eventually rescinded by Hitler in the wake of protests and the stripping of power from Müller. Wurm then held the office of bishop until 1948.

Wurm withdrew from the German Christians and aligned himself with the Confessing Church, attending its synods, but he did not advocate the more extreme policies of the church's more militant wing. Nevertheless, he was not politically apathetic and made numerous complaints to the Nazi party and the Nazi state. After the start of the war, he protested the murders of psychiatric patients under the Nazi euthanasia program. Wurm and the Catholic Bishop of Münster, Clemens August Graf von Galen, were able to lead widespread public opposition to the murder of invalids. This earned him a 1944 ban against public speaking and writing.

He associated with the resistance movements that centered on Carl Goerdeler and Ludwig Beck.

He was admired by his fellow churchmen and in 1945 (in connection with the Allies' de-nazification efforts) he was elected chairman of the Council of the newly created Protestant umbrella Evangelical Church in Germany. However, Wurm was also a staunch opponent of war crimes trials. In 1951, he was on the founding board of Stille Hilfe, a secret organization which aided relief organization for arrested, condemned, and fugitive Nazis.

He was a signatory of the October 1945 Stuttgart Declaration of Guilt.

== Publications ==
Wurm’s publications include;

- Lebensrätsel und Gottesglaube. Ein Wort zu den Nöten der Gegenwart, 1932
- Die Botschaft der Kirche, 1935
- Fünfzig Jahre im Dienste der Kirche. Predigten und Reden
- Evangelischer Glaube

== See also ==
- Karl Barth
- Dietrich Bonhoeffer
- Martin Niemöller
