= Elisabeth Schmitz =

German theologian

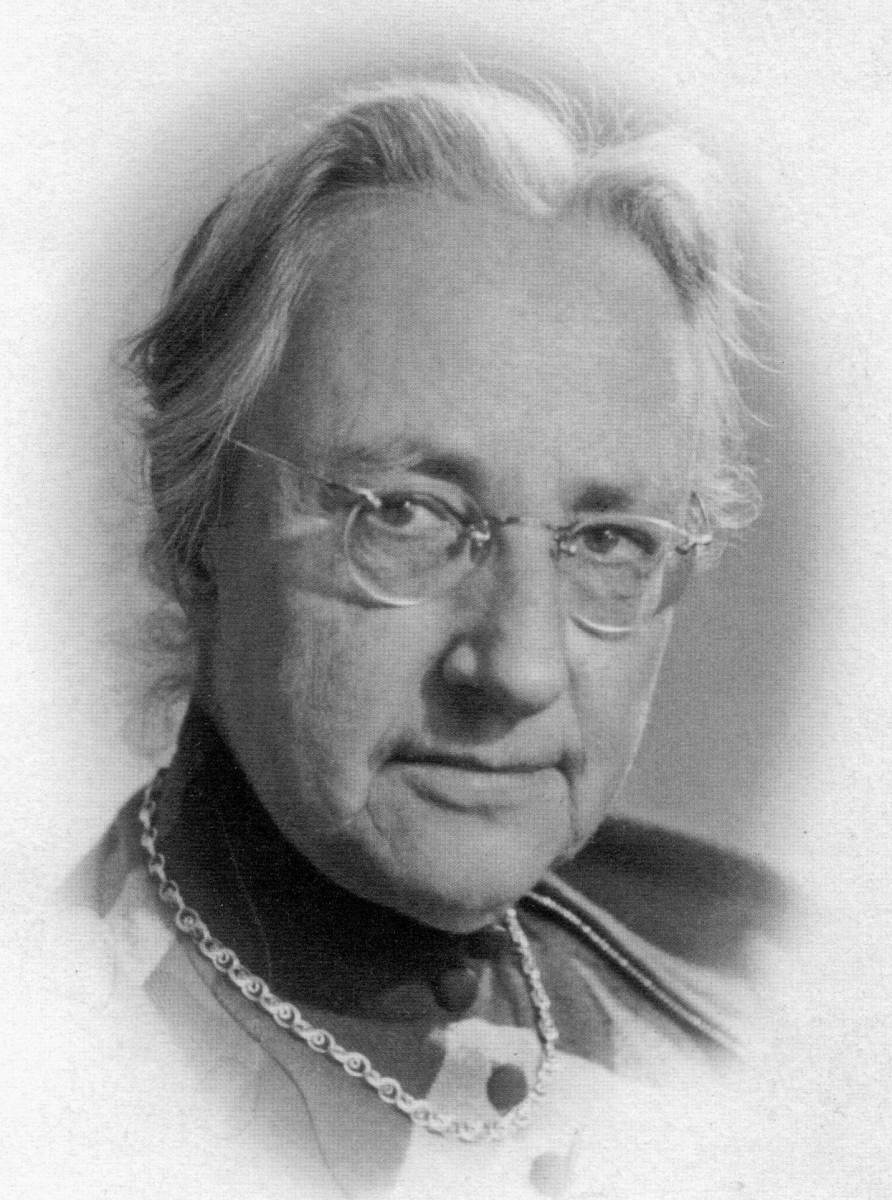
- Born: 23 August 1893; Hanau, German Empire
- Died: 10 September 1977 (aged 84); Offenbach am Main, West Germany
- Occupations: Theologian, teacher
- Notable work: "On the Situation of German Non-Aryans"

Elisabeth Schmitz (23 August 1893 – 10 September 1977) was a German Lutheran theologian, teacher, and author of "On the Situation of German Non-Aryans", a memorandum that attempted to persuade those in the Confessing Church to stand against the persecution of Jews in 1930s Germany. She also sheltered Jews and was granted the title of "Righteous Among the Nations" in 2011 by the Commission of Yad Vashem.

== Early life and education ==
Elisabeth Schmitz was born in Hanau, Germany, on 23 August 1893, to August and Clara Marie (née Bach) Schmitz. She had two older sisters. Her father was a teacher at the local high school (Hohe Landesschule), She attended Schillerschule in nearby Frankfurt.

Schmitz graduated in 1914 and her strong academic performance allowed her to pursue further education, first at University of Bonn and then, in 1915, at the (now-named) Humboldt University of Berlin. She studied history, German, and theology and completed a dissertation on Edwin von Manteuffel, a Prussian field marshal, in 1920. Her most significant teachers included historian Friedrich Meinecke and the liberal theologian Adolf von Harnack, and she maintained close ties with both men and their families. She was probably the first woman to be included in von Harnack's "Church History Seminar", an elite group that also included Karl Barth and Dietrich Bonhoeffer.

Schmitz graduated and passed her first state examination in 1921. She then completed a teacher preparation program as well as additional academic work in theology, demonstrating proficiency by passing her second state examination. In a memorial speech on the 120th anniversary of Schmitz's birth, Margot Käßmann described her as "among the first generation of women to be particularly well educated," and asserted that she and colleagues such as Carola Barth, Elisabet von Harnack and Martha Kassel, "took advantage of this fact to express their views with vigor."

== Career ==
Schmitz began teaching at secondary schools for girls in 1923 in Berlin on short-term contracts for six years. In 1929, she was hired on a permanent contract at the Luisen school. Hitler's rise to power and the resulting introduction of Nazi ideology into the school curriculum concerned her. Her unwillingness to embrace this ideology did not escape the notice of her superiors and she was transferred to Berlin-Lankwitz as a disciplinary measure in 1935. Her unwillingness to incorporate this ideology into her teaching led her to resign, requesting an immediate leave of absence and a voluntary early retirement. She did so via a letter dated 31 December 1938 that stated, "It has become increasingly doubtful to me whether I can offer instruction ... in the way that the National Socialist state expects and requires of me ... I have finally come to the conviction that this is not the case." The events of Kristallnacht had troubled her greatly and she later wrote of her decision to resign, "I decided to give up school service and no longer be a civil servant of a government that permitted the synagogues to be set afire." Victoria Barnett of the United States Holocaust Memorial Museum describes this as "a remarkable act of integrity and courage." Her early retirement took effect on 1 April 1939.

After the war, she resumed her teaching career at the Karl Rehbein School in Hanau.

== Religious convictions and activism ==
In 1933, Schmitz worked to persuade Friedrich von Bodelschwingh to speak out about the persecution of the Jews, which he declined to do. Also in 1933, she took in Martha Kassel, a medical doctor who had converted from Judaism to Protestantism but who nonetheless lost her medical practice. Kassel shared an apartment with Schmitz until shortly before her own emigration in 1938.

Schmitz was a member of Helmut Gollwitzer's "Dogmatic Study Circle". Gollwitzer had completed his dissertation under the direction of theologian Karl Barth and, from 1933 to 1936, Schmitz conducted a lengthy unsuccessful correspondence with Barth in the hope of persuading him to adopt a public stance against the Nazi treatment of the Jews in Germany. The independence of the Church was of greater concern to him than the treatment of the Jews.

A devout Protestant, in 1934 Schmitz decided to join the Confessing Church [Bekennende Kirche], a movement that opposed Nazi efforts to unite all German Protestant churches into a single state-sponsored and pro-Nazi church. She signed a "Red Card" joining the Confessing Church in the Kaiser Wilhelm Memorial parish led by Pastor Gerhard Jacobi.

Schmitz continued to argue her case that for the Protestant Church to remain silent in the face of the oppression of Jews was a deep violation of its integrity. In 1935, she wrote a 24-page memorandum, "On the Situation of German Non-Aryans." It was directed at Confessing Church leaders who were to hold a synod in Berlin in 1935. She made 200 copies and hand-distributed them to leaders including Martin Niemöller, Dietrich Bonhoeffer and Karl Barth. In it, she identified something that she believed should be a vital concern to the Protestant Church. "The Germans have a new god, which is race." Her memorandum also stated, "For the past two and a half years a severe persecution has been inflicted on a portion of our people because of their racial origin, including a portion of our own parish membership. The victims of this persecution have suffered dreadful distress both outwardly and inwardly but this is not widely known, which makes the guilt of the German people all the more reprehensible." She also wrote, "After all, for the church, this is not about a tragedy taking place, but rather about our nation’s sin and, since we are members of this nation and accountable before God for this nation of ours, about our sin." Acknowledging the peril that denouncing the Nationalist Socialists would bring, Schmitz wrote, "And if, in some cases, the Church cannot do anything for fear of its utter destruction, why does not she at least know about her guilt? Why does not she pray for those who suffer this unjustified oppression and persecution? Why are there no intercessory services?"

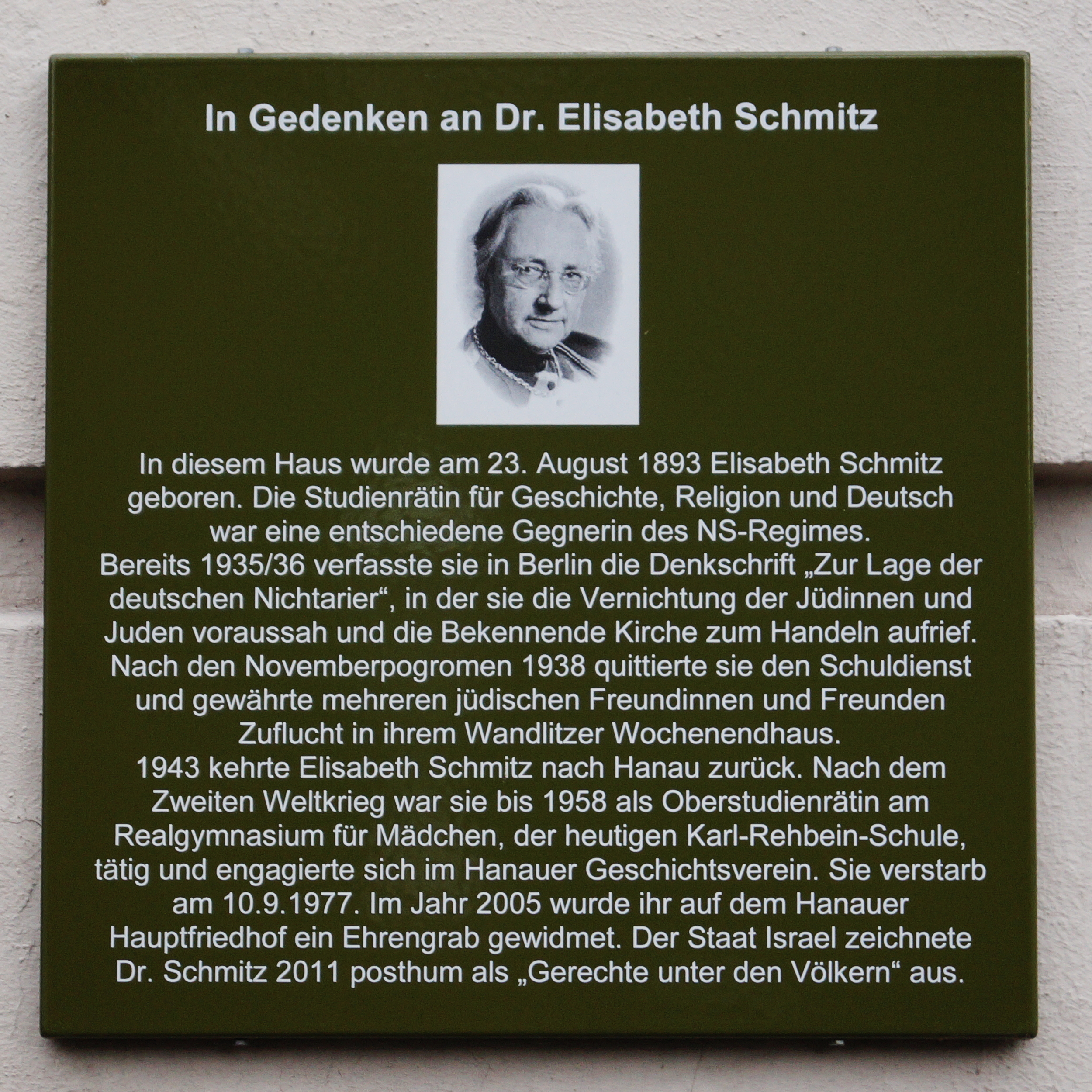
Memorial plaque at the home in Hanau where Elisabeth Schmitz was born and where she lived after her Berlin apartment was destroyed.

Schmitz hid a number of Jewish people in her apartment in Berlin. After her apartment was destroyed by bombing, she returned to Hanau and continued to support Jews with food and money.

== Authorship of "On the Situation of German Non-Aryans" ==
The memorandum entitled "On the Situation of German Non-Aryans" was written anonymously and for many years was attributed to another member of the Confessing Church, Marga Meusel, a Berlin church social worker. Meusel had written a memorandum on the duties of the Confessing Church to Protestant non-Aryans. Because both memoranda were archived together in a single file folder in the Günther Harder collection of Kirchenkampf documents in the Berlin Evangelisches Zentralarchiv, one with the attribution to Meusel and the other with no claimed authorship, historians concluded that both were written by Meusel. Probst Wilhelm Wibbeling had signed an affidavit in 1947 attesting that Elisabeth Schmitz was the author, but that affidavit was retained by Schmitz and was not included in that file folder. The correct attribution was eventually made by a retired pastor and former student of Schmitz, Dietgard Meyer, in 1999. Meyer was one of three former students whom Schmitz regarded as daughters and had received Schmitz's briefcase with the document and affidavit after Schmitz died. A video, Elisabeth of Berlin, created by Steven D. Martin for the 70th anniversary of Kristallnacht, describes the events.

While the similarity of the arguments made by Meusel and Schmitz may have led to the two memoranda being archived together, Schmitz's argument went much further. Schmitz saw the Church's responsibility to witness to injustice to be much wider than just injustice done to its own converts. As Margot Käßmann summarized in her memorial speech, "For her, it wasn’t just a question of the Church’s freedom to witness, as Karl Barth assumed, or about the fate of the baptized Jews, which so concerned Marga Meusel. She was much more concerned about the fate of the Church as Church if it was not prepared to stand up for the rights of those being maltreated."

== Legacy ==
During the postwar years, Schmitz lived in Hanau and was active in the local community but was not well known internationally. She assembled documentation of her rescue work and secured the affidavit from Wibbeling, but did not publicize her own efforts. When she gave a speech in Hanau on 7 September 1950 at a ceremony commemorating the victims of fascism and the war, she urged participants to remember the war years accurately. Failure to do so would have not only political implications but consequences for personal integrity, "Otherwise we would be defrauding ourselves of our human dignity." Although she cited others who had been in the resistance, she did not mention her own work.

She died on 10 September 1977, and only seven people attended her funeral. The low number of attendees has been cited as evidence of her obscurity, but may also be due to the funeral announcement appearing after the funeral, and apart from two unmarried sisters, Schmitz had few living relatives. Only after her authorship of "On the Situation of German Non-Aryans" was established did she receive greater prominence. Victoria Barnett, of the United States Holocaust Memorial Museum, sees in that a disturbing question about how historical narratives are created. She praises Manfred Gailus for addressing this question in his biography of Schmitz. "Indeed, one of the most fascinating aspects of this biography is its dual narrative, which combines the story of a remarkably courageous and self-effacing woman with what Gailus calls the "Erinnerungskultur"—the culture in which the narratives of memory in postwar Germany distorted the truth and obscured those individuals who had actually spoken it during the Nazi era." Barnett goes on to say that the "emergence of [Schmitz's] story and the correction of the historical record—could stand alone as studies in the creation of historical narrative."

Bishop Kenneth Carder of Duke University's Divinity School said: "This story teaches us that academic theology gives us the tools to participate in the great debates of our time, which demand great minds and courageous spirits to engage them."

== Honours ==
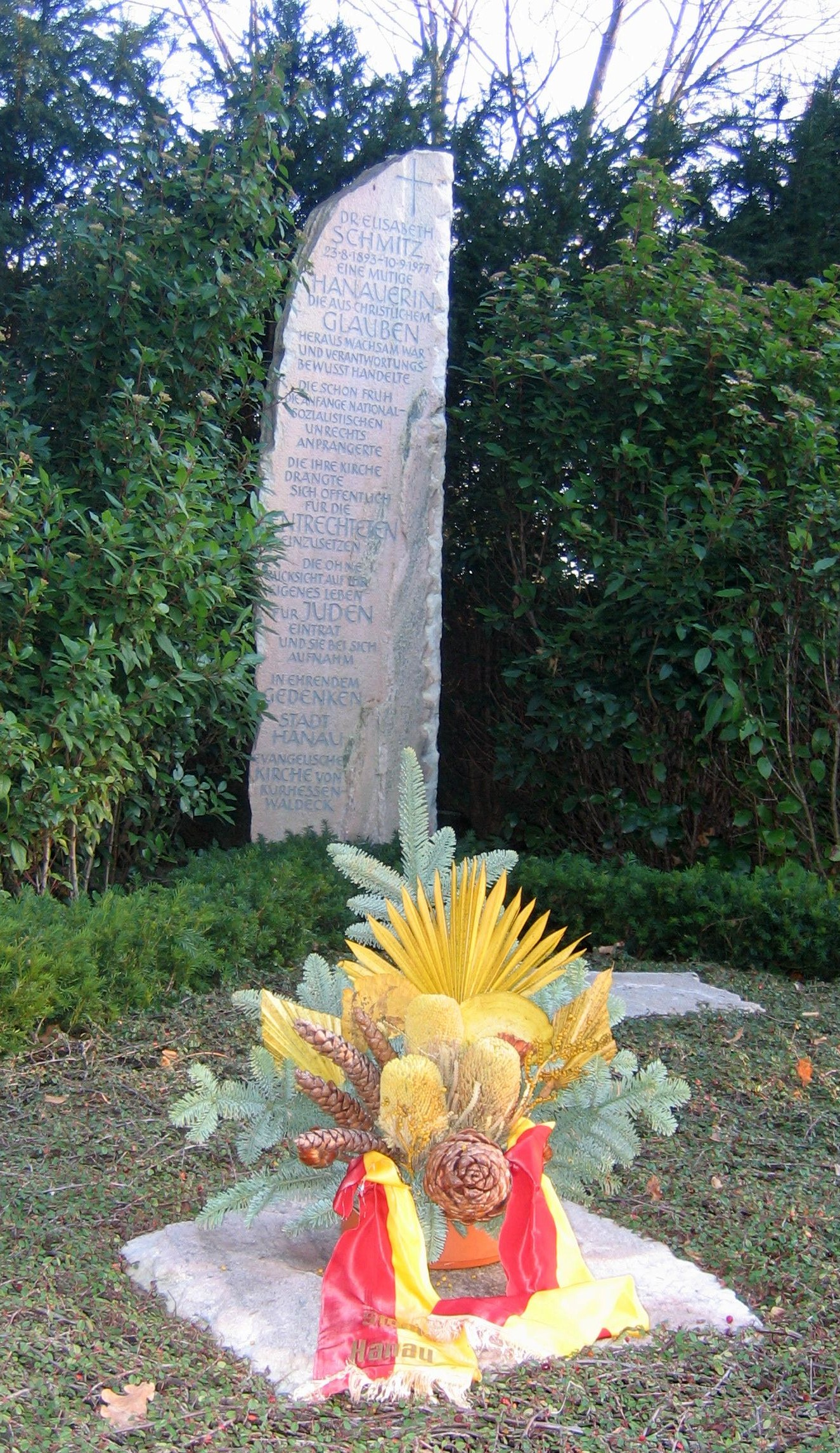
Memorial stone at Schmitz's grave

The Evangelical Church of Hesse Electorate-Waldeck and the city of Hanau erected a memorial stone at Schmitz's grave in 2005 (see photograph, right)

For the 30th anniversary of Schmitz's death, Manfred Gailus organized a 2007 conference in Berlin on Schmitz's life and work. Papers from this conference were published as Elisabeth Schmitz und ihre Denkschrift gegen die Judenverfolgung. Konturen einer vergessenen Biografie (1893–1977). The translation reads "Elisabeth Schmitz and her memorandum against the persecution of the Jews. Outlines of a forgotten biography."

Schmitz was the subject of a documentary for the 70th anniversary of Kristallnacht in 2008.

On 16 August 2011, Yad Vashem recognized Schmitz as "Righteous Among the Nations".

The German Resistance Memorial Center includes Schmitz's biography.

== Works ==
- Edwin von Manteuffel als Quelle zur Geschichte Friedrich Wilhelms IV, OCLC 20772729
