= Stuttgart declaration =

Stuttgart declaration may refer to:

- The Stuttgart Declaration of Guilt issued by the Evangelical Church in Germany on 19 October 1945
- The Solemn Declaration on European Union adopted in Stuttgart by the member states of the European Communities on 19 June 1983
