= Evangelical Theology Student Council =

German student society

The Evangelical Theology Student Council (German: „Studierendenrat Evangelische Theologie“) or SETh, is a German student advisory board which represents the interests of all Protestant theology students throughout Germany. More than 40 member organisations, consisting of student representatives at state and clerical universities, as well as student convents of Protestant Churches, belong to the SETh.

== Organisation and work ==
The highest organ of the SETh is the three times annually plenary meeting which assembles delegates of all member organisations, residing at places provided by varying student boards within the SETh. Subjects of the plenary meetings are, among others, education and church politics in Germany.

The SETh maintains relations to the Protestant Church in Germany (German: Evangelische Kirche in Deutschland), the assembly of the Evangelical Theological Faculties in Germany (German: Evangelisch-Theologischer Fakultätentag), the Standing Conference of the Ministers of Education and Cultural Affairs of the German federal states (German: Kultusminsterkonferenz), and other related organisations.

== See also ==
- Christianity in Germany
