= Edmund Hildebrandt =

German art historian (1872–1939)

- Born: 29 April 1872; Berlin, Germany
- Died: 13 January 1939 (aged 66)
- Occupation: Art historian
- Spouse: Ottilie Schlesinger (m. 1907)
- Children: 1
- Parent(s): Georg Franz Hildebrandt; Theone Wolkoff

Edmund Hildebrandt (29 April 1872 – 13 January 1939) was a German art historian.

Hildebrandt was born in Berlin to businessman Georg Franz Hildebrandt (1843–1910) and Theone Hildebrandt née Wolkoff (1839–1901). In 1907 he married teacher Ottilie Schlesinger (1872–1939) in a civil ceremony, despite Ottilie being from a well known Jewish merchant family. The couple had a son in 1909, Franz, and moved into the affluent Charlottenburg area of Berlin. Hildebrandt considered himself a pantheist, and his son Franz Hildebrandt later became a renowned theologian and pastor. Hildebrandt suffered from agoraphobia, which manifested itself in his choice of small auditoriums for lectures.

Hildebrandt received his doctorate degree in 1898 in Berlin, with his thesis on German sculpture. From 1908 he was a lecturer of art history, and from 1921 held the position of associate professor at the Humboldt University of Berlin. His main research interest was in Italian Renaissance and Baroque, and he wrote several books on the topic. He left his position in 1937 after failing to get the aryan certificate required by the rising National Socialist regime.

== Publications ==
- Friedrich Tieck: ein Beitrag zur deutschen Kunstgeschichte im Zeitalter Goethes und der Romantik (1906)
- Leben, Werke und Schriften des Bildhauers E.-M. Falconet, 1716-1791 (1908)
- Michelangelo; eine einführung in das verständnis seiner werke (1913)
- Antoine Watteau (1922)
- Die Malerei und Plastik des achtzehnten Jahrhunderts in Frankreich, Deutschland und England (1924)
- Leonardo da Vinci, der Künstler und sein Werk (1927)
