= Franz Hildebrandt =

German-born theologian

Franz Hildebrandt (February 20, 1909, in Berlin – November 25, 1985, in Edinburgh) was a German-born Lutheran, and later Methodist, pastor and theologian, forced into exile during World War II, and subsequently active in the United Kingdom and the USA.

== Life ==
Hildebrandt was the son of the art professor Edmund Hildebrandt (1872–1939) and his wife Ottilie, née Schlesinger (1872–1952). He studied theology in Berlin, Marburg, and Tübingen (1926–1930). During his time in Berlin, he became a close friend of Dietrich Bonhoeffer. In 1930, he was awarded a licentiate (comparable to a Ph.D.) by the University of Berlin; his first book (EST: Das Lutherische Prinzip) was based on his doctoral dissertation.

Hildebrandt subsequently served for the Evangelical Church of the old-Prussian Union his probationary time (Vikariat) in Dobrilugk and at the Kirche zum Heilsbronnen in Schöneberg (a locality of Berlin), and his first posting as an assistant pastor in Kleinmachnow; he was ordained as a pastor in Berlin on June 18, 1933. Since his mother was of Jewish descent, he was affected by the introduction of the so-called Aryan Paragraph in some of the Protestant Churches in Germany after the Nazis came to power in 1933. Hildebrandt resigned from his post as a sign of protest against this church measure and left Germany to join his friend, Dietrich Bonhoeffer, who was pastor to the German congregation in London at the time.

He returned to Germany after three months, having been asked by Pastor Martin Niemöller to help him build up the Pfarrernotbund, an organisation set up to help pastors affected by the infamous Arierparagraph. Shortly after Niemöller's arrest and subsequent detention until the end of World War II, Hildebrandt was himself arrested. Friends managed to procure his release, and he left once again for England, now in permanent exile.

In subsequent years, Hildebrandt helped build up the German-speaking Protestant congregation in Cambridge, and worked for a number of church-related projects, including German-language broadcasts on the BBC. At the beginning of the war, he was interned for several months, but was released upon the intervention of his friend, Bishop George Bell of Chichester. Bell had a close relationship to both Bonhoeffer and Hildebrandt (he referred to them as 'my two boys').

In spite of his close relationship with Bell, Hildebrandt could not bring himself to join the Church of England, and become a Priest within that church, since that would have required renewed ordination by an Anglican bishop – something that Hildebrandt could not accept since it would have implicitly declared his ordination in Germany as invalid.

Hildebrandt subsequently associated more and more closely with Methodism, and eventually became a minister in that church. He began to study the theological roots of Methodism in the work of John Wesley, and developed a theological perspective on Wesley (and Methodism in general) as a development of sound Reformation theology. He started work as a Methodist pastor in Romsey Town, south of Cambridge (1946), and later in Edinburgh (1951–1953).

Hildebrandt married Nancy Hope Wright in 1943; the couple had three children; David, Ruth and Esther.

Having made every effort for a number of years to find an academic post in England, including a further doctorate at the University of Cambridge (1941), Hildebrandt was eventually called to a teaching position at Drew University, a Methodist university in the USA, where he taught Biblical Theology from 1953 to 1967. During this time, he was asked to represent the World Methodist Council as an observer at the Second Vatican Council. He also received an honorary doctorate from the Kirchliche Hochschule Berlin during this period (1960).

Returning to Scotland in 1968, Hildebrandt soon left the Methodist Church as a result of then current union talks with the Church of England, which would have required him once again to submit to renewed ordination. He joined the (Presbyterian) Church of Scotland, and was an active pastor and hospital chaplain in Edinburgh until he died in 1985. He was survived by his wife and three children. Nancy died on 12 July 2008, aged 89. David died on 16 June 2002.

== Theology ==
Hildebrandt became well known in Methodist circles on account of his work on the theology and hymns of John and Charles Wesley. In contrast to Eberhard Bethge, Bonhoeffer's closest friend from later years, Hildebrandt deliberately eschewed the debate about Bonhoeffer's theology that ensued from the 1950s onwards.

== Publications ==
- Franz Hildebrandt, Est: Das Lutherische Prinzip. Göttingen: Vandenhoeck & Ruprecht, 1931.
- Dietrich Bonhoeffer & Franz Hildebrandt, Glaubst du, so hast du: Versuch eines Lutherischen Katechismus (1932). Later published in: Dietrich Bonhoeffer, Gesammelte Schriften, Volume 3, Munich: Kaiser, 1966, pp. 248–257.
- [anonymous] Martin Niemöller und sein Bekenntnis. Zollikon: Verlag der Evangelischen Buchhandlung, 1938; English translation: Pastor Niemoller and his Creed. London 1939.
- Franz Hildebrandt, Theologie für Refugees: Ein Kapitel Paul Gerhardt. Issued by the Church of England Committee for "Non-Aryan" Christians. London: The Finsbury Press, 1940.
- Franz Hildebrandt (ed.), 'And other Pastors of thy Flock': A German tribute to the Bishop of Chichester, Cambridge: Cambridge University Press, 1942.
- Franz Hildebrandt, Melanchthon: Alien or Ally? Cambridge: Cambridge University Press, 1946.
- Franz Hildebrandt, From Luther to Wesley. London: Lutterworth Press, 1951.
- Franz Hildebrandt, Christianity according to the Wesleys: the Harris Franklin Rall lectures, 1954, delivered at Garrett Biblical Institute, Evanston, Illinois. London: Epworth Press 1956; Grand Rapids: Baker, 1996.
- Franz Hildebrandt (ed.), Wesley Hymnbook. Kansas City 1963.
- Franz Hildebrandt, I offered Christ: a Protestant study of the Mass. London: Epworth Press, 1967.
- Franz Hildebrandt and Oliver A. Beckerlegge (eds.), A Collection of Hymns for the use of the People called Methodists. (The Works of John Wesley, vol. 7), Oxford: Clarendon Press 1983; Nashville: Abingdon Press 1991.

== Audio ==
- Dr. Franz Hildebrandt and Methodist hymns conducted by A.G. Dreisbach (with Denville Methodist Episcopal Church Choir). English Sound Recording: Music: Hymns: LP recording: 33 1/3 rpm; 12 in., Madison, New Jersey 1959.
