= Evangelical Church in Germany =

Group of Protestant churches in Germany

- Evangelische Kirche in Deutschland
- Type: United church
- Classification: Protestant
- Orientation: Lutheran; Reformed
- Polity: Episcopal; Presbyterian; Congregationalist
- Chair of the Council: Kirsten Fehrs
- Associations: World Council of Churches; Conference of European Churches; Communion of Protestant Churches in Europe
- Region: Germany
- Origin: 1948; 78 years ago
- Members: 2025 EKD data: 17.4 million
- Other name: Protestant Church in Germany
- Official website: ekd.de/en/index

The Evangelical Church in Germany (German: Evangelische Kirche in Deutschland, EKD) is a federation of twenty Lutheran, Reformed, and United Protestant regional churches in Germany, collectively encompassing the vast majority of the country's Protestants. In English, it uses the name Protestant Church in Germany. In 2025, the EKD had a membership of 17.4 million members, or 20.8% of the German population. It constitutes one of the largest Protestant bodies in the world. Church offices managing the federation are located in Herrenhausen, Hanover, Lower Saxony. Many of its members consider themselves Lutherans.

Map with traditionally Lutheran states in red and Catholic states in green.

Historically, the first formal attempt to unify German Protestantism occurred during the Weimar Republic era in the form of the German Protestant Church Confederation, which existed from 1922 until 1933. Earlier, there had been successful royal efforts at unity in various German states, beginning with Prussia and several minor German states (e.g. Duchy of Nassau) in 1817. These unions resulted in the first united and uniting churches, a new development within Protestantism which later spread to other parts of the world. When Adolf Hitler came to power in 1933, his administration tried to reorganize the old confederation into a unified German Evangelical Church as Hitler wanted to use a single Protestant church to further his own ambitions. However, a division emerged between the Reichskirche, led by the pro-government German Christians, and the Confessing Church, which opposed state control of the church. Other Protestant churches aligned themselves with one of these groups, or stayed neutral in this church strife. The postwar church council issued the Stuttgart Declaration of Guilt on 19 October 1945, confessing guilt and declaring remorse for indifference and inaction of German Protestants in the face of atrocities committed by Hitler's regime. In 1948, the Protestant Church in Germany was organized in the aftermath of World War II to function as a new umbrella organization for German Protestant churches. As a result of tensions between West and East Germany, the regional churches in East Germany broke away from the EKD in 1969. In 1991, following German reunification, the East German churches re-joined the EKD.

The member churches (Gliedkirchen), while being independent and having their own theological and formal organisation, share full altar and pulpit fellowship, and are united in the EKD synod, but they act as individual members of the World Council of Churches (WCC) and the Communion of Protestant Churches in Europe (CPCE). Boundaries of EKD churches within Germany partially resemble those of the states of the Holy Roman Empire and successor forms of German statehood (to the most part 1815 borders), due to the historically close relationship between individual German states and churches. As for church governance, the Lutheran churches typically practise an episcopal polity, while the Reformed and the United ones a mixture of presbyterian and congregationalist polities. Most member churches are led by a (state) bishop. Only one member church, the Evangelical Reformed Church, is not restricted to a certain territory. In some ways, the other member churches resemble dioceses of the Catholic, Scandinavian Lutheran and Anglican churches, from an organisational point of view.

== Name ==
Etymologically, the German word evangelisch means "of the Gospel", denoting a Reformation emphasis on sola scriptura, "by scripture alone". Martin Luther encouraged the use of this term alongside Christian.

The German term evangelisch corresponds to the broad English category of Protestant rather than to the narrower term evangelical, a subset of Protestantism distinct from mainline Protestantism. Accordingly, the Church uses the name Protestant Church in Germany in English.

== History ==
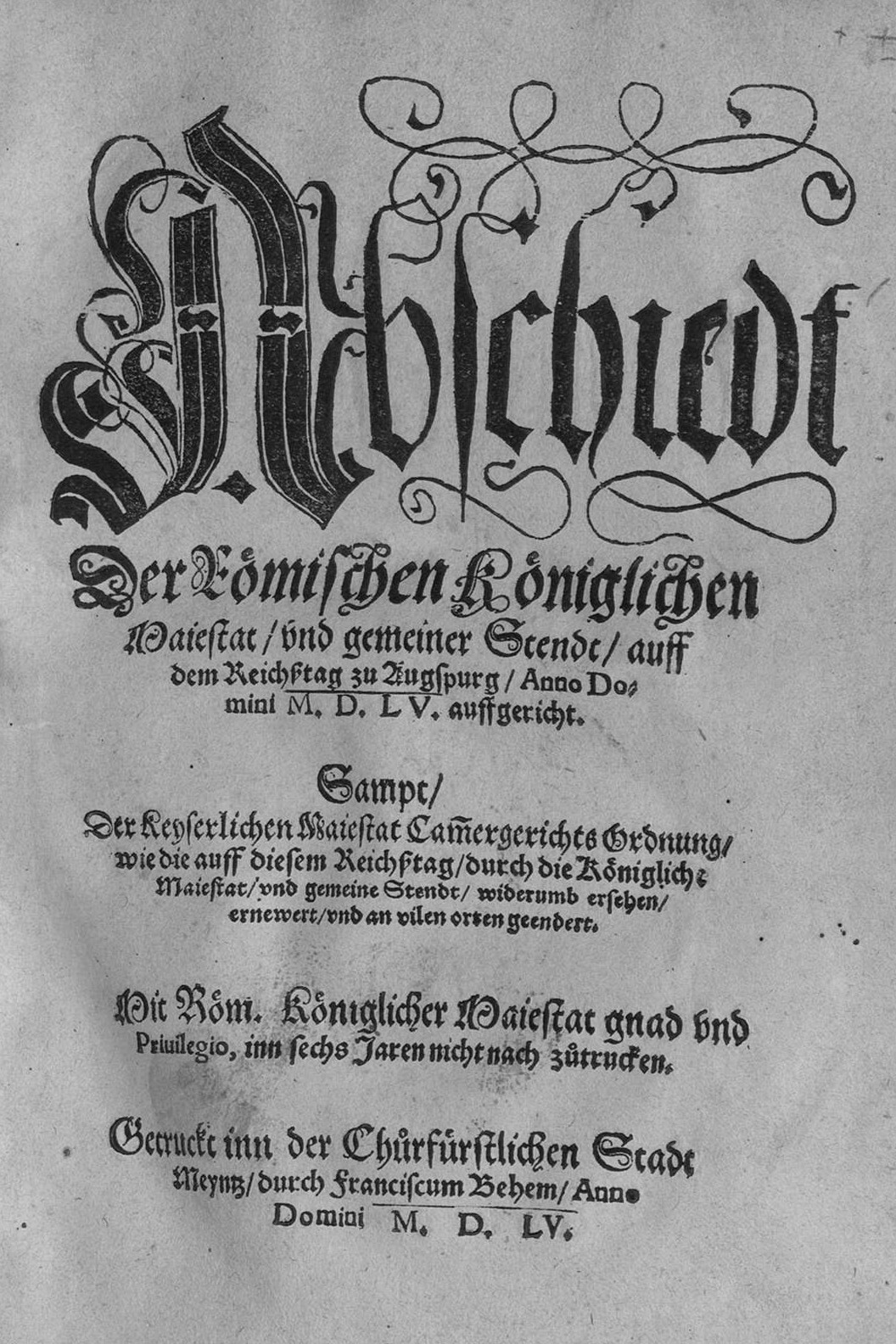
Front page of the Peace of Augsburg, which laid the legal groundwork for two co-existing religious confessions (Catholicism and Lutheranism) in the German-speaking states of the Holy Roman Empire.

From the Peace of Augsburg in 1555 to the end of the First World War and the collapse of the German Empire, some Protestant churches were state churches. Each Landeskirche (state or regional church) was the official church of one of the states of Germany, while the respective ruler was the church's formal head (e.g. the King of Prussia headed the Evangelical Church of Prussia's older Provinces as supreme governor), similar to the British monarch's role as the Supreme Governor of the Church of England.

This changed somewhat with growing religious freedom in the 19th century, especially in the republican states of Bremen, Frankfurt (1857), Lübeck, and Hamburg (1860). The greatest change came after the German revolution of 1918–1919, with the formation of the Weimar Republic and the abdication of the princes of the German states. The system of state churches disappeared with the Weimar Constitution (1919), which brought about disestablishment by the separation of church and state, and there was a desire for the Protestant churches to merge. In fact, a merger was permanently under discussion but never materialised due to strong regional self-confidence and traditions as well as the denominational fragmentation into Lutheran, Reformed, and United and uniting churches.

During the Revolution, when the old church governments lost power, the People's Church Union (Volkskirchenbund) was formed and advocated unification without respect to theological tradition and also increasing input from laymen. However, the People's Church Union quickly split along territorial lines after the churches' relationship with the new governments improved.

It was realised that one mainstream Protestant church for all of Germany was impossible and that any union would need a federal model. The churches met in Dresden in 1919 and created a plan for federation, and this plan was adopted in 1921 at Stuttgart. Then in 1922 the then 28 territorially defined Protestant churches founded the German Evangelical Church Confederation (Deutscher Evangelischer Kirchenbund, DEK). At the time, the federation was the largest Protestant church federation in Europe with around 40 million members. Because it was a federation of independent bodies, the Church Union's work was limited to foreign missions and relations with Protestant churches outside Germany, especially German Protestants in other countries.

In July 1933, the German Evangelical Church (Deutsche Evangelische Kirche, DEK) was formed under the influence of the German Christians, a pro-Nazi religious movement. They had much influence over the decisions of the first National Synod, via their unambiguous partisanship in successfully backing Ludwig Müller for the office of Reich bishop. He did not manage, however, to prevail over the Landeskirchen in the long term. The Confessing Church arose in resistance to the Nazi regime's ideology. After the installation of Hanns Kerrl as minister for church matters in a Führer-directive of 16 July 1935 and the foundation of the – in the end not materialising – Protestant Reich Church, the DEK played more or less no further role.

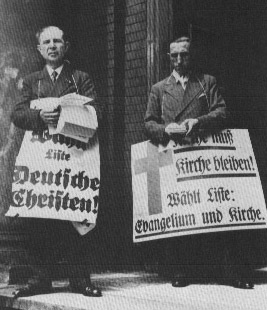
Synodal elections 1933: German Christians and Confessing Church campaigners in Berlin.

In 1948, freed from the German Christians' influence, the Lutheran, Reformed (including the German Reformed Church / Reformierte Kirche) and United churches came together as the Protestant Church in Germany at the Conference of Eisenach. In 1969, the regional Protestant churches in East Germany and East Berlin broke away from the EKD and formed the League of Evangelical Churches in the German Democratic Republic (German: Bund der Evangelischen Kirchen in der DDR, BEK), in 1970 also joined by the Moravian Herrnhut District. In June 1991, following German reunification, the BEK merged with the EKD.

While the members are no longer state churches, they enjoy constitutional protection as statutory corporations, and they are still called Landeskirchen, and some have this term in their official names. A modern English translation, however, would be regional church. Apart from some minor changes, the territories of the member churches today reflect Germany's political organisation in the year 1848, with regional churches for states or provinces that often no longer exist or whose borders changed since. For example, between 1945 and 1948, the remaining six ecclesiastical provinces (Kirchenprovinzen), each territorially comprising one of the Old Prussia provinces, within the Evangelical Church of the old-Prussian Union assumed independence as a consequence of the estrangement among them during the Nazi struggle of the churches. This turned the Evangelical Church of the old-Prussian Union into a mere umbrella, being itself a member of EKD (and the BEK, 1969–1991) but covering some regional church bodies, which were again themselves members of EKD (and the BEK, 1969–1991).

Since 1973, when many Protestant churches in Europe, including the EKD members, concluded the Leuenberg Agreement, also the then 21 EKD members introduced full communion for their parishioners and ministry among each other.

Since also the regional Protestant churches in East Germany had signed the Leuenberg Agreement, thus the then ten members of the Federation of Protestant Churches in the German Democratic Republic practised full communion with the EKD members too. Ordination of women is practised in all 20 member churches with many women having been ordained in recent years. There are also several women serving as bishops. Margot Käßmann, former bishop of the Evangelical Lutheran Church of Hanover and Chairperson of the Council of the EKD from 2009 until February 2010, was the first woman to head the EKD. Blessings of same-sex marriages is practised and allowed in 14 of 20 and blessing of same-sex unions are allowed in all other member churches. The EKD opposes abortion in most situations but believes it should remain legal.

The EKD has undergone a split in the 20th century and lost a bulk of its adherents in East Germany due to state atheist policies of the former East German government. After 1990, membership was counted and amounted to around the same number as the Roman Catholic Church. In the 21st century, membership in both the Evangelical Church and the Roman Catholic Church stagnates as more people are becoming religious nones.

A 2019 study estimated that there were 114,000 unreported victims of sexual abuse in the EKD and the Catholic Church in Germany combined. The 95% confidence interval comprises 28,000 to 280,000 victims. According to a study published in 2024, pedophilic members of the EKD have sexually abused at least 9,355 minors since 1946. Putting this figure into context, the coordinator of the study clarified that this number of cases was only the tip of the iceberg. The average age of the victims is 11 years.

== Membership ==
Confessions of EKD parishioners
1. United (administratively or confessionally, both Lutheran and Reformed; Prussian Union) (57.0%)
2. Lutheran (40.0%)
3. Reformed (3.00%)

Member churches by confession

Protestantism is the major religion in Northern, Eastern and Middle Germany, with the Reformed branch predominating in the extreme northwest and Lippe, the Lutheran branch in the north and south, and the United branch in Middle and Western Germany. While the majority of Christians in Southern Germany are Catholic, some areas in Baden-Württemberg and Bavaria are predominantly Protestant, e.g. Middle Franconia and the government region of Stuttgart. The vast majority of German Protestants belong to a member church of the EKD. With 20,236,000 members in 2020, around 24.3 percent of all Germans belong to a member church of the EKD. Average church attendance is lower, however, with only around a million people (1.2% of all Germans) attending a service on Sunday.

The regional Protestant church bodies accept each other as equals, despite denominational differences. No member church runs congregations or churches in the area of another member church, thus preventing competing with each other for parishioners. The only exception is the Evangelical Reformed Church, which combines Reformed congregations within the ambits of usually Lutheran member churches, which themselves do not include the eventual local Reformed congregations. Thus, for example, a Lutheran moving from a place where their parish belongs to a Lutheran member church, would be accepted in their new place of domicile by the locally competent congregation within another member church, even if this church and its local parish are Reformed or of united Protestant confession, with Lutheran being exchangeable with the two other respective Protestant confessions within the EKD. This is due to full altar and pulpit fellowship between all EKD member churches.

In this the ambits of the member churches resemble dioceses of the Anglican or Roman Catholic churches, however, else there is no common hierarchy supervising the member churches, who are legally independent equals with the EKD being their umbrella. Members of congregations within the member churches – like those of parishes within Catholic dioceses and those enrolled in Jewish congregations also enjoying statutory corporation status – are required to pay a church tax, a surcharge on their normal income tax collected by the states of Germany and passed on to the respective religious body.

=== 2011 census results by state ===
State	Church membership (2011)	Percentage of the population
Schleswig-Holstein	1,550,200	55.7%
Lower Saxony	3,976,430	51.5%
Bremen	279,180	43.2%
Hesse	2,426,990	40.8%
Baden-Württemberg	3,552,450	34.1%
Hamburg	573,960	33.9%
Rhineland-Palatinate	1,260,720	31.8%
Germany	24,552,110	30.8%
North Rhine-Westphalia	4,974,240	28.5%
Thuringia	529,010	24.3%
Berlin	706,650	21.6%
Saxony	856,340	21.4%
Bavaria	2,592,550	21.1%
Saarland	199,240	20.1%
Brandenburg	448,970	18.4%
Mecklenburg-Vorpommern	280,500	17.7%
Saxony-Anhalt	344,680	15.2%

=== Gallery ===
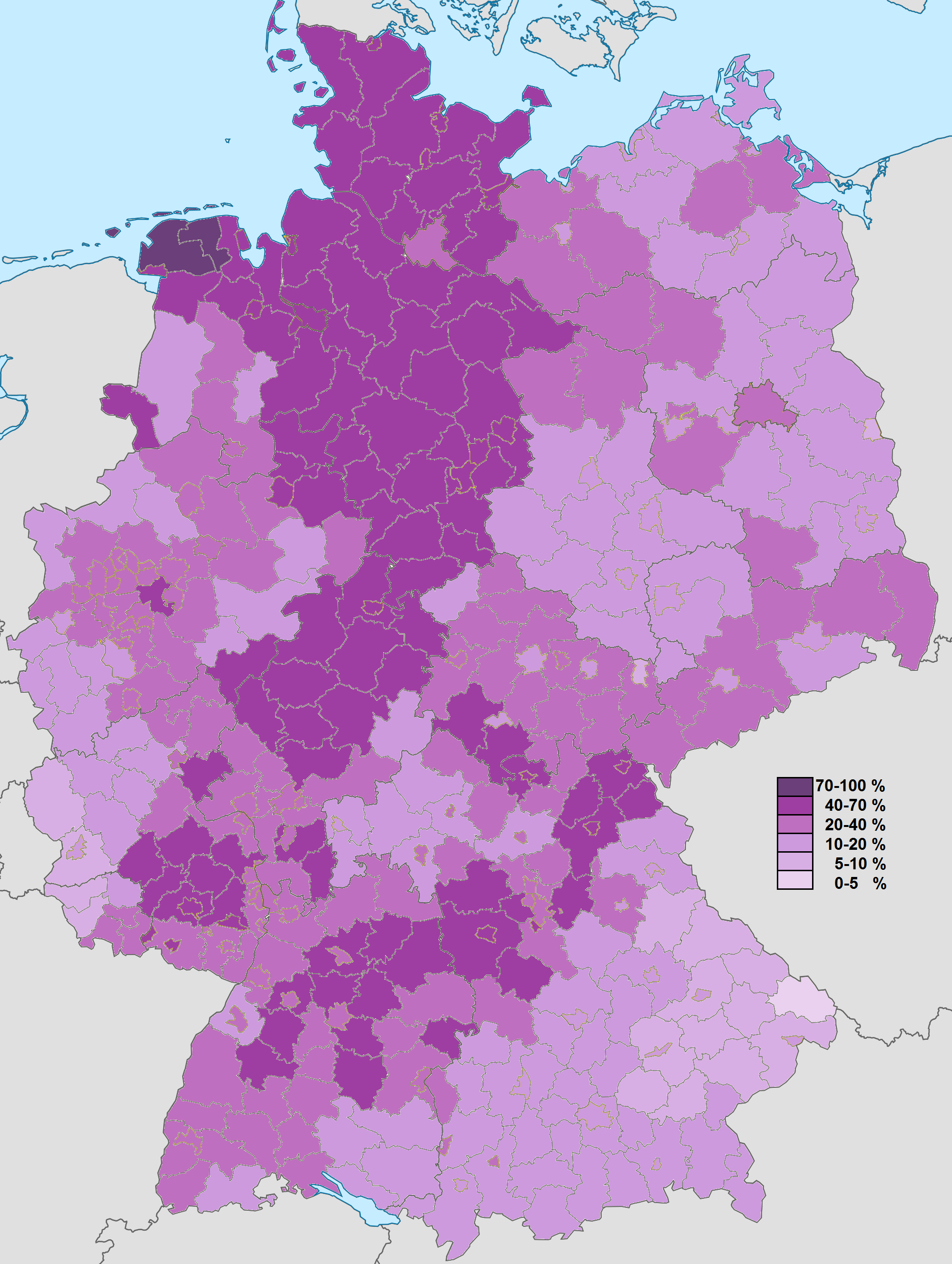
EKD Protestants according to the 2011 census.

Red denotes states in which EKD Protestants outnumber Catholics.

Flag of the Evangelical Church in Germany.

Another version, as used by German Protestants.

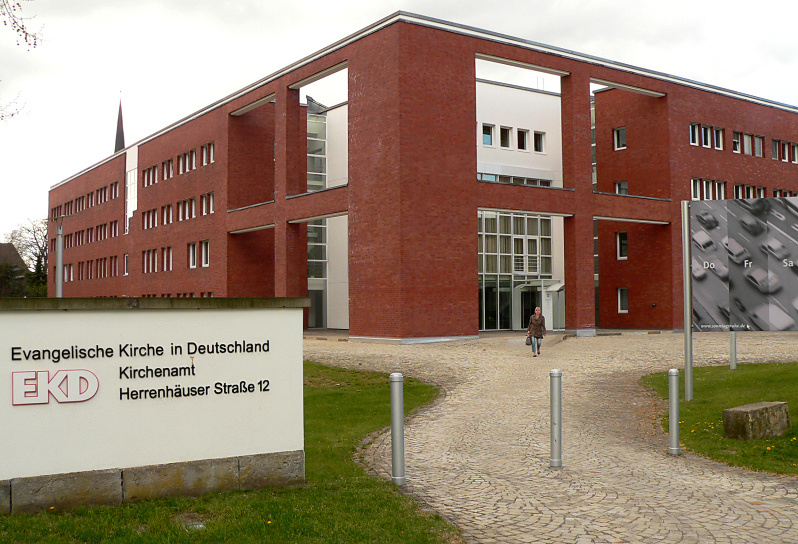
EKD church office in Hanover, Lower Saxony, Germany.

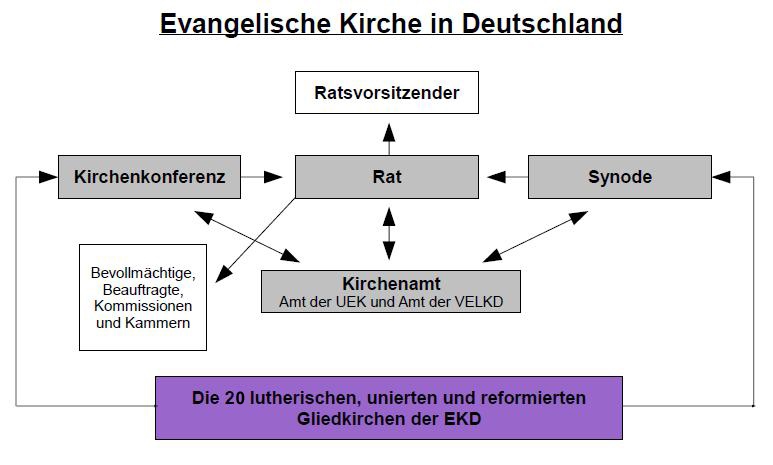
EKD's internal organization.

== Structure ==
The structure of the EKD is based on federal principles. Each regional church is responsible for Christian life in its own area while each regional church has its own special characteristics and retains its independence. The EKD carries out joint tasks with which its members have entrusted it. For the execution of these tasks, the Church has the following governing bodies, all organised and elected on democratic lines:

=== Synod ===
The Synod is the legislature of the EKD. It has 126 members: 106 elected by Landeskirchen synods and 20 appointed by the council. These 20 are appointed for their importance in the life of the Church and its agencies. Members serve six year terms and the synod meets annually.

==== Praeseses ====
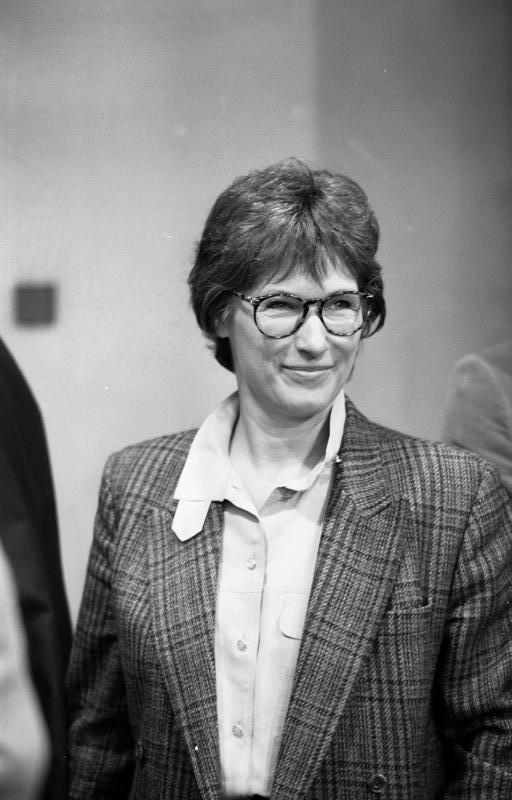
Irmgard Schwaetzer, praeses of the synod till 2021

- 1949–1955: Gustav Heinemann
- 1955–1961: Constantin von Dietze
- 1961–1970: Hans Puttfarcken
- 1970–1973: Ludwig Raiser
- 1973–1985: Cornelius von Heyl
- 1985–2003: Jürgen Schmude
- 2003–2009: Barbara Rinke
- 2009–2013: Katrin Göring-Eckardt
- 2013–2021: Irmgard Schwaetzer
- since 2021: Anna-Nicole Heinrich

=== Council ===
The EKD Council is the representative and governing body of the Evangelical Church in Germany. The Council of the EKD has 15 members jointly elected by the Synod and Church Conference who serve terms of six years.

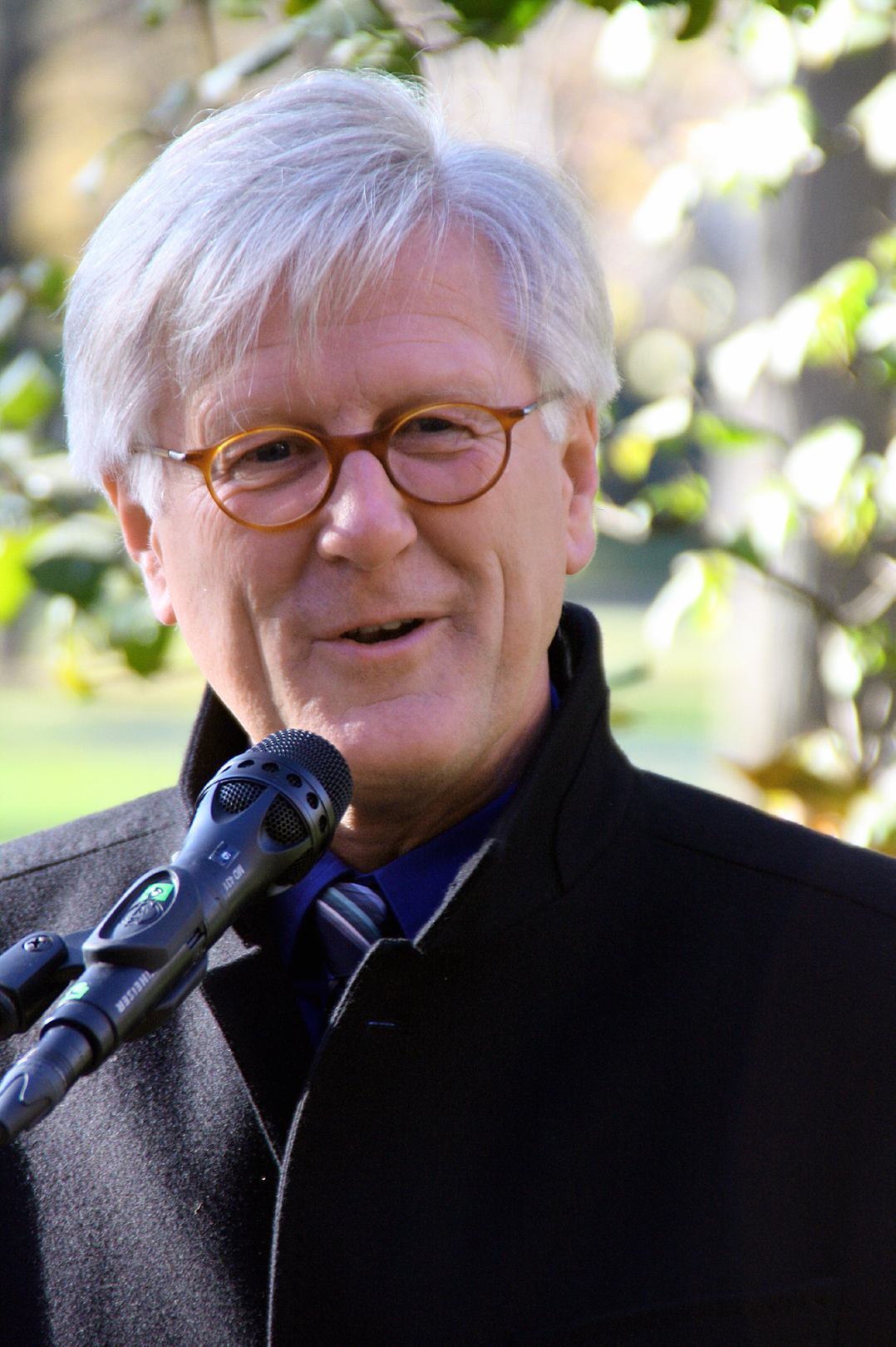
Heinrich Bedford-Strohm, former chairman of the Council of the EKD.

==== Chairpersons ====
The chairperson of the Council is the church's highest representative.

- 1945–1949: Theophil Wurm, bishop of Württemberg
- 1949–1961: Otto Dibelius, bishop of Berlin-Brandenburg
- 1961–1967: Kurt Scharf, bishop (from 1966) of Berlin-Brandenburg
- 1967–1973: Hermann Dietzfelbinger, bishop of Bavaria
- 1973–1979: Helmut Claß, bishop of Württemberg
- 1979–1985: Eduard Lohse, bishop of Hanover
- 1985–1991: Martin Kruse, bishop of Berlin-Brandenburg
- 1991–1997: Klaus Engelhardt, bishop of Baden
- 1997–2003: Manfred Kock (Theologian), Rhineland
- 2003–2009: Wolfgang Huber, bishop of Berlin-Brandenburg-Silesian Upper Lusatia
- 2009–2010: Margot Käßmann, bishop of Hanover
- 2010–2014: Nikolaus Schneider, Rhineland
- 2014–2021: Heinrich Bedford-Strohm, bishop of Bavaria
- 2021–2023: Annette Kurschus, Westphalia
- since 2023: Kirsten Fehrs, Evangelical Lutheran Church in Northern Germany

=== Conference ===
The Church Conference is where member churches, through the representatives of their governing boards, can directly participate in the work of the EKD.

=== Church Office ===
The Church Office is the administration of the EKD and shall the business of the Synod, Council and Conference of the EKD.

Main divisions:

- I = line, law and finance: President Hans Ulrich Anke
- II = Religious Activities and Education: Vice President Thies Gundlach (since 2010)
- III = Public Responsibility: Vice President Horst Gorski (also head of the Office of the United Evangelical Lutheran Church of Germany) (since 2007)
- IV = ecumenism and working abroad: Vice President Bishop Petra Bosse-Huber, foreign bishop and head of the Office of the Union of Evangelical Churches) (since 2014)

==== Presidents ====
- 1945–1948: Hans Asmussen
- 1949–1965: Heinz Brunotte
- 1966–1989: Walter Hammer
- 1989–1997: Otto von Campenhausen
- 1997–2006: Valentin Schmidt
- 2006–2010: Hermann Barth
- since 2010: Hans Ulrich Anke

The EKD Church Office has approximately 200 employees.

=== International activities ===
The EKD holds various charities ("Hilfswerke") under its auspices. The Gustav-Adolf-Werk (GAW) (Gustaphus Adolphus Union formerly) was founded 1832 in Leipzig as the first and eldest such organization and is responsible to aid feeble sister churches, especially in Roman Catholic countries and the Protestant diaspora. It has separate branches internationally, the organization in Austria is still called the Gustav-Adolf-Verein. Brot für die Welt is responsible for international development aid.

== Member churches (since 2012) ==
Member churches of the Evangelical Church in Germany (after the fusion of the Evangelical churches of Mecklenburg, North Elbia and Pomerania in 2012).

The umbrella of the Evangelical Church in Germany comprises 20 regional churches:

- 10 United and uniting churches (Lutheran and Reformed)
- 8 Lutheran
- 2 Reformed

These bodies are termed Landeskirchen ("Regional Churches") though in most cases, their territories do not correspond to the current federal states, but rather to former duchies, electorates and provinces or mergers thereof.

1. Evangelical Church of Anhalt (Evangelische Landeskirche Anhalts), a united church body in Anhalt
2. Evangelical Regional Church in Baden (Evangelische Landeskirche in Baden), a united church body in Baden
3. Evangelical Lutheran Church in Bavaria (Evangelisch-Lutherische Kirche in Bayern), a Lutheran church body in Bavaria
4. Evangelical Church Berlin - Brandenburg - Silesian Upper Lusatia (Evangelische Kirche Berlin-Brandenburg-schlesische Oberlausitz), a united church body in Berlin-Brandenburg-Silesian Upper Lusatia merged in 2004 from:
  - Evangelical Church in Berlin-Brandeburg
  - Evangelical Church of Silesian Upper Lusatia
5. Evangelical Lutheran Church in Brunswick (Evangelisch-Lutherische Landeskirche in Braunschweig), a Lutheran church body in Brunswick
6. Bremen Evangelical Church (Bremische Evangelische Kirche), a united church body in Bremen
7. Evangelical-Lutheran Church of Hanover (Evangelisch-Lutherische Landeskirche Hannovers), a Lutheran church body in the former Province of Hanover
8. Evangelical Church in Hesse and Nassau (Evangelische Kirche in Hessen und Nassau), a united church body in the former People's State of Hesse and Nassau
9. Evangelical Church of Hessen Electorate-Waldeck (Evangelische Kirche von Kurhessen-Waldeck), a united church body in former Hesse-Cassel and Waldeck
10. Church of Lippe (Lippische Landeskirche), a Reformed church body of Lippe
11. Evangelical Church in Central Germany (Evangelische Kirche in Mitteldeutschland), a united church body that was created in 2009 from the merger of:
  - Evangelical Church of the Church Province of Saxony (Evangelische Kirche der Kirchenprovinz Sachsen) (Province of Saxony, also known as Prussian Saxony), formed out of the Prussian Union of Churches in 1950
  - Evangelical Lutheran Church in Thuringia (Evangelisch-Lutherische Kirche in Thüringen) (Thuringia)
12. Evangelical Lutheran Church in Northern Germany Evangelisch-Lutherische Kirche in Norddeutschland), a Lutheran church body that was created in 2012 from the merger of:
  - North Elbian Evangelical Lutheran Church (Nordelbische Evangelisch-Lutherische Kirche), a Lutheran church body in Northern Germany, which had been founded in 1977
  - Evangelical Lutheran Church of Mecklenburg (Evangelisch-Lutherische Landeskirche Mecklenburgs), a Lutheran church body in Mecklenburg, which had been founded in 1934
  - Pomeranian Evangelical Church (Pommersche Evangelische Kirche), a united church body in Pomerania, formed out of the Prussian Union of Churches after World War II
13. Evangelical Lutheran Church in Oldenburg (Evangelisch-Lutherische Kirche in Oldenburg), a Lutheran church body in Oldenburg
14. Evangelical Church of the Palatinate (Evangelische Kirche der Pfalz) or Protestantische Landeskirche, a united church body in Palatinate
15. Evangelical Church in the Rhineland (Evangelische Kirche im Rheinland), a united church body in the Rhineland, formed out of the Prussian Union of Churches in 1948
16. Evangelical-Lutheran Church of Saxony (Evangelisch-Lutherische Landeskirche Sachsens), a Lutheran church body in Saxony
17. Evangelical Lutheran Church of Schaumburg-Lippe (Evangelisch-Lutherische Landeskirche Schaumburg-Lippe), a Lutheran church body in Schaumburg-Lippe
18. Evangelical Church of Westphalia (Evangelische Kirche von Westfalen), a united church body in Westphalia, formed out of the Prussian Union of Churches in 1945
19. Evangelical-Lutheran Church in Württemberg (Evangelische Landeskirche in Württemberg), a Lutheran church body in Württemberg
20. Evangelical Reformed Church (Evangelisch-reformierte Kirche), a Reformed church body, covering the territories of No. 3, 5, 7, 12, 16, 17, and 19

The Moravian Church ("Herrnhuter Brüdergemeine") and the Federation of Evangelical Reformed Congregations are associate members.

== See also ==
- List of Christian denominations by number of members
- List of the largest Protestant denominations
- Protestantism in Germany
- Barmen Declaration
- German Evangelical Church Assembly
- Evangelical Theology Student Council
- Protestant Women in Germany
- Union of Protestant Churches in the EKD
