= Confessing Church =

1930s German Protestant movement

The Confessing Church (German: Bekennende Kirche, pronounced [bəˈkɛnəndə ˈkɪʁçə]) was a movement within German Protestantism in Nazi Germany that arose in opposition to government-sponsored efforts to unify all of the Protestant churches into a single pro-Nazi German Evangelical Church.

== Demographics ==
The following statistics (as of January 1933 unless otherwise stated) are an aid in understanding the context of the political and theological developments discussed in this article.

- Number of Protestants in Germany: 45 million
- Number of free church Protestants: 150,000
- Largest regional Protestant church: Evangelical Church of the Old Prussian Union (German: Evangelische Kirche der altpreußischen Union), with 18 million members, the church strongest in members in the country at the time.
- Number of Protestant pastors: 18,000
  - Number of Protestant pastors who strongly adhered to the beliefs of the "German Christian" church faction as of 1935: 3000
  - Number of Protestant pastors who strongly adhered to the beliefs of the "Confessing Church" church faction as of 1935: 3000
    - Number of Protestant pastors who were arrested during 1935: 700
  - Number of Protestant pastors who were not closely affiliated with or did not adhere to the beliefs of either faction: 12,000
- Total population of Germany: 65 million
- Number of Jews in Germany: 525,000

== Historical background ==
=== German Protestantism ===
==== The Holy Roman Empire and the German Empire ====
After the Peace of Augsburg in 1555, the principle that the religion of the ruler dictated the religion of the ruled (cuius regio, eius religio) was observed throughout the Holy Roman Empire. Section 24 of the Peace of Augsburg (ius emigrandi) guaranteed members of denominations other than the ruler's the freedom of emigration with all their possessions. Political stalemates among the government members of different denominations within a number of the republican free imperial cities such as Augsburg, the Free City of Frankfurt, and Regensburg, made their territories de facto bi-denominational, but the two denominations did not usually have equal legal status.

The Peace of Augsburg protected Catholicism and Lutheranism, but not Calvinism. Thus, in 1613, when John Sigismund, Elector of Brandenburg converted from Lutheranism to Calvinism, he could not exercise the principle of Cuius regio, eius religio' ("whose realm, their religion"). This situation paved the way for bi- or multi-denominational monarchies, wherein a ruler adhering to a creed different from most of his subjects would permit conversions to his minority denomination and immigration of his fellow faithful. In 1648, the Peace of Westphalia extended the principle of cuius regio, eius religio to Calvinism.

However, the principle grew impracticable in the 17th and 18th centuries, which experienced continuous territorial changes arising from annexations and inheritances, and the religious conversion of rulers. For instance, Saxon Augustus II the Strong converted from Lutheranism to Catholicism in 1697, but did not exercise his cuius regio, eius religio privilege. A conqueror or successor to the throne who adhered to a different creed from his new subjects usually would not complicate his takeover by imposing conversions. These enlarged realms spawned diaspora congregations, as immigrants settled in areas where the prevailing creeds differed from their own. This juxtaposition of beliefs in turn brought about more frequent personal changes in denomination, often in the form of marital conversions.

Still, regional mobility was low, especially in the countryside, which generally did not attract newcomers, but experienced rural exodus, so that today's denominational make-up in Germany and Switzerland still represents the former boundaries among territories ruled by Calvinist, Catholic, or Lutheran rulers in the 16th century quite well. In a major departure, the legislature of the North German Confederation instituted the right of irreligionism in 1869, permitting the declaration of secession from all religious bodies.

The Protestant Church in Germany was and is divided into geographic regions and along denominational affiliations (Calvinist, Lutheran, and United churches). In the course of the 18th and 19th centuries, the then-existing monarchies and republics established regional churches (Landeskirchen), comprising the respective congregations within the then-existing state borders. In the case of Protestant ruling dynasties, each regional church affiliated with the regnal houses, and the crown provided financial and institutional support for its church. Church and State were, therefore, to a large extent combined on a regional basis.

==== Weimar Germany ====
In the aftermath of World War I with its political and social turmoil, the regional churches lost their secular rulers. With revolutionary fervor in the air, the conservative church leaders had to contend with socialists (Social Democrats (SPD) and Independent Social Democrats (USPD)), who mostly held to disestablishmentarianism. When Adolph Hoffmann, a strident secularist, was appointed Prussian Minister of Education and Public Worship in November 1918 by the USPD, he attempted to implement a number of plans, which included:

- cutting government subsidies for the church
- confiscation of church property
- abolition of theology as a course of study in universities
- banning school prayer
- banning compulsory religious instruction in schools
- prohibiting schools from requiring attendance at worship services

After storms of protests from both Protestants and Catholics, Hoffmann was forced to resign and, by political means, the churches were able to prevent complete disestablishment. A compromise was reached — one which favored the Protestant church establishment. There would no longer be state churches, but the churches remained public corporations and retained their subsidies from the state governments for services they performed on behalf of the government (running hospitals, kindergartens etc.). In turn, on behalf of the churches, the state governments collected church fees from those taxpayers enlisted as parishioners and distributed these funds to the churches. These fees were, and still are, used to finance church activities and administration. The theological faculties in the universities continued to exist, as did religious instruction in the schools, however, allowing the parents to opt out for their children. The rights formerly held by the monarchs in the German Empire simply devolved to church councils instead, and the high-ranking church administrators — who had been civil servants in the Empire — simply became church officials instead. The governing structure of the churches effectively changed with the introduction of chairpersons elected by church synods instead of being appointed by the state.

Accordingly, in this initial period of the Weimar Republic, in 1922, the Protestant Church in Germany formed the German Evangelical Church Confederation of 28 regional (or provincial) churches (German: Landeskirchen), with their regional boundaries more or less delineated by those of the federal states. This federal system allowed for a great deal of regional autonomy in the governance of German Protestantism, as it allowed for a national church parliament that served as a forum for discussion and that endeavored to resolve theological and organizational conflicts.

=== The Nazi regime ===
Many Protestants voted for the Nazis in the elections of summer and autumn 1932 and March 1933. This differed noticeably from Catholic populated areas, where the results of votes cast in favor of the Nazis were lower than the national average, even after the Machtergreifung ("seizure of power") of Hitler.

The [Protestant] churches did not reject National Socialism on principle. The idea of a strong authority and a close bond between throne and altar, of the kind that existed in the empire between 1871 and 1918, was in keeping with Protestant tradition. Many ... [Protestants] had reservations about the democratic Weimar Republic and sympathized with political forces – such as the German National People's Party – that idealized the past.

A limited number of Protestants, such as Karl Barth, Dietrich Bonhoeffer and Wilhelm Busch, objected to the Nazis on moral and theological principles; they could not reconcile the Nazi state's claim to total control over the person with the ultimate sovereignty that, in Christian orthodoxy, must belong only to God.

=== German Christians ===
The German Christian movement in the Protestant Church developed in the late Weimar period. They were, for the most part, a "group of fanatic Nazi Protestants" who were organized in 1931 to help win elections of presbyters and synodals of the old-Prussian church (last free election on 13 November 1932). In general, the group's political and religious motivations developed in response to the social and political tensions wrought by the end of World War I and the attendant substitution of a republican regime for the authoritarian one of Wilhelm II — much the same as the conditions leading to Hitler's rise to power.

The German Christian movement was sustained and encouraged by factors such as:

- the 400th anniversary (in 1917) of Martin Luther's posting of the Ninety-five Theses in 1517, an event which served to endorse German nationalism, to emphasize that Germany had a preferred place in the Protestant tradition, and to legitimize antisemitism. This was reinforced by the Luther Renaissance Movement of Professor Emmanuel Hirsch. The extreme and shocking antisemitism of Martin Luther came to light rather late in his life, but had been a consistent theme in Christian Germany for centuries thereafter.
- the revival of völkisch traditions
- the de-emphasis of the Old Testament in Protestant theology, and the removal of parts deemed "too Jewish", replacing the New Testament with a dejudaized version entitled Die Botschaft Gottes (The Message of God)
- the respect for temporal (secular) authority, which had been emphasized by Luther and has arguable scriptural support (Romans 13)

"For German Christians, race was the fundamental principle of human life, and they interpreted and effected that notion in religious terms. German Christianity emphasized the distinction between the visible and invisible church. For the German Christians, the church on earth was not the fellowship of the holy spirit described in the New Testament but a contrast to it, a vehicle for the expression of race and ethnicity".

The German Christians were sympathetic to the Nazi regime's goal of "co-ordinating" the individual Protestant churches into a single and uniform Reich church, consistent with the Volk ethos and the Führerprinzip.

=== Creating a New National Church (Deutsche Evangelische Kirche) ===
When the Nazis took power, the German Protestant church consisted of a federation of independent regional churches which included Lutheran, Reformed and United traditions. In late April 1933 the leadership of the Protestant federation agreed to write a new constitution for a new "national" church, the German Evangelical Church (German: Deutsche Evangelische Kirche or DEK). This had been one goal of many German Christians for some time, as centralization would enhance the coordination of Church and State, as a part of the overall Nazi process of Gleichschaltung ("coordination", resulting in co-option). These German Christians agitated for Hitler's advisor on religious affairs, Ludwig Müller, to be elected as the new Church's bishop (German: Reichsbischof).

Müller had poor political skills, little political support within the Church and no real qualifications for the job, other than his commitment to Nazism and a desire to exercise power. When the federation council met in May 1933 to approve the new constitution, it elected Friedrich von Bodelschwingh the Younger as Reichsbischof of the new Protestant Reich Church by a wide margin, largely on the advice and support of the leadership of the 28 church bodies.

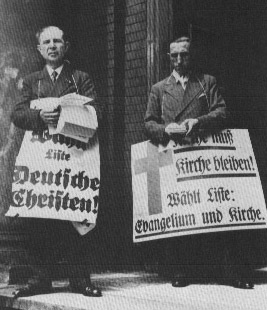
Synodal elections 1933: German Christians and Confessing Church campaigners in Berlin

Hitler was infuriated with the rejection of his candidate, and after a series of political maneuvers, Bodelschwingh resigned and Müller was elected as the new Reichsbischof on 27 September 1933, after the government had already imposed him on 28 June 1933. The formidable propaganda apparatus of the Nazi state was deployed to help the German Christians win presbyter and synodal elections in order to dominate the upcoming synod and finally put Müller into office. Hitler discretionarily decreed unconstitutional premature re-elections of all presbyters and synodals for 23 July; the night before the elections, Hitler made a personal appeal to Protestants by radio.

The German Christians won handily (70–80% of all seats in presbyteries and synods), except in four regional churches and one provincial body of the united old-Prussian church: the Evangelical Lutheran Church in Bavaria right of the river Rhine ("right" meaning "east of"), the Evangelical Lutheran State Church of Hanover, Evangelical Reformed State Church of the Province of Hanover the Lutheran Evangelical State Church in Württemberg, and in the old-Prussian ecclesiastical province of Westphalia, where the German Christians gained no majorities. Among adherents of the Confessing Church these church bodies were termed intact churches (German: Intakte Kirchen), as opposed to the German Christian-ruled bodies which they designated as "destroyed churches" (German: zerstörte Kirchen). This electoral victory enabled the German Christians to secure sufficient delegates to prevail at the so-called national synod that conducted the "revised" September election for Reichsbischof. Further pro-Nazi developments followed the elevation of Müller to the bishopric: in late summer the old-Prussian church (led by Müller since his government appointment on 6 July 1933) adopted the Aryan Paragraph, effectively defrocking clergy of Jewish descent and even clergy married to non-Aryans.

== The Confessing Church ==
=== Formation ===
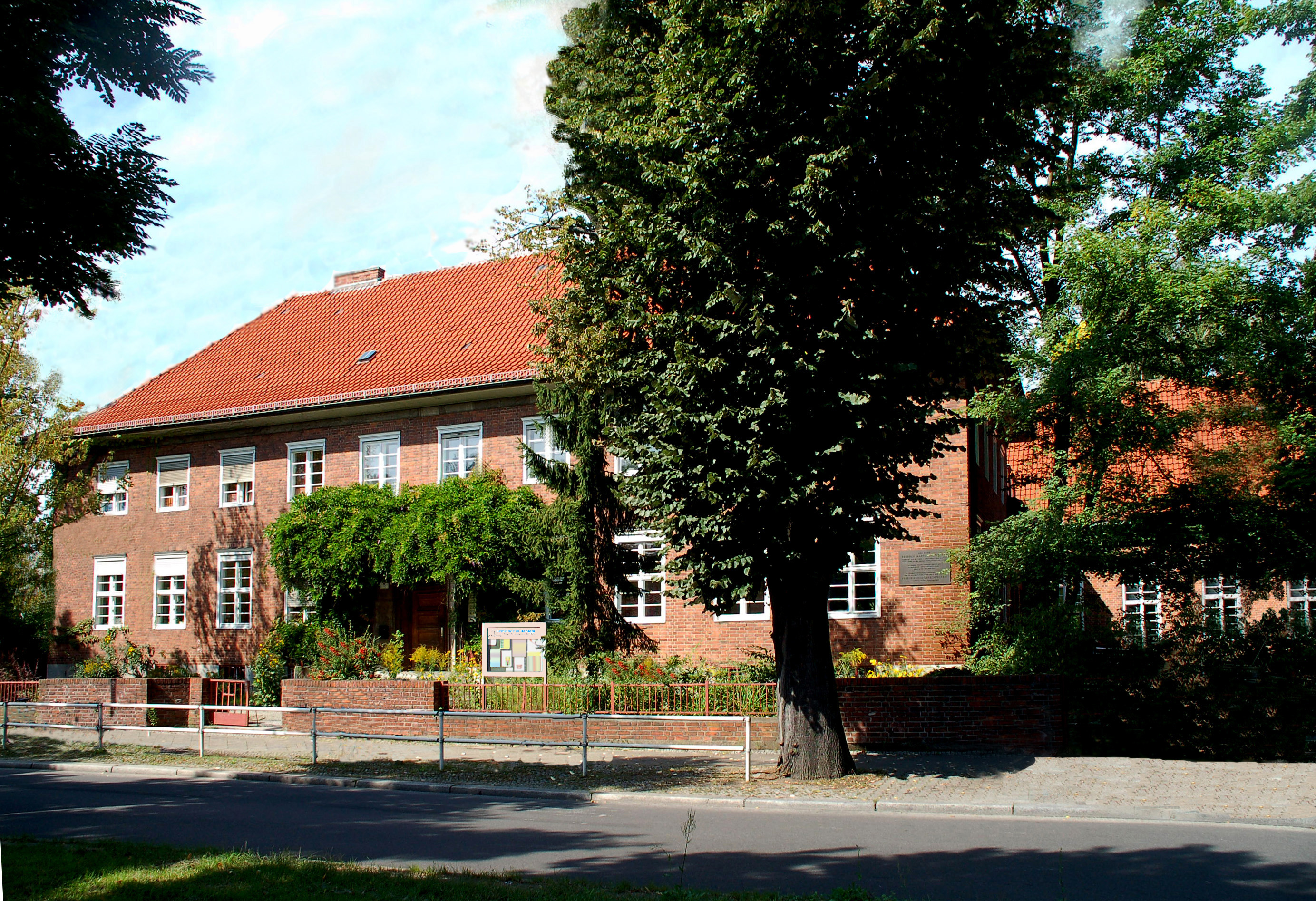
Meeting house of the Evangelical Congregation, Dahlem, Berlin

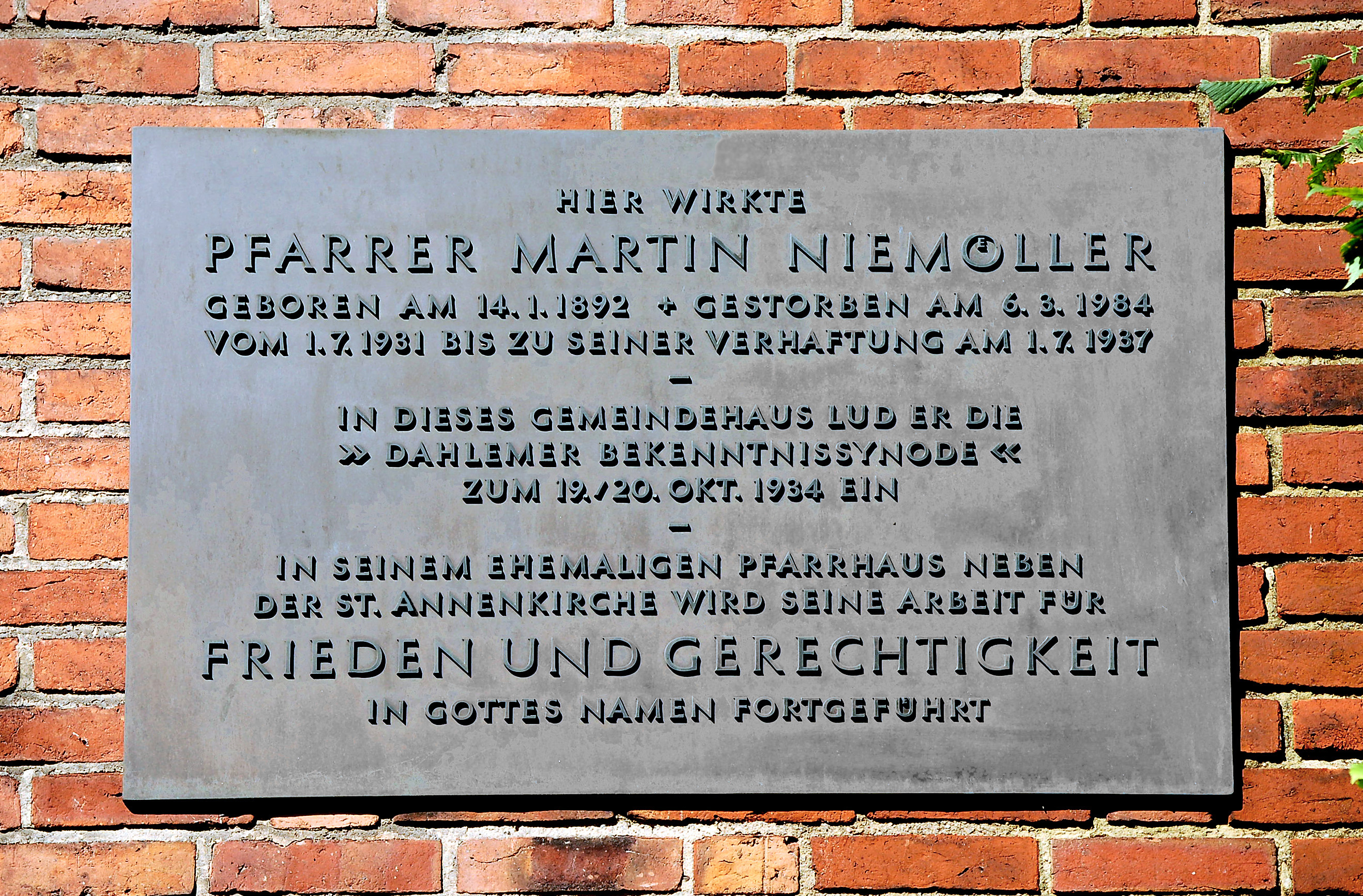
Plaque commemorating the second Reich Synod of Confession on the outside wall of the meeting house

The Aryan Paragraph created a furor among some of the clergy. Under the leadership of Martin Niemöller, the Pastors' Emergency League (Pfarrernotbund) was formed, presumably for the purpose of assisting clergy of Jewish descent, but the League soon evolved into a locus of dissent against Nazi interference in church affairs. Its membership grew while the objections and rhetoric of the German Christians escalated.

The League pledged itself to contest the state's attempts to infringe on the confessional freedom of the churches, that is to say, their ability to determine their own doctrine. It expressly opposed the adoption of the Aryan Paragraph which changed the meaning of baptism by distinguishing between Jews and Christians of Jewish descent. The League insisted, consistent with the demands of orthodox Christianity, that converted Jews and their descendants were as Christian as anyone else and were full members of the Church in every sense.

At this stage, the objections of Protestant leaders were primarily motivated by the desire for church autonomy and church–state demarcation rather than opposition to the persecution of non-Christian Jews, which was only just beginning. Eventually, the League evolved into the Confessing Church.

On 13 November 1933 a rally of German Christians was held at the Berlin Sportpalast, where — before a packed hall — banners proclaimed the unity of National Socialism and Christianity, interspersed with the omnipresent swastikas. One speaker, Reinhold Krause, was a school teacher and the Berlin district leader of the German Christians. He advocated the abandonment of the Old Testament with its tales of "cattle traders and pimps" in front of twenty thousand people. Resolutions were also proposed that would require all pastors to take a personal oath to Hitler, to require all churches to adopt and implement the Aryan Paragraph and to exclude converted Jews and their descendants from the church. Krause's speech was so vulgar and objectionable that even Müller disavowed him and, for public relations purposes, suspended him from the group as a "punishment" to emphasize the disavowal. Some subjects discussed from the stage of the Sportspalast include:

- the removal of all pastors unsympathetic with National Socialism
- the expulsion of members of Jewish descent, who might be arrogated to a separate church
- the implementation of the Aryan Paragraph church-wide
- the removal of the Old Testament from the Bible
- the removal of "non-German" elements from religious services
- the adoption of a more "heroic" and "positive" interpretation of Jesus, who in pro-Aryan fashion should be portrayed to be battling mightily against corrupt Jewish influences.

This rather shocking attempt to rally the pro-Nazi elements among the German Christians backfired, as it now appeared to many Protestants that the State was attempting to intervene in the most central theological matters of the church, rather than only in matters of church organization and polity.

While Hitler, a consummate politician, was sensitive to the implications of such developments, Ludwig Müller was apparently not: he fired and transferred pastors adhering to the Emergency League, and in April 1934 actually deposed the heads of the Württembergian church (Bishop Theophil Wurm) and of the Bavarian church (Bishop Hans Meiser). They and the synodals of their church bodies continuously refused to declare the merger of their church bodies in the German Evangelical Church (DEK). The continuing aggressiveness of the DEK and Müller spurred the schismatic Protestant leaders to further action.

=== Barmen Declaration of Faith ===
In May 1934, the opposition met in a church synod in Barmen. The rebellious pastors denounced Müller and his leadership and declared that they and their congregations constituted the true Evangelical Church of Germany. The Barmen Declaration, primarily authored by Karl Barth, with the consultation and advice of other protesting pastors like Martin Niemöller and individual congregations, re-affirmed that the German Church was not an "organ of the State" and that the concept of State control over the Church was doctrinally false. The Declaration stipulated, at its core, that any State — even the totalitarian one — necessarily encountered a limit when confronted with God's commandments. The Barmen declaration became in fact the foundation of the Confessing Church, confessing because it was based on a confession of faith.

After the Barmen Declaration, there were in effect two opposing movements in the German Protestant Church:

- the German Christian movement and
- the Confessing Church (the Bekennende Kirche, BK), often naming itself Deutsche Evangelische Kirche too, in order to reinforce its claim to be the true church

It should nevertheless be emphasized that the Confessing Church's rebellion was directed at the regime's ecclesiastical policy, and the German Christian movement, not at its overall political and social objectives.

The Confessional Church as a whole did not offer resistance in a political sense, with the intent of bringing down the National Socialist regime. It fought first to keep its organizational structures intact, and then to preserve the independence of church doctrine, according to which the Christian commandments were not to be subordinated to Nazi ideology.... [yet] the adherents of the Church found themselves increasingly in a state of principled opposition to both the state and the German Christians...they opposed a faith that was blended with anti-Semitism and neo-Pagan heresies ...[such as] a "heroic Jesus" and a faith founded on race, Volkstum and nation.

=== Post-Barmen ===
The situation grew complex after Barmen. Müller's ineptitude in political matters did not endear him to the Führer. Furthermore, the Sportpalast speech had proved a public relations disaster; the Nazis, who had promised "freedom of religion" in point 24 of their 25-point program, now appeared to be dictating religious doctrine.

Hitler sought to defuse the situation in the autumn of 1934 by lifting the house arrest of Meiser and Wurm, leaders of the Bavarian and Württembergian Lutheran churches, respectively. Having lost his patience with Müller in particular and the German Christians in general, he removed Müller's authority, brought Gleichschaltung to a temporary halt and created a new Reich Ministry – aptly named Church Affairs – under Hanns Kerrl, one of Hitler's lawyer friends. The Kirchenkampf ("church struggle") would now be continued on the basis of Church against State, rather than internally between two factions of a single church. Kerrl's charge was to attempt another coordination, hopefully with more tact than the heavy-handed Müller.

Kerrl was more mild-mannered than the somewhat vulgar Müller, and was also politically astute; he shrewdly appointed a committee of conciliation, to be headed by Wilhelm Zoellner, a retired Westphalian general superintendent who was generally respected within the church and did not identify with any one faction. Müller himself resigned, more or less in disgrace, at the end of 1935, having failed to integrate the Protestant church and in fact having created somewhat of a rebellion. Martin Niemöller's group generally cooperated with the new Zoellner committee, but still maintained that it represented the true Protestant Church in Germany and that the DEK was, to put it more bluntly than Niemöller would in public, no more than a collection of heretics.

The Confessing Church, under the leadership of Niemöller, addressed a polite, but firm, memorandum to Hitler in May 1936. The memorandum protested the regime's anti-Christian tendencies, denounced the regime's antisemitism and demanded that the regime terminate its interference with the internal affairs of the Protestant church.

This was essentially the proverbial straw that broke the back of the camel. The regime responded by:

- arresting several hundred dissenting pastors
- murdering Dr. Friedrich Weißler, office manager and legal advisor of the "second preliminary church executive" of the Confessing Church, in the Sachsenhausen concentration camp
- confiscating the funds of the Confessing Church
- forbidding the Confessing Church from taking up collections of money

Eventually, the Nazi tactics of repression were too much for Zoellner to bear and he resigned on 12 February 1937, after the Gestapo had denied him the right to visit some imprisoned pastors. The Minister of Church Affairs spoke to the churchmen the next day in a shocking presentation that clearly disclosed the regime's hostility to the church:

Positive Christianity is National Socialism ... [and] National Socialism is the doing of God's will.... Dr. Zoellner ... has tried to tell me that Christianity consists in faith in Christ as the Son of God. That makes me laugh ... Christianity is not dependent upon the Apostle's Creed .... [but] is represented by the Party .... the German people are now called ... by the Führer to a real Christianity .... The Führer is the herald of a new revelation.

=== Resistance movement ===
The Barmen Declaration itself did not mention the Nazi persecution of Jews or other totalitarian measures taken by the Nazis; it was a declaration of ecclesiastical independence, consistent with centuries of Protestant doctrine. It was not a statement of rebellion against the regime or its political and social doctrines and actions.

We totally deferred our political opposition to Nazism and tried to bring the church opposition to its feet… We did it from a tactical standpoint… We hoped to bring [our brethren] to recognize the contradictions of being a Christian and a Nazi… so we deferred our political polemic against the Nazi state.

The Confessing Church engaged in only one form of unified resistance: resistance to state manipulation of religious affairs. While many leaders of the Confessing Church attempted to persuade the church to take a radical stance in opposition to Hitler, it never adopted this policy.

== Aftermath ==
Some of the leaders of the Confessing Church, such as Martin Niemöller and Heinrich Grüber, were sent to Nazi concentration camps. While Grüber and Niemöller survived, not all did: Dietrich Bonhoeffer was sent initially to Tegel Prison, then to Buchenwald concentration camp, and finally to Flossenbürg concentration camp, where he was hanged. This left Christians who did not agree with the Nazis without leadership for much of the era.

A select few of the Confessing Church risked their lives to help Jews hiding illegally in Berlin during the war. A hat would be passed around at the end of secret meetings into which the congregation would donate identity cards and passbooks. These were then modified by forgers and given to underground Jews so they could pass as legal Berlin citizens. Several members of the Confessing Church were caught and tried for their part in creating forged papers, including Franz Kaufmann who was shot, and Helene Jacobs, who was jailed.

Many of those few Confessing Church members who actively attempted to subvert Hitler's policies were extremely cautious and relatively ineffective. Some urged the need for more radical and risky resistance action. A Berlin Deaconess, Marga Meusel, showed courage and offered "perhaps the most impassioned, the bluntest, the most detailed and most damning of the protests against the silence of the Christian churches" because she went the furthest in speaking on behalf of the Jews. Another Confessing Church member who was notable for speaking out against anti-Semitism was Hans Ehrenberg.

Meusel and two other leading women members of the Confessing Church in Berlin, Elisabeth Schmitz and Gertrud Staewen, were members of the Berlin parish where Martin Niemöller served as pastor. Their efforts to prod the church to speak out for the Jews were unsuccessful.

Meusel and Bonhoeffer condemned the failure of the Confessing Church – which was organized specifically in resistance to governmental interference in religion – to move beyond its very limited concern for religious civil liberties and to focus instead on helping the suffering Jews. In 1935 Meusel protested the Confessing Church's timid action:

Why does the church do nothing? Why does it allow unspeakable injustice to occur? ... What shall we one day answer to the question, where is thy brother Abel? The only answer that will be left to us, as well as to the Confessing Church, is the answer of Cain. ("Am I my brother's keeper?" Genesis 4:9)

Karl Barth also wrote in 1935: "For the millions that suffer unjustly, the Confessing Church does not yet have a heart".

The Stuttgart Declaration of Guilt, was a declaration issued on 19 October 1945 by the Council of the Protestant Church in Germany (Evangelischen Kirche in Deutschland or EKD), in which it confessed guilt for its inadequacies in opposition to the Nazis. It was written mainly by former members of Confessing Church.

The Nazi policy of interference in Protestantism did not achieve its aims. A majority of German Protestants sided neither with Deutsche Christen, nor with the Confessing Church. Both groups also faced significant internal disagreements and division. The Nazis gave up trying to co-opt Christianity and instead expressed contempt toward it. When German Christians persisted, some members of the SS found it hard to believe that they were sincere and even thought they might be a threat.

== See also ==
- Günther Dehn
- Kirchenkampf

== Bibliography ==
- Barnes, Kenneth C. (1991). Nazism, Liberalism, & Christianity: Protestant social thought in Germany & Great Britain, 1925–1937. University Press of Kentucky. ISBN 0-8131-1729-1.
- Barnett, Victoria (1992). For the Soul of the People: Protestant Protest Against Hitler. Oxford University Press US. ISBN 0-19-512118-X.
- Baumel, Judith Tydor (2001). The Holocaust Encyclopedia. Yale University Press. ISBN 0-300-08432-3.
- Benz, Wolfgang (2006). A Concise History of the Third Reich. University of California Press. ISBN 0-520-23489-8.
- Bergen, Doris L. (1996). Twisted Cross: The German Christian Movement in the Third Reich. Chapel Hill: UNC Press. ISBN 0-8078-4560-4.
- Browning, Christopher (2015). Holocaust scholarship : personal trajectories and professional interpretations. Houndmills, Basingstoke New York: Palgrave Macmillan. ISBN 978-1-137-51418-9.
- Ericksen, Robert (2012). Complicity in the Holocaust : churches and universities in Nazi Germany. New York: Cambridge University Press. ISBN 978-1-107-01591-3.
- Evans, Richard J. (2006). The Third Reich in Power. London: Penguin Books. ISBN 0-14-100976-4.
- Gerlach, Wolfgang (2000). And the witnesses were silent the Confessing Church and the persecution of the Jews. Lincoln: University of Nebraska Press. ISBN 0-8032-2165-7.
- Goldhagen, Daniel (1996). Hitler's willing executioners : ordinary Germans and the Holocaust. New York: Knopf Distributed by Random House. ISBN 978-0-679-44695-8.
- Hockenos, Matthew D. (2004). A Church Divided: German Protestants Confront the Nazi Past. Bloomington: Indiana University Press. ISBN 978-0-253-34448-9.
- Kershaw, Ian (1999). Hitler 1889–1936: Hubris. New York: W. W. Norton & Company. ISBN 0-393-04671-0.
- Schonhaus, Cioma (2009). The Forger: An Extraordinary Story of Survival in Wartime Berlin. Da Capo Press. ISBN 978-0-306-81770-0.
- Shirer, William L. (1960). The Rise and Fall of the Third Reich. New York: Simon & Schuster. LCCN 60-6729.
- Toland, John (1976). Adolf Hitler. New York: Doubleday & Company. ISBN 0-385-03724-4.
- Wiese, Christian (2010). "Chapter 9: An "Indelible Stigma" : The Churches between Silence, Ideological Involvement, and Political Complicity". In Wiese, Christian; Betts, Paul (eds.). Years of persecution, years of extermination Saul Friedlander and the future of Holocaust studies. London: Continuum. pp. 157–192. ISBN 978-1-4411-2987-1.
