= Barmen Declaration =

1934 declaration opposing Nazi ideology

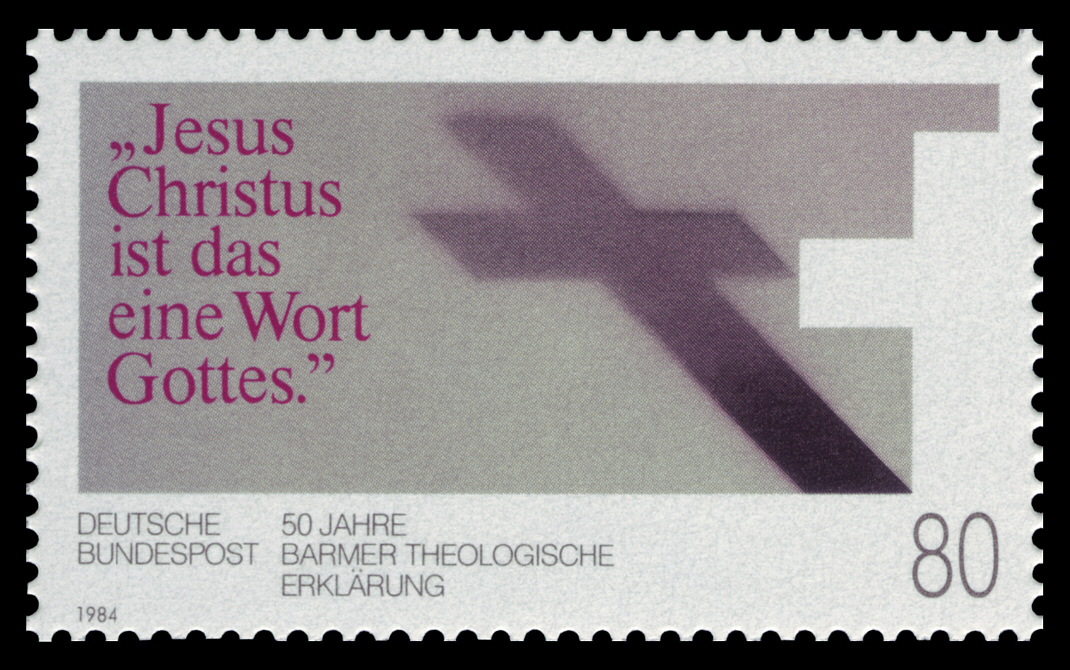
German stamp: 50 years of the "Barmen Declaration"

The Barmen Declaration or the Theological Declaration of Barmen 1934 (German: Die Barmer Theologische Erklärung) was a document adopted by Christians in Nazi Germany who opposed the German Christian movement. In the view of the delegates to the Synod that met in the city of Wuppertal-Barmen in May 1934, the German Christians had corrupted church government by making it subservient to the state and had introduced Nazi ideology into the German Protestant churches that contradicted the Christian gospel.

The Barmen Declaration includes six theses:

1. The only source of revelation is the Word of God — Jesus Christ. Any other possible sources (earthly powers, for example) will not be accepted.
2. Jesus Christ is the only Lord of all aspects of personal life. There should be no other authority.
3. The message and order of the church should not be influenced by the current political convictions.
4. Leadership in the church is not dominion, it is in service of its ministry entrusted to all its members; there can be no special leader ("Führer") apart from that ministry (Mt 20, 25f).
5. The state should not fulfill the task of the church and vice versa. State and church are both limited to their own business.
6. Therefore, the Barmen Declaration rejects (i) the subordination of the Church to the state (8.22–3) and (ii) the subordination of the Word and Spirit to the Church.

"8.27 We reject the false doctrine, as though the Church in human arrogance could place the Word and work of the Lord in the service of any arbitrarily chosen desires, purposes, and plans."

On the contrary, the Declaration proclaims that the Church "is solely Christ's property, and that it lives and wants to live solely from his comfort and from his direction in the expectation of his appearance." (8.17) Rejecting domestication of the Word in the Church, the Declaration points to the inalienable Lordship of Jesus Christ by the Spirit and to the external character of church unity which "can come only from the Word of God in faith through the Holy Spirit. Thus alone is the Church renewed" (8.01).

8.04 Try the spirits whether they are of God! Prove also the words of the Confessional Synod of the German Evangelical Church to see whether they agree with Holy Scripture and with the Confessions of the Fathers. If you find that we are speaking contrary to Scripture, then do not listen to us! But if you find that we are taking our stand upon Scripture, then let no fear or temptation keep you from treading with us the path of faith and obedience to the Word of God, in order that God's people be of one mind upon earth and that we in faith experience what he himself has said: "I will never leave you, nor forsake you." Therefore, "Fear not, little flock, for it is your Father's good pleasure to give you the kingdom.

The Declaration was mostly written by the Reformed theologian Karl Barth but underwent modification, especially with the introduction of its fifth article (on the two kingdoms), as a result of input from several Lutheran theologians.

The document became the chief confessional document of the 'Confessing Church'. The ecumenical nature of the Declaration can be seen by its inclusion in the Book of Confessions of the Presbyterian Church (USA) and the Book of Order of the worldwide Moravian Unity, the Unitas Fratrum.

One of the main purposes of the Declaration was to establish a three-church confessional consensus opposing pro-Nazi "German Christianity". These three churches were Lutheran, Reformed, and United.

== See also ==
- Dietrich Bonhoeffer
- Martin Niemöller

== Sources ==
- Douglas, J. D. (1988). Wright, David D.; Ferguson, Sinclair B. (eds.). New Dictionary of Theology. Downers Grove, IL: Inter-Varsity Press. p. 76. ISBN 0-85110-636-6.
