= Stuttgart Declaration of Guilt =

1945 declaration issued by the Council of the Protestant Church in Germany

The Stuttgart Declaration of Guilt (German: Stuttgarter Schuldbekenntnis) was a declaration issued on October 19, 1945, by the Council of the Protestant Church in Germany (Evangelischen Kirche in Deutschland, EKD), in which it confessed guilt for its inadequacies in opposition to the Nazis and the Third Reich.

== Text ==
The Declaration states in part:

Through us infinite wrong was brought over many peoples and countries. That which we often testified to in our communities, we express now in the name of the whole church: We did fight for long years in the name of Jesus Christ against the mentality that found its awful expression in the National Socialist regime of violence; but we accuse ourselves for not standing to our beliefs more courageously, for not praying more faithfully, for not believing more joyously, and for not loving more ardently.

The Declaration makes no mention of any particular atrocities committed during the Third Reich or of the church's support for Hitler during the early years of the regime.

One of the initiators of the declaration was pastor Martin Niemöller.

== History ==
After the EKD conference at Treysa achieved some administrative unity, critics still found a lack of contrition in the church. Niemoller stated, with some frustration, that "you should have seen this self-satisfied church at Treysa."

American representatives reporting from the Treysa conference voiced views similar to Niemoller. Robert Murphy, a career diplomat in the US State Department, commented:

There is little evidence that the German Protestant church repented Germany's war of aggression or the cruelties visited upon other peoples and countries.

Other Americans were perhaps more diplomatic in their statements but the meaning was no doubt the same:

It cannot be said that the attitude of the church toward its political responsibility is as yet satisfactory, let alone clear.—Stuart Herman

The Declaration was prepared in response to church representatives from the Netherlands, Switzerland, France, Britain and the US who came to Stuttgart to reestablish ties with the German Protestant Church, based on a "relationship of trust." The representatives believed that any relationship would fall apart in the absence of a statement by the German churchmen, due to the hatred felt in their home countries toward Germany in 1945.

But the eleven members of the council had differing ideas on the moral responsibility of their churches for Nazi Germany. One prepared a draft laying blame on "our fellow citizens" in Germany, thus implicitly denying or diffusing the responsibility of the church. This language was stricken from the draft, and Niemoller insisted on the language "Through us infinite wrong was brought over many peoples and countries."

...Hans Asmussen, Martin Niemöller... and Wilhelm Niesel ... needed no prodding to express lament over their own and the church's failure to speak out loudly and clearly against Nazism. Nevertheless, the Stuttgart Declaration was not simply an act of conscience. Persistent pressure by foreign church leaders for ... recognition of the ... inadequate response to Nazism played a significant role.

== Reactions ==
Many Germans viewed the Declaration as a further capitulation to the Allies and a betrayal of German interests; one signatory asked the foreign churchmen to refrain from publishing the Declaration, entirely contrary to the purpose of obtaining it in the first place. Various interpretations and arguments were raised by some members of the EKD Council to try to deflect the criticisms raised against them by irate parishioners:

- that the Declaration was merely an internal church document that did not attempt to address political guilt for the war;
- that only the German leadership had to be ashamed; or
- that it was not traitorous to confess guilt.

Of the eleven signatories, only Niemöller chose to publicize it: "For the next two years", he claimed, "I did nothing but preach the Declaration to people." This bold approach, along with his internment at Dachau, helped create his controversial reputation.

== Effects ==
Many Germans objected to the confession of guilt, on the ground that they had also suffered in the war, as a result of Allied wrongdoing (particularly Soviet).

...the dreadful misery of 1945-1946 held the Germans back from all remorse. Because—most people believed this—the occupation troops were responsible for the misery. "They're just as inhuman as we were", was how it was put. And with that, everything was evened up.

Some Germans quickly drew comparisons to the "war guilt" clause of the Versailles Treaty, as the Declaration admitted that there was a "solidarity of guilt" among the German people for the endless suffering wrought by Germany. They feared that, once again, the victors would use such logic to impose punishment upon Germany, as Versailles had widely been viewed after the conclusion of World War I.

Furthermore, was "solidarity of guilt" a code word for "collective guilt"—the notion, advocated by some of the more hawkish Allied spokesmen, that all Germans (except the active resistance) bore all responsibility for the Nazi crimes, whether or not they had personally participated in atrocities. The Declaration did not expressly stipulate collective guilt, but neither did it expressly adopt the more moderate doctrine that guilt and responsibility, like all things human, were generally matters of degree.

Niesel, a former student of Karl Barth and one of the signatories of the Declaration, concluded that there was a general unwillingness by the German people to accept responsibility for the Nazi rule. As Hockenos puts it:

The righteous intermingling of self-justification and self-pity was as important a factor in creating a hostile environment for a public confession as were postwar fears of another Versailles or Allied charges of collective guilt.

One German churchman reflected on his contacts with his Swiss church comrades as those were renewed after the war; they had remained in contact even during the war, but there were boundaries still to overcome after the war's end. His reflections are revealing, both for the revelation and articulation of those boundaries and of his own post-war attitude of "helplessness" in the face of totalitarianism, his underlying premise that individual Germans could do nothing because the obstacles imposed by Nazi totalitarianism were simply too great, so the clergy had no choice but to collaborate:

The accusation [from the Swiss] was that we [the German churchmen] had survived.... for them that was treachery. They couldn't understand that, under a totalitarian system, one has to make compromises... one has to have a certain flexibility... they couldn't understand any of this. [Eventually there was mutual understanding and]... I was elected by the Swiss delegates to the governing council.... me, as a German!"... That moved me greatly... the bridge was truly there again.

Many Germans raised the practical objection that the Declaration would be interpreted by the Allies as an expression of collective guilt, which would in turn justify harsh treatment by the Allies in the postwar world. Most Protestants were willing to admit some degree of responsibility, provided that the Allies reciprocated and admitted at least some wrongdoing in their liberation campaign.

In letter after letter [to the signatories] the same cry of resentment [against the Allies] is heard. To most Germans the suffering [of defeat and postwar conditions] itself was punishment enough for whatever share of guilt Germans bore....since the Allies also committed war crimes, this fact should somehow lessen the gravity of the crimes committed by Germany.

Others, who saw the Declaration more in theological than in practical or political terms, recognized that confession is made before God and not before men, and that such "conditional confessions" were theologically wrong-headed and misunderstood the meaning of Christian confession. As one Protestant rather wryly noted, neither the Allies nor the World Council of Churches "are our father confessor."

Hockenos identifies three basic reasons that Germans were reluctant to confess wrongdoing:

- Many Germans had in fact supported the Nazis and were in fact unrepentant. Their racist and nationalist mentality was intact, perhaps even heightened by the defeat which triggered feelings of anger and resentment.
- The nature and extent of the Nazi barbarities was difficult to comprehend, even for some of those who participated in them. Bystanders were reluctant to take responsibility for a campaign that was, in both quantitative and moral terms, nearly incomprehensible.
- Germans were also suffering, and they naturally gave priority to their own suffering.

== See also ==
- Darmstädter Wort
- Dietrich Bonhoeffer
- Warschauer Kniefall
- Theophil Wurm
- Denazification § Responsibility and collective guilt
