= Martin Niemöller =

German theologian and pastor (1892–1984)

The Reverend Martin Niemöller
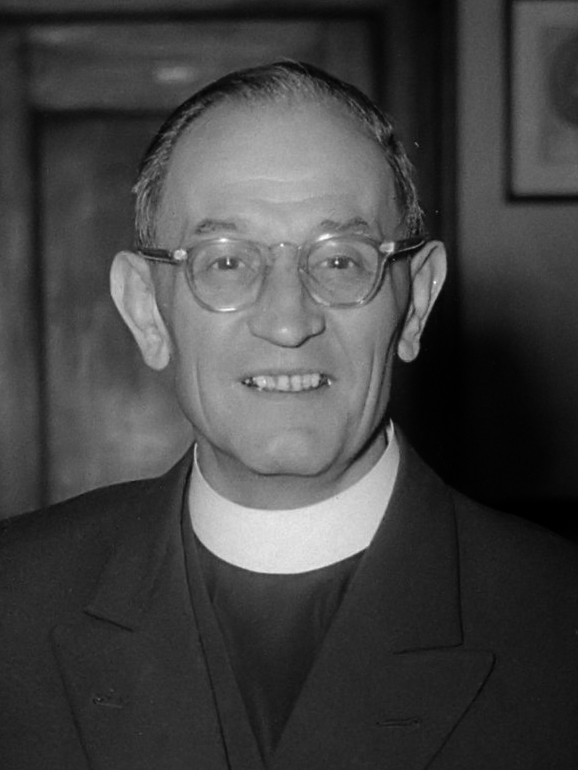
- Niemöller at St. James' Church, The Hague in 1952
- Born: Friedrich Gustav Emil Martin Niemöller; 14 January 1892; Lippstadt, German Empire
- Died: 6 March 1984 (aged 92); Wiesbaden, West Germany
- Education: Westphalian Wilhelm University
- Known for: Co-founding the Confessing Church
- Notable work: "First they came…"
- Spouse(s): Else Bremer (m. 1919; died 1961); Sibylle von Sell (m. 1971)

Ecclesiastical career
- Religion: Christianity (Lutheran)
- Church: Evangelical Church of the old-Prussian Union; Protestant Church in Hesse and Nassau; Confessing Church; Protestant Church in Germany
- Ordained: 1924
- Congregations: St. Anne's Church, Dahlem
- Offices held: President of the Evangelical Church in Hesse and Nassau (1945–1961); President of the World Council of Churches (1961–1968)
- Military career
- Branch: Imperial German Navy
- Service years: 1910–1919
- Conflicts: First World War: U-boat campaign
- Awards: Iron Cross

Friedrich Gustav Emil Martin Niemöller (German: [ˈmaʁtiːn ˈniːmœlɐ]; 14 January 1892 – 6 March 1984) was a German theologian and Lutheran pastor. He opposed the Nazi regime during the late 1930s, and was sent to a concentration camp for his affiliation with the Confessing Church and his opposition to state involvement in Church. After the war, he went on tour around the world to condemn the Nazi cause and educate people about the importance of human rights. In 1946 he published the confessional piece "First They Came".

Niemöller was a national conservative and initially a supporter of Adolf Hitler, and was a a self-identified antisemite. He became one of the founders of the Confessing Church, which opposed the Nazification of German Protestant churches. He opposed the Nazis' Aryan Paragraph. For his opposition to the Nazis' state control of the churches, Niemöller was imprisoned in Sachsenhausen concentration camp and Dachau concentration camps from 1938 to 1945. He narrowly escaped execution.

After his imprisonment, Niemöller expressed his deep regret about not having done enough to help victims of the Nazis. He turned away from his earlier nationalistic beliefs and was one of the initiators of the Stuttgart Declaration of Guilt. From the 1950s on, he was a vocal pacifist and anti-war activist, and vice-chair of War Resisters' International from 1966 to 1972. He met with Ho Chi Minh during the Vietnam War and was a committed campaigner for nuclear disarmament.

== Early life and education ==
Niemöller was born in Lippstadt, the Prussian Province of Westphalia (now in North Rhine-Westphalia), on 14 January 1892 to the Lutheran pastor Heinrich Niemöller and his wife Pauline (née Müller), and grew up in a very conservative home. In 1900, the family moved to Elberfeld where he finished school, taking his Abitur exam in 1908.

== World War I ==
Niemöller began a career as an officer of the Imperial Navy of the German Empire, and his first assignment was as cadet on the cruiser SMS Hertha after which he served on the battleship SMS Thüringen. In 1915, was assigned to the U-boat branch. In October of that year, he joined the submarine mother ship Vulkan, followed by training on the submarine U-3. In February 1916, he became second officer on U-73, which was assigned to the Mediterranean in April 1916. There the submarine fought on the Saloniki front, patrolled in the Strait of Otranto and from December 1916 onward, planted many mines in front of Port Said and was involved in commerce raiding. Flying a French flag as a ruse of war, the SM U-73 sailed past British warships and torpedoed two Allied troopships and a British man-of-war.

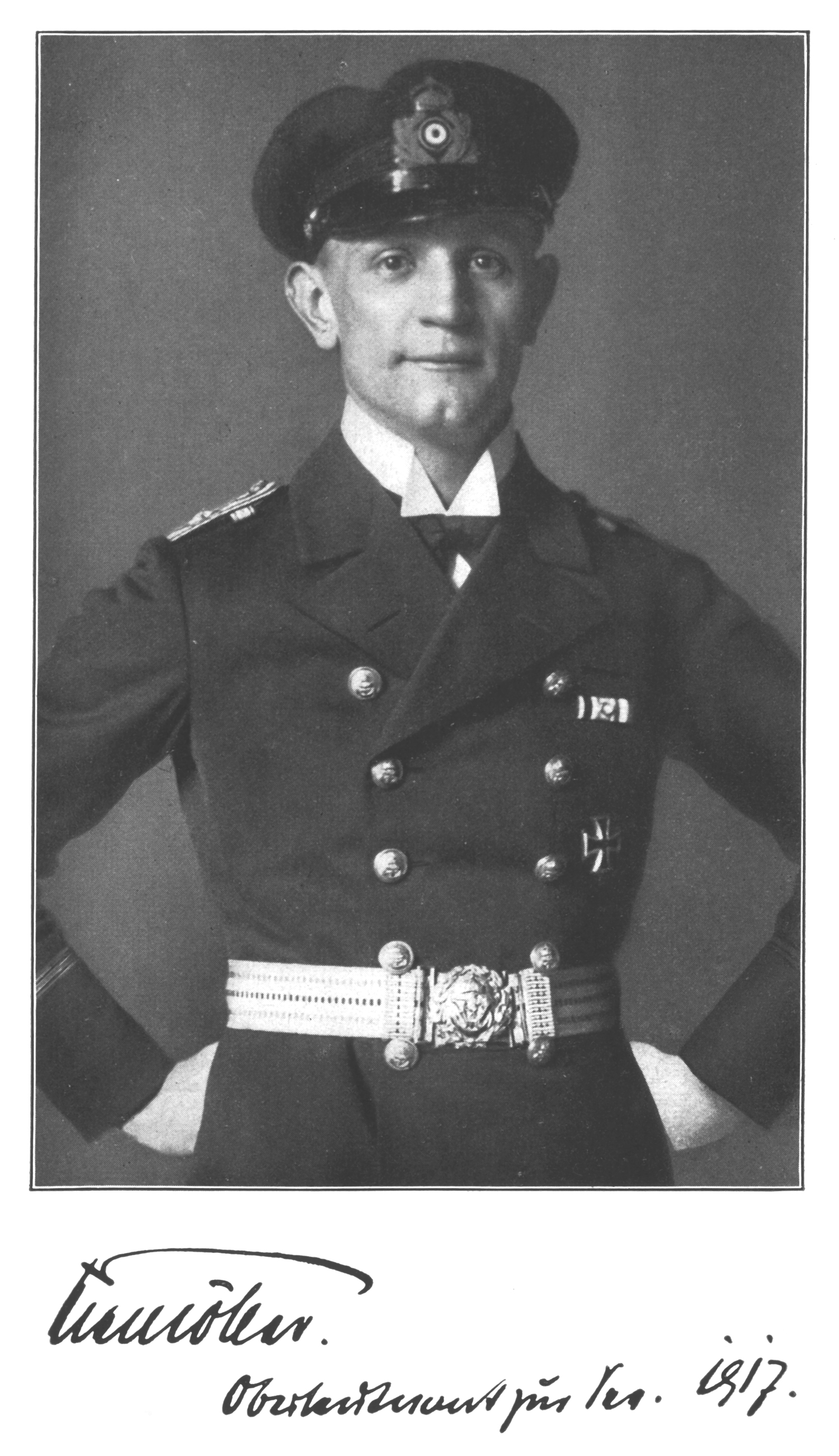
Niemöller as an officer of the Imperial German Navy, 1917

In January 1917, Niemöller was the navigator of U-39. Later he returned to Kiel, and in August 1917, he became first officer on U-151, which attacked numerous ships at Gibraltar, in the Bay of Biscay, and other places. During this time, the SM U-151 crew set a record by sinking 55,000 tons of Allied ships in 115 days at sea. In June 1918, he became commander of the UC-67. Under his command, UC-67 achieved a temporary closing of the French port of Marseille by sinking ships in the area, by torpedoes, and by the laying of mines.

For his achievements, Niemöller was awarded the Iron Cross First Class. When the war drew to a close, he decided to become a preacher, a story he later recounted in his book Vom U-Boot zur Kanzel (From U-boat to Pulpit). At war's end, Niemöller resigned his commission, as he rejected the new democratic government of the German Empire that formed after the abdication of the German Emperor Wilhelm II.

== Interwar period ==
In 1919, Niemöller married Else Bremer (20 July 1890 – 7 August 1961). That same year, he began working at a farm in Wersen near Osnabrück but gave up becoming a farmer as he could not afford to buy his own farm. He subsequently pursued his earlier idea of becoming a Lutheran pastor and studied Protestant theology at the Westphalian Wilhelm University in Münster from 1919 to 1923. His motivation was his ambition to give a disordered society meaning and order through the Gospel and church bodies. During the Ruhr Uprising in 1920, he was battalion commander of the "III. Bataillon der Akademischen Wehr Münster" belonging to the paramilitary Freikorps.

=== Ordainment as pastor ===
Niemöller was ordained on 29 June 1924. Subsequently, the united Evangelical Church of the old-Prussian Union appointed him curate of Münster's Church of the Redeemer. After serving as the superintendent of the Inner Mission in the old-Prussian ecclesiastical province of Westphalia, Niemöller in 1931 became pastor of the Jesus Christus Kirche (comprising a congregation together with St. Anne's Church) in Dahlem, an affluent suburb of Berlin.

=== Early support for Nazi Germany ===
Like most Protestant pastors, Niemöller was a national conservative, and openly supported the conservative opponents of the Weimar Republic. He voted for Nazis in 1924, 1928, and 1933. He thus welcomed Hitler's accession to power in 1933, believing that it would bring a national revival. In his autobiography, From U-Boat to Pulpit published in the spring of 1933, he called the time of "the System" (a pejorative name for the Weimar Republic) the "years of darkness" and hailed Hitler for beginning a "national revival". Niemöller's autobiography received positive reviews in Nazi newspapers and was a bestseller.

=== Gradual opposition to Nazism ===
Niemöller decidedly opposed the Nazis' "Aryan Paragraph" to Jewish converts to Lutheranism. The Nazi regime reacted with mass arrests and charges against almost 800 pastors and ecclesiastical lawyers. Also in 1933, Niemöller founded the Pfarrernotbund, an organization of pastors to "combat rising discrimination against Christians of Jewish background". By the autumn of 1934, Niemöller joined other Lutheran and Protestant churchmen such as Karl Barth and Dietrich Bonhoeffer in founding the Confessing Church, a Protestant group that opposed the Nazification of the German Protestant churches. Author and Nobel Prize laureate Thomas Mann published Niemöller's sermons in the United States and praised his bravery.

Niemöller only gradually abandoned his national conservative views. Even as he opposed the Nazis, he made pejorative remarks about Jews of faith while protecting – in his own church – baptised Christians of Jewish descent whom the Nazis persecuted. In one sermon in 1935, he remarked: "What is the reason for [their] obvious punishment, which has lasted for thousands of years? Dear brethren, the reason is easily given: the Jews brought the Christ of God to the cross!"

This has led to controversy regarding his attitude toward Jews and to accusations of anti-Judaism. The Holocaust historian Robert Michael argues that Niemöller's statements were a result of traditional antisemitism, and that Niemöller agreed with the Nazis' position on the "Jewish question" at that time. American sociologist Werner Cohn lived as a Jew in Nazi Germany, and he also reports on antisemitic statements by Niemöller. Niemöller said, "The crucial issue was not whether the USA or the USSR would win the next war. The big question rather was whether there would still be a white race in thirty or forty years." In her book Twisted Cross, Doris L. Bergen says, "Martin Niemöller explained how he, a self-professed antisemite, had come to oppose plans to exclude non-Aryans from the clergy. Even his personal antipathy toward Jews, Niemöller indicated, had not blinded him to the realization that acceptance of an Aryan clause in the church would effectively negate the teaching of baptism."

In 1936, he signed the petition of a group of Protestant churchmen which sharply criticized Nazi policies and declared the Aryan Paragraph incompatible with the Christian virtue of charity.

== Imprisonment ==
Niemöller was arrested on 1 July 1937. On 2 March 1938, he was tried by a "Special Court" for activities against the state. He was given Sonder- und Ehrenhaft status ('special or honourable detention'). He received a 2,000 Reichsmark fine and seven months' imprisonment. But as he had been detained pre-trial for longer than the seven-month jail term, he was released by the court after sentencing. However, he was immediately rearrested by Himmler's Gestapo. He was interned in Sachsenhausen and Dachau concentration camps for "protective custody" from 1938 to 1945.

While in the concentration camp, Niemöller "wrote to a military commander whom he had known in World War I asking to be released from Sachsenhausen so he could serve in the German Wehrmacht." He volunteered in September 1939 to become a U-boat commander; his offer was rejected. His former cellmate, Leo Stein, was released from Sachsenhausen to go to America, and he wrote an article about Niemöller for The National Jewish Monthly in 1941. Stein reports having asked Niemöller why he ever supported the Nazi Party, to which Niemöller replied:

I find myself wondering about that too. I wonder about it as much as I regret it. Still, it is true that Hitler betrayed me. I had an audience with him, as a representative of the Protestant Church, shortly before he became Chancellor, in 1932. Hitler promised me on his word of honor, to protect the Church, and not to issue any anti-Church laws. He also agreed not to allow pogroms against the Jews, assuring me as follows: "There will be restrictions against the Jews, but there will be no ghettos, no pogroms, in Germany."

I really believed, given the widespread anti-Semitism in Germany, at that time – that Jews should avoid aspiring to Government positions or seats in the Reichstag. There were many Jews, especially among the Zionists, who took a similar stand. Hitler's assurance satisfied me at the time. On the other hand, I hated the growing atheistic movement, which was fostered and promoted by the Social Democrats and the Communists. Their hostility toward the Church made me pin my hopes on Hitler for a while.

I am paying for that mistake now; and not me alone, but thousands of other persons like me.

In late April 1945, Niemöller – together with about 140 high-ranking prisoners – was transported to the Alpenfestung. The group possibly were to be used as hostages in surrender negotiations. The transport's SS guards had orders to kill everyone if liberation by the advancing Western Allies became imminent. However, in the South Tyrol region, regular German troops took the inmates into protective custody.

=== Liberation ===
The entire group was eventually liberated by advanced units of the U.S. Seventh Army.

== Later life ==
In 1947, Niemöller was denied Nazi victim status. Niemöller himself acknowledged his guilt. In 1959, he was asked about his former attitude toward Jews by Alfred Wiener, a Jewish researcher into racism and war crimes committed by the Nazi regime. In a letter to Wiener, Niemöller stated that his eight-year imprisonment by the Nazis became the turning point in his life, after which he viewed things differently. He went on tour around the world to condemn the Nazi cause and educate people about why it is important to protect human rights.

Niemöller was president of the Protestant Church in Hesse and Nassau from 1947 to 1961. He was one of the initiators of the Stuttgart Declaration of Guilt, signed by leading figures in the German Protestant churches. The document acknowledged that the churches had not done enough to resist the Nazis. Under the impact of a meeting with Otto Hahn (referred to as the "father of nuclear chemistry") in July 1954, Niemöller became an ardent pacifist and campaigner for nuclear disarmament. He was soon a leading figure in the post-war German peace movement and was even brought to court in 1959 because he had spoken about the military in a very unflattering way. His visit to North Vietnam's communist ruler Ho Chi Minh at the height of the Vietnam War caused an uproar. Niemöller also took active part in protests against the Vietnam War and the NATO Double-Track Decision.

Niemöller was one of the signatories of the agreement to convene a convention for drafting a world constitution. As a result, for the first time in human history, a World Constituent Assembly convened to draft and adopt a Constitution for the Federation of Earth. In 1961, he became president of the World Council of Churches. He was awarded the Lenin Peace Prize in December 1966. He gave a sermon at the 30 April 1967 dedication of a Protestant "Church of Atonement" in the former Dachau concentration camp, which in 1965 had been partially restored as a memorial site.

=== Death ===
Niemöller died at Wiesbaden, West Germany, on 6 March 1984, at the age of 92.

== Selected works ==
- Gedanken über den Weg der christlichen Kirche, Gütersloh: Gütersloher Verlagshaus 2019 (edited by Alf Christophersen and Benjamin Ziemann). ISBN 978-3-579-08544-9
- From U-boat to Pulpit, including an Appendix From Pulpit to Prison by Henry Smith Leiper (Chicago, New York: Willett, Clark, 1937).
- Here Stand I! with foreword by James Moffatt, translated by Jane Lymburn (Chicago, New York: Willett, Clark, 1937).
- The Gestapo Defied, Being the Last Twenty-eight Sermons by Martin Niemöller (London [etc.]: W. Hodge and Company, Limited, 1941).
- Of Guilt and Hope, translated by Renee Spodheim (New York: Philosophical Library, [1947]).
- "What is the Church?" Princeton Seminary Bulletin, vol. 40, no. 4 (1947): 10–16.
- "The Word of God is Not Bound", Princeton Seminary Bulletin, vol. 41, no. 1 (1947): 18–23.
- Exile in the Fatherland: Martin Niemöller's Letters from Moabit Prison, translated by Ernst Kaemke, Kathy Elias, and Jacklyn Wilfred; edited by Hubert G. Locke (Grand Rapids, Mich.: W.B. Eerdmans Pub. Co., c1986).
- "Dachau Sermons", Martin Niemöller, translated by Robert H. Pfeiffer, Harvard Divinity School 1947 (published by Latimer House Limited, 33 Ludgate Hill, London EC4)

== See also ==
- List of peace activists
- Franz Hildebrandt
- Deutsches Historisches Museum
