= Hornig =

Hornig is a surname. Notable people with the surname include:

- Carola Hornig (born 1962), German rower
- Charles Hornig (1916–1999), one of the earliest contributors to the science fiction genre
- Donald Hornig (1920–2013), American chemist, explosives expert, pushed the button on Trinity, teacher and presidential science advisor
- Ernst Hornig (1894–1976), German Bishop of the Evangelical Church of Silesia
- Florian Hörnig (born 1986), German footballer
- Heinz Hornig (born 1937), former German football player
- Irina Hornig, skydiver who competed for the SC Dynamo Hoppegarten/ Sportvereinigung (SV) Dynamo
- Joan Hornig, American jewelry designer
- Johannes Hörnig (1921–2001), East German politician
- Károly Hornig (1840–1917), Austrian-Hungarian Cardinal of the Roman Catholic Church
- Lilli Hornig (1921–2017), American chemist involved in the Manhattan Project, and feminist
- Mady Hornig (born 1957), psychiatrist, associate professor of epidemiology at Columbia University
- Manuel Hornig (born 1982), German football player
- Rudi Hornig (1938–2014), German boxer
- Sabine Hornig (born 1964), German visual artist and photographer who lives and works in Berlin

== See also ==
- Honig
- Hornick (disambiguation)
- Hornigi
- Hornik
- Horniki
- Horning
