= Hornik =

Horník (feminine: Horníková) is a Czech and Slovak surname, meaning 'miner'. Hornik is an Anglicised form of the surname. Notable people with the surname include:

- David Hornik, American venture capitalist and philanthropist
- Freddie Hornik (1944–2009), Czech-born British fashion entrepreneur
- Gottfried Hornik (born 1940), Austrian operatic baritone
- Jacob Hornik (born 1942), Israeli professor in marketing and communications
- Miloš Horník (born 1990), Slovak volleyball player
- P. David Hornik (born 1954), American-born writer and translator living in Israel

== See also ==
- Horníček
