= F. K. Otto Dibelius =

German Protestant bishop (1880–1967)

His Eminence Friedrich Karl Otto Dibelius
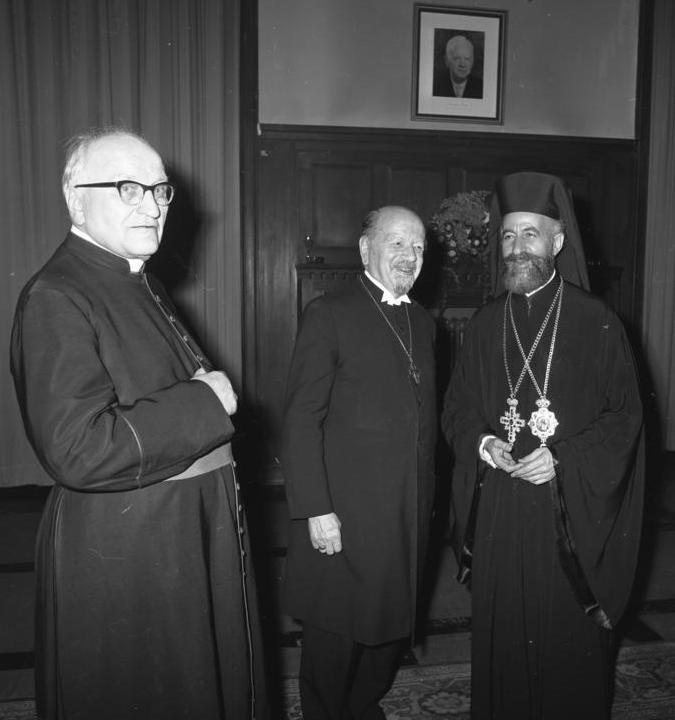
- Dibelius, in the middle, with Makarios III (right), president of Cyprus, and Prelate Tukowsky (left)
- Church: Evangelical Church in Germany
- Diocese: Berlin
- See: Chairman of the Council of the Evangelical Church in Germany
- Installed: 1949
- Term ended: 1961
- Predecessor: Theophil Wurm
- Successor: Kurt Scharf

Personal details
- Born: 15 May 1880 Berlin, Kingdom of Prussia, German Empire
- Died: 31 January 1967 (aged 86) West Berlin, West Germany
- Denomination: Evangelism
- Education: Humboldt University of Berlin

Friedrich Karl Otto Dibelius (15 May 1880 – 31 January 1967) was a German bishop of the Evangelical Church in Berlin-Brandenburg, a self-described anti-Semite and up to 1934 a conservative, who became a staunch opponent of Nazism and communism.

== Early years ==
He was born in Berlin, Brandenburg, in 1880. One of his cousins was the Protestant theologian Martin Dibelius. From 1899 to 1903 he studied at the Frederick William University of Berlin. He received his PhD in 1902. From 1904–1906, he studied at the Preachers' Seminary in Wittenberg.

== Early pastorates ==
He was then employed as a minister by the Evangelical State Church of Prussia's older Provinces. In 1906–1907, he was the assistant pastor at the Klosterkirche in Guben. In 1907–1909, he was the archdeacon at St. Mary's Church in Crossen an der Oder. In 1909–1910, he was the assistant pastor at the Church of Ss. Peter and Paul in Danzig. From 1911 to 1915, he was the chief pastor at Lauenburg in Pomerania. From 1915 to 1925, he was the pastor of the Heilsbronnen congregation in Berlin-Schöneberg. In 1918, he was the executive secretary (part-time) of the Mutual Trust Council in the Evangelical Supreme Ecclesiastical Council (German: Evangelischer Oberkirchenrat, EOK) of the Evangelical State Church in Prussia's older Provinces, which renamed after the separation of state and religion into Evangelical Church of the old-Prussian Union (APU) in 1922.

== General superintendent of Kurmark ==
In 1921 he was a member of the Evangelical Supreme Ecclesiastical Council (part-time). From 1925 to 1933 he was the superintendent-general of the Kurmark within the Old-Prussian Ecclesiastical Province of the March of Brandenburg. He then also became a member of the consistory, an administrative body, of that ecclesiastical province and joined the right-wing and anti-semite German National People's Party.

One problem was the spiritual vacuum which emerged after the church stopped being a state church with the separation of religion and state by the 1919 German Weimar Constitution. Dibelius published his book Das Jahrhundert der Kirche (The century of the Church), in which he declared the 20th century to be the era when the Evangelical Church may for the first time develop freely and gain the independence God would have wished for, without the burden and constraints of the state church function. He regarded the role of the church as even more important, since the government of the Weimar Republic – in his eyes – would no longer provide society with binding norms, so that this would be the task of the church.

The church would have to stand for the defence of the Christian culture of the Occident. In this respect Dibelius regarded himself as consciously anti-Jewish, explaining in a circular to the pastors in his general superintendency district of Kurmark, "I have always considered myself an anti-Semite. It cannot be denied that with all degenerating phenomena of modern civilisation Judaism plays a leading role". His book was one of the most read on church matters in that period.

On 21 March 1933 the newly elected Reichstag convened in Potsdam's Evangelical Garrison Church, an event commemorated as the Day of Potsdam, and Dibelius, then the locally competent General-Superintendent, did the relevant preaching in front of the Protestant members of the Reichstag in St. Nicholas' Church, Potsdam, in the morning. On 1 April 1933 the Nazi regime organized a boycott of Jewish shops and on 4 April Dibelius wrote in Berlin's Evangelisches Sonntagsblatt that "the last fifteen years in Germany" had "strengthened Jewry's influence to an extraordinary degree. The number of Jewish judges, Jewish politicians and Jewish civil servants in influential positions has grown measurably". He downplayed the boycott of enterprises of Jewish proprietors and such of Gentiles of Jewish descent, when SA members stood outside Jewish shops attempting to enforce the boycott through intimidation, and when swastikas and anti-Jewish slogans were painted on shop-windows. In an address for US radio he commended the restraint shown in the boycott, with "only one single bloody incident" and he accepted the need for violence, hoping instead 'that the hour may soon come when violence is no longer necessary'. Even after this clearly anti-Semitic action he repeated in his circular to the pastors of Kurmark on the occasion of Easter (16 April 1933) his anti-Jewish attitude, giving the same words as in 1928.

== During the struggle of the churches ==
Once the Nazi government realised that the 28 Protestant church bodies in Germany were not to be streamlined from within using the Nazi-submissive German Christians faction within the church, they abolished the constitutional freedom of religion and religious organisation. The act was strictly opposed by Dibelius, who saw the separation of state and church as a prerequisite of the latter's free development to achieve its best role. On 24 June the Nazi Minister of Cultural Affairs, Bernhard Rust appointed August Jäger as Prussian State Commissioner for the Prussian Ecclesiastical Affairs (German: Staatskommissar für die preußischen kirchlichen Angelegenheiten). Jäger furloughed – among many others – Dibelius.

On 14 July, Adolf Hitler discretionarily decreed an unconstitutional premature re-election of all elders (German: Älteste or Presbyter) and synodals in all 28 Protestant church bodies in Germany for 23 July. The new synods of the 28 Protestant churches were to declare their dissolution as separate church bodies in favour of a united German Evangelical Church (German: Deutsche Evangelische Kirche). Representatives of all 28 Protestant churches were to attend the newly created National Synod to confirm the designated Ludwig Müller as the Reich's Bishop. Müller already now regarded himself as leader of this new organisation.

In the campaign for the premature re-election of all presbyters and synodals on 23 July the Nazi government sided with the German Christians. Under the impression of the government's partiality, the other existing lists of opposing candidates united to form the Evangelical Church list. The Gestapo (est. 26 April 1933) ordered the list to change its name and replace all its election posters and flyers issued under the forbidden name.

The Gestapo confiscated the office and the printing-press of the Evangelical Church list to hinder any reprint. Thus, the list, which had been renamed as Gospel and Church (German: Evangelium und Kirche), took refuge with the Evangelical Press Association (German: Evangelischer Preßverband), presided over by Dibelius and printed new election posters in its premises in Alte Jacobstraße # 129, Berlin. However, the German Christians gained 70–80% of the seats in presbyteries and synods. In 1933–34 Dibelius served the pastorate at San Remo, Italy.

After his return to Germany (July 1934) and after – from May to October 1934 – the intra-church opposition, the so-called Confessing Church, had built up its own organisational structures, circumventing the officially recognised bodies of the Old-Prussian church and the newly established Nazi-submissive German Evangelical Church, Dibelius served again as general superintendent in the Kurmark – ignoring his official furlough – accepted only by those congregations whose presbyteries rejected the Nazi adulterated official Old-Prussian church. From 1934 to 1945 he was a member of the March of Brandenburg provincial Councils of Brethren, the leading bodies established by the Confessing Church on all levels, such as deaneries, ecclesiastical provinces and for the overall Old-Prussian church as well as in other Nazi-subjected Protestant church bodies in Germany and on the Reich's level dubbing the position of Reich's Bishop Müller by the Reich's Council of Brethren.

== Rebuilding the Old-Prussian church and Berlin-Brandenburg ecclesiastical province ==
Before the end of World War II Dibelius addressed some moderate incumbents of leading positions in the official Old-Prussian church, in order to establish their acceptance and co-operation in a future provisional leading body – the so-called Beirat (advisory council) of the Old-Prussian church, once the Nazis were defeated. On 7 May 1945 Dibelius organised the forming of a provisional church executive for the Old-Prussian Ecclesiastical Province of the March of Brandenburg, comprising Greater Berlin and the political province of Brandenburg. The provisionally leading advisory council reconfirmed Dibelius as general superintendent of Kurmark and also commissioned him to serve per pro the vacant general superintendencies of Berlin and the New March and Lower Lusatia. The Soviet occupying power agreed that Dibelius would use the self-chosen title of Bishop, which was regarded a non-Protestant title and was rejected by many, especially since the Nazi-submissive German Christians used that title for their church leaders, claiming an intra-church hierarchy in the range of the Führerprinzip.

In June an overall provisional church executive, the Council of the Evangelical Church of the Old-Prussian Union (German: Rat der Evangelischen Kirche der altpreußischen Union) emerged, acting until December 1948 mostly in Central Germany, since traffic and communication between the German regions had collapsed. On 13 June 1945 the Old-Prussian ecclesiastical province of Westphalia under synodal Praeses Karl Koch unilaterally assumed independence as the Evangelical Church of Westphalia. Dibelius fought this and tried to maintain the unity of the Old-Prussian church.

On 15 July Heinrich Grüber was appointed Provost of St. Mary's and St. Nicholas' Church in Berlin and Dibelius invested him on 8 August in a ceremony in St. Mary's Church, only partially cleared of debris. In 1945 Dibelius became a member of the newly founded Christian Democratic Union party in Germany, which later split into the western CDU and the eastern puppet party CDU(D).

Theophil Wurm, Bishop of the Evangelical-Lutheran Church in Württemberg, invited representatives of all Protestant church bodies to Treysa (a part of today's Schwalmstadt) for 31 August 1945. The representatives of the six still existing Old-Prussian ecclesiastical provinces (March of Brandenburg, Pomerania, Rhineland, Saxony, Silesia, and Westphalia; the other three, located in the Former eastern territories of Germany had fallen under Polish and Soviet rule, newly annexed by Poland and the Soviet Union) and the central Old-Prussian Evangelical Supreme Ecclesiastical Council used the occasion to make fundamental decisions about the future of the Evangelical Church of the old-Prussian Union. The representatives decided to assume the independent existence of each ecclesiastical province and to reform the Evangelical Church of the old-Prussian Union into a mere umbrella organisation ("Neuordnung der Evangelischen Kirche der altpreußischen Union"). Dibelius and some Middle German representatives (the so-called Dibelians) could not assert themselves against Koch and his partisans, to maintain the Evangelical Church of the old-Prussian Union as an integrated church body. However, Dibelius assumed the position of president of the Old-Prussian Evangelical Supreme Ecclesiastical Council.

== President of the Evangelical Church in Germany umbrella ==
As to co-operation of all the Protestant church bodies in Germany, strong resentments prevailed, especially among the Lutheran church bodies of the Bavaria right of the river Rhine, the Hamburgian State, Hanover, Mecklenburg, the Free State of Saxony, and Thuringia, against any unification after the experiences during the Nazi reign with the German Evangelical Church. But it was decided to replace the pre-1933 German Federation of Protestant Churches with the new umbrella Evangelical Church in Germany, provisionally led by the Council of the Evangelical Church in Germany, a naming borrowed from the brethren council organisation. Beginning in 1949, Dibelius was chairman of the Council of the Evangelical Church in Germany.

In December 1946 Dibelius spent two weeks visiting prisoner-of-war camps in England, Scotland and Wales, a journey that had been made possible by the Control Commission for Germany and the Minister of State for War, at the request of Geoffrey Fisher, Archbishop of Canterbury. On Christmas Eve, at the invitation of Leslie Stannard Hunter, Bishop of Sheffield, he conducted a service at Sheffield Cathedral, attended by over 1,000 German prisoners of war.

== Bishop of the Evangelical Church in Berlin-Brandenburg ==
Until 1951 all the six still existing ecclesiastical provinces of the Evangelical Church of the old-Prussian Union assumed new church constitutions declaring their independence with Dibelius' local Ecclesiastical Province of the March of Brandenburg transforming into the independent Evangelical Church in Berlin-Brandenburg. Dibelius was elected its bishop in December 1948 by the synod constituting this newly independent church body, after the function of bishop had been officially established by the new church constitution.

In 1947 at a meeting of delegates of the six surviving ecclesiastical provinces they confirmed the status quo, with the Evangelical Church of the old-Prussian Union having transformed into a league of independent church bodies. The schism within the Old-Prussian church was not yet fully overcome, since only the most radical German Christians had been removed or had resigned from their positions. Many neutrals, forming the majority of clergy and parishioners, and many proponents of the quite doubtable compromising policy at the time of the struggle of the churches assumed positions.

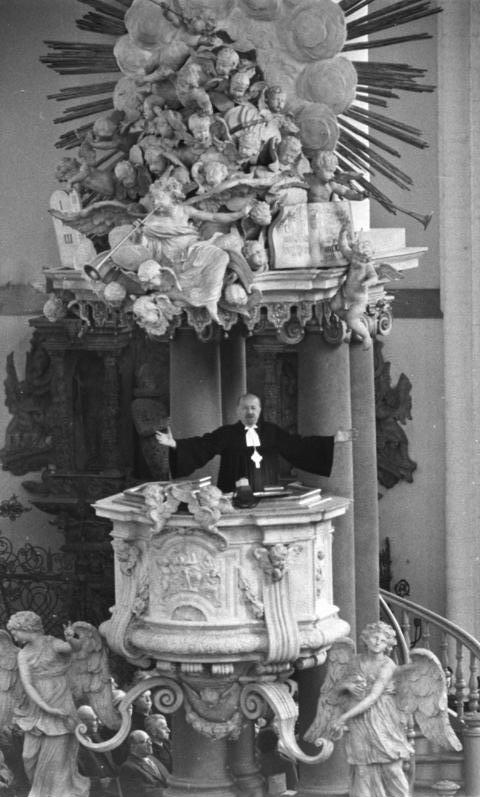
Otto Dibelius preaching from the pulpit (1703 by Andreas Schlüter) in St. Mary's Church, Berlin (East), 1959

It was Dibelius' policy to gain the mainstream support of parishioners. Thus the strict opposition of the Dahlemites and Barmensians, forming the uncompromised opposition of the Confessing Church during the struggle of the churches, continued to maintain their conventions in the Old-Prussian brethren councils. On 14 January 1949 representatives of the Evangelical Church of the old-Prussian Union decided to reconcile the groups and founded a committee to develop a new church constitution. On 15 August 1949 the Evangelical Supreme Ecclesiastical Council, presided over by Dibelius, issued the proposal of the committee for a new constitution, which would bring together the Westphalians striving for the complete unwinding of the Evangelical Church of the old-Prussian Union, the Dahlemites and Barmensians as well as the Dibelians.

The bulk of the mainstream parishioners shared a strong scepticism about, if not even objection to, communism, and so did Dibelius. So after the foundation of the German Democratic Republic (GDR) in the Soviet zone of occupation on 7 October 1949, including – apart from West Berlin the bulk of the territory covered by the Evangelical Church in Berlin-Brandenburg -, its Bishop Dibelius was often defamed in the East as the propagandist of the western Konrad Adenauer government. He was declared persona non-grata by the German Democratic Republic in 1960. After the construction of the Berlin Wall in 1961 the GDR refused to allow Dibelius to enter its territory and East Berlin.

On 24 February 1950 Dibelius – heading the Evangelical Supreme Ecclesiastical Council – invited for an extraordinary Old-Prussian General Synod, which convened on 11–13 December in Berlin. The new constitution (German: Ordnung der Evangelischen Kirche der altpreußischen Union) transformed the Evangelical Church of the old-Prussian Union into a mere umbrella and did away with the Evangelical Supreme Ecclesiastical Council, replacing it by the Church Chancery (German: Kirchenkanzlei), as administrative body. The new governing body, replacing the Church Senate led by the Praeses of the General Synod (de facto destroyed since 1933), became the Council of the Evangelical Church of the old-Prussian Union.

The heads of the church body, in office for a term of two years, now bore the title President of the Council (German: Vorsitzende(r) des Rates der Evangelischen Kirche der altpreußischen Union). Until the appointment of the first head in 1952 Dibelius, the former president of the Evangelical Supreme Ecclesiastical Council, and its other members officiated per pro as the head and members of the church chancery.

Beginning in 1954 he was the president of the World Council of Churches (part-time). He died in 1967 in Berlin (West).

== Works ==
- Dibelius, Otto, Das Jahrhundert der Kirche: Geschichte, Betrachtung, Umschau und Ziele, Berlin: Furche-Verlag, 1927. No ISBN
- Dibelius, Otto, In the Service of the Lord, London: Faber and Faber, 1964 [1961].
