= Markus Dröge =

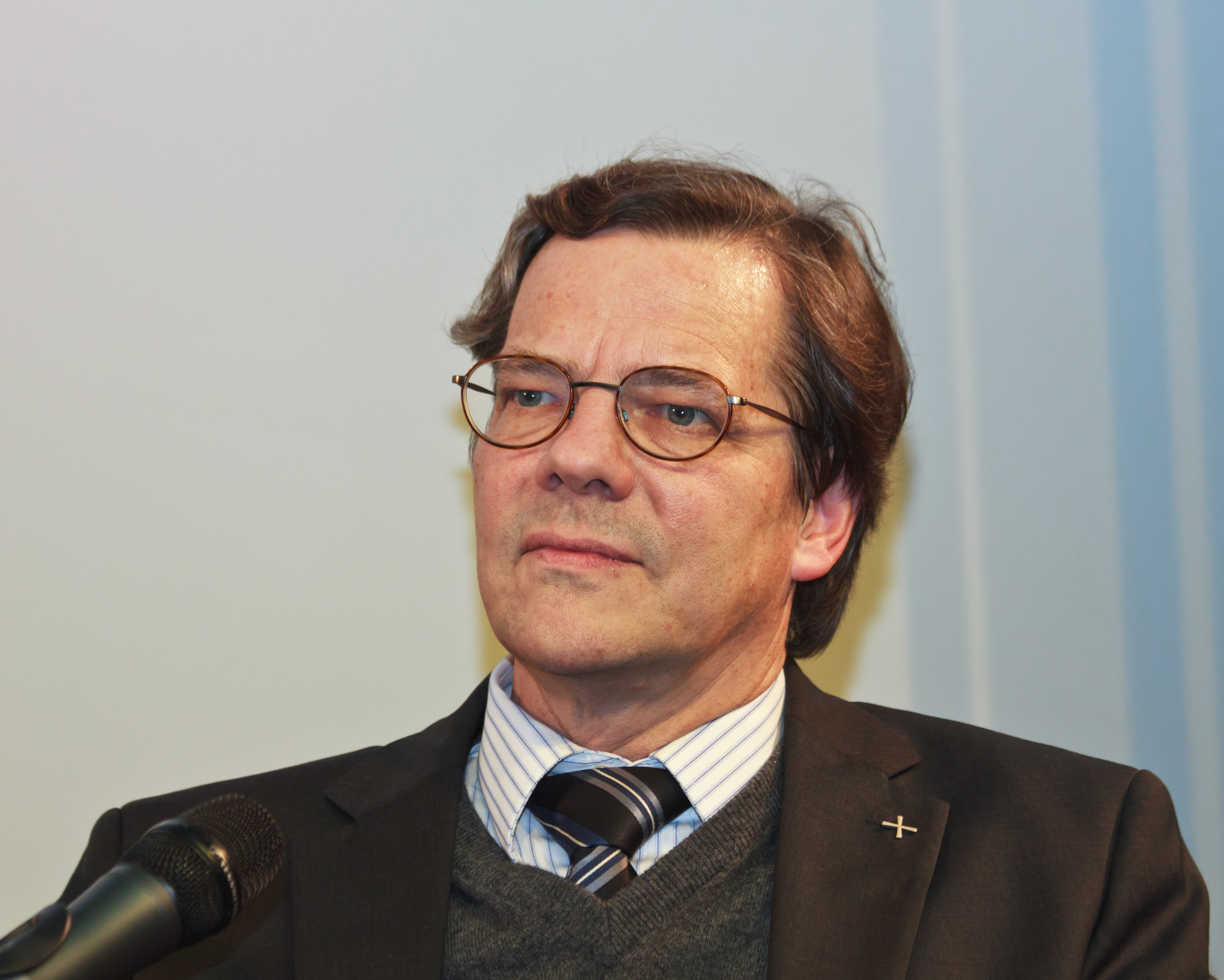
In 2013

Markus Dröge (born 16 October 1954 in Washington, D.C.) is a German theologian and was from 2009 until 2019 bishop of the Evangelical Church Berlin-Brandenburg-Silesian Upper Lusatia (EKBO).

== Career ==
Dröge studied Theology at the universities of Bonn, Munich and Tübingen. After completing a doctorate in Theology in 1999 he taught Systematic theology at the University of Koblenz and Landau. He was elected bishop by the Synod of the EKBO on 15 May 2009. On 14 November 2009 he was invested as bishop of the EKBO at St. Mary's Church, Berlin, succeeding Wolfgang Huber, who retired.

Upon being elected Dröge was superintendent of the Koblenz district in the Evangelical Church in the Rhineland since 2004. He was succeeded by Rolf Stahl in 2009.

== Other activities ==
- Leo Baeck Foundation, Member of the Board of Trustees

== Personal life ==
Dröge is married and has three children.

== Works ==
- Kirche in der Vielfalt des Geistes. Die christologische und pneumatologische Begründung der Kirche bei Jürgen Moltmann. Neukirchen-Vluyn, 2000.
