= Dröge =

Dröge is a surname. Notable people with the surname include:

- Gert-Jan Dröge (1943–2007), Dutch television presenter
- Katharina Dröge (born 1984), German politician
- Markus Dröge (born 1954), German Lutheran bishop

== See also ==
- Pete Droge (born 1969), American musician
- Wolfgang Droege (1949–2005), Canadian white supremacist
