= Evangelical Church Berlin - Brandenburg - Silesian Upper Lusatia =

Protestant regional church

The Evangelical Church Berlin - Brandenburg - Silesian Upper Lusatia (German: Evangelische Kirche Berlin-Brandenburg-schlesische Oberlausitz, EKBO) is a United Protestant church body in the German states of Brandenburg, Berlin and a part of Saxony (historical region of Silesian Upper Lusatia).

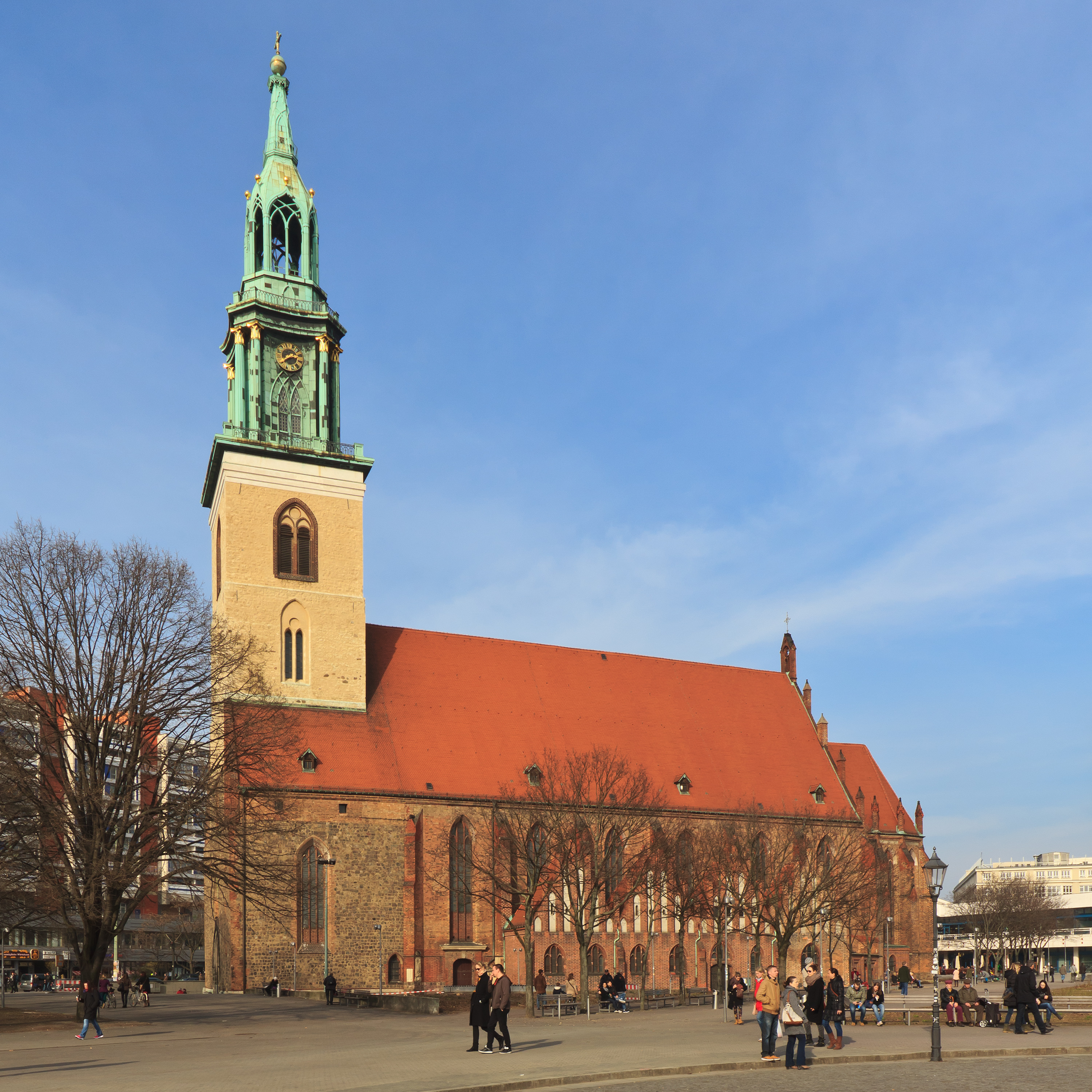
Marien Church in Berlin

The seat of the church is in Berlin. It is a full member of the Evangelical Church in Germany (German: Evangelische Kirche in Deutschland - EKD), and is a church of the Prussian Union. The leader of the church is bishop Dr. Markus Dröge (2010). The EKBO is one of 20 Lutheran, Reformed, and United churches of the EKD and is itself a United church. The church has 745,679 members (December 2025) in 520 parishes. The church is a member of the Union of Evangelical Churches in the EKD (German: Union Evangelischer Kirchen - UEK) and the Communion of Protestant Churches in Europe. In Berlin and Görlitz the church runs two academies. St. Mary's Church, Berlin, is the church of the bishop of the EKBO with the Berlin Cathedral being under joint supervision of all the member churches of the UEK.

== Background ==
The theology of the church goes back to Martin Luther and the Protestant Reformation. Since 1927 the ordination of women has been allowed, and the blessing of same-sex unions has been allowed by the synod but depends on the local presbytery (German: Gemeindekirchenrat).

== History ==
After the Second World War the integrated Evangelical Church of the old-Prussian Union (under this name 1922–1953, then renamed into Evangelical Church of the Union) was transformed into an umbrella organization. In 1947 its ecclesiastical provinces (German: Kirchenprovinzen), as far as their territories were not annexed by Poland or the Soviet Union, became independent church bodies of their own.

=== Evangelical Church in Berlin-Brandenburg ===
The March of Brandenburg ecclesiastical province (including Berlin, but after 1945 without the territory east the Oder-Neiße line), which until 1933 was headed in rotation by the general superintendents of Kurmark, Neumark-Lower Lusatia, and Berlin, became the Protestant Church in Berlin-Brandenburg. After 1945, the church covered only the territory still in Germany.

From 1972 on this church body ran double administrative structures in West Berlin and East Berlin - also competent for Brandenburg - because the communist government of East Germany did not allow pastors and church functionaries to travel freely between East and West. The two church bodies reunited in 1991.

=== Evangelical Church of Silesia(n Upper Lusatia) ===
In 1946 the Silesian ecclesiastical province, presided over by Ernst Hornig, held its first post-war provincial synod in then already Polish Świdnica (formerly Schweidnitz). But on 4 December 1946 Poland deported Hornig from Wrocław (formerly Breslau) beyond the Lusatian Neiße, where he took his new seat in the German part of the now divided city of Görlitz of the former Prussian province of Lower Silesia. In 1947 the Polish government also expelled the remaining members of the Silesian consistory, which temporarily could continue to officiate in Wrocław. Görlitz became the seat of the tiny territorial rest of the Silesian ecclesiastical province, constituting on May 1, 1947 as the independent Evangelical Church of Silesia (German: Evangelische Kirche von Schlesien) - comprising the small parts of Silesia remaining with Germany after 1945.

All of the church property east of the Oder-Neiße Line, parochial and provincial alike, was expropriated without compensation, and the church buildings were mostly taken over by the Roman Catholic Church in Poland. A small number of Silesian churches are owned today by Protestant congregations of the Evangelical-Augsburg Church in Poland (see e.g. Churches of Peace).

On April 9, 1968 East Germany adopted its second constitution, accounting for the de facto transformation into a communist dictatorship. Thus the East German government deprived the church bodies of their status as statutory bodies (German: Körperschaft des öffentlichen Rechts) and abolished the church tax, by which parishioners' contributions had been automatically collected as a surcharge on the income tax. Now parishioners would have to fix the level of their contributions and to transfer them again and again on their own. This together with ongoing discrimination of church members, which resulted in many people leaving the church, effectively eroded the financial situation of the church bodies in the East.

In 1968, churches were reclassified as civic associations, and the East German government required the Evangelical Church of Silesia to remove the word "Silesia" from its name. The church body then chose the new name Evangelical Church of the Görlitz Ecclesiastical Region.

With the end of the East German dictatorship in 1989, things changed decisively. In 1992 the Evangelical Church of the Görlitz Ecclesiastical Region dropped its unwanted name and chose the new name of Evangelical Church of Silesian Upper Lusatia.

Due to increasing irreligion, the low birth rates in Germany since the 1970s, and low numbers of Protestant immigrants, the Evangelical Church bodies in Germany are undergoing a severe shrinking of parishioners and thus of parishioners' contributions. So church bodies are forced to reorganise their efforts also with respect to the financial situation.

In 2004 the Evangelical Church of the Silesian Upper Lusatia merged with the Evangelical Church in Berlin-Brandenburg to become the present church body. Ordination of women became allowed. In June 2017, the church voted to allow same-sex marriages in its churches.

== Leading persons and bishops in history ==
Today the leading bishop is elected for ten years from the synod and can be reelected for a second term. Since 1817, when the Lutheran, Calvinist and newly founded united congregations formed a common administrative umbrella, later called Evangelical Church in Prussia's older Provinces, the area comprised by today's church body formed part of the two old-Prussian ecclesiastical provinces of Silesia (German: Kirchenprovinz Schlesien) and of the March of Brandenburg (German: Kirchenprovinz Mark Brandenburg). Until 1933/1934 the spiritual leaders of the Evangelical Church were called general superintendents (German: Generalsuperintendent[en]) with regional competences. The adulteration of the church constitution by the Nazi-submissive German Christians was accompanied by new titles (provincial bishop, German: Provinzialbischof) with hierarchical supremacy over parishioners and church employees, and renamings (provosts German: Propst instead of general superintendents). After 1945 the offices of general superintendents as spiritual leaders were reconstituted. The two ecclesiastical provinces assumed independence as the Evangelical Church of Silesia (as of 1947) and the Evangelical Church in Berlin-Brandenburg (as of 1948) when their respective provincial synods legislated new church constitutions. Both independent regional Protestant church bodies created its office of an elected chairperson called bishop, in Protestant tradition of course without hierarchical supremacy. After the merger of both churches in 2004, Wolfgang Huber was elected as the first bishop of the merged Evangelical Church in Berlin - Brandenburg - Silesian Upper Lusatia (German: Evangelische Kirche Berlin-Brandenburg-schlesische Oberlausitz; EKBO.

=== Chairmen of the March of Brandenburg ecclesiastical province ===
The general superintendents for the different areas were rotating in the spiritual leadership within the provincial consistory, seated in Berlin.

==== Ecclesiastical Chairmen of Berlin (City) ====
- 1823 - 1865: D. Daniel Amadeus Gottlieb Neander, bearing the title Provost of St. Peter's Church, then the highest ecclesiastical rank in Berlin, in 1830 King Frederick William III of Prussia bestowed him with the merely honorary title Bishop.
- 1865 - 1871: not restaffed before Neander's death in 1869, then vacancy
- 1871 - 1892: D. Bruno Brückner, bearing the title General Superintendent (Gen.Supt.)
- 1893 - 1911: Gen.Supt. D. Wilhelm Faber
- 1912 - 1918: Gen.Supt. D. Friedrich Lahusen
- 1918 - 1921: vacancy
- 1921 - 1927: Gen.Supt. D. Georg Burghart
- 1928 - 1933: Gen.Supt. D. Emil Karow, furloughed by State Commissioner August Jäger, after Hermann Göring's Prussian government usurped the factual power in the church body.

==== General superintendent of Berlin Suburbia ====
The general superintendency was called in German: Berlin-Land und Kölln-Land.

- 1911 - 1933: D. Wilhelm Haendler (created in 1911, dissolved after Haendler retired)

==== General superintendents of the Kurmark ====
- 1540 - 1550: Jacob Stratner (*unknown-1550*)
- 1550 - 1566: Johannes Agricola (1494-1566)
- 1566 - 1581: Andreas Musculus (1514-1581)
- 1581 - 1594: Christoph Cornerus (also Corner, Körner, or Korner; 1519-1594)
- 1595 - 1633: Christoph Pelargus (also Storch; 1565-1633)
- 1633 – 1829: vacancy, the function of general superintendent was taken by the recently formed Marcher Consistory (Märkisches Konsistorium), consisting of Lutheran and Reformed (Calvinist) members
- 1829 - 1853: D. Daniel Amadeus Gottlieb Neander, in personal union Provost of St. Peter's Church (Berlin)
- 1853 - 1873: D. Wilhelm Hoffmann, also court preacher
- 1873 - 1879: ?
- 1879 - 1891: Theodor Johannes Rudolf Kögel (1829-1896), also Berlin royal court preacher since 1863
- 1892 - 1903: D. Ernst Hermann (von) Dryander (1843-1922)
- 1903 - 1921?: David Hennig Paul Köhler (1848-1926)
- 1921 - 1924: Karl Theodor Georg Axenfeld (1869-1924)
- 1925 - 1933: D. Dr. Otto Dibelius, furloughed by State Commissioner August Jäger.

==== General superintendent for the Governorate of Frankfurt upon Oder ====
- 1829–1836: Wilhelm Ross

The general superintendency of Frankfurt was merged with Lower Lusatia into New March-Lower Lusatia in 1836.

==== General superintendents of Lower Lusatia ====
The general superintendency was seated in Lübben. The general superintendency of Frankfurt was merged with Lower Lusatia into New Narch-Lower-Lusatia in 1836.

- 1711–1715: Johann Christian Adami
- 1715–1811: ?
- 1811–1836: Friedrich Brescius (1766–1842), still appointed by the Saxon government

==== General superintendents of the New March-Lower Lusatia ====
The general superintendency was seated in Cottbus.

- 1836–1842: Friedrich Brescius (1766–1842)
- 1842–1853: ?
- 1853–1884: Carl Büchsel
- 1884–1900: ?
- 1900–1909?: D. Theodor Braun (?-1911)
- 1909?–1925?: Hans Keßler (1856-1939)
- 1925–1933: D. Ernst Vits, pensioned off by State Commissioner August Jäger.

==== Bishopric of the March of Brandenburg ====
In 1933 the Prussian government imposed new leaders, who reshaped the structures. The evangelical church (then named Evangelical Church of the old-Prussian Union) underwent a schism into a schismatic streamlined Nazi-obedient branch and a steadfast, truly Protestant branch, clinging to the Confessing Church. The bishops were subordinate to the newly instituted State Bishop (German: Landesbischof) of the Evangelical Church of the old-Prussian Union, Ludwig Müller. During Church Affair Minister Hanns Kerrl's attempt to force the Confessing Church and the officially recognised hierarchy to reunite, 1935–1937, many outspoken Nazi protagonists were furloughed. After the attempts to compromise the Confessing Church opposition turned out less successful than expected many functions remained simply vacant and the Church Affair Ministry and its favourites usurped direct influence by orders and ordinances.

===== Provincial Bishop for Brandenburg =====
- 1933, September - November: Joachim Hossenfelder
- 1933, November - 1945: vacancy due to the struggle of the churches

===== Provincial Bishop for Berlin =====
- 1933 - 1934: D. Emil Karow (resigned in opposition to the Nazi-obedient State Bishop Ludwig Müller)
- 1934 - 1945: vacancy due to the struggle of the churches

===== Kurmark (1933–1945) =====
While the Nazi-streamlined provost was subordinate to the Bishopric of Berlin, the general superintendent ignored his illegitimate furlough and continued to serve, however, accepted only by the non-schismatic Confessing Church congregations.

- 1933 - 1936: Provost Fritz Loerzer
- 1936 - 1939: Provost Georg Heimerdinger (1875-1967)
- 1939 - 1945: Provost Fritz Loerzer
- 1934 - 1945: Gen. Supt. D. Dr. Otto Dibelius,

===== New March-Lower Lusatia (1933–1945) =====
The Nazi-streamlined provost was subordinate to the Bishopric of Berlin.

- 1933 - 1935?: Provost Otto Eckert
- 1935 - 1945: vacancy due to the struggle of the churches

=== General superintendents since 1945 ===
In 1945 the pre-1933 structures were provisionally restituted. The provisionally leading advisory council (German: Beirat) reconfirmed Dibelius as general superintendent of the Kurmark (i.e. Electoral March). The Beirat also commissioned Dibelius to serve per pro the vacant general superintendencies of Berlin and the New March-Lower Lusatia. The Soviet occupational power agreed that Dibelius would use the title of Bishop, better recognisable for the Soviets as clerical title than the term general superintendent mostly unknown in Russian. In 1949 the Kurmark ceded deaneries to the New March-Upper Lusatia general superintendency which had lost almost all the New March, Polish annexed in March 1945, by the flight and expulsion of its parishioners living there. The New March-Upper Lusatia general superintendency was renamed into Cottbus after its seat. In 1963 the new Eberswalde general superintendency was partitioned from the Kurmark, which was renamed on that occasion to Neuruppin (and again into Potsdam in 2010). The Eberswalde general superintendency remerged in that of Neuruppin in 1996. In 2003, with the merger of the Evangelical Church in Silesian Upper Lusatia, its region became a subdivision of the EKBO.

==== Berlin ====
- 1945 - 1946: D. Dr. Otto Dibelius, per pro

===== Berlin I =====
The general superintendency was seated in Berlin (West).

- 1946–1955: Gerhard Jacobi
- 1955–1961: Immanuel Pack
- 1961–1975: Hans-Martin Helbich

The general superintendency of Berlin I was then merged in the function of the Bishop in Berlin-Brandenburg (western region)

===== Berlin II =====
The general superintendency was seated in Berlin (East).

- 1946–1955: Friedrich-Wilhelm Krummacher
- 1956–1963: Fritz Führ (1904-1963)
- 1964–1974: Gerhard Schmitt
- 1974–1982: Hartmut Grünbaum
- 1982–1993: Günter Krusche, resigned after revealing his Stasi collaboration

===== Berlin (reunited) =====
- 1993–1996: Ingrid Laudien (1934-2009)
- 1996–2008: Martin-Michael Passauer
- 2008–2011: Ralf Meister
- 2011– date: Ulrike Trautwein

==== Kurmark (1945–1963)/Neuruppin (1963–2010)/Potsdam (since) ====
The general superintendency is seated in Potsdam. In 1963 the general superintendency of Eberswalde was partitioned from the Kurmark, renamed into Neuruppin on that occasion. In 1996 Eberswalde remerged in Neuruppin.

- 1945–1946: D. Dr. Otto Dibelius
- 1946–1963: Walter Braun (1892–1973)
- 1963–1978: Horst Lahr (1913-2008)
- 1979–1996: Günter Bransch (1931)
- 1997–2010: Hans-Ulrich Schulz
- 2010– date: Heilgard Asmus

==== New March-Lower Lusatia (1945–1949)/Cottbus (1949–2010) ====
- 1945–1946: D. Dr. Otto Dibelius, per pro
- 1946–1972: Günter Jacob
- 1973–1981: Gottfried Forck
- 1982–1993: Reinhardt Richter (1928–2004)
- 1995–2004: Rolf Wischnath
- 2004–2010: Heilgard Asmus

In 2010 the general superintendency was dissolved and its area partitioned between Potsdam and Görlitz.

==== Eberswalde (1963–1996) ====
In 1963 the Eberswalde district (Sprengel Eberswalde) was partitioned from the Kurmark.

- 1963–1972: Albrecht Schönherr
- 1972–1978: Hermann-Theodor Hanse (1912–1999)
- 1978–1983: Erich Schuppan
- 1983–1996: Leopold Esselbach (1931)

==== Görlitz (since 2004) ====
In 2003 the Evangelical Church of Silesian Upper Lusatia merged with the Evangelical Church in Berlin-Brandenburg, its region forms a unit within the merger called EKBO.

- 2004–2011: Regional Bishop Hans-Wilhelm Pietz
- 2011– date: Gen.Supt. Martin Herche

=== Bishops of the Evangelical Church in Berlin-Brandenburg ===
In 1948 the first post-war elected provincial synod of the March of Brandenburg ecclesiastical province of the Evangelical Church of the old-Prussian Union constituted as an independent church body named Evangelical Church in Berlin-Brandenburg. The new constitution provided for a chairperson to bear the title bishop.

- 1948 - 1966: D. Dr. Otto Dibelius
- 1966 - 1972: D. Kurt Scharf

West 1972 - 1991 (competent for West Berlin):

- 1972 - 1976: D. Kurt Scharf
- 1976 - 1991: Dr. theol. Martin Kruse (b. 1929)

East 1972 - 1991 (competent for East Berlin and Brandenburg):

- 1972 - 1981: D. h.c. Albrecht Schönherr (1911–2009)
- 1981 - 1991: Dr. theol. Gottfried Forck (1923–1996)

Reunited church body since 1991:

- 1991 - 1993: Dr. theol. Martin Kruse
- 1994 - 2003: Prof. Dr. theol. Wolfgang Huber

On January 1, 2004 the church body merged with the Evangelical Church of Silesian Upper Lusatia.

=== Silesian general superintendents and bishops ===
==== General superintendents (1829–1924) ====
- 1829 - 1830: Johann Gottfried Bobertag
- 1830 - 1832: ?
- 1832 - 1843: Ernst Friedrich Gabriel Ribbeck
- 1844 - 1863: August Hahn
- 1864 - 1900: David Erdmann
- 1901 - 1903: Hugo Nehmiz (1845–1903)

==== General superintendent, Liegnitz Region (1904–1935) ====
- 1905 - 1924: Wilhelm Haupt
- 1924 - 1933: Martin Schian, deposed by State commissioner Jäger
- 1933 - 1935: vacancy, Otto Zänker per pro

==== General superintendent, Breslau and Oppeln Regions (1904–1935) ====
- 1904 - 1925: Theodor Nottebohm (1850–1931)
- 1925 - 1935: Otto Zänker, since 1933 also per pro in the Liegnitz Region

==== Bishops (1935–2003) ====
- 1935 - 1941/1945: D. Otto Zänker, due to his siding with the Confessing Church he was involuntarily pensioned off in 1941, but ignored that, however, accepted only by the non-schismatic Confessing Church congregations. The Nazi authorities expelled him from Silesia in January 1945.
- 1941/1945 - 1946: vacancy
  - 1945 - 1946: D. Praeses Ernst Hornig per pro
- 1946 - 1963: D. Ernst Hornig
- 1964 - 1979: D. Hans-Joachim Fränkel
- 1979 - 1985: Hanns-Joachim Wollstadt
- 1986 - 1994: Joachim Rogge
- 1994 - 2003: Klaus Wollenweber

=== Bishops of the Evangelical Church Berlin - Brandenburg - Silesian Upper Lusatia ===
- 2004 - 2009: Wolfgang Huber
- 2009–2019 Markus Dröge
- 2019–present: Christian Stäblein

== Synod ==
The election of the synod (Landessynode) is for six years. The synod meets each year in Berlin. The leader of the synod is called Präses (English: praeses).

== Books ==
- Berlin-Brandenburg:
  - Gesangbuch zum gottesdienstlichen Gebrauch für evangelische Gemeinen, Berlin, 1829
  - Evangelisches Gesangbuch, nach Zustimmung der Provinzialsynode vom Jahre 1884 zur Einführung in der Provinz Brandenburg mit Genehmigung des Evang. Oberkirchenrats herausgegeben vom Königlichen Konsistorium, Berlin, 1884
  - Evangelisches Gesangbuch for Brandenburg and Pommern, Berlin and Frankfurt/Oder; eingeführt durch Beschlüsse der Provinzialsynoden der Kirchenprovinz Pommern 1925 and 1927 and Mark Brandenburg 1927 and 1929 and nach der Notverordnung des Kirchensenats from August 7, 1931 published from the Provinzialkirchenräten Brandenburg and Pommern 1931
  - Evangelisches Kirchengesangbuch, Edition for the Evangelische Kirche in Berlin-Brandenburg; Ausgabe für die Konsistorialbezirke Berlin, Magdeburg, Greifswald und Görlitz und der Evang. Landeskirche Anhalts" bzw. "Evangelisches Kirchengesangbuch, Ausgabe für die Evangelische Landeskirche Anhalt, Evang. Kirche Berlin-Brandenburg, Evang. Kirche des Görlitzer Kirchengebietes, Evang. Landeskirche Greifswald, Evang. Kirche der Kirchenprovinz Sachsen"
  - Evangelisches Gesangbuch, Edition for the Evangelische Landeskirche Anhalts, die Evangelische Kirche in Berlin-Brandenburg, die Evangelische Kirche der schlesischen Oberlausitz, die Pommersche Evangelische Kirche, die Evangelische Kirche der Kirchenprovinz Sachsen, Berlin/Leipzig; eingeführt am Reformationstag, 31. Oktober 1993
- Silesian Upper Lusatia:
  - Gesangbuch für Evangelische Gemeinden Schlesiens; since 1878
  - Schlesisches Provinzial-Gesangbuch; since 1908
  - Evangelisches Kirchen-Gesangbuch (EKG) - Edition for the Konsistorialbezirke Berlin, Magdeburg, Greifswald und Görlitz and the Evang. Landeskirche Anhalts/ Edition for the Evangelische Landeskirche Anhalt, Evangelische Kirche Berlin-Brandenburg, Evangelische Kirche des Görlitzer Kirchengebietes, Evangelische Landeskirche Greifswald, Evangelische Kirche der Kirchenprovinz Sachsen; since 1953
  - Evangelisches Gesangbuch - Edition for the Evangelische Landeskirche Anhalts, the Evangelische Kirche in Berlin-Brandenburg, the Evangelische Kirche der schlesischen Oberlausitz, the Pommersche Evangelische Kirche, the Evangelische Kirche der Kirchenprovinz Sachsen; since Mai 1994
