= Horníček =

Horníček (feminine: Horníčková) is a Czech surname. It is a diminutive of the word horník (meaning 'miner') and the surname Horník. Notable people with the surname include:

- Lukáš Horníček (born 2002), Czech footballer
- Miroslav Horníček (1918–2003), Czech actor and writer
