= Christoph Albrecht =

German organist, composer (1930–2016)

Christoph Albrecht (4 January 1930 – 24 September 2016) was a German organist, conductor, composer, musicologist, and music educator. He was born in Salzwedel. He toured extensively as an organist, appearing in concerts and recitals throughout Europe and in the United States. He is the author of several publications on the topics of liturgy and hymnology. He also wrote extensively on sacred music from the 16th through the 18th centuries, and was instrumental in publishing many forgotten works from that period.

Albrecht studied the organ with Günther Ramin. From 1943 to 1948 he served as organist at the Church of St. Mary in Salzwedel. In 1953, he was appointed cantor at the Naumburg Cathedral and lecturer at Kirchenmusikschule Halle. In 1960, he became director of the Kirchenmusikschule Dresden. From 1976 to 1992 he was organist and choirmaster at St. Mary's Church, Berlin. He died in Berlin in 2016.
