= Günther Ramin =

German organist, conductor, composer and pedagogue (1898–1956)

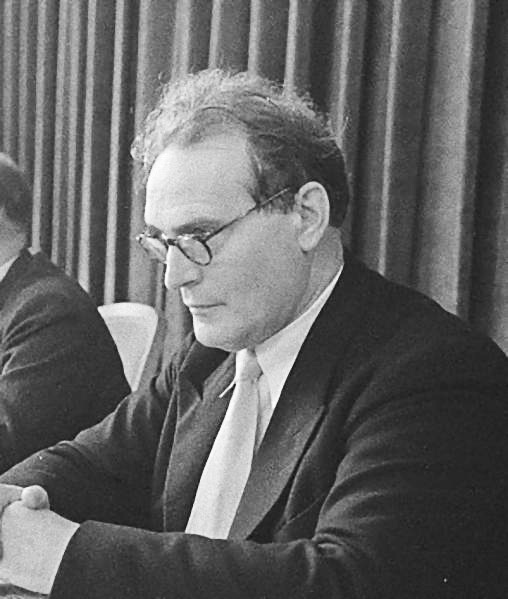
- Ramin in 1950
- Born: Günther Werner Hans Ramin; 15 October 1898; Karlsruhe, German Empire
- Died: 27 February 1956 (aged 57); Leipzig, East Germany
- Occupations: Organist; Conductor; Composer

Günther Werner Hans Ramin (15 October 1898 – 27 February 1956) was an influential German organist, conductor, composer and pedagogue, holding the post of Thomaskantor in Leipzig from 1940 to 1955.

== Early life ==
Ramin, the son of a pastor, was born in Karlsruhe, Germany. At the age of 12 he was accepted into the famed Thomanerchor of the Thomaskirche in Leipzig by the then-cantor, Gustav Schreck. At the time, Karl Straube, the organist, conductor, publisher and advocate of the music of Max Reger, was Schreck's assistant, and he took note of Ramin's abilities as an organist and composer. Later, when Straube took over the cantorate at the Thomaskirche, Ramin became his assistant, filling in for him as choirmaster and director.

During World War I, Ramin was drafted into military service; however, he managed to complete his examinations at the Leipzig Conservatory with distinction in January 1917 and on 30 May 1918, Straube was able to write to him on the front that he had been chosen as organist of the Thomaskirche. Ramin returned from the war and took up this position, which he held for twenty-two years until World War II broke out.

== Career ==
Ramin built a successful performing career as a concert organist; however, in the 1930s he increasingly devoted himself to conducting. He took over the directorship of the Lehrergesangsverein in Leipzig in 1923 and worked regularly with the choir of the Gewandhaus. In 1935 he became the conductor of the Berlin Philharmonic Choir. He was the organist at the 1936 Nuremberg rally, playing on a specially constructed organ, the largest in Germany at the time. On New Year's Day 1940, Ramin was appointed the Thomaskantor in succession of J. S. Bach and last Karl Straube, a post he held until his death.

After 1945, Ramin succeeded in quickly restoring the Thomanerchor's high international reputation through numerous concert tours including two concert tours to the Soviet Union (1954) and South America (1955). As Cantor of St. Thomas, he saw himself as primarily committed to the work of his distant predecessor, Johann Sebastian Bach. Ramin was President of the Bach Committee of the German Democratic Republic (GDR), Executive Director of the Neue Bachgesellschaft or New Bach Society, Artistic Director of the 1950 Bach Competition, and Director of the Bachfest Leipzig (Leipzig Bach Festival) in 1950, 1953, and 1955. He was also a board member of the International Bach Society. In 1950, Ramin was awarded an honorary doctorate from the University of Leipzig and the National Prize of the GDR for his services at the Leipzig Bach Festival.

The year after this last tour, Ramin suffered a sudden brain hemorrhage and died on 27 February 1956.

== Legacy ==
Some of Ramin's recordings have been re-released on compact disc. Notable among them is his much admired (although severely abridged) 1941 version of Bach's St Matthew Passion, including as soloists Karl Erb, Tiana Lemnitz, and Gerhard Hüsch. He was also active as an organ teacher. Among his notable students were Christoph Albrecht, Karl Richter, Diethard Hellmann, Hanns-Martin Schneidt and Helmut Walcha.
