= Kurmark =

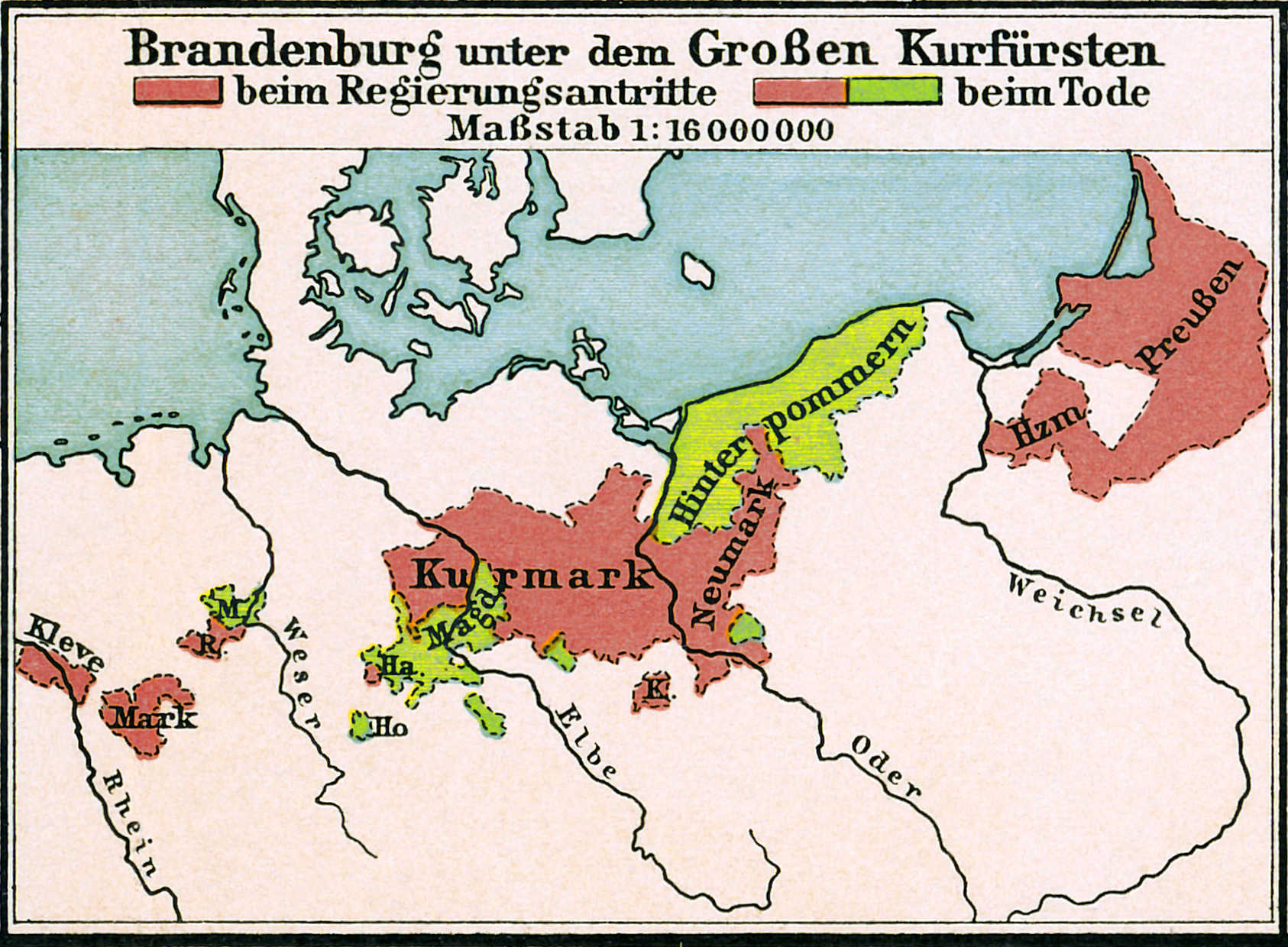
Kurmark within Brandenburg-Prussia, at the death of Elector Frederick William in 1688

The German term Kurmark (archaic Churmark, "Electoral March") referred to the Imperial State held by the margraves of Brandenburg, who had been awarded the electoral (Kur) dignity by the Golden Bull of 1356. In early modern times, Kurmark proper denoted the western part of the margraviate to the exclusion of later acquisitions.

== Territory ==
The Kurmark included the Altmark in the west and the Mittelmark, core territory of the 10th century Northern March, as well as the Uckermark region in the northeast and Prignitz in the northwest. The boundary also comprised the minor lordships of Ruppin and Lubusz Land west of the Oder River; since 1575 also Beeskow and Storkow.

It did not include the adjacent possessions of the Hohenzollern dynasty, such as the Neumark (New March) beyond the Oder, purchased by the margraves in the mid 13th century, and Cottbus in the southeast.

== History ==
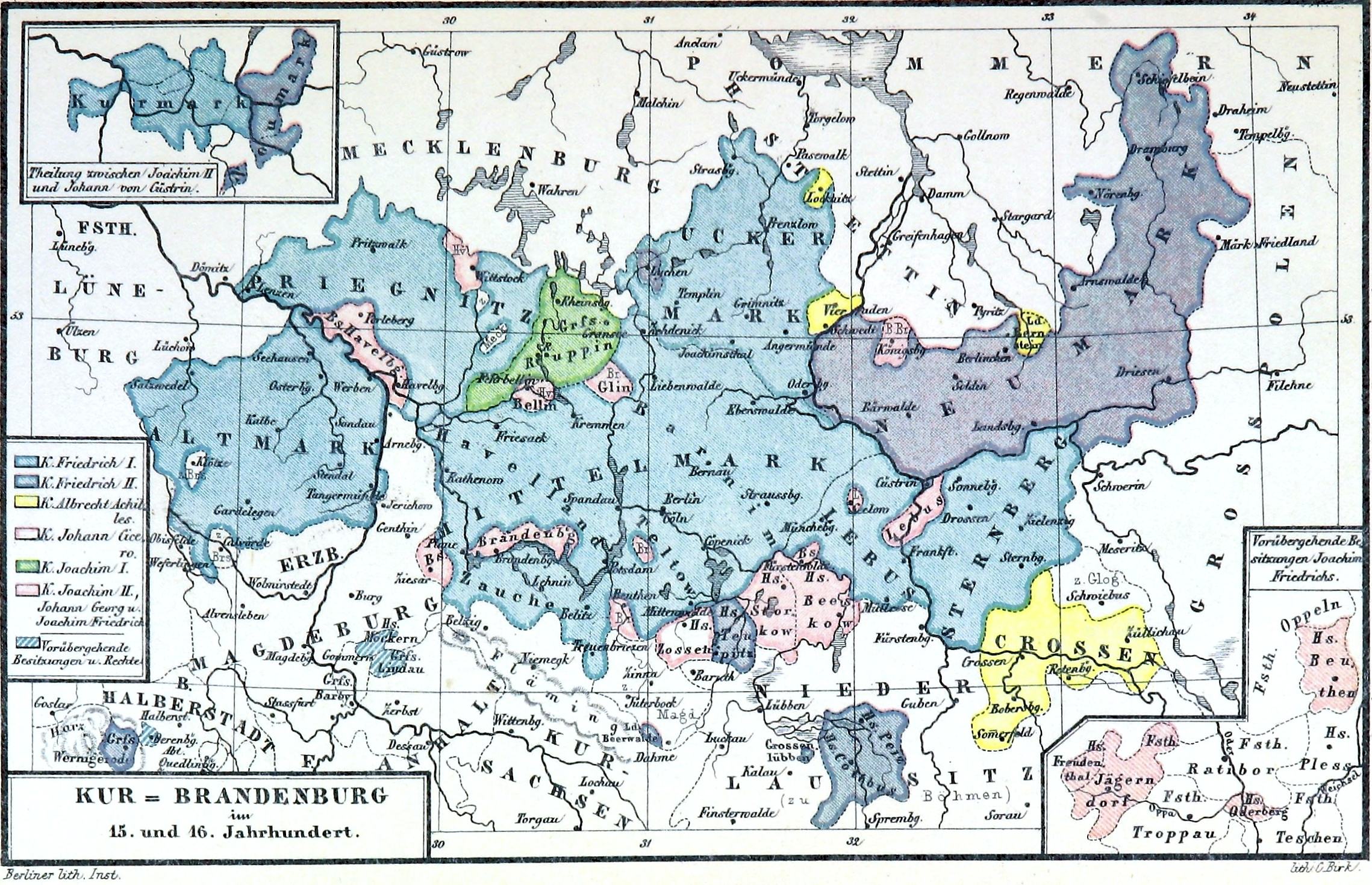
Map of Electoral Brandenburg in the 15th–16th centuries; the Kurmark is in an inset at upper left.

The Kurmark corresponded to the Margraviate of Brandenburg held by the House of Hohenzollern until 1535, when upon the death of Elector Joachim I Nestor, the lands were divided among his elder son Joachim II Hector, who also inherited the electoral dignity, and the younger John of Küstrin. John received the Neumark territory and Cottbus, which were split off the electoral lands.

Already in 1571, the Hohenzollern lands were re-united under Elector John George of Brandenburg, when his uncle John of Küstrin died without heirs. Nevertheless, the denotation Kurmark remained affiliated with the territory west of the Oder.

== General Superintendency ==
With the Protestant Reformation in the Electorate of Brandenburg, starting officially in 1539, the following year the first general superintendent of Kurmark was appointed. In 1815 the usage of the title was interrupted. Within the March of Brandenburg ecclesiastical province of the Evangelical Church in Prussia, established in 1817, the Kurmark formed again a general superintendency from 1829 to 1948. Two other general superintendencies within the March of Brandenburg ecclesiastical province were that of the New March and Lower Lusatia and that of Berlin.

Most known is Kurmark's General Superintendent F. K. Otto Dibelius, officially serving in this position from 1925 until his furlough by the Prussian State Commissioner for the Prussian ecclesiastical affairs (German: Staatskommissar für die preußischen kirchlichen Angelegenheiten), August Jäger, in 1933. After the schism of the evangelical church (then Evangelical Church of the old-Prussian Union, under this name 1922-1953) into a schismatic streamlined Nazi-obedient branch and a steadfast truly Protestant branch, clinging to the Confessing Church, Dibelius ignored the furlough and continued to serve as general superintendent until 1945 - with effect only in the non-schismatic congregations.

In 1945 the schism was overcome by repressing many prominent Nazi-obedient leaders from their positions in the official church body. The provisional advisory council (German: Beirat), leading the church body for the time being until the new election of a provincial synod (October 1946), reconfirmed Dibelius as General Superintendent of Kurmark and commissioned him to also serve the vacant general superintendencies of Berlin and New March and Lusatia. In 1948 the new constitution of the March of Brandenburg ecclesiastical province, now named Evangelical Church in Berlin-Brandenburg renamed the general superintendency of Kurmark into Sprengel Neuruppin (1949) with a smaller territory. Also after the merger of the Silesian and Berlin-Brandenburg evangelical church bodies into today's Evangelical Church of Berlin-Brandenburg-Silesian Upper Lusatia in 2004 the Sprengel Neuruppin continued to exist. Despite the name, the general superintendent is seated in Potsdam.

=== List of General Superintendents ===
- 1540–1550: Jacob Stratner (*unknown-1550*)
- 1550–1566: Johannes Agricola (*1494-1566*)
- 1566–1581: Andreas Musculus (*1514-1581*)
- 1581–1594: Christoph Cornerus (also Corner, Körner, or Korner; *1519-1594*)
- 1595–1633: Christoph Pelargus (also Storch; *1565-1633*)
- 1633–1829: vacancy, the function was assumed by the recently formed Marcher Consistory (Märkisches Konsistorium), comprising Lutheran and Reformed (Calvinist) members
- 1829–1853: D. Gottlieb Neander (*1775-1669*), confidant of King Frederick William III, who bestowed him the merely honorary title of bishop in 1830, in personal union Provost of Berlin (1823-1865).
- 1853–1873: D. Wilhelm Hoffmann
- ?
- 1879-1891: Theodor Johannes Rudolf Kögel (*1829-1896*), also Berlin royal court preacher since 1863
- 1892–1903: D. Ernst Hermann (von) Dryander (*1843-1922*)
- 1903–1921?: David Hennig Paul Köhler (*1848-1926*)
- 1921–1924: Karl Theodor Georg Axenfeld (*1869-1924*)
- 1925–1933: D. Otto Dibelius, ignoring the furlough and continuing to serve as general superintendent until 1945.

In 1933 the streamlined official church body replaced the title by that of a provost, subordinate to the general superintendency of Berlin, then newly titled Bishopric of Berlin, led by a provincial bishop:

  - 1933–1936: Provost Fritz Loerzer (*1893-1952*)
  - 1936–1939: Provost Georg Heimerdinger (*1875-1967*)
  - 1939–1945: Provost Fritz Loerzer (*1893-1952*)
  - mid-1934–1945: D. Dr. Otto Dibelius, ignoring the furlough and continuing to serve as general superintendent - accepted only in the non-schismatic congregations.

In 1945 the old title was re-established:

- 1945–1946: D. Dr. Otto Dibelius, reconfirmed by the provisionally leading advisory council (German: Beirat). The Beirat also commissioned Dibelius to serve per pro the vivant general superintendencies of Berlin and New March-Lower Lusatia. The Soviet occupational power agreed that Dibelius would use the title of Bishop, better recognisable for the Soviets as clerical title than the term general superintendent mostly unknown in Russian.
- 1947–1963: Walter Braun (1892–1973)

In 1963 the general superintendency of Kurmark was renamed into Sprengel Neuruppin with a smaller ambit.

== Other Objects named Kurmark ==
Things named after the Kurmark include the freighter Kurmark and the Panzer Division Kurmark.
