= Kurt Scharf =

German theologian and bishop (1902–1990)

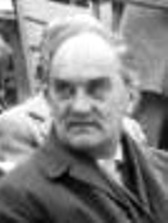
Kurt Scharf at the Evangelischer Kirchentag, Berlin 1961

Kurt Scharf (October 21, 1902 – March 28, 1990) was a German clergyman and bishop of the Evangelical Church in Berlin-Brandenburg.

== Career ==
Kurt Scharf was born in Landsberg an der Warthe in the Prussian Province of Brandenburg (now Gorzów Wielkopolski in Poland). After completing his Abitur he studied Protestant theology in Berlin and was a member of the Studentenverbindung Verein Deutscher Studenten Berlin (a member of the Verband der Vereine Deutscher Studenten). In the 1930s he worked as a pastor for the Evangelical Church of the old-Prussian Union in Sachsenhausen, a locality of Oranienburg and as such had occasional opportunities to tend to the inmates of the homonymous concentration camp there.

As praeses of the Brandenburg provincial Synod of Confession (Bekenntnissynode) of the Nazi-opponent Confessing Church (as of 1935) he became the chairman of the conference of Landesbruderräte (councils of the Confessing Church paralleling the governing bodies in those regional church bodies dominated by the Nazi-submissive German Christians). In 1945 he was appointed provost and leader of the consistory of the old-Prussian March of Brandenburg ecclesiastical province. In 1952 he was given an honorary doctorate by the Faculty of Theology at Humboldt University.

From 1966 to 1976 he was the elected bishop of the Evangelical Church in Berlin-Brandenburg (new name of the March of Brandenburg ecclesiastical province after it assumed independence in 1948), although since 1961 the bishop's area of responsibility and influence had been restricted to West Berlin. As a result of this he functioned as the bishop of the Western regional synod from 1972. Between 1957 and 1960, Scharf was chairman of the council of the Evangelical Church of the Union (EKU) (at that time one of the principal umbrellas of German Protestant churches), between 1961 and 1967 chairman of the council of Evangelical Churches in Germany (EKD) (the umbrella organisation of Lutheran, united and Reformed churches in Germany). On March 28, 1990 he died en route to Schlachtensee hospital in Berlin.

== Cold War ==
He was a Christian pacifist and opposed the production and placement of nuclear weapons on German soil.

== The Ostdenkschrift ==
Scharf contributed to the Ostdenkschrift of the EKD, the first recognition (in 1965) by a significant German organisation of the Oder–Neisse line. He was awarded the Copernicus Medal of the People's Republic of Poland in 1973 for his support for German reconciliation with Poland, as well as an honorary doctorate from the Christian Academy of the University of Warsaw. Scharf, who for a time was also a member of the central committee of the World Council of Churches, was a strong supporter of the ecumenical ideal. As vice-president of the United World Bible Societies he was a strong advocate of spreading the Bible throughout the world.

== Spiritual welfare ==
Scharf also took on many difficult cases of providing spiritual welfare to prisoners, for example to Germans imprisoned for war crimes and to imprisoned members of the Baader-Meinhof Group.

== Bibliography ==
- Vom Herrengeheimnis der Wahrheit (On the Lord's Secret of the Truth) - Festschrift for Heinrich Vogel, 1962
- Für ein politisches Gewissen der Kirche (For a Political Conscience of the Church) (ed. W. Erk), 1972
- Streit mit der Macht, (Argument with Power), 1983
- Widerstehen und Versöhnen. Rückblicke und Ausblicke (Resistance and Reconciliation. Reviews and Prospects) (ed. Jo Krummacher), 1987; 2nd edition 1988
