= Miloš Horník =

Slovak volleyball player (born 1990)

Personal information
- Nationality: Slovak
- Born: 17 March 1990 (age 36)
- Height: 205 cm (6 ft 9 in)
- Weight: 88 kg (194 lb)
- Spike: 358 cm (141 in)
- Block: 340 cm (134 in)

Volleyball information
- Current club: Spartak VKP Komarno (SVK)
- Number: 24 (National Team)

Career
Years	Teams
2015-2016	Spartak Vkp Komarno

National team
2015-2016	Slovakia
- Last updated: 25 February 2017

Miloš Horník (born 17 March 1990) is a Slovak male volleyball player. He is part of the Slovakia men's national volleyball team. On club level he plays for Spartak Vkp Komarno.
