= Hornick =

Hornick may refer to:

- Hornick, Cornwall, United Kingdom
- Hornick, Iowa, United States
