= Irina Hornig =

East German skydiver

Medal record

Representing East Germany

Women's Parachuting

World Championships
Bronze medal – third place	1972 Tahlequah	Team Accuracy
Gold medal – first place	1974 Szolnok	Team Accuracy
Gold medal – first place	1976 Guidonia-Rom	Style

Irina Klabuhn née Hornig is a skydiver, who competed for the SC Dynamo Hoppegarten / Sportvereinigung (SV) Dynamo. She won many medals at the world championships.
