= Ernst Hornig =

- Born: August 29, 1894; Kohlfurt, Province of Silesia, Germany
- Died: 5 December 1976 (aged 82); Frankfurt am Main, Hessen, West Germany
- Occupation(s): Bishop; Theologian

Ernst Hornig (25 August 1894 – 5 December 1976) was Germany "Praeses" and Bishop of the Evangelical Church of Silesia. He was appointed to the Bishopric in 1946, and because of frontier changes mandated the previous year he undertook his episcopal duties in respect of Silesia from Görlitz.

== Life ==
=== Early life and education ===
Ernst Hornig was born in Kohlfurt, a small town in Lower Silesia known as a major rail junction on one of the main lines linking Berlin with Breslau. Another major employer in the area was the nearby Brown Coal mining operation, but Hornig's father was a railway worker.

He participated in the First World War and then went on to study Evangelical Theology in Halle and Breslau. After ordination, he undertook a brief period of work as a parish vicar at Friedland (Silesia) before moving on, in 1928, to become pastor at St. Barbara's Church (as it was then designated; now Sobór Narodzenia Przenajświętszej Bogurodzicy) in Breslau, where he would remain in post till 1946.

=== Response to Nazi leadership of Germany ===
Germany underwent significant regime change in January 1933 when the NDSDAP (Nazi Party) took power, and lost little time in imposing the country's first twentieth century one-party dictatorship. On the religious front, Germany's various traditionally diverse Lutheran/Evangelical churches were encouraged to group together under the party sponsored German Christian banner, as part of a move towards a national Protestant church that would repudiate the Jewish origins of Christianity and support the Nazi state. Together with Pastor Martin Niemöller, on 11 September 1933 Ernst Hornig founded the Emergency Pastors' League ("Pfarrernotbund"), which became a Christian resistance organisation, rejecting "German Christian" and Nazi influence in Germany's Evangelical Churches. Hornig proved himself an uncompromising opponent of the government's "German Christians" project. Critically, the Emergency Pastors' League members took as an article of faith rejection of the so-called Aryan paragraph passed by the General Synod of the Evangelical Church of the old-Prussian Union (heavily influenced and infiltrated by government supporting "German Christians") earlier in September 1933. League members also accepted a duty to provide financial support to pastors who had been removed from office, sent into early retirement and/or landed with court costs and fines because of their adherence to religious convictions displeasing to the state.

Hornig was one of the principal authors and distributors of a memorandum of appeal addressed to Adolf Hitler, which was publicised in 1936, and found very great resonance in the international press because it spelled out he incompatibility of Nazi teachings on race with Christian belief: it denounced the illegal arrests of political opponents and their removal to concentration camps. It was also in 1936 that Hornig was elected "Deputy Praeses" in the leadership committee of the Naumburg Synod, held in response and diametric opposition to the government backed Breslau Synod of 1934. Hornig presented the criticism of the state sanctioned church that it had set aside moral norms opposed to the killing by government agencies of the mentally ill, and the racially driven extermination of Jews which would subsequently come to be known as the Holocaust.

In August 1939, the signing of the Nazi-Soviet non-aggression pact opened the way for a renewed partition of Poland, the military implementation of which by Germany and the Soviet Union the next month marked the outbreak of the Second World War. Hornig remained at his pastoral post throughout the fighting, and at the start of 1945 was a contemporary witness from within the city of the Red Army's three month Siege of Breslau and the city's subsequent capitulation. After much of the city had been destroyed, and following much death, on 4 May Hornig was one of four leading city clerics to demand publicly that Hermann Niehoff, the German garrison commander surrender Breslau to the Soviets. Niehoff made no answer and in the afternoon Hornig repeated the demand in an address to the troop commanders.

=== After the Second World War ===
By the time Breslau was surrendered a process of ethnic cleansing was already underway across Silesia, and the process continued for the next year or so. By the end of 1946 the ethnic German population had been almost entirely replaced by an ethnic Polish population, many of those involved having themselves been expelled from territories in the east of Poland annexed by the Soviet Union. In 1946 the Silesian province of the Prussian Evangelical Church was able to hold its first post-war provincial synod in Świdnica (formerly Schweidnitz), which had already become a Polish city. Hornig himself was expelled from Wrocław (formerly Breslau) at the end of 1946, to be followed by the remaining members of his consistory at the start of 1947. Hornig's church in the city, St. Barbara's, had been largely destroyed. Much later it would be rebuilt and in 1963 handed over to the Polish Orthodox Church. Today it is a museum Frontier changes and the accompanying ethnic cleansing caused the Silesian province of the Evangelical Church to relocate its headquarters to Görlitz in what was now the Soviet occupation zone of what remained of Germany, and Ernst Hornig became its Bishop. He soon found himself in conflict with the local secular authorities and with the new rapidly emerging one-party dictatorship ruling from Berlin. Both before and after the Soviet occupation zone had mutated, formally in October 1949, into the Soviet sponsored German Democratic Republic, Hornig spoke out for freedom and human rights, notably at the time of the savagely crushed East German uprising of 1953. He found himself subject to frequent attacks in the state media and subject to personal restrictions that included, late in 1961, the refusal of a passport to attend the Third World Council of Churches Assembly held in New Delhi.

Hornig's contributions did not go unremarked on the western side of the increasingly impermeable frontier that separated East from West Germany. The Theological Faculty at the University of Kiel awarded him an honorary doctorate in 1955 for his contribution to post-war church reconstruction and for his commitment to Church Ecumenism.

=== Retirement and death ===
Ernst Hornig retired in 1964 and took the opportunity to relocate to Bad Vilbel in the west. He used his retirement to undertake research work. His episcopal successor at Görlitz was Hans-Joachim Fränkel.

Twelve years after his arrival in the west Hornig died at Frankfurt am Main, close to his new home.

== Published work ==
- Der Weg der Weltchristenheit. Stuttgart, 2nd edition, 1958
- Breslau 1945. Erlebnisse in der eingeschlossenen Stadt. München 1975
- Die Bekennende Kirche in Schlesien 1933–1945. Geschichte und Dokumente. Göttingen 1977
- Rundbriefe aus der Evangelischen Kirche von Schlesien 1946–1950. produced by Dietmar Neß, Sigmaringen 1994
- Die schlesische evangelische Kirche 1945–1964. produced by. Manfred Jacobs. Görlitz 2001
- Rezension: Aus der Hölle von Gurs. Die Briefe der Maria Krehbiel-Darmstädter 1940–1943. In Frankfurter Allgemeine Zeitung, 3 August 1971
