= P. David Hornik =

Israeli writer (born 1954)

- Born: 1954 (age 71–72); New York City, New York, United States
- Occupations: Writer and translator
- Website: substack.com/@pdavidhornik1

P. David Hornik (born 1954) is an Israeli writer, translator, commentator, and copyeditor living in Be'er Sheva, Israel.

== Biography ==
Hornik was born in New York City and grew up not far from Albany, New York. In 1978 he completed an MA in English from Binghamton University. In 1984 he moved to Israel and has lived in Jerusalem, Tel Aviv, and Beersheba.

== Literary career ==
Up to 2003 Hornik contributed commentary to the Jerusalem Post and to American Jewish magazines such as Moment, Midstream (magazine), and others. Hornik was also a frequent book reviewer for the Jerusalem Post.

Since 2003 Hornik has contributed to PJ Media, The American Spectator, FrontPage Magazine, RealClearPolitics, American Thinker, ynetnews.com, the Jerusalem Post, and The Jewish Press, and blogged at The Times of Israel. His literary work, including poetry and short stories, has been published at National Review, New English Review, Jewish Quarterly, and Judith Magazine.

He is the author of the essay collection Choosing Life in Israel (2013), the novel You Don't Know What Love Is (2018), the short-story collection Help Me, Rhonda and Other Stories (2019), the novel Beside the Still Waters (2019), the novel And Both Shall Row (2020), and the memoir Israel--A Place to Call Home: A Real-Life Story of Aliyah (2026). He also writes the newsletter Israel on My Mind with P. David Hornik.

Hornik's fiction deals with human interaction, and with the effects of time, memory, and geography on characters' understanding of themselves and of others. His memoir likewise explores those (and other) themes in the context of his own emigration.

== See also ==
- Israeli literature
