= David Erdmann =

German theologian and historian

- Christian Friedrich David Erdmann
- Born: Christian Friedrich David Erdmann; 28 July 1821; Güstebiese, Prussia (now Poland)
- Died: 11 March 1905; Breslau, German Empire (now Wrocław, Poland)
- Education: University of Berlin
- Occupation(s): Theologian, Church Historian, Professor, Pastor
- Theological work
- Tradition or movement: Evangelical
- Main interests: Church History, Luther, Silesian Church History

David Erdmann (28 July 1821 - 11 March 1905) was a German evangelical theologian and church historian.

== Life ==
Christian Friedrich David Erdmann was born at Güstebiese (as it was then called), a village on the eastern bank of the Oder river a short distance inland and upstream from Stettin. He studied Theology in Berlin, and in 1845 became a member of the Berlin Wingolf (fraternity organisation). He received a "Privatdozent" (teaching certificate) in 1853, and in 1856 became a full professor for Theology and Church History at the University of Königsberg, also serving as a pastor.

Between 1864 and 1900 he served as General Superintendent of the Ecclesiastical College for the Prussian Union of churches in Silesia. For this job he was based in Breslau (as Wrocław was then known). In 1865 he was also appointed a full honorary professor at the university there. Between 1882 and 1899 Erdmann was chair of the Chairman of the History Association of the Evangelical Church in Silesia. He retired in 1900.

== Published output (not necessarily a complete list) ==
- Luther und die Hohenzollern, Breslau 1883, 2. Aufl. 1884
- Luther und seine Beziehungen zu Schlesien, insbesondere zu Breslau, Halle 1887
