= Wolfgang Huber (theologian) =

German bishop

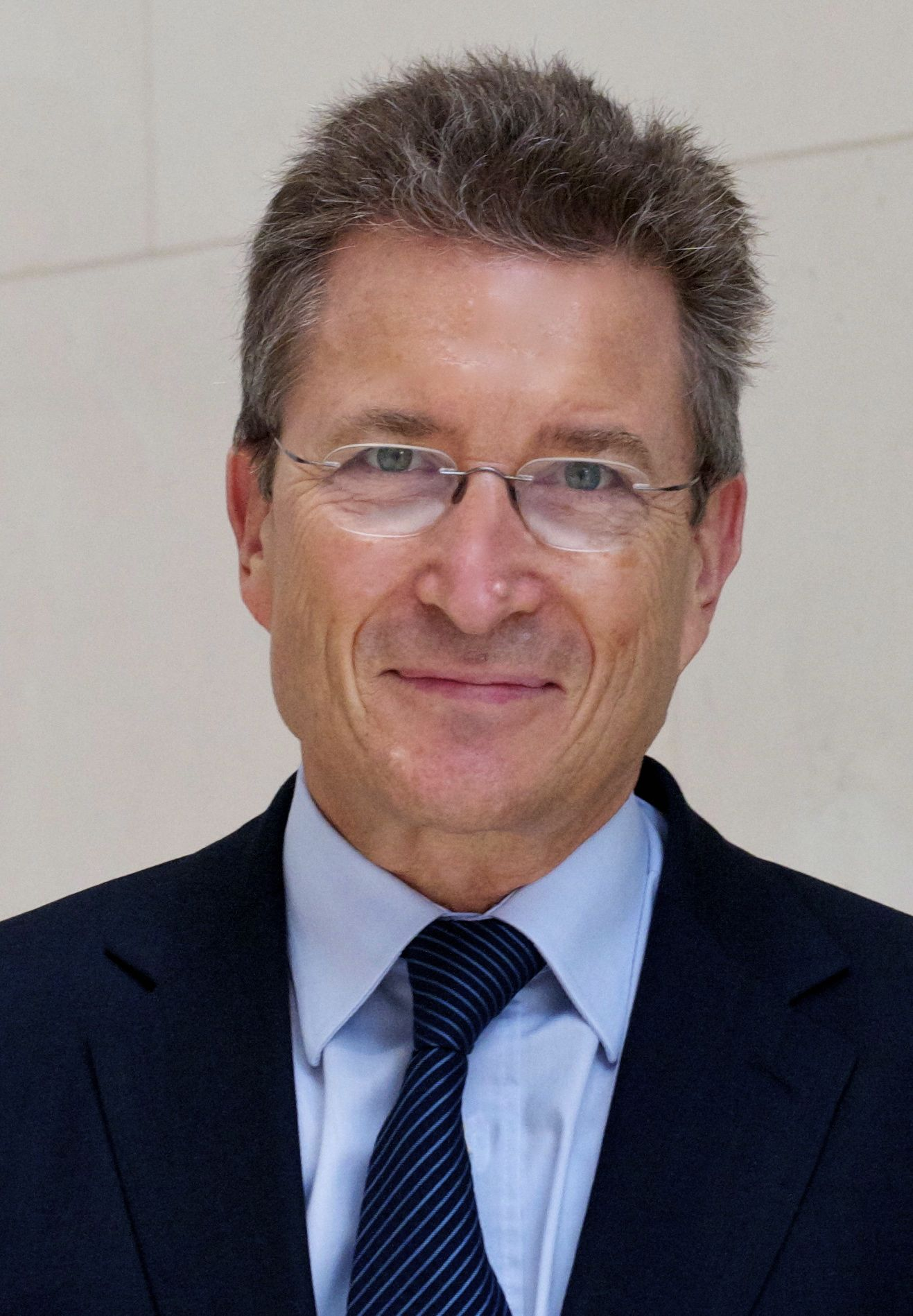
Wolfgang Huber

Wolfgang Huber (born 12 August 1942 in Strasbourg, Germany) is a prominent German theologian and ethicist. Huber served as bishop of the Evangelical Church of Berlin-Brandenburg-Silesian Upper Lusatia until November 2009. Huber succeeded Manfred Kock as Chairperson of the Council of the Evangelical Church in Germany (EKD) in November 2003 and was succeeded by Bishop Margot Käßmann, the first woman in that position, in October 2009.

== Life ==
Huber is the oldest of five sisters and grew up in Falkau in the Black Forest and later in Freiburg im Breisgau. He married the primary school teacher and author Kara Huber in 1966, and they have three children and two grandchildren. His father was Ernst Rudolf Huber, a well-known lawyer and German constitutional scholar. Huber's mother was the attorney Tula Huber-Simons.

Huber studied Protestant theology from 1960 to 1966 at the University of Heidelberg, University of Göttingen and at the University of Tübingen where he received his doctorate in 1966. He finished his Habilitation at the University of Heidelberg in 1972.

After working in the Evangelical-Lutheran Church in Württemberg from 1966 to 1968, Huber was appointed as researcher and later director of the Protestant Institute for Interdisciplinary Research in Heidelberg from 1968 until 1980. He served as a member of a number of church organizations and committees: From 1973 to 1984 as a member of the EKD's Chamber for Public Responsibility, from 1975 to 1980 as a member of the Evangelical Church of the Union's Board, from 1980 to 1994 as a member of the Deutscher Evangelischer Kirchentag's executive committee, from 1983 to 1985 as its president. He was appointed as Professor of Social Ethics at the University of Marburg in 1980, and Professor of Systematic Theology (with a focus on ethics) at the University of Heidelberg in 1984. In 1989, he was also Lilly Visiting Professor at Emory University. In 1993, he was chosen as Bishop of the Evangelical Church of Berlin-Brandenburg-Silesian Upper Lusatia, in 1997 as a member of the Council of the EKD and in 2003 as Chairperson of the council. From 1998 to 2001, Huber served as a member of the Central and Executive Committees of the World Council of Churches.

Huber retired in November 2009. Markus Dröge succeeded him as Bishop and Margot Käßmann succeeded him as Chairperson of the EKD's Council. Since retiring, Huber has resumed many of his honorary and voluntary positions, amongst others his position as Chairperson of the Stiftung Garnisonkirche Potsdam and Dean of the Domstift Brandenburg. He continues to be engaged in public ethical debates and was chosen by the German Cabinet to serve on Germany's Ethics Council in 2010. His research on ethics currently concerns the mediation of values in business and society.

Since choosing the position of Bishop of Berlin-Brandenburg above a seat in the German Bundestag for the Social Democratic Party of Germany in 1993, Huber has not associated himself with any political party publicly. He was consequently considered as a potential neutral candidate to replace the then President of Germany Horst Köhler after his resignation in 2010.

== Thought ==
Huber has worked on a wide variety and great number of ethical and theological themes. With his father, Huber edited five volumes of documents on German church-state relations. His other publications include Kirche und Öffentlichkeit (1973), Menschenrechte. Perspektiven einer menschlichen Welt (1977, with Heinz Eduard Tödt), Kirche (1979), Folgen christlicher Freiheit. Ethik und Theorie der Kirche im Horizont der Barmer Theologischen Erklärung (1983), Konflikt und Konsens. Studien zur Ethik der Verantwortung (1990), Friedensethik (1990, with Hans-Richard Reuter), Die tägliche Gewalt. Gegen den Ausverkauf der Menschenwürde (1993), Gerechtigkeit und Recht. Grundlinien christlicher Rechtsethik (1996), Kirche in der Zeitenwende. Gesellschaftlicher Wandel und Erneuerung der Kirche (1998), Vertrauen erneuern. Eine Reform um der Menschen willen (2005), Im Geist der Freiheit. Für eine Ökumene der Profile (2007), Der christliche Glaube. Eine evangelische Orientierung (2008). As a respected religious figure, academic and public intellectual, Huber continues to initiate and contribute to a wide range of themes, amongst others by means of a large number of public lectures, sermons and public discussions.

Research on Huber's thought emphasizes the centrality of the concept "communicative freedom" in his work. His theology and public engagement is characterized by the fact that Christianity is the religion of life-enabling freedom. He understands communicative freedom as a rearticulation of the Reformation's rediscovery of freedom, as is clear in his use of Martin Luther's theology to substantiate his understanding of freedom. Huber aims to reconcile individuality and sociality, by developing an understanding of freedom that transcends mere self-realisation. In his recent work, he makes use of the term "responsible freedom" to denote this comprehensive understanding of freedom.

Following the sociologist Max Weber, the theologian Dietrich Bonhoeffer and the philosopher Hans Jonas, Huber develops an ethics of responsibility for life in the context of modernity. This forms the starting point for Huber's contributions to present-day ethical questions, as can be seen in his contributions to business ethics, political ethics and bioethics.

Huber is known for his opposition to embryology research. He understands human dignity as conferred by God, and expressed by the Christian conviction that the human person is created in the "image of God". Human dignity cannot be equated with either the biological development or genetic characteristics, as this contradicts the human person as subject of freedom. In Huber's view, a human being is always a person and never simply an object.

He advocates a form of nonviolence he calls "reasonable pacifism".

== Church reform ==
As bishop and chairperson of the EKD's Council, Huber initiated and supported numerous reform programs. In the context of the challenges mainline Protestantism faces, especially in the eastern parts of Germany, Huber advocated for a missionary reorientation of the church. For him, church reform is closely connected to the rediscovery of the church's evangelical essence and requires openness to those who have distanced themselves from the Christian faith. These impulses characterize the large-scale reform process, subsumed under the theme "Church of freedom", which Huber headed. The document Kirche der Freiheit describes how the church can set its profile in society, whilst respecting societal plurality. This document formulates four goals for the reform of the Protestant church in Germany, namely (a) spiritual profiling instead of indistinct activity, (b) prioritising instead of aiming for completeness, (c) structural mobility and (d) shifting the focus of the activities of the church to the outside instead of self-contentment. In his own regional church Huber also oversaw a reform process, "Salt of the earth". Huber's tenure as chairperson of the EKD's Council also saw the incorporation of the Vereinigte Evangelisch-Lutherische Kirche Deutschlands and the Union Evangelischer Kirchen with the EKD, the streamlining of regional churches from 23 to 21, and the initiation of further reform processes.

== Ecumenical and inter-religious engagement ==
Huber continuously engages in ecumenical and inter-religious discussions. He was the hosting bishop of the first Ecumenical Church Conference in Berlin in 2003, and during his meeting with Pope Benedict XVI in Cologne in 2005 Huber expressed the wish that ecumenical relations may develop to a phase of "profiled ecumenism". This position also characterized his reaction to the Vatican's declaration in 2007 that Protestant churches cannot be regarded as churches in the true sense of the word. The Archbishop of Canterbury invited Huber to address the Nikaean Club of Archbishops in 2009, where Huber identified "ecumenism of the indicative" – namely borne from the conferred unity in Christ, of faith and of baptism – as the basis for all ecumenical relations.

Huber regards religious pluralism as a defining characteristic of contemporary society. He understands the growing influence of Muslim minorities in Western Europe (and particularly in his native Germany) as a legitimate example of growing religious pluralism. As chairperson of the EKD, Huber campaigned for an open and regular dialogue between Christian and Muslim religious leaders. His insistence on clarity ("Klarheit") and being good neighbours ("gute Nachbarschaft) – following a document published by the EKD – led to controversies within the EKD and between Protestants and Muslim conversation partners. Especially his warning not to engage in "interreligious cheating" (a formulation which he articulated for the first time in 2001) gave rise to a number of public discussions. A prominent German Muslim organisation reacted to the document published by the EKD by saying that it reinforces and legitimates existing prejudices against Islam. Huber reacted by stating the continued need for honest dialogue – including controversial themes such as freedom of religion and of the change of religion in Muslim countries.

== Awards and honorary memberships ==
- 1982: Theodor Heuss Prize (together with the Kammer der EKD für öffentliche Verantwortung)
- 1995: Honorary Professor of the Heidelberg University and the Humboldt University of Berlin
- 1999: Comenius Prize
- 2003: Kreuzpfadfinder der Christlichen Pfadfinderschaft Deutschlands
- 2004: Honorary member of the Rotary International|Rotary Club Berlin-Kurfürstendamm
- 2005: The Golden Feather of the Bauer Publishing Group
- 2006: Ludwig Wolker Badge of the German Olympic Federation
- 2006: Honorary member of the Order of Saint John (Bailiwick of Brandenburg), known as the Johanniterorden
- 2007: Grand Cross of the Order of Merit of the Federal Republic of Germany
- 2007: Hermann Ehlers Medal of the Evangelischer Arbeitskreises der CDU/CSU
- 2007: Honorary member of Hertha BSC
- 2007: Patron of the German Children's Prize
- 2008: Agricola Medal of the Lutheran Church of Finland
- 2008: Honorary doctorate from the Christian Academy in Warschau
- 2009: Order of Berlin
- 2009: European Culture Prize for Theology
- 2009: Vordenker Prize of the Plansecur Group

== Recent publications ==
- 2010: Wenn ihr umkehrt, wird euch geholfen. Oder: Anmerkungen zur globalen Finanzmarkt- und Wirtschaftskrise, Frankfurt / Main
- 2010: Das Netz ist zerrissen und wir sind frei. Reden, Frankfurt/Main
- 2010: Gottes Wort halten, Liebe üben und demütig sein. Predigten, Frankfurt/Main
- 2009: Die Liebe in der Wahrheit. Die Sozialenzyklika "Caritas in veritate" Papst Benedikts XVI. Ökumenisch kommentiert von Wolfgang Huber und anderen, Freiburg/Breisgau
- 2009: Der christliche Glaube. Eine evangelische Orientierung, 5. Aufl. Gütersloh
- 2009: Von den Grenzen der Erkenntnis und der Unbegrenztheit des Glaubens. Ein Streitgespräch zwischen Wolfgang Huber und Wolf Singer, Berlin
- 2009: Die Mauer ist weg. Ein Lesebuch, herausgegeben von Wolfgang Huber, Frankfurt am Main
- 2009: Religion, Politik und Gewalt in der heutigen Welt, in: Karl Kardinal Lehmann (Hg.), Weltreligionen – Verstehen, Verständigung, Verantwortung, Frankfurt/Main
- 2008: Die Verantwortung eines Unternehmers, in: P. May u.a. (Hg.), Familienunternehmen heute, Jahrbuch 2008, Bonn
- 2008: Habermas in protestantischer Tradition, in: Michael Funken (Hg.), Über Habermas, Darmstadt
- 2008: Die Verfassungsordnung für Religion und Kirche in Anfechtung und Bewährung. Zusammen mit Christian Waldhoff und Udo die Fabio, Münster
- 2007: Im Geist der Freiheit. Für eine Ökumene der Profile, Freiburg
- 2007: Position beziehen. Das Ende der Beliebigkeit, Lahr
- 2007: „Der Mensch ist zur Arbeit geboren wie der Vogel zum Fliegen...". Hat das protestantische Arbeitsethos noch eine Zukunft?, in: Die neue Frage nach der Arbeit, Wittenberg
- 2006: Familie haben alle. Für eine Zukunft mit Kindern, Berlin
- 2006: Gerechtigkeit und Recht. Grundlinien christlicher Rechtsethik, 3. Aufl. Gütersloh
- 2006: Dietrich Bonhoeffer Auswahl, 6 Bände, herausgegeben von Christian Gremmels und Wolfgang Huber, Gütersloh
- 2006: Wissenschaft verantworten. Überlegungen zur Ethik der Forschung, Göttingen
- 2006: Vertrauensberufe im Rechtsstaat, in: Anwaltsblatt, 8+9
- 2005: Der Staat und die Religionen, Bonn 2005 und Erfurt
- 2005: Vertrauen erneuern. Eine Reform um der Menschen willen, Freiburg/Breisgau
- 2005: Woran dein Herz hängt. Bischofsworte in bewegter Zeit, Gütersloh
- 2005: Die jüdisch-christliche Tradition, in: Hans Joas / Klaus Wiegandt (Hg.), Die kulturellen Werte Europas, 2. Aufl. Frankfurt/Main
- 2004: Vor Gott und den Menschen. Wolfgang Huber im Gespräch mit Stefan Berg, Berlin: Wichern
- 2004: Verfassung ohne Gottesbezug? Zu einer aktuellen europäischen Kontroverse. Gemeinsam mit Helmut Goerlich und Karl Kardinal Lehmann, Leipzig
- 2002: Der gemachte Mensch. Christlicher Glaube und Biotechnik, Berlin 2002
- 1999: Kirche in der Zeitenwende. Gesellschaftlicher Wandel und Erneuerung der Kirche, 3. Aufl. Gütersloh

== Literature ==
- Der tadellose Protestant. Immer freundlich, immer korrekt, immer klug – Wolfgang Huber prägte sein Amt durch maßvoll linke Ansichten und hartnäckige Sachlichkeit. In: Die Zeit Nr. 18, 23. April 2009, p. 7.
- "Gewählter Glücksfall", Steffen Reiche on Wolfgang Huber in the Märkischen Allgemeine Zeitung, 5. November 2009
- "Konflikt und Konsens", Karl Kardinal Lehmann on Wolfgang Huber in Tagesspiegel, 25. Oktober 2009
- "Aus dem Kirchenschlaf gerissen", in: Die Zeit, 22. Oktober 2009
- "Huber ist moralische Instanz geworden", Horst Köhler on Wolfgang Huber
- „Wenn eure Kinder morgen fragen." Wilfried Köpke in conversation with Wolfgang Huber, Margot Käßmann and Manfred Kock (2005)
