= Jacob Hornik =

Israeli professor (born 1942)

- יעקב הורניק
- Hornik in 2010
- Born: March 7, 1942 (age 84); Haifa, Israel
- Education: Hebrew University in Jerusalem; Syracuse University, New York
- Occupations: Vice president, Author, Marketing Professor and Consultant

Jacob Hornik (Hebrew: יעקב הורניק; born March 7, 1942) is a professor in marketing and communications, author of many books and researcher papers, and consultant; currently he is the Vice President and Head of the Management School at the w. Galil Academic College. Hornik is the author of many marketing books and recently published a new edition of the book Marketing Management with Philip Kotler of Northwestern University.

== Education and academic career ==
Hornik received his B.A. degree in economics and his M.B.A from the Hebrew University in Jerusalem. He then got a scholarship at Syracuse University for his Ph.D. in Business Administration.

== Selected publications ==
=== Books ===
- Philip Kotler & Jacob Hornik, Marketing Management: The Israeli Edition, 2002,2012 (in Hebrew), OU Publishing Tel Aviv.
- Jacob Hornik & Y. Lieberman, Advertising Management, 1998 (in Hebrew), OU Publishing Tel Aviv.
- Jacob Hornik, Surveys and Public Opinion Polls, 2001, (in Hebrew), OU Publishing Tel Aviv.

=== Articles ===
- "Inferring the distribution of households' duration of residence" (with S. Anili and M. Israeli) Journal of Business and Economic Statistics, July 2000.
- "Tactile stimulation and consumer response", The Journal of Consumer Research, Dec.1992.
- "Repeated advertising exposures: A system point approach to nonuniform insertions" (with P. Brill), Operations Research, Feb. 1988.
