= St. Mary's Church, Berlin =

St. Mary's Church
- Marienkirche
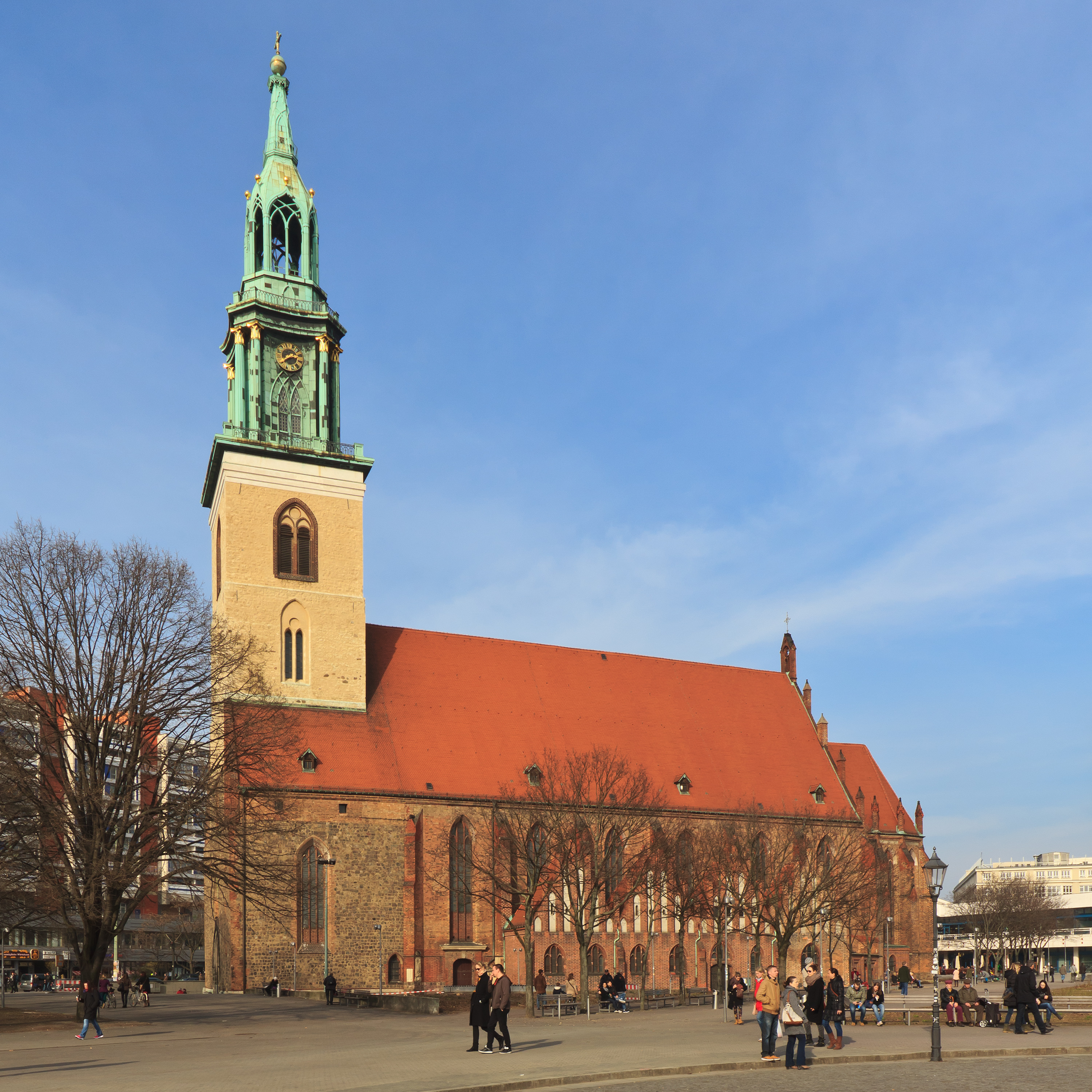
- St. Mary's Church
- 52°31′14″N 13°24′24″E
- Location: Berlin
- Country: Germany
- Denomination: Lutheran
- Previous denomination: Roman Catholic

History
- Status: Church

Architecture
- Functional status: Active

St. Mary's Church, known in German as the Marienkirche or St.-Marien-Kirche, is a church in Berlin, Germany. It is located on Karl-Liebknecht-Straße (formerly Kaiser-Wilhelm-Straße) in central Berlin, near Alexanderplatz. The exact age of the original church site and structure is not precisely known, but it was mentioned as the site of the alleged theft by Jews of the wafers in an act of Host Desecration in 1243. As a result of these charges, a number of Jews were burnt at the stake at a place later called Judenberg. It is also mentioned in German chronicles in 1292. It is presumed to date from earlier in the 13th century.

The architecture of the building is now largely composed of comparatively modern restoration work which took place in the late 19th century and in the post-war period. The church was originally a Roman Catholic church, but has been a Lutheran Protestant church since the Reformation in 1539. While keeping this confession the parish was part of the Prussian Union of churches from 1817 to 1948, an umbrella church body combining parishes maintaining mostly the Lutheran, but also some the Calvinist and few the United Protestant confession.

== Overview ==
Marienkirche is the church of the bishop of the Evangelical Church of Berlin-Brandenburg-Silesian Upper Lusatia with Berlin Cathedral being under joint supervision of all the member churches of the Union of Evangelical Churches. However, the church is not titled cathedral, a titulature not usual in German Protestantism but only colloquial for cathedral churches which used to be sees of Catholic bishops before the Reformation.

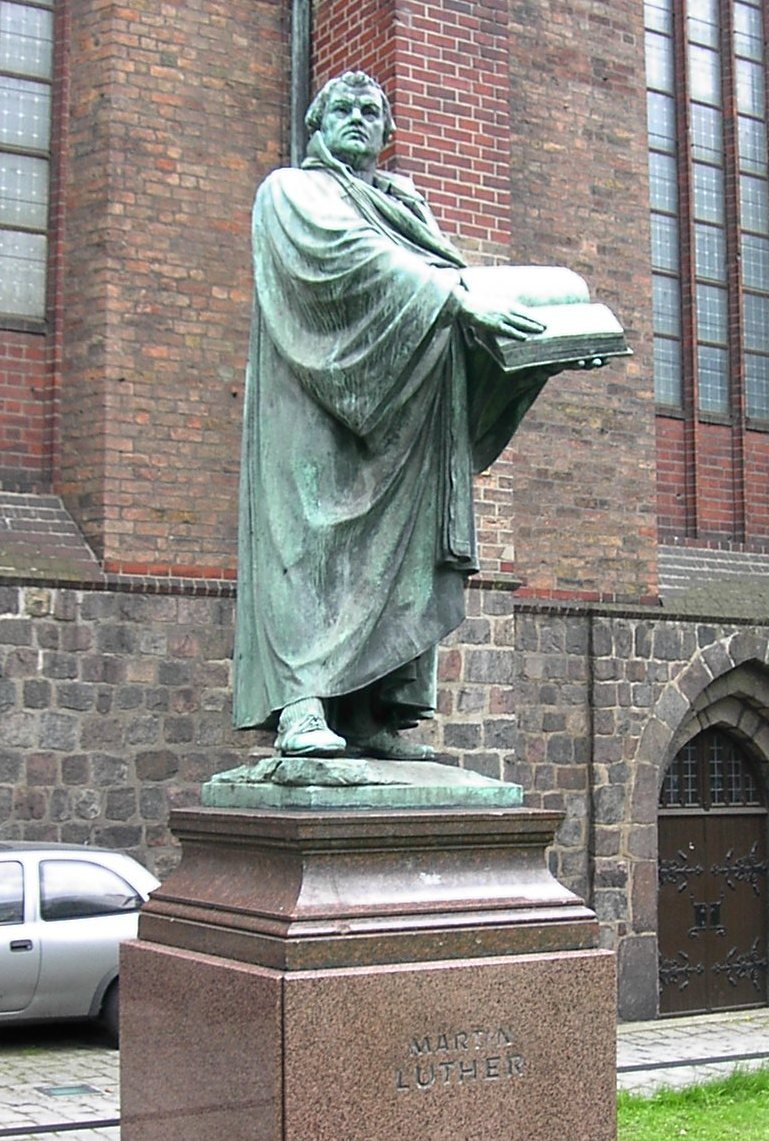
Statue of Martin Luther

Along with the Nikolaikirche, the Marienkirche is the oldest church in Berlin. The oldest parts of the church are made from granite, but most of it is built of brick, giving it its characteristic bright red appearance. This was deliberately copied in the construction of the nearby Berlin City Hall, the Rotes Rathaus. During World War II, it was heavily damaged by Allied bombs. After the war the church was in East Berlin, and in the 1950s it was restored by the East German authorities.

Before World War II, the Marienkirche was in the middle of a densely populated part (Marienviertel) of the district of Mitte, and was in regular use as a parish church. After the war, this area was cleared of ruined buildings and today the church stands in the open spaces around the Alexanderplatz, and is overshadowed by the East Berlin television tower, the Fernsehturm.

There is a striking statue of Martin Luther outside the church. The Marienkirche also contains the monumental tomb of Otto Christoph von Sparr, Generalfeldmarschall of Brandenburg-Prussia made by the Flemish sculptor Artus Quellinus the Elder possibly with the assistance of Bartholomeus Eggers. Carl Hildebrand Freiherr von Canstein, the founder of the oldest Bible society of the world, the Cansteinsche Bibelanstalt, was also buried in the church in 1719.

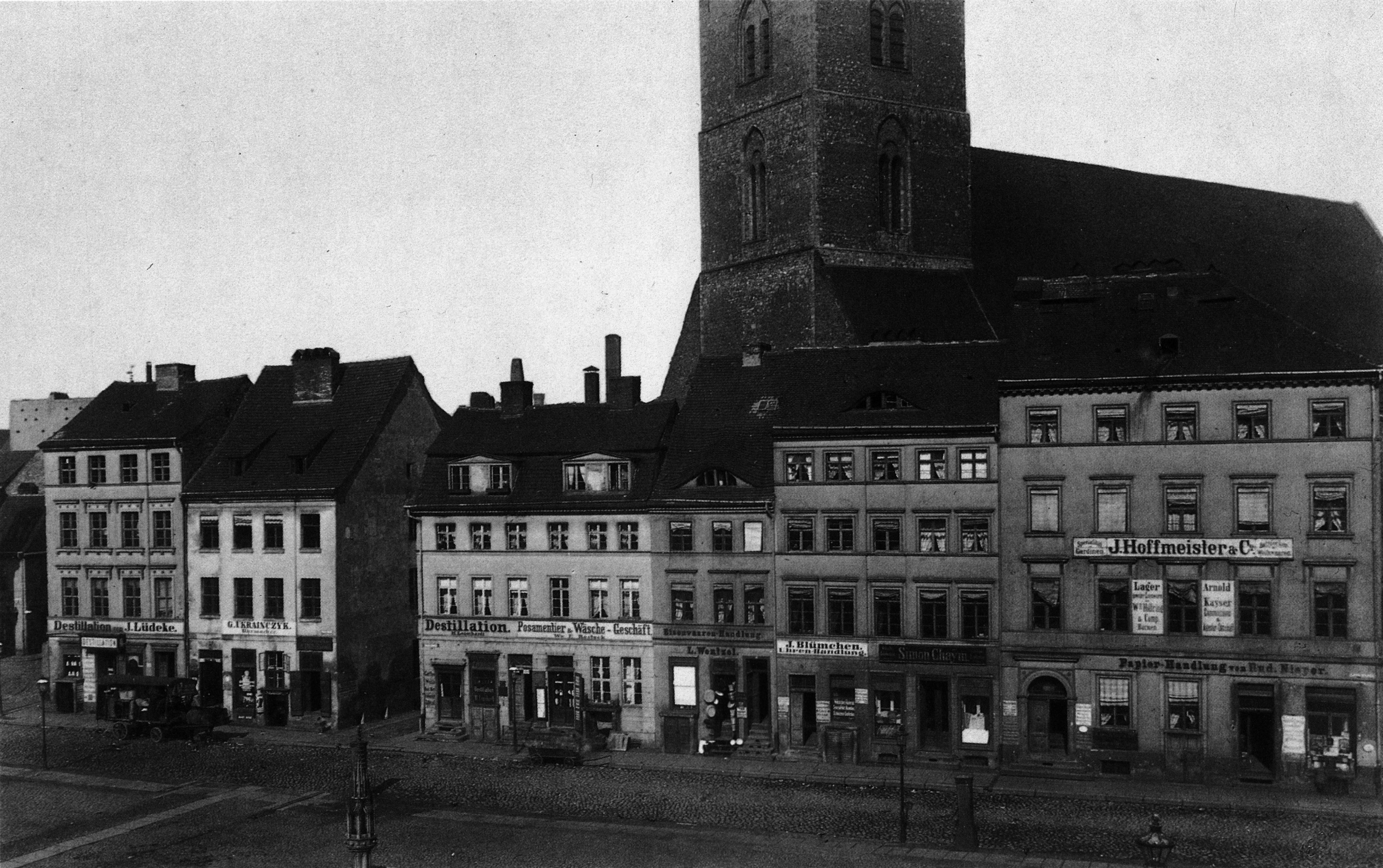
Neuer Markt and St. Mary's Church, ca. 1880

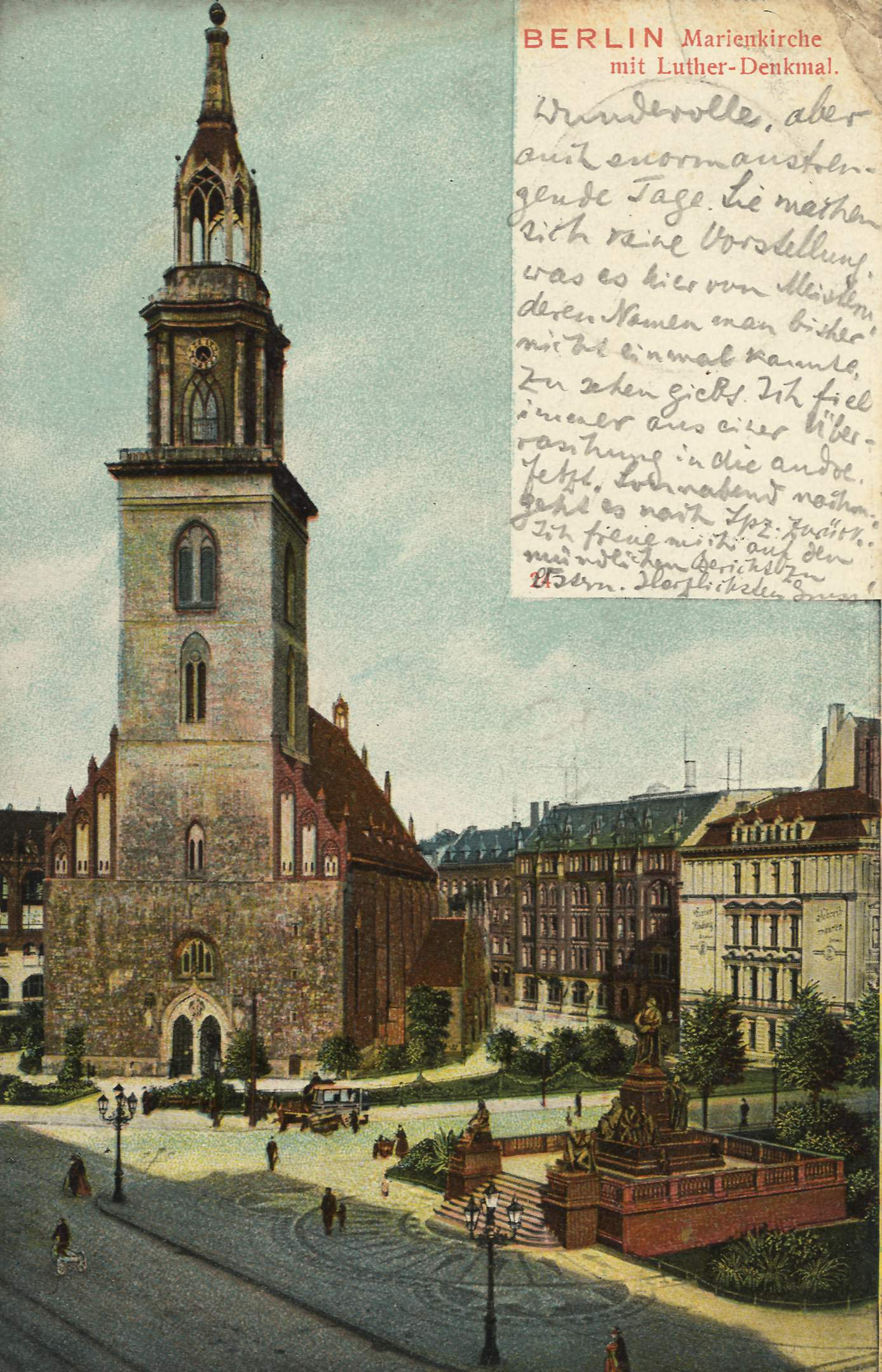
St. Mary's Church surrounded by houses of the Marienviertel and the Luther monument, 1906

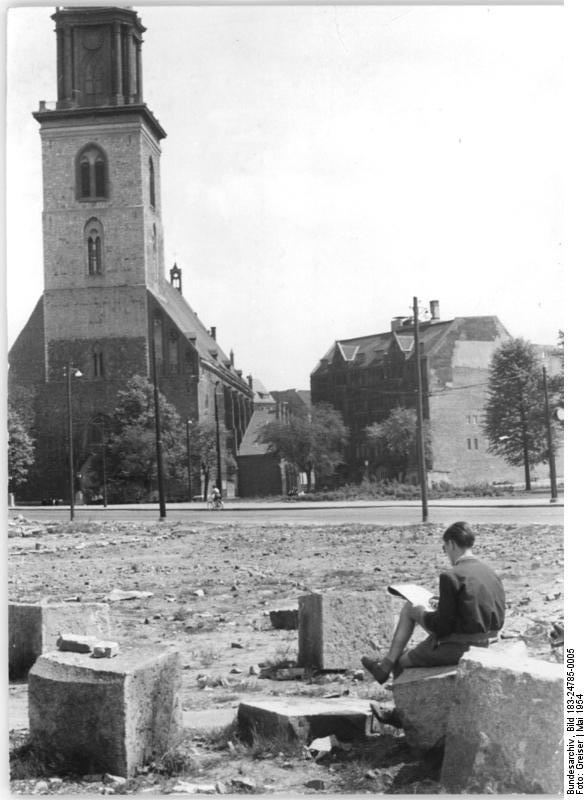
Similar perspective, 1954

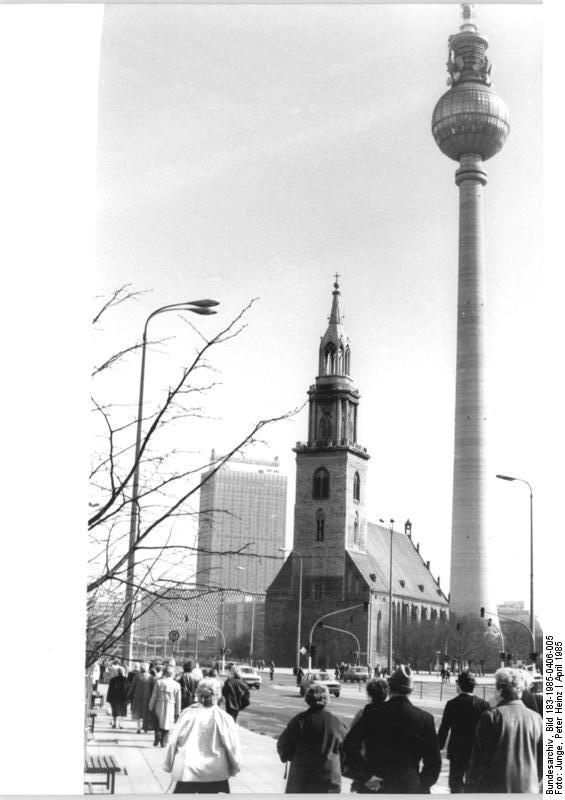
St. Mary's Church and Fernsehturm, 1985

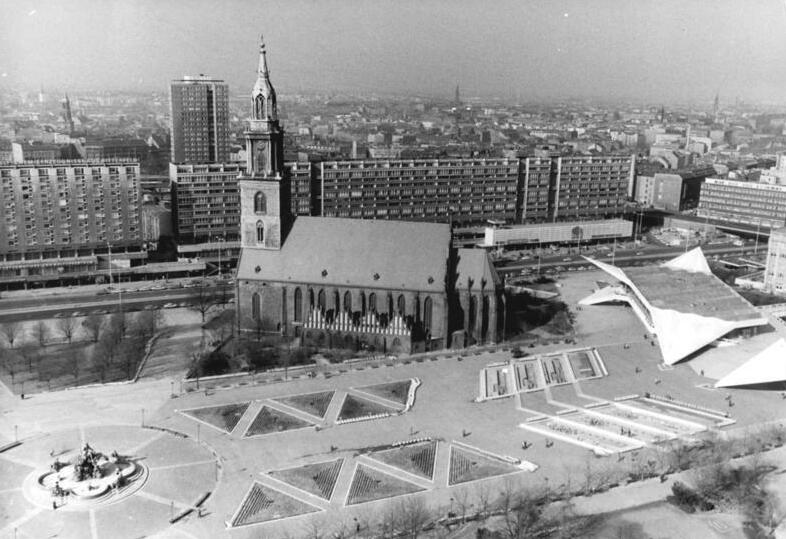
St. Mary's Church from the tower of the Rotes Rathaus, 1987

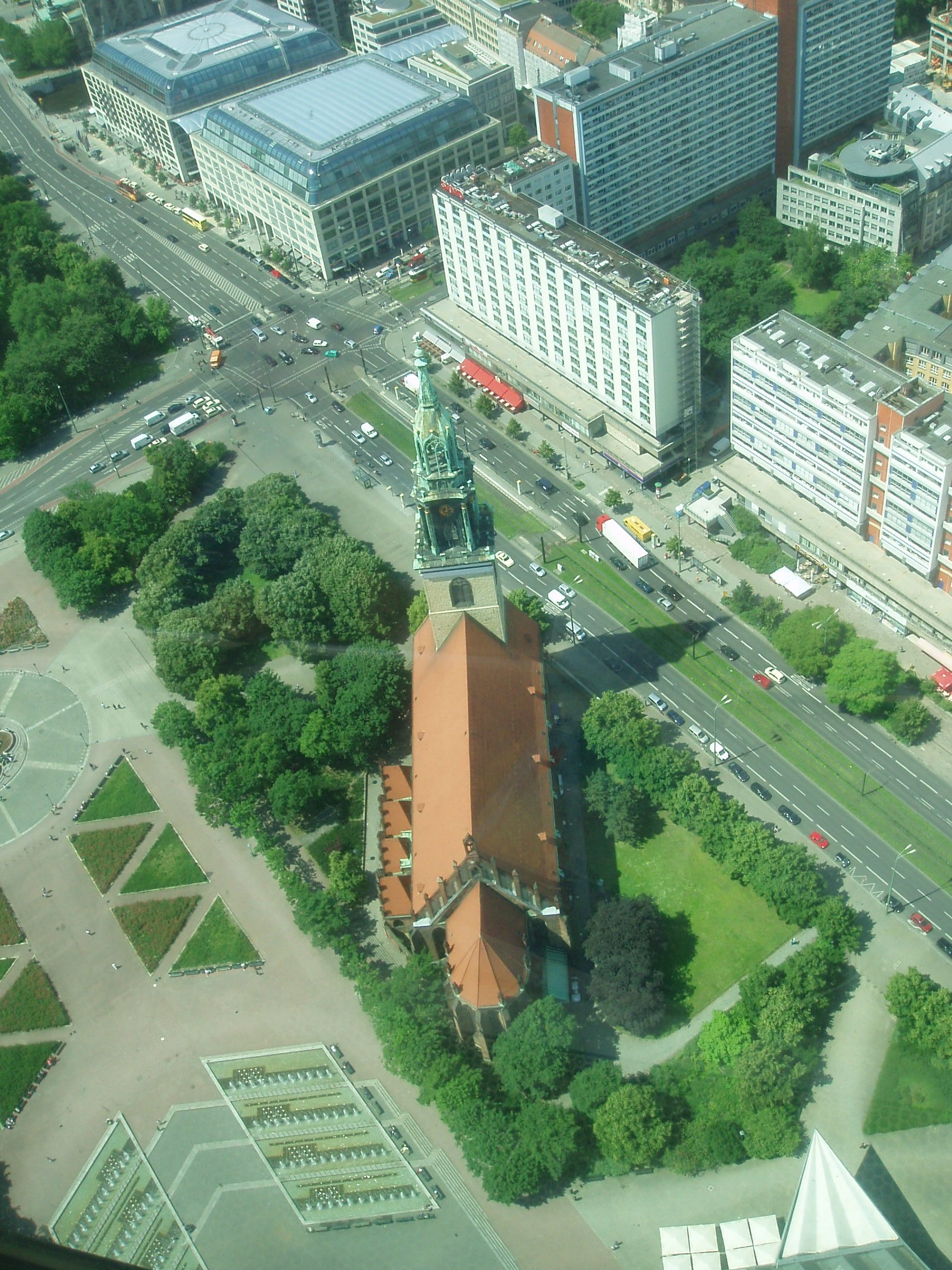
St. Mary's Church from the Fernsehturm, 2009

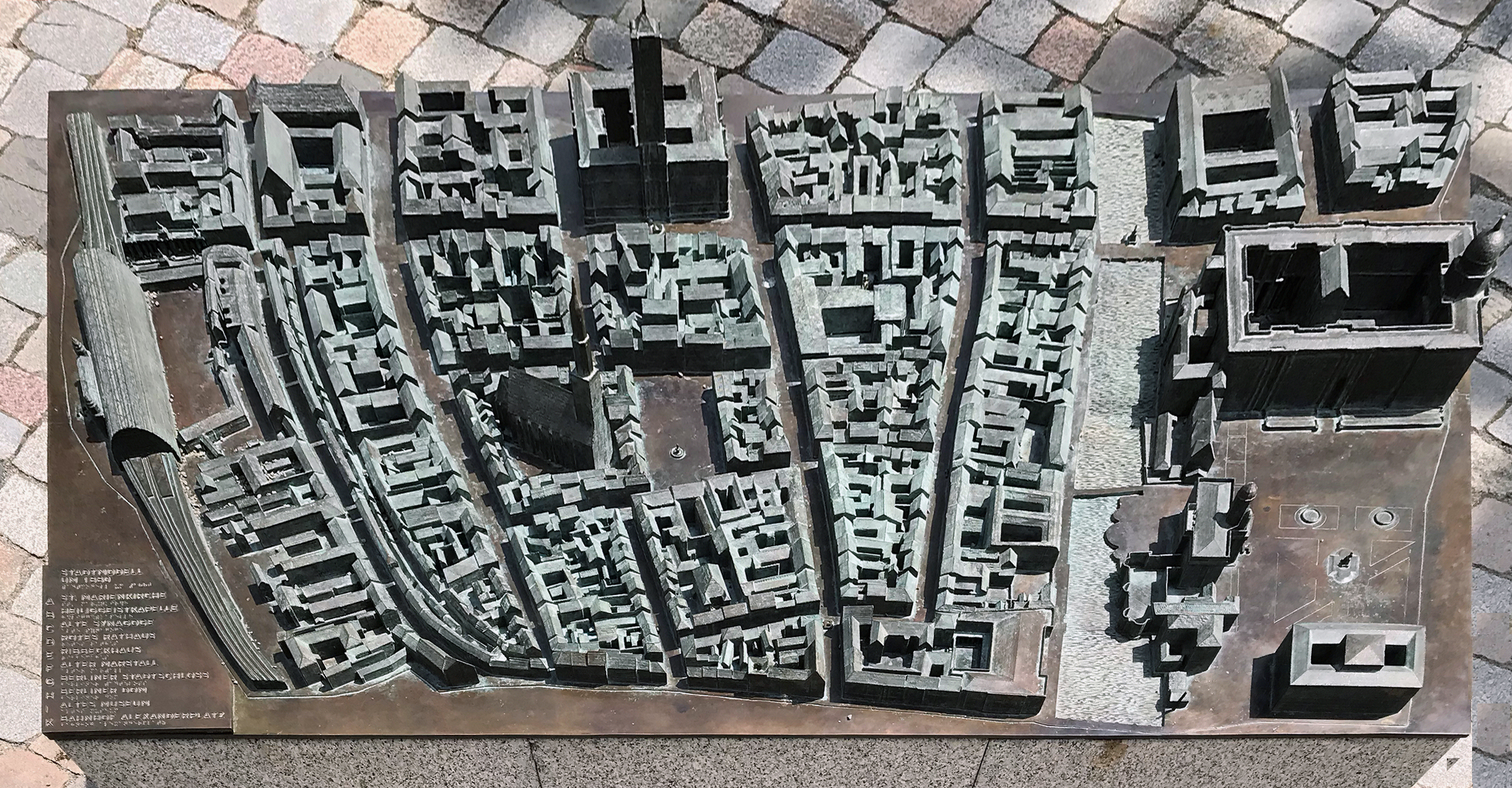
City model with St. Mary's Church in Marienviertel and Heilige-Geist-Viertel around 1880, Alexanderplatz station on the left, Berlin Palace on the right

== Personalities ==
Christoph Albrecht was notably the church's organist/choirmaster from 1976 to 1992.
