= Friedrich Naumann =

German pastor politician (1860–1919)

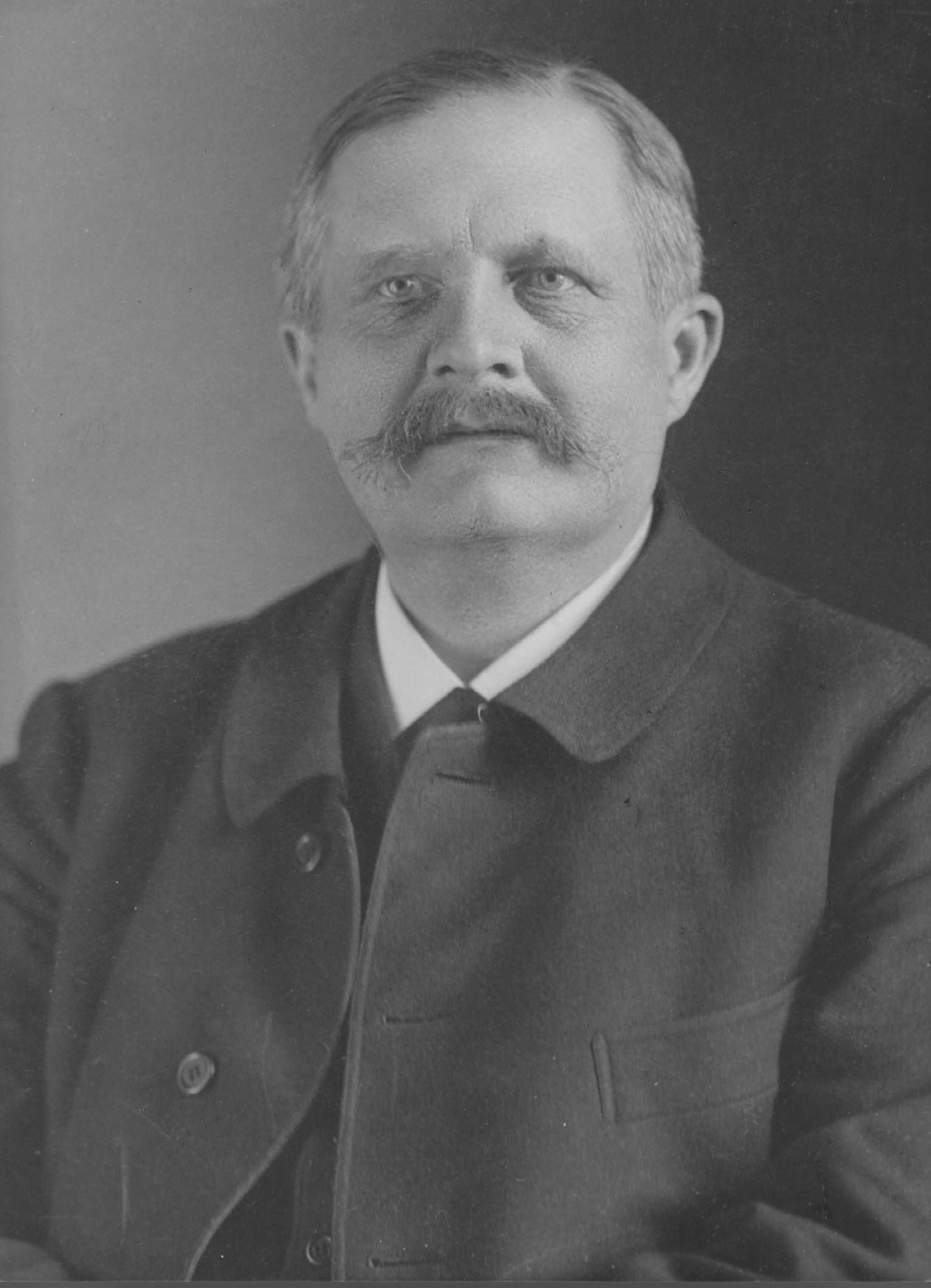

Member of the Weimar National Assembly
- In office 1919–1919
- Constituency: Berlin

Member of the German Reichstag
- In office 1907–1912
- Constituency: 3rd Württemberg (Heilbronn)
- In office 1913–1918
- Constituency: Waldeck

Personal details
- Born: 25 March 1860 Störmthal (now part of Großpösna) near Leipzig, Kingdom of Saxony
- Died: 24 August 1919 (aged 59) Travemünde, Germany
- Party: National-Social Association (1896–1903); Freeminded Union (1903–1910); Progressive People's Party (1910–1918); German Democratic Party (1918–1919)
- Spouse: Maria Magdalena Zimmermann
- Education: Leipzig University; Friedrich-Alexander University of Erlangen
- Occupation: Theologian, Politician

Friedrich Naumann (25 March 1860 – 24 August 1919) was a German liberal politician and Protestant parish pastor. In 1896, he founded the National-Social Association that sought to combine liberalism, nationalism and (non-Marxist) socialism with Protestant Christian values, proposing social reform to prevent class struggle. He led the party until its merger into the Free-minded Union in 1903. From 1907 to 1912 and again from 1913 to 1918, he was a member of the Reichstag of the German Empire.

Naumann advocated an imperialist foreign policy, laying out Germany's claim to dominate Central Europe in his 1915 Mitteleuropa plan. After the First World War, he co-founded the German Democratic Party and was elected to the Weimar National Assembly. Naumann is also somewhat controversial for his anti-Armenian statements. The Friedrich Naumann Foundation of the Free Democratic Party is named after him.

== Life ==
Naumann was born in the parsonage of Großpösna near Leipzig in Saxony, being the son of the local Lutheran pastor. He attended the St Nicholas School (Nikolaischule) in Leipzig and the Fürstenschule in Meissen, whereafter he studied Protestant theology at the universities of Leipzig and Erlangen. In 1881 he was one of the founders of the nationalist student fraternity Verein Deutscher Studenten in Leipzig. From 1883 he worked at the Rauhes Haus charity institution established by Johann Hinrich Wichern in Hamburg, before in 1886 he took over the rectorate of Lengenberg near Glauchau in Saxony. From 1890 he also served in the Inner mission in Frankfurt.

During the 1880s, Naumann was a follower of the conservative-clerical and antisemitic Berlin movement led by Adolf Stoecker and his Christian Social Party. At the 1890 Evangelical Social Congress however, he became a spokesman of the liberal wing, distancing himself from Stoecker's conservatism and antisemitism. Later he became interested in the social theories advocated by his friend Max Weber, one of the most pronounced critics of Emperor Wilhelm II. His ideal was that of helping the workers, whose miserable life circumstances he had witnessed in Hamburg. His goal was to raise interest in this issue among the middle class, however, initially he was hindered by the German middle class fear of the proletariat, who were regarded as potential revolutionaries. Naumann later tried to involve Weber in politics, but this failed due to the bad health and temper of Weber.

Starting from 1894 he published the weekly magazine Die Hilfe ("The Help") to address the social question from a non-marxist middle class point of view. To this end he wrote the short book, Soziale Briefe An Reiche Leute ("Social Letters to Wealthy People") published in Göttingen in 1895.

Together with Rudolph Sohm and Caspar René Gregory, he founded the National-Social Association in 1896; an attempt to provide a social liberal, social Christian and nationalist alternative to the Marxist, predominantly irreligious and internationalist Social Democrats. The Association tried to address the growing social rift between rich industrialists and the poor working class with social reforms rather than class struggle. In the same year, Naumann gave up his pastoral office, concentrating on his political and writing activities from then on. In his 1897 "National-Social Catechism" (structured in rhetorical questions and answers, following the model of Luther's Small Catechism) he explained the National-Social Association's fundamental conviction that "the national and the social (interest) belong together". By national(ism) he understood "the drive of the German people to expand its influence on the globe"; while he defined social(ism) as "the drive of the working masses to extend their influence within the people".

During the 1890s Hamidian massacres, Naumann became known for expressing anti-Armenianism in Die Hilfe including the famous "potter's quote" in which Naumann quoted a German potter, whom he met during his journey to the Near East in Constantinople, as stating:

I am a Christian and hold "Love thy neighbor" as the first commandment, and I say that the Turks did the right thing when they beat the Armenians to death. There is no other way for the Turk to protect himself from the Armenian. ... The Armenian is the worst type in the world. He sells his wife, his still under-aged daughter, he steals from his brother. The whole of Constantinople is being morally poisoned by the Armenians. It is not the Turks who have attacked, but the Armenians. ... An orderly means of protecting oneself against the Armenians does not exist. The Turk is acting in self-defense.

Historian Stefan Ihrig states that "Naumann had exposed a very broad audience to justifications for killing Armenians and had made Germany's ears deaf to the Armenian plight as well as anti- Armenianism 'morally' and politically more acceptable". But with regard to the Armenian genocide in 1915 Die Hilfe – still edited and led by Friedrich Naumann – wrote:

Neither could the German-Turkish alliance be a legitimation "for a massacre of the Armenians to an extent which has not been seen in history as yet. There is no doubt that one must be allowed to deplore the Armenian people's adverse fate and to say openly that not all Armenians, most importantly not the entire Armenian people, are hostile to the Turkish – without being blamed as a traitor to our good cause! Also the German press has to discuss the Armenian question without prejudice!"

Later in his life, Naumann worked for a rapprochement of German social democratic and liberal movements, but faced major opposition from conservatives. Industrialists like Freiherr von Stumm called Naumann and his associates "Allies of the Socialists". Naumann wanted to preserve Christian values, which he hoped would improve the fraught relations between workers and corporate businessmen. The National-Social Association failed in the German elections of 1898 and 1903 and was then dissolved into the Freeminded Union. Naumann became a member of the Reichstag parliament upon the 1907 federal election.

In 1907, he co-founded the Deutscher Werkbund association. On the eve of World War I, Naumann proved to be a monarchist, but his sympathy for the German emperor Wilhelm II had vanished since the well-known Daily Telegraph Affair of 1908. He espoused a kind of liberal imperialism, signing the 1914 Manifesto of the Ninety-Three, and still in 1918 backed the "Anti-Bolshevist League" of Eduard Stadtler. On the other side Naumann supported the Peace Resolution, with which the Reichstag offered peace negotiations without annexations in 1917.

In 1919, Friedrich Naumann was among the founders of the social liberal German Democratic Party (Deutsche Demokratische Partei, DDP) with Theodor Wolff and Hugo Preuss. As a member of the Weimar National Assembly, he became one of the "Fathers of the Constitution" of the Weimar Republic, and, shortly before his death, was elected as the first president of the Democratic Party.

== Death ==
Naumann had long been worn down by overwork and war-related malnutrition due to the Blockade of Germany. He traveled to the Baltic Sea to recuperate. On the morning of August 24, he suffered a stroke and died that afternoon.

== Reception ==
Naumann is often considered an advocate of German nationalism with militarist and annexionist ideals, due to his book Mitteleuropa (1915) on the geopolitics of a Central Europe under German leadership. The work had a great public impact, though it did not affect the military strategy of World War I. Like many scholars of his time, Naumann upheld the theories of Social Darwinism and Volksgemeinschaft. He shared his views with the intellectual circles he frequented, including not only Max Weber, but also Lujo Brentano, Hellmut von Gerlach, young Theodor Heuss, his wife Elly Heuss-Knapp, and Gustav Stresemann.

For Jürgen Frölich (de), historian at the Archive of Liberalism, Naumann is "a key figure in German liberalism in the late Kaiserreich", who saw his political goals mainly realized, when just before the end of war the Constitution of the German Empire adopted an amendment, which turned the state into a short living parliamentary democratic monarchy. The historian Götz Aly wrote in 2011 that Naumann "distorted liberalism beyond recognition and completed the turn to nationalist power and popular welfare politics". While Naumann was not a forerunner of the Nazis' antisemitism, Aly accused him of having "combined social, imperial, and national thought into a cohesive intellectual current that could eventually blend with the NSDAP's mindset".

== See also ==
- Liberalism in Germany
- List of liberal theorists
