= Adolph Wagner =

German economist and politician

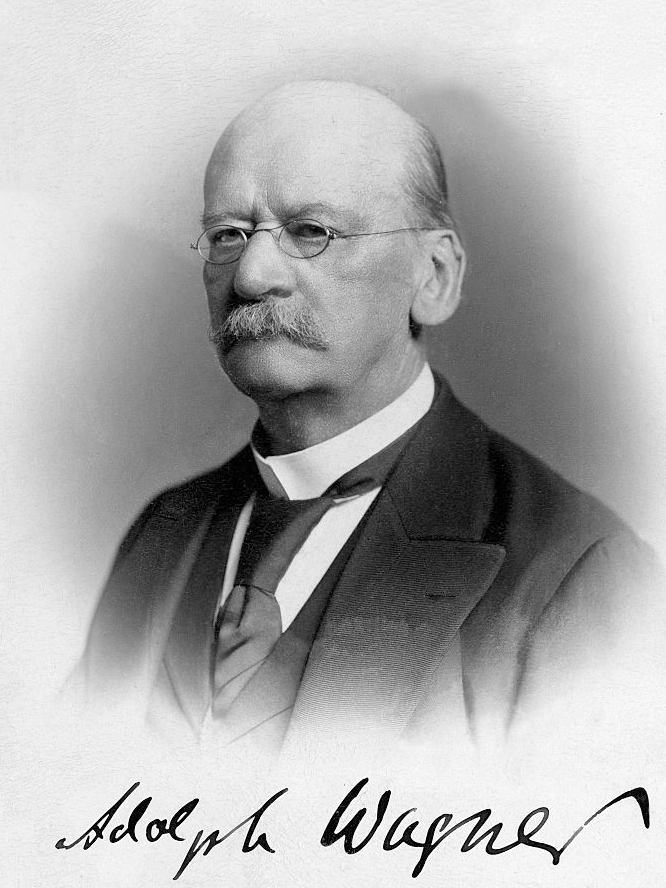
- Born: 25 March 1835; Erlangen, Landgericht Erlangen, Middle Franconia, Kingdom of Bavaria, German Confederation
- Died: 8 November 1917 (aged 82); Berlin, Kingdom of Prussia, German Empire
- Education: University of Göttingen; Heidelberg University
- Known for: Wagner's law
- Scientific career
- Fields: Economics
- Workplaces: Friedrich-Wilhelm University of Berlin; Imperial University of Dorpat; Albert Ludwig University of Freiburg
- Doctoral advisor: Georg Hanssen
- Doctoral students: Lujo Brentano; Werner Sombart

Adolph Wagner (25 March 1835 – 8 November 1917) was a German economist and politician, a leading Kathedersozialist (academic socialist) and public finance scholar and advocate of agrarianism. Wagner's law of increasing state activity is named after him.

== Biography ==
Born in Erlangen as the son of a university professor, the physiologist Rudolf Wagner, Adolph studied economics at the University of Göttingen, receiving a doctorate in 1857 under the supervision of Georg Hanssen. Wagner's academic career took him first to the Merchants’ Superior School, Vienna (1858–1863), then – after failing to secure a chair at the University of Vienna because of disagreements over fiscal policy with Lorenz von Stein – to the Hamburg Higher Merchants’ School (1863–1865), both institutions comparable to business schools today. In 1865, he took the chair of Ethnography, Geography, and Statistics (in reality an economics professorship) at the Imperial University of Dorpat in Livonia which is located in the present day Estonia, but was then part of the Russian Empire.

In Dorpat (Tartu), Wagner "became a follower of Bismarck’s policy for unifying Germany under Prussian guidance. Thus when German unification became realistic, Wagner wanted to go back to Germany proper.

Beginning Fall Term 1868/69, Wagner therefore took over the Chair of the Cameralistic subjects (roughly, state management) at the Badensian University of Freiburg im Breisgau, and very soon afterwards, in 1870, the Chair of Staatswissenschaften at the University of Berlin, by that time not only the premier university in Germany but probably in the world. It was in Berlin, that Wagner began his tenure as one of the most intellectually and politically influential economists of his time.

A former student of his, Werner Sombart, was his successor at the economics chair of the University of Berlin.

Wagner was an early member of the conservative Christian Social Party, founded in 1878 by Adolf Stoecker as the Christlichsoziale Arbeiterpartei (Christian Social Workers' Party). Wagner was also one of the leading figures in the Conservative Central Committee (CCC), established in 1881. The CCC soon formed into the anti-Semitic Berlin movement, in which Wagner worked with Adolf Stoecker, among others.

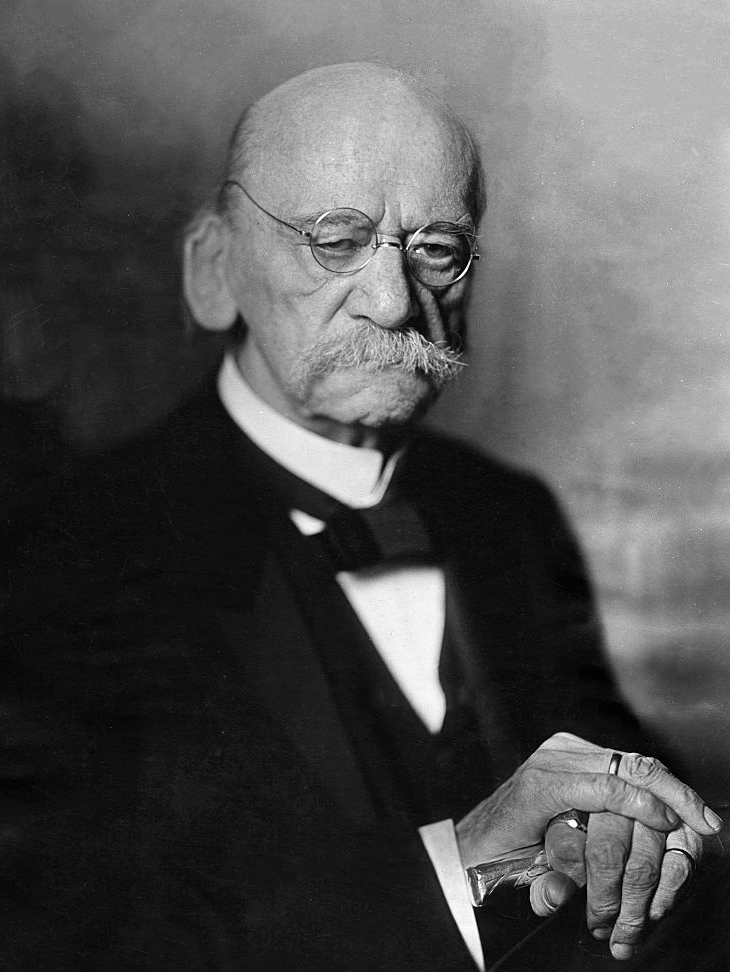
Adolph Wagner by Nicola Perscheid c. 1910

Wagner died in Berlin in 1917.

== Work ==
Wagner is the main protagonist of a specific school of economics and social policy, called "State Socialism" ("Staatssozialismus"), which is a specific form of Kathedersozialismus. (Albert Schäffle (1831–1903), Lujo Brentano (1844–1931), Gustav von Schmoller (1838–1917) and Karl Rodbertus(-Jagetzow) (1805–1875) were important protagonists of that thought as well.) He was a member of the Historical school of economics, as his general review essay on Marshall's Principles of Economics so clearly demonstrates. However, he did fundamentally differentiate himself from what he called the 'younger' and more 'extreme' members of the German historical school such as Gustav von Schmoller who, according to Wagner, tended to dismiss too hastily what the latter terms the more deductive work of English writers (in short, those in the tradition of classical economics, including the famous contemporary Cambridge University Professor Alfred Marshall whose book he was reviewing).

== Character ==
Wagner had a very combative and harsh personality. He did not take insults lightly and never phrased things diplomatically. He had difficulties with Schmoller and was an enemy of Lujo Brentano – and these two were about his closest colleagues.

By all contemporary accounts, it is probably fair to say that Wagner was vain, easily hurt and extremely choleric.

In the 1890s, Wagner would so enrage an industrial-conservative member of the Reichstag, likewise with a defense of the Kathedersozialist influence within the university, that the deputy challenged him to a duel. (Wagner did not categorically refuse, but it was never fought.)

An even more famous case was Wagner's altercation with Eugen Dühring (against whom Friedrich Engels' Anti-Dühring is directed), and which in the very end resulted in Dühring's remotion and dismissal from the University of Berlin.

== Legacy ==
Together with Gustav von Schmoller, Wagner belongs to the most important economists of the Bismarck period. He was a member of the Verein für Socialpolitik (Society for Social Policy).

Wagner formulated the law of increasing state spending, also known as "Wagner's law."

His works set the stage for the development of the monetary and credit systems in Germany and substantially influenced the central bank policy and financial practice before World War I.

== Publications ==
- Wagner, Adolph (1864). Die Gesetzmässigkeit in den scheinbar willkührlichen menschlichen Handlungen vom Standpunkte der Statistik. Hamburg: Boyes & Geisler.
- Wagner, Adolph (1866). Beiträge zur Finanzstatistik des Schulwesens in den Städten des Ostseegouvernements Livland, Kurland und Esthland. Dorpat: Als Manuscript gedruckt. / Druck von C. Matthiesen.
- Wagner, Adolph (1866). "Die auswärtige Politik Rußlands und ihre Bedeutung für Preußen." Preußische Jahrbücher, vol. 18, no. 6 (December), pp. 657–692.
- Wagner, Adolph (1867). "Statistik." In Deutsches Staats-Wörterbuch, vol. 10. Leipzig: Expedition des Staats-Wörterbuchs, pp. 400–481.
- Wagner, Adolph (1868). Die russische Papierwährung. Riga: Kymmel.
- Wagner, Adolph (1870). Die Abschaffung des privaten Grundeigenthums. Leipzig: Duncker & Humblot.
- Wagner, Adolph (1892). Grundlegung der politischen Ökonomie. Part 1, vol. 1. 3rd edn. Leipzig: Winter.
- Wagner, Adolph (1895). Die akademische Nationalökonomie und der Socialismus. Berlin: Julius Becker.
- Wagner, Adolph (1900). Allgemeine und theoretische Volkswirtschaftslehre oder Sozialökonomik. (Theoretische National-Oekonomie.). Berlin: Als Manuskript gedruckt.
- Wagner, Adolph (1902). Agrar- und Industriestaat. Die Kehrseite des Industriestaats und die Rechtfertigung agrarischen Zollschutzes mit besonderer Rücksicht auf die Bevölkerungsfrage. 2nd edn. Jena: Fischer.
- Wagner, Adolph (1904). Die finanzielle Mitbeteiligung der Gemeinden an kulturellen Staatseinrichtungen und die Entwickelung der Gemeindeeinnahmen.Jena: Fischer.
- Wagner, Adolph (1916). Staatsbürgerliche Bildung. Berlin: Verlag "Bodenreform".
- Wagner, Adolph (1948). Finanzwissenschaft und Staatssozialismus. August Skalweit, ed. Frankfurt/Main: Klostermann.

In English

- Wagner, Adolph (1939). "Speech on the Social Question" (abridged), in Donald O. Wagner, ed. Social Reformers. Adam Smith to John Dewey. New York: Macmillan, pp. 489–506.

Letters

- Wagner, Adolph (1978). Briefe – Dokumente – Augenzeugenberichte, 1851–1917. Heinrich Rubner, ed. Berlin: Duncker & Humblot.
