= Wichern =

Wichern is a surname. Notable people with the surname include:

- Caroline Wichern (1836–1906), German music educator and composer, daughter of Johann
- Johann Hinrich Wichern (1808–1881), German Lutheran theologian, founder of the Home Mission
- Nadine Jean Wichern Chief, Civil Appeals Division, Office of the Attorney General of the State of Illinois (2015-present)
