= Steiermark (disambiguation) =

Steiermark may refer to:

- Styria, federal state in southeast Austria
- Duchy of Styria in the Holy Roman Empire
- Reichsgau Steiermark, administrative division of Nazi Germany
- Steiermark, merchant vessel, turned into German auxiliary cruiser Kormoran

== See also ==
- Untersteiermark, the German name for Lower Styria in Slovenia
