= Stella Stocker =

American composer

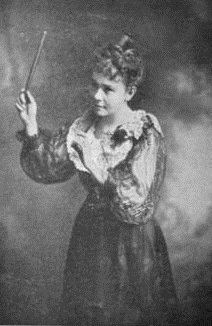
Stella Stocker

Stella Prince Stocker (3 April 1858 – 29 March 1925) was an American composer, choral conductor, and early ethnomusicologist of Ojibwe traditions.

== Life and career ==
Stella Prince was born in Jacksonville, Illinois, to parents Dr. David and Lucy Manning Chandler Prince. Her father directed the David Prince Sanatorium in Jacksonville. She graduated from the Conservatory of Music in Jacksonville and the University of Michigan in 1880 with a B.A. degree, and continued her studies at the Sorbonne in Paris. She studied but did not graduate from Wellesley College, but did give an address at a memorial for Wellesley founder Henry Fowle Durant in 1889. She studied piano with Xaver Scharwenka and counterpoint and composition with Bruno Oscar Klein in New York City, piano with Frau Gliemann in Dresden, and voice with Giovanni Sbriglia. After completing her studies, she worked as a musician, composer and lecturer in Europe and America.

In 1885, Stocker married Samuel Marston Stocker, a Duluth physician who was working at her father's hospital. Soon after the couple moved to Duluth, Minnesota. There, Stella ran the Cecilian Society music school out of the family home, and she founded and directed the Duluth Cecilian Chorale Society, which in 1900 became the Matinee Musicale. The latter organization succeeded in attracting many musical artists to perform in Duluth, including Augusta Öhström Renard and Edward MacDowell.

In Minnesota, Stocker began in-depth studies of the music and traditions of the Ojibwe. She visited the Mille Lacs, Leech Lake, Nett Lake, Fond Du Lac, White Earth, and Red Lake Indian Reservations. Her photographs and diaries of the Ojibwe form an important primary source record for Ojibwe cultural traditions. During the course of these visits, she corresponded with other early ethnographers like Frances Densmore, and was given or gave herself the Ojibwe name O-mes-qua wi-gi shi-go-que (Red sky lady).

Based on these early ethnographic observations, Stocker presented herself as an expert on American Indian music and culture. She held exhibits and lectures in North America and in Europe on her experiences and observations, and she transcribed and composed works based on the music she heard. One notable staged work was the pageant Sieur Du Lhut, composed after attending the 1916 annual White Earth Celebreation and Pow Wow.

Her light opera Ganymede was staged twice in 1902; first in Duluth as a fundraiser for the Duluth Home Society, and again at Carnegie Lyceum (now Zanker Hall), at a benefit for the Vassar Students' Aid Society.

She frequently traveled to Europe with her children to lecture and study. In 1901 she stayed in Bergdorf and befriended Caroline Wichern. For a time she lived in New York where she lectured on music for the New York City Board of Education, often on Indian music.

She had a son, Arthur, a promising singer who died of pneumonia at age 14, and a daughter, Clara. Clara spent a long career teaching music, French, and Finnish in Duluth. Stocker's husband was forced to retire from medicine in 1918; he died 11 years later in the Fergus Falls State Hospital for the Insane.

Stocker died in Jacksonville, Florida in 1925. The Cecilian Society and Matinee Musicale that she founded in Duluth helped a memorial concert later in the year, benefitting the MacDowell Fund. A collection of her papers is housed at the University of Minnesota Library in Duluth.

== Works ==
Stocker composed instrumental and choral works and also for theater. Selected works include:

- Ganymede, light opera in three acts (1893), libretto by Stocker. 13 pieces from the operetta were published in New York in 1902, including Nectar Song, Macaroni Song, and Song of the Novice. Selections were first performed in Duluth in 1893 by the Cecilian Chorale Society.
- Evelyn, a Musical Fairy Tale (1908)
- Sieur du Lhut, a "Historical Play in Four Acts with Indian Pageant Features and Indian Melodies" (1916), premiered in 1917 at the Duluth Orpheum Theater with Louis Dworshak in the title role. Published in 1917 by the Huntley Printing Co of Duluth.
- Marvels of Manabush Indian pantomime, libretto by Stocker.
- Beulah, Queen of Hearts operetta
- Raoul operetta
- Almighty Father, anthem for mixed voices
- One Kiss, song, published by Chicago Music Co
- While Thou Wert By, song, published by Chicago Music Co
- Tell me, Daisy, song, words by Mary Mapes Dodge, published in Dodge's magazine St. Nicholas
- Hymn to St. Cecelia
- Now Softly Close Thine Eyelids, Sweet, song, published by Ditson & Co.
