= Maurenbrecher =

Maurenbrecher is a German surname. Notable people of the surname include the following:

- Max Maurenbrecher (1874–1929), German publicist, pastor and politician
- Wilhelm Maurenbrecher (1838–1892), German historian
