= German Student Association =

German fraternity association

Verband der Vereine Deutscher Studenten
- VVDSt
- Founded: August 6, 1881; 144 years ago Germany
- Type: Studentenverbindung umbrella association
- Affiliation: Independent
- Status: Active
- Emphasis: Non-dueling, color-bearing
- Scope: International
- Colors: Black, White and Red
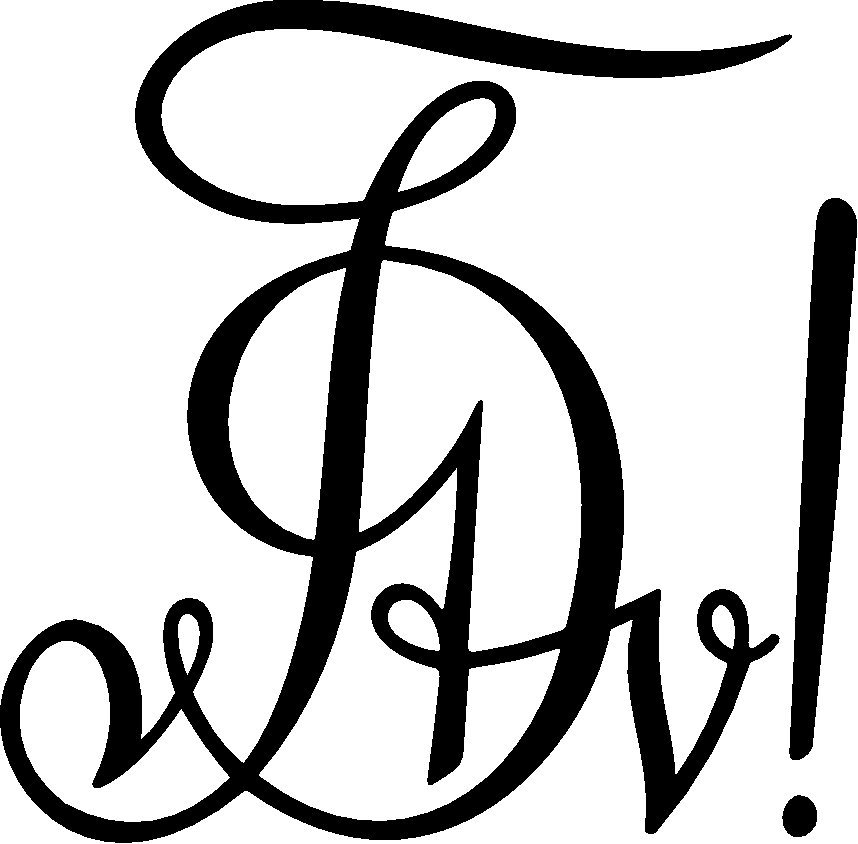
- Zirkel
- Publication: Akademische Blätter
- Chapters: 40 student associations
- Former name: Kyffhäuserverband
- Headquarters: Germany
- Website: vvdst.org

The Verband der Vereine Deutscher Studenten (VVDSt), previously the Kyffhäuserverband or Kyffhäuser Association (VVDSt-KV), is an umbrella organization of fraternities called Verein Deutscher Studenten (VDSt)) that are located in 40 cities in Germany and Austria. Its members are non-dueling and non-color-bearing student associations. VVDSt was established in 1881.

== History ==
The first Verein Deutscher Studenten were founded in 1881 in Berlin, Halle, Leipzig, Breslau, Greifswald und Kiel as non-dueling, color-bearing studentenverbindung or student associations as various academies. Kyffhäuserverband was established on August 6, 1881, under the leadership of Diederich Hahn and Friedrich Naumann as an association for these groups. Its guiding principles were Germanness, Monarchy, and Christianity. Its motto was Mit Gott für Volk und Vaterland! translated as “With God for Emperor and Empire”. Its publication, Akademische Blätter, was founded in 1886.

Kyffhäuserverband name changed to Verband der Vereine Deutscher Studenten (VVDSt) or the Association of German Student Association after World War II.

== Symbols ==
Ribbons and hats are not traditionally worn. However, the association does have colors which are black, white, and red. These colors have been used by German student associations since 1871 as a symbol of national unification, coming from the federal flag of the Northern German Confederation and, later, the national colors of the German Empire.

The association's emblem is a triangle with the point pointing downwards and has the colors black, white, and red from the outside to the inside. It is used as the association's pin that is worn on the left lapel. This "KV pin" was introduced in 1922 and featured the black, white, and red triangle with a silver border.

Its principles and goals are lifelong bonds, tolerance, democracy, tradition, policy, scientific nature, friendship, and Christian values.

== Member associations ==
As of 2024, the member associations of VVDSt include:

- VDSt Aachen-Breslau II
- VDSt Berlin & Charlottenburg
- VDSt Bielefeld
- VDSt Bonn
- VDSt Braunschweig
- VDSt zu Bremen
- VDSt Breslau-Bochum
- VDSt Clausthal
- VDSt Dresden
- VDSt Erlangen
- AV! Frankfurt-Sachsenhausen
- VDSt Freiberg, in Freiberg
- VDSt Freiburg, in Freiburg im Breisgau
- VDSt Fünfkirchen
- VDSt Gießen
- VDSt Göttingen
- VDSt Graz
- VDSt Greifswald
- DSt Halle-Wittenberg
- DSt Hannover
- VDSt Heidelberg
- VDSt Karlsruhe
- VDSt Kiel
- VDSt Cologne
- VDSt Königsberg-Mainz
- VDSt Leipzig
- VDSt Leoben
- VDSt Linz
- VDSt Magdeburg
- VDSt Mannheim
- VDSt Marburg
- VDSt Munich
- VDSt Münster
- VDSt Osnabrück
- VDSt Straßburg-Hamburg-Rostock
- VDSt Stuttgart
- VDSt Tübingen
- VDSt Vienna “Philadelphia”
- VDSt Würzburg-Jena

== Notable members of VVDSt associations ==
- Otto Dibelius (1880–1967)
- Johannes Dieckmann (1893–1969)
- Hermann Ehlers (1904–1954)
- Wolfgang Finkelnburg (1905–1967)
- Ferdinand Friedensburg (1886–1972)
- Hans Fritzsche (1900–1953)
- Heinrich George (1893–1946)
- Hellmut von Gerlach (1866–1935)
- Helmut Hasse (1898–1979)
- Wolfgang Heine (1861–1944)
- Richard Heinze (1867–1929)
- Rudolf Heinze (1865–1928)
- Sepp Helfrich (1900–1963)
- Otto Hoetzsch (1876–1946)
- Joachim Hossenfelder (1899–1976)
- Wolfgang Huber (1942–)
- Georg Kelling (1866–1945)
- Gerhard Kittel (1888–1948)
- Wilhelm Kube (1887–1943)
- Rudolf Lehmann (1890–1955)
- Hanfried Lenz (1916–2013)
- Hubertus, Prince of Löwenstein-Wertheim-Freudenberg (1906–1984)
- Max Maurenbrecher (1874–1929)
- Ernst Meumann (1862–1915)
- Joachim Mrugowsky (1905–1948)
- Ludwig Müller (1883–1945)
- Rudolf Nadolny (1873–1953)
- Friedrich Naumann (1860–1919)
- Karl Ernst Osthaus (1874–1921)
- Otto Peltzer (1900–1970)
- Kurt Scharf (1902–1990)
- Gustav Adolf Scheel (1907–1979)
- Otto Tumlirz (1890–1957)
- Otmar Freiherr von Verschuer (1896–1969)
- Ernst Wahle (1889–1981)
- Augusto Weberbauer (1871–1948)
- Kuno von Westarp (1864–1945)
