= Max Maurenbrecher =

German publicist, pastor and politician

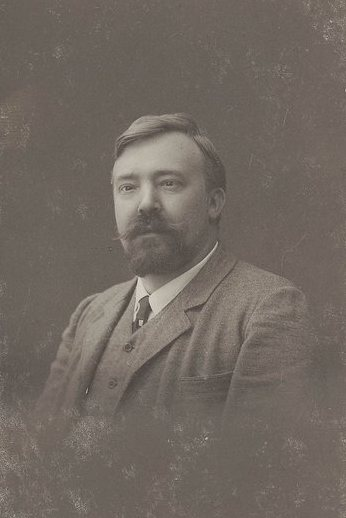

Personal details
- Born: 17 July 1874 Königsberg
- Died: 30 April 1929 (aged 54) Osthausen
- Party: National-Social Association; Social Democratic Party of Germany; German Fatherland Party; German National People's Party
- Spouse(s): Hulda Bluschke; Magdalena Bluschke
- Children: 3 sons, 2 daughters
- Occupation: Theologian, Politician, Publicist

Max Heinrich Maurenbrecher (17 July 1874 – 30 April 1929) was a German publicist, pastor and politician. He served as a pastor in the Evangelical State Church of Prussia's older Provinces until 1907. From 1909 to 1916, he preached for the free religious congregations in Nuremberg and Mannheim. In 1917 he rejoined the evangelical church and became a minister in Dresden.

== Life ==
Originally a member of the Christian Social Party, he left that party in 1899 and became one of the leading members of Friedrich Naumann's National-Social Association, a party that sought to challenge the Social Democrats by addressing class inequity from a Protestant, non-Marxist perspective; the party succeeded in winning only one seat in the Reichstag, in 1903, before dissolving. Maurenbrecher then became a member of that party's rival, the Social Democratic Party. He left the SPD in 1916 in a dispute over increasing the military budget, joined the conservative German Fatherland Party in 1917, and finally joined the German National People's Party after the war.

Maurenbrecher was an admirer of Friedrich Nietzsche, who greatly influenced his thinking.

== Bibliography ==
- Goethe und die Juden (Goethe and the Jews), 1921, Ernst Boepple's Deutscher Volskverlag.

== See also ==
- Evangelical Social Congress (for which Maurenbrecher was a secretary)
