= Sepp Helfrich =

Austrian Nazi governor of Styria

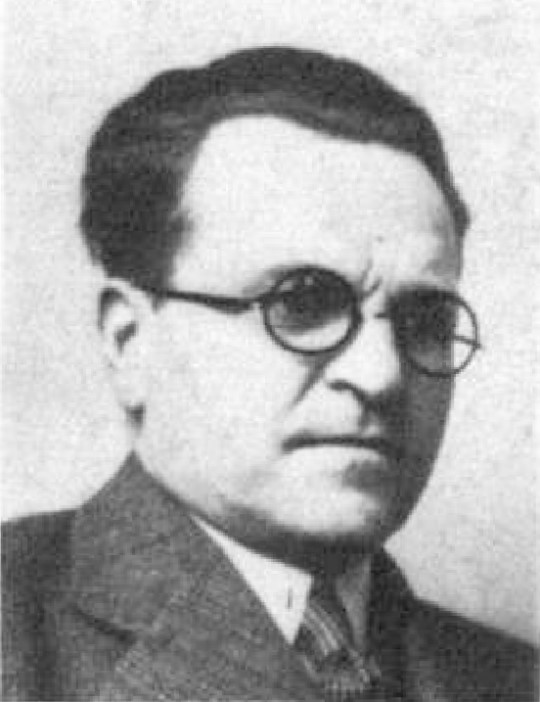
- Helfrich in January 1938

Landeshauptmann of Styria
- In office 12 March 1938 – 22 May 1938
- Preceded by: Rolph Trummer
- Succeeded by: Siegfried Uiberreither

Reichstag Deputy
- In office 10 April 1938 – 8 May 1945
- Preceded by: Position created
- Succeeded by: Position abolished

Personal details
- Born: 7 July 1900 Lugos, Kingdom of Hungary, Austria-Hungary
- Died: 27 January 1963 (aged 62) Graz, Styria, Austria
- Party: Nazi Party
- Education: Graz University of Technology; University of Natural Resources and Life Sciences, Vienna
- Profession: Civil engineer

Military service
- Allegiance: Austria-Hungary
- Branch/service: Austro-Hungarian Army
- Years of service: 1918
- Unit: 3rd Rifle Regiment
- Battles/wars: World War I

Sepp Helfrich (7 July 1900 – 27 January 1963) was an Austrian engineer employed by the state government of Styria. He joined the Nazi Party and, following the unification of Austria with Germany in 1938, served as the Landeshauptmann (governor) of Styria from March until May. He was elected to the German Reichstag in April 1938 and served until the end of the Second World War in May 1945. He was arrested for his Nazi past but did not receive any severe punishment. He resumed employment with the state government of Styria until his death in 1963.

== Early life and education ==
Helfrich was born in Lugos in Austria-Hungary and attended elementary schools in Weißkirchen (present-day Bela Crkva in Serbia), Krems an der Donau and Göllersdorf, and secondary schools in Stockerau and Graz. After graduation, he joined the Austro-Hungarian Army during the last year of the First World War and served with the 3rd Rifle Regiment on the Italian front from March to November 1918. He then served with a student defense guard unit in the Austro-Slovene conflict in Carinthia between December 1918 and March 1919.

Helfrich then returned to school to study agronomy and construction at the Graz University of Technology until 1921 and subsequently studied at the University of Natural Resources and Life Sciences in Vienna. He finished his studies in 1926 with a civil engineering degree. While he was in college, he was a member of the Verein Deutscher Studenten (German Student's Club) in Graz. In 1928, he obtained employment with the Agricultural Technology Service of the state government of Styria in Graz.

== Nazi Party career ==
On 1 May 1933, Helfrich joined the Nazi Party (membership number 1,620,345). In March 1937, he was arrested for Nazi activities. Immediately following the Anschluss when Austria united with Nazi Germany, Helfich was released and appointed as Landeshauptmann (governor) of Styria on 12 March 1938. However, he was only in this position until 22 May when he was succeeded by Siegfried Uiberreither, the Nazi Party Gauleiter of Gau Styria. At the 10 April 1938 parliamentary election, Helfrich was elected as a deputy to the German Reichstag, a seat he retained until the fall of the Nazi regime.

== Post-war life ==
At the end of the Second World War in 1945, Helfrich was arrested for his Nazi past but did not receive any severe sanction or punishment. He resumed his civil service career, working as a senior agricultural construction officer in the Styrian state government in Graz from 1949 to 1963.
