= Siegfried Uiberreither =

Austrian Nazi politician (1908–1984)

Sigfried Uberreither
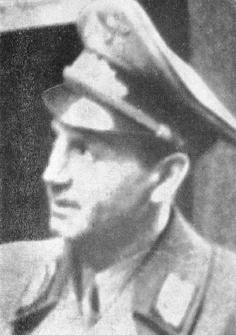
- Uiberreither in 1934

Gauleiter of Reichsgau Styria
- In office 24 May 1938 – 8 May 1945
- Appointed by: Adolf Hitler
- Deputy: Tobias Portschy
- Preceded by: Position created
- Succeeded by: Position abolished

Reichsstatthalter of Reichsgau Styria
- In office 1 April 1940 – 8 May 1945
- Appointed by: Adolf Hitler
- Preceded by: Position created
- Succeeded by: Position abolished

Landeshauptmann of Styria
- In office 9 June 1938 – 1 April 1940
- Preceded by: Sepp Helfrich
- Succeeded by: Position abolished

Personal details
- Born: Sigfried Josef Überreither; 29 March 1908 Salzburg, Duchy of Salzburg, Austria-Hungary
- Died: 29 December 1984 (aged 76) Sindelfingen, Baden-Württemberg, West Germany
- Cause of death: Alzheimer's disease
- Resting place: Burghaldenfriedhof in Sindelfingen
- Party: Nazi Party
- Other political affiliations: Deutsche Nationalsozialistische Arbeiterpartei
- Spouse: Käte Wegener (m. 1939)
- Relations: Alfred Wegener (father-in-law)
- Children: 4
- Education: University of Graz
- Occupation: Health Insurance Executive
- Profession: Lawyer
- Civilian awards: Golden Party Badge

Military service
- Allegiance: Nazi Germany
- Branch/service: German Army (1935–1945)
- Years of service: 1939–1940
- Rank: Leutnant
- Unit: 3rd Mountain Division
- Battles/wars: Invasion of Norway
- Military awards: Iron Cross, 2nd class War Merit Cross, 1st and 2nd class

Siegfried Uiberreither (29 March 1908 – 29 December 1984) was an Austrian Nazi Gauleiter and Reichsstatthalter of the Reichsgau Styria during the Third Reich.

== Early life ==
Born in Salzburg, he was the son of an engineer named Josef Überreither. The family name was officially changed to Uiberreither in June 1933. Uiberreither attended Volksschule and Realschule in Salzburg and, in 1924, joined the Schill Youth (Schilljugend), a right-wing youth organization founded by Gerhard Roßbach. In 1927, he joined the Austrian Nazi Party. From 1927 to 1933, he studied law and political science at the University of Graz while working as a construction worker. From 1930 to 1938, he was employed as a secretary and, later, executive secretary for the Workers' Sickness Fund (Arbeiterkrankenkasse) in Graz. In 1933 he joined the Sturmabteilung (SA), serving in SA-Standarte 27 in Graz. In July 1933, the month after the Austrian Nazi Party was outlawed by Austrian Chancellor Engelbert Dollfuß, Überreither graduated from his studies with a Doctor of Law degree. He remained active in the underground Party as an ideological officer (1935-1937) and, from October 1937, leader (Führer) of the illegal SA-Brigade 5, "Mittel-Steiermark", based in Graz.

== Career after the Anschluss ==
Following Austria's Anschluss with Nazi Germany on 12 March 1938, Uiberreither was promoted to SA-Brigadeführer and was named Acting Police President for Graz. At the parliamentary election of 10 April, he was elected as a Nazi deputy to the Reichstag from the newly renamed Ostmark. On 24 May 1938, Adolf Hitler appointed him Gauleiter of Gau Styria. Additionally, on 9 June he was named Landeshauptmann of Styria, thus uniting under his control the highest party and governmental offices in his jurisdiction. On 1 October 1938, Uiberreither officially joined the Nazi Party with membership number 6,102,560. On 9 November of the same year, he was advanced to the rank of SA-Gruppenführer.

In May 1939 Uiberreither married Käte Wegener (1918–2012), the daughter of Alfred and Else Wegener. They had four sons. In October 1939 he entered military service as a mountain trooper (Gebirgsjäger) with the 3rd Mountain Division and participated in the German landings in Norway. He was awarded the Iron Cross, 2nd class and the War Merit Cross, 1st and 2nd class. In July 1940, he was discharged from the Wehrmacht with the rank of Leutnant in the reserves.

On 1 April 1940, a new more centralized administrative structure went into effect in Austria. The federal States were abolished and the country was divided into seven Reichsgaue, each headed by a Reichsstatthalter (Reich Governor) reporting directly to Hitler. Uiberreither was appointed Reichstatthalter of Reichsgau Styria. On 14 April 1941, after the conquest of Yugoslavia, he was named the Chief of Civil Administration in the occupied area of Lower Styria (now part of Slovenia). This was an area of 6,050 square kilometers with a population of approximately 530,000. Uiberreither was given a mandate by Hitler to "Make this territory German again for me." Accordingly, Uiberreither oversaw a policy of ruthless Germanization. He convened a meeting on 6 May 1941 at Maribor to plan measures that resulted in the expulsion to Serbia of tens of thousands of Slovenes in three waves beginning in July 1941. The Slovene language was banned and place names were Germanized. These repressive actions led to increased partisan attacks upon German occupation authorities and their local collaborators.

In addition, the Aktion T4 program of euthanasia involving mentally impaired individuals was operational within Styria and Lower Slovenia at this time. It is estimated that over 500 patients from various mental care facilities were gassed to death at the Hartheim Euthanasia Center near Linz. Also, 62 children and teenagers were killed at the Feldhof hospital in Graz.

On 30 January 1939, Uiberreither was awarded the Golden Party Badge. On 16 November 1942, he was appointed the Reich Defense Commissioner for his Reichsgau. On 9 November 1943, he was promoted to SA-Obergruppenführer. In September 1944 he became the leader of the Volkssturm in Styria, a last-ditch Nazi Party militia set up towards the end of the Second World War and associated with the Nazi "Werwolf" organization. This consisted of conscripted males between the ages of 16 and 60 who were not already in the military. Uiberreither was also charged with construction of defensive positions against the anticipated assault by the Red Army, which involved the procurement of forced civilian labor.

== Postwar life ==
In May 1945, after the Allies had overrun the Reich and Hitler was dead, Uiberreither was arrested in Murau by British authorities and later testified as a defense witness at the Nuremberg Trials. He was held at the former Dachau concentration camp but he fled in 1947 when he learned of plans to hand him over to Yugoslavia for prosecution. There were unconfirmed reports that he escaped to Argentina, though this is disputed. It is known that he eventually lived with his family in Sindelfingen, Germany, under an assumed name, Friedrich Schönharting. He died there in 1984, reportedly of Alzheimer's disease.

== Sources ==
- Broszat, Martin (1981). The Hitler State: The Foundation and Development of the Internal Structure of the Third Reich. New York: Longman Inc. ISBN 978-0-582-48997-4.
- Höffkes, Karl (1986). Hitlers Politische Generale. Die Gauleiter des Dritten Reiches: ein biographisches Nachschlagewerk. Tübingen: Grabert-Verlag. ISBN 3-87847-163-7.
- Miller, Michael D.; Schulz, Andreas (2021). Gauleiter: The Regional Leaders of the Nazi Party and Their Deputies, 1925–1945. Vol. 3 (Fritz Sauckel - Hans Zimmermann). Fonthill Media. ISBN 978-1-781-55826-3.
