= National-Social Association =

National-Social Association Nationalsozialer Verein
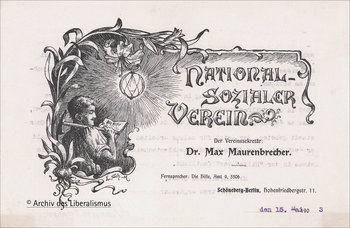
- Chairman: Friedrich Naumann (1896–1903)
- Vice Chairmen: Caspar René Gregory (1896–1897); Paul Göhre (1897–1898); Adolf Damaschke (1898–1903)
- Party Secretary: Martin Wenck (1897–1901); Max Maurenbrecher (1901–1903)
- Founded: 23/25 November 1896; 127 years ago
- Dissolved: 29/30 August 1903; 120 years ago
- Split from: Evangelical Social Congress
- Merged into: Free-minded Union
- Headquarters: Leipzig (1896–1898); Berlin (1898–1903)
- Newspaper: Die Hilfe; Die Zeit
- Membership: About 3.000 (upon dissolution)
- Ideology: German nationalism Christian socialism Social liberalism
- Political position: Left-wing
- Colours: Yellow

The National-Social Association (German: Nationalsozialer Verein, NSV) was a political party in the German Empire, founded in 1896 by Friedrich Naumann. It sought to synthesise liberalism, nationalism and non-Marxist socialism with Protestant Christian values in order to cross the ideological front lines and draw workers away from Marxist class struggle. However, it never grew beyond a minor party of intellectuals which failed to gain mass support in elections.

== History ==
In the second half of the 19th century, Germany underwent a rapid industrialization, which was connected with rising social problems. As a result of this, the Social Democratic Party of Germany (SPD) was founded and soon outlawed under the first Chancellor of the German Empire Otto von Bismarck. After the party was legalized again in 1890 (the year Bismarck resigned), it enjoyed considerable success at elections. Since the SPD was Marxist, using Karl Marx's Das Kapital for their theoretical underpinnings, the ruling classes considered it a threat.

In 1896, Friedrich Naumann, a Protestant parish priest, founded the National-Social Association. The establishment is seen as a reaction to the rise of socialism and an attempt to offer a moderate social liberal alternative guided by Protestant Christian principles as opposed to the secularism of the SPD, to the new masses of the working class. It was influenced by the political theories of Max Weber, who helped founding the party. In accordance with Weber's teachings, the party believed that working class and bourgeoisie should join hands for a strong German Empire, economic growth and social progress, therefore the party strove to dismantle the ideological divisions between socialists, left and national liberal and Christian parties.

The ideology of the association was labeled by its thought leader first as "national socialism on a Christian basis" (nationaler Sozialismus auf christlicher Grundlage) and "social imperialism" (soziales Kaisertum), later as "proletarian-bourgeois integral liberalism" (proletarisch-bürgerlicher Gesamtliberalismus), meaning a mix of nationalism, Christian socialism and social liberalism. Naumann's party advocated a stronger role for the parliament, but did not question the leading position of the monarch.

Publications of the party included the weekly newspaper Die Hilfe (The Help) and the short-lived daily newspaper Die Zeit (The Time). Furthermore, there were a number of regional and local papers who had close ties with the association.

In the elections of 1898 and 1903, the candidates of the association failed to gain seats and Naumann dissolved the party, merging into the centrist liberal Free-minded Union. However, the newspaper Die Hilfe outlived the party and continued to advocate Naumann's ideology.

Despite its name, the National-Social Association is considered a liberal party and had no relation to the 20th century Nazi Party, except their shared rejection of Marxism and claim to great power status for the German Empire.

== Notable members ==
- Wilhelm Bousset
- Ludwig Curtius
- Martin Dibelius
- Adolf Damaschke
- Gustav Adolf Deissmann
- Gustav Frenssen
- Heinrich Gelzer
- Hellmut von Gerlach
- Paul Göhre
- Caspar René Gregory
- Theodor Heuss
- Max Maurenbrecher
- Friedrich Naumann
- Karl Rathgen
- Wilhelm Rein
- Rudolph Sohm
- Gustav Stresemann
- Ferdinand Tönnies
- Gottfried Traub
- Max Weber
- Johannes Weiss

== See also ==
- Liberalism in Germany

== Bibliography ==
- Düding, Dieter (1905). Der Nationalsoziale Verein 1896-1903: Der gescheiterte Versuch einer parteipolitischen Synthese von Nationalismus, Sozialismus und Liberalismus. München: Oldenbourg. ISBN 3486438018.
- Fehlberg, Frank (2012). Protestantismus und Nationaler Sozialismus: Liberale Theologie und politisches Denken um Friedrich Naumann. Bonn: Dietz. ISBN 978-3801242107.
- Göhre, Paul (1899). "The Social Objects of the National-Social Movement in Germany". American Journal of Sociology. 4 (6): 765–773. doi:10.1086/210855.
- Na, Inho (2003). Sozialreform oder Revolution: Gesellschaftspolitische Zukunftsvorstellungen im Naumann-Kreis 1890–1903/04. Marburg: Tectum. ISBN 3828885624.
- Wenck, Martin (1905). Die Geschichte der Nationalsozialen von 1895 bis 1903. Berlin: Hilfe.
