= Rauhes Haus =

Social service institution in Germany founded in 1833

Coordinates: 53°33′14″N 10°04′20″E

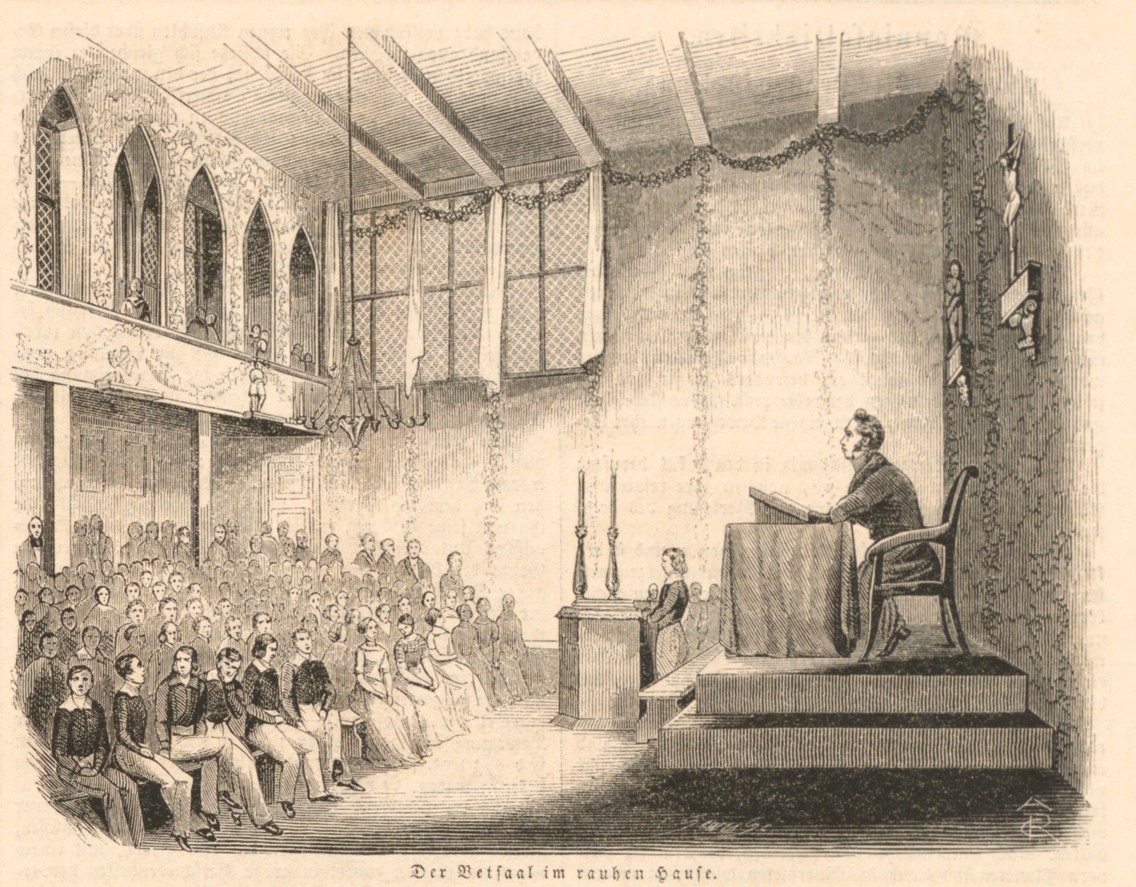
Drawing from inside the Rauhes Haus.

Rauhes Haus is a social service institution, founded in 1833 and located in Hamburg, Germany. It shelters and trains children, the mentally handicapped and disturbed, and cares for the aged. It also trains people for social service careers.

== History ==
Rauhes Haus was founded at Horn (now a suburb of Hamburg) by the 25-year-old theologian Johann Hinrich Wichern on 12 September 1833 who for a long time was head administrator at the institution. The name of the institution is a corruption of Ruges Haus as the institution started in an old house called by its former occupant Ruges Hus (i.e. Ruge's house), which by a mistranslation into high German became “Rauhes Haus”, i.e. rough house. It was connected with the German Home Mission (or Inner Mission), and started as an industrial institution for poor boys. The scope of the school widened with its growth, and in the early 20th century, besides forming a refuge for neglected children, it received boarding pupils from the higher income families and served as a training school for those wishing to become teachers, superintendents or assistants in hospitals, reformatories, houses of correction and the like. It was supported by voluntary contributions, profits arising from the productive enterprises it carried on, and fees from the richer pupils.

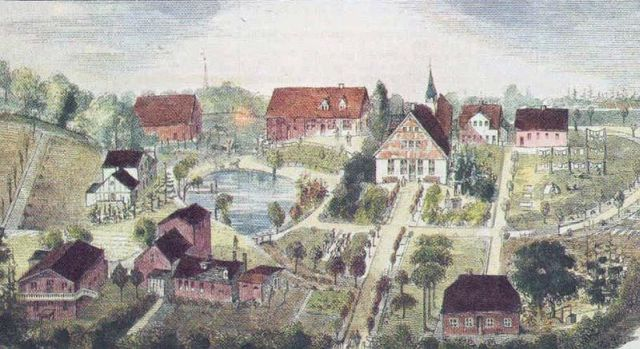
Rauhes Haus around 1850

By the early 20th century, there was an average of 100 poor and neglected children, about one-third girls, receiving instruction within its walls. They lived in “families” of from 12 to 15, each “family” being under the care of one of the adult members of the mission training school. The family group model influenced later establishments such as the agricultural colony for delinquent boys at Mettray. It was also adopted in the United Kingdom by a number of poor law authorities and children's charities who set up cottage homes developments to house the children in their care.

The educational department was in the hands of assistants, who also took part in the instruction of the institution, in order to prepare themselves for the work of the Home Mission in other localities. This indeed became one of the most important features of the work carried on by the Rauhes Haus, and its graduates were found in every field of charitable work in Germany. The whole staff of assistants consisted of young men of 20 to 29 years of age who were formed into a kind of society (Brüderschaft).

After 1844, the institution carried on a printing and book-binding business. Its newsletter was called the Fliegende Blätter.

== Today ==
Today, this basic mission continues with broader criteria for its clientele. The house is owned by the foundation Stiftung Das Rauhe Haus of the German Diakonisches Werk, the charitable work organization of many Protestant churches in Germany.
