= Christian Social Party (Germany) =

Christian Social Party Christlich–soziale Partei
- Founded: 5 January 1878; 148 years ago
- Dissolved: November 1918; 107 years ago
- Succeeded by: German National People's Party
- Ideology: Christian ethics Monarchism; Antisemitism; Paternalistic conservatism Political Protestantism
- Political position: Right-wing
- National affiliation: Economic Union

The Christian Social Party (German: Christlich–soziale Partei, CSP) was a right-wing political party in the German Empire founded in 1878 by Adolf Stoecker as the Christian Social Workers' Party (German: Christlichsoziale Arbeiterpartei, CSPA).

The party combined a strong Christian-right programme with progressive ideas on labour and tried to provide an alternative for disillusioned Social Democrat voters.

Part of the Berlin movement, it increasingly focused on the Jewish question with a distinct antisemitic attitude.

== History ==
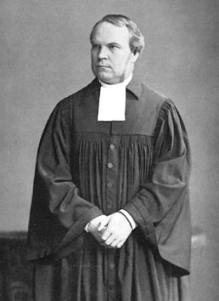
Adolf Stoecker, c. 1880/1890

In December 1877, Adolf Stoecker, domestic chaplain at the court of Emperor Wilhelm I and board member of the Evangelical Church of the Prussian Union, together with the economist Adolph Wagner had founded the Central Association for Social Reform (Zentralverein für Sozialreform), dealing with injustice and poverty after the Industrial Revolution. The organization was meant to counter the rise of the presumably revolutionary Social Democratic Party and to answer the urging social question on the basis of Protestant religion and monarchism. It was constituted as a laborers' party on 1 February 1878. The program of the CSP included:

- Founding of mandatory specialized cooperatives
- Settlement of the apprenticeship system
- Commercial arbitration
- Social insurance: mandatory widows and orphans, disability and pension funds
- Eight-hour day
- Factory Acts
- Restoring laws against usury
- Progressive income and inheritance taxes

In turn, Social Democrats like Johann Most led a large conjugation in protesting against the party and its Christianity while the reformist approach repelled social conservative voters. In the 1878 elections, the party obtained less than 1% of the vote, thereby failing to enter the German Reichstag parliament.

Upon their defeat, the CSP gave up its stance as a workers' party and concentrated on petit-bourgeois sections of the electorate. Although antisemitism was only a minor theme in the early stages of the party, the antisemitic message was carried by the so-called Berlin movement (Berliner Bewegung) of the 1880s, which gathered considerable support. The party linked criticism of capitalism with hatred toward Jews, denoting both big business and social liberal or socialist movements as Judaized and fulfilling the plans of the world Jewry to exterminate the German people (which according to the CSP did not include Jews).

The party never gained mass support, but Stoecker from 1879 onwards was able to obtain a seat in the Reichstag after an electoral coalition with the German Conservative Party (DKP). In the parliament, he acted as a DKP far-right, advocating the abolition of universal suffrage and intriguing against the policies of Chancellor Otto von Bismarck until his resignation in 1890. Stoecker was even able to include some antisemitic remarks in the DKP's 1892 party manifesto, but when the Conservatives became worried with the over-tones in his messages (although they were more targeted at Reform Judaism than orthodox Judaism) the Christian Socials were forced from the coalition in 1896 and approached to the antisemitic German Social Party. In turn, a left-wing group around Friedrich Naumann split off to found the National-Social Association.

The final demise of the Christian Social Party came in the early 1900s. Stoecker died in 1909 and in November 1918 most members of the CSP under lead of Reichstag member Reinhard Mumm (who succeeded Stoecker in representing the Arnsberg constituency) stepped over to the German National People's Party (Deutschnationale Volkspartei, DNVP) in 1918. The group separated itself again, emerging as the Christian Social People's Service (Christlich-Soziale Volksdienst) in 1929 after the business magnate Alfred Hugenberg had become DNVP chairman.

== Notable members ==
- Adolf Stoecker
- Friedrich Naumann
- Hellmut von Gerlach
