= Wagner's law =

Economic theory by Adolph Wagner

Wagner's law, also known as the law of increasing (Note: Wagner wrote in his native German, so the name of the law, Gesetz der wachsenden Staatsausgaben, is variably translated as the "law of increasing state activity" and the "law of expanding state activity".) state activity, is the observation that public expenditure increases as national income rises. It is named after the German economist Adolph Wagner (1835–1917), who first observed the effect in his own country and then for other countries.

== Industrialization ==
The principle is closely tied to industrialization. It predicts that the development of an industrial economy will be accompanied by an increased share of public expenditure in gross national product:

The advent of modern industrial society will result in increasing political pressure for social progress and increased allowance for social consideration by industry.

== Welfare states ==
Wagner's law suggests that welfare states evolves from free-market capitalism because the population votes for ever-increasing social services as income grows. In spite of some ambiguity, Wagner's statement in formal terms has been interpreted by Richard Musgrave as follows:

As progressive nations industrialize, the share of the public sector in the national economy grows continually. The increase in State Expenditure is needed because of three main reasons. Wagner himself identified these as (i) social activities of the state, (ii) administrative and protective actions, and (iii) welfare functions. The material below is an apparently much more generous interpretation of Wagner's original premise.

- Socio-political, i.e., the state social functions expand over time: retirement insurance, natural disaster aid (either internal or external), environmental protection programs, etc.
- Economic: science and technology advance, consequently there is an increase of state assignments into the sciences, technology and various investment projects, etc.
- physical: the state resorts to government loans for covering contingencies, and thus the sum of government debt and interest amount grow; i.e., it is an increase in debt service expenditure.

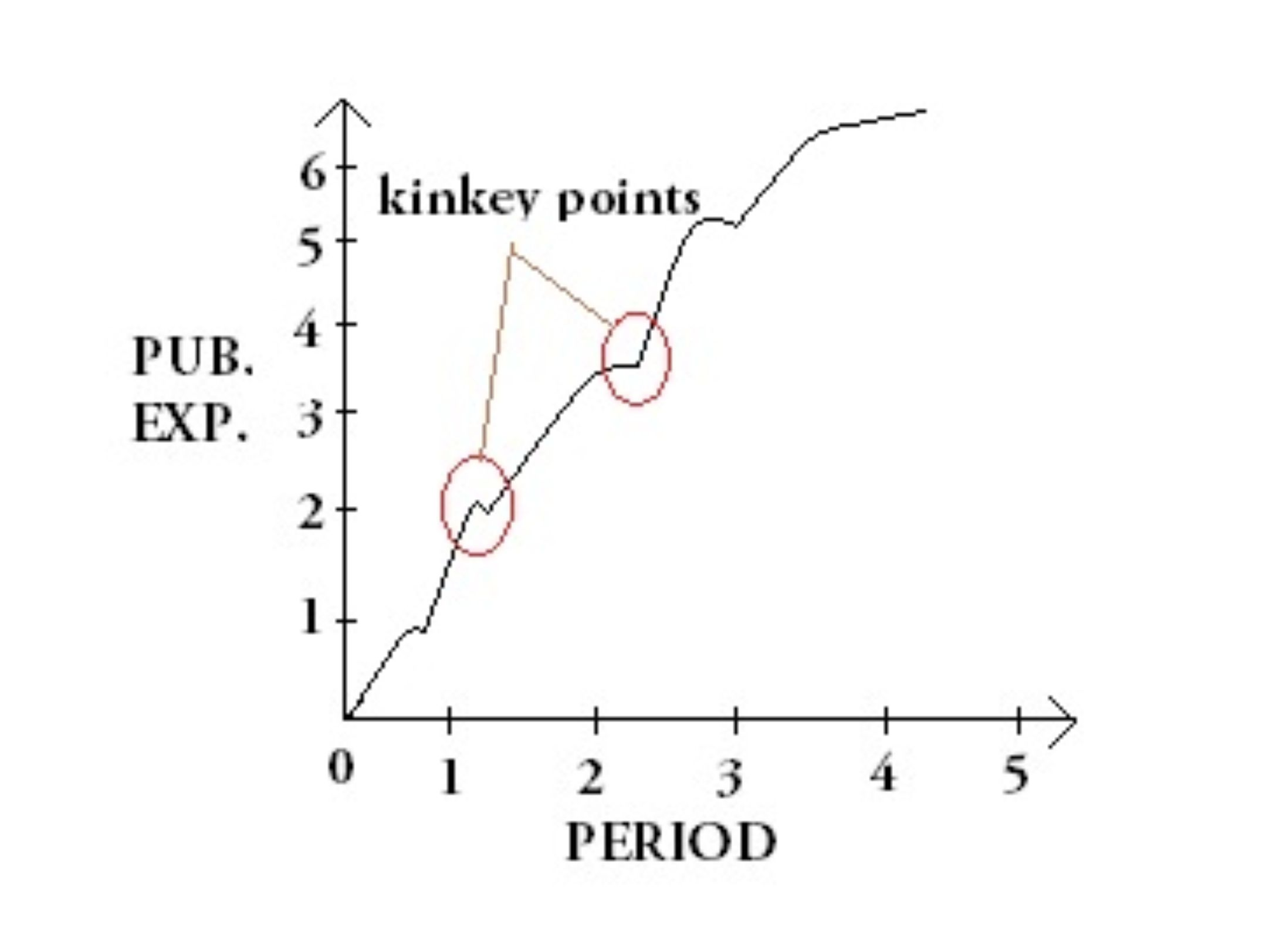
Graph showing kink in increasing public expenditure in the "Peacock–Wiseman hypothesis".

== Empirical evidence ==
Evidence for Wagner's law has been mixed.

A 1961 study by the British economists Alan T. Peacock and Jack Wiseman found that Wagner's law aptly described public expenditure in the United Kingdom in the period between 1891 and 1955. They further stated:

- There has been a considerable increase in revenue to the governments due to the economic developments over the years, thereby leading to a boost in public expenditure;
- The government simply cannot ignore the demands that people make regarding various services, especially when there is an increase in revenue collection at a constant rate of taxation;
- During times of war, tax rates are increased by the government to generate more funds to meet the increase in defense expenditure. This is known as the displacement effect. Such "displacement effect" is created when the earlier lower tax and expenditure levels are displaced by new and higher budgetary levels. But it remains the same even after the war as people get used to them. Therefore, the increase in revenue results in a rise in government expenditure.

Other studies have likewise found a strong relationship between public expenditure and per-capita gross domestic product. Studies have tended to show support for Wagner's law in developing countries, though some have found only weak support.

There have been a variety of studies testing Wagner's law in individual countries:

- South Africa: "Wagner's law finds no support in South Africa."
- Turkey: "The results of this study do not support the empirical validity of Wagner's law for Turkey for the period 1960-2000."
- Nigeria: "There exists no long-run relationship between government expenditure and output in Nigeria."
- Taiwan: "There exists no long-run relationship between government expenditures and output in...Taiwan."
- China: "There exists no long-run relationship between government expenditures and output in China."
- New Zealand: Study finds "support for Wagner's Law" in New Zealand.
- Greece and Portugal: Study finds mixed evidence.
- India: Study finds "strong evidence of Wagner's law" in India.
- Sri Lanka: "The long-run results showed no strong evidence in support of the validity of the Wagner's law for Sri Lankan economy."
- Iraq: "There is some evidence for the existence of Wagner's Law when income and several forms of expenditure are denoted in nominal terms. When expenditure in real terms is examined the chain of causality runs in the opposite direction."
