= Rudolph Sohm =

German legal scholar

Dr. Rudolf Sohm

Gotthold Julius Rudolph Sohm (29 October 1841 in Rostock – 16 May 1917 in Leipzig) was a German jurist and Church historian as well as a theologian. He published works concerning Roman and German law, Canon law and Church History.

== Biography ==
A Lutheran, Sohm studied Law in Rostock, Berlin, Heidelberg and Munich between 1860 and 1864. His doctoral dissertation in 1864 at the University of Rostock was on Roman Law; he then worked on German legal history and devoted himself to ecclesiastical law. He lectured in German Law and Commercial Law at the University of Göttingen from 1866 to 1870, before being appointed professor at that university in 1870. He was professor in Canon Law and German Law at the University of Freiburg 1870 to 1872, and at the University of Strasbourg from 1872 to 1887, and was appointed Rector in 1882. From 1887 until his death in 1917 he was professor of Canon Law and German Law in the Faculty of Law at the University of Leipzig.

In 1892 he published the first volume of his great work Kirchenrecht (Canon Law). The second volume was published posthumously in 1923. In this work Sohm argued that the Early Church had no legal constitution. He stated that "ecclesiastical law stands in contradiction to the nature of Ecclesia." The Early Church, he argued, was ruled not by legal concepts but by a power he called "charisma" (from the Greek 'charis'), which is "a gift of grace" bestowed by the Holy Spirit. In his work Sohm explored how the charismatically based Jesus movement of the Early Church changed into the legalistic bureaucracy of Roman Catholicism. The sociologist Max Weber derived his concept 'charismatic authority' from Sohm's 'charismatic organization,' a term Sohm had coined in Kirchenrecht to describe the social organization of primitive Christianity.

Kirchenrecht was immediately recognized in Germany as an epoch-making work. It also stimulated a debate between Sohm and leading theologians and religion scholars which lasted more than twenty years and stimulated a rich polemical literature.

Sohm was one of the committee of 22 members, comprising not only jurists but also representatives of financial interests and of the various ideological currents of the time, who compiled a second draft of the Bürgerliches Gesetzbuch (German Civil Code) which was accepted by the Reichstag in 1896. Also in 1896, with Friedrich Naumann and Caspar René Gregory, he founded the National-Social Association (National-Sozial Partei), based on Socialist Christianity. The party failed in the elections of 1898 and 1903 and was then dissolved into the Freeminded Union.

He was a Member of the Royal Academies for Science and the Arts of Belgium in Brussels, was a Corresponding Member of the Bavarian Academy of Sciences and Humanities in Munich between 1875 and 1917, and a member of the Philology and History class of the Royal Saxon Society of Sciences in Leipzig from 1892 to 1917. In 1914 the book Festgabe für Rudolph Sohm, dargebracht zum goldenen Doktorjubiläum von Freunden was published in celebration of the fiftieth anniversary of Sohm receiving his doctorate.

Sohm was awarded the Pour le Mérite (civil class) in 1916. One of his students was Walter Simons.

Rudolph Sohm died in Leipzig in 1917 aged 75.

== Selected publications ==
- Das Verhältniss von Staat und Kirche, aus dem Begriff von Staat und Kirche entwickelt, Tübingen, (1873)
- Institutionen des Römischen Rechts, Leipzig, (1884)
- Die Deutsche Genossenschaft, Academia Lipsiensis - Juristische Fakultaet, Leipzig, (1888)
- Kirchenrecht, München & Leipzig 2 vols. (1892) and (1923)
- Kirchengeschichte im Grundriss, E. Ungleich, Leipzig, (1894)
  - Outlines of Church History, Boston, Beacon Press, (1958)
- Institutionen ... Elfte neu durchgearbeitete Auflage, Leipzig, (1903)
- Wesen und Ursprung des Katholizismus, (1909)
- Die altdeutsche Reichs- und Gerichtsverfassung, Leipzig, (1911)
- Weltliches und geistliches Recht, Academia Lipsiensis - Juristische Fakultaet, Leipzig, (1914)

== Bibliography ==
- Adams, James Luther. "Rudolf Sohm's Theology of Law and the Spirit." In Religion and Culture: Essays in Honor of Paul Tillich, edited by Walter Leibrecht, pp. 219–235. New York, 1959.
- Haley, Peter. "Rudolf Sohm on Charisma." In Journal of Religion, 60 (1980): 185–197.
- Köhler, Wiebke. Rezeption in der Kirche: begriffsgeschichtliche Studien bei Sohm, Afanas'ev, Dombois und Congar. Göttingen, Vandenhoeck & Ruprecht, 1998.
- Lease, Gary "Odd Fellows" in the Politics of Religion - Modernism, National Socialism and German Judaism - 'A Protestant "Modernist"? A reevaluation of Rudolph Sohm' Google Books (pg 44)
- Lowrie, Walter. The Church and its Organization in Primitive and Catholic Times, An Interpretation of Rudolph Sohm's Kirchenrecht Longmans, Green, and Co. 1904.
