= Johannes Lauritzen =

Lutheran

- Born: Johannes Rudolph Lauritzen; February 21, 1845; Bohemia, Germany
- Died: September 26, 1923 (aged 78); Knoxville, Tennessee
- Education: Practical Seminary, St. Louis, Missouri
- Occupations: Pastor, Bible translator
- Religion: Lutheran
- Ordained: 1872

Johannes Rudolph Lauritzen (February 21, 1845 – September 26, 1923) was a German-American Lutheran clergyman.

== Biography ==
Johannes Lauritzen was born in Bohemia, Germany on February 21, 1845. He emigrated to the United States in 1870, and became a Lutheran pastor, jail chaplain, minister to the poor, and Bible translator. He received his seminary training at the Practical Seminary of the Lutheran Church–Missouri Synod, located at that time in St. Louis. He graduated in 1872, and was ordained and called to St. John's Lutheran Church in New London, Wisconsin. He married Louise Sophia Von-Unold in 1874.

In 1875, he became pastor of Trinity Lutheran Church in Port Huron, Michigan. In 1880, however, he was suspended by the LCMS, perhaps due to his involvement in activities outside the parish such as rescue mission, jail ministry, and Bible distribution.

He later moved to Knoxville, Tennessee to become pastor of First Lutheran Church, starting in 1887. Because of his great involvement in fighting drunkenness and in establishing a rescue mission for indigents, he had to resign from the church. He then became the pastor at St. Peter's Evangelical Church, also in Knoxville, where he worked until his pastoral retirement. Among other social ministries, he worked with poor children of Knoxville, including tutoring them in school subjects. He also spent much of his time for 35 years working with prisoners in the jail. He was accompanied in this work by his wife Louise, and they organized the Mission Children's Home together in 1889. After her death in 1912, he remarried to Pearl Anna Wallace on March 14, 1915.

It appears that his close contact with the uneducated and unchurched led him to begin a translation of the New Testament. His translation of the New Testament into English was published in Knoxville in 1917, the 400th anniversary of the start of the Lutheran Reformation. The translation did not differ significantly from the King James Version. A committee of other Lutheran pastors revised his work and published The Capitalized and Revised American Lutheran Translation New Testament and Psalms in 1920.

In two years, the Lutheran Bible Society of Knoxville had distributed 7,500 copies of this New Testament. A further thousand were sent to English prisoners during World War I and others were sent to US soldiers. Nonetheless, copies of this translation are relatively rare and Lauritzen is barely remembered for his Bible translation work.

Johannes Lauritzen died in Knoxville on September 26, 1923.
