= Inner mission =

Evangelical Christian movement seeking a rebirth of Christianity

The Inner Mission (German: Innere Mission, also translated as Home Mission) was and is a movement of German evangelists, set up by Johann Hinrich Wichern in Wittenberg in 1848 based on a model of Theodor Fliedner. It quickly spread from Germany to other countries.

Like other missions, the Inner Mission sought a "rebirth" of Christianity, by means of the doctrine of "brotherly love" and a social programme of charity (social service) and Christian education.

An inner mission or rescue mission is a project set up by Christian groups to aid the poor and sick in the home country of the group. The word inner reflects that mission is within a single country's boundaries – generally a "mission" is presumed to be overseas.

== Specific inner missions ==
The City Mission movement, with the London City Mission and the New York City Rescue Mission and the Wesley Mission in Australia are examples.

Having grown up in Germany, birthplace of the movement, Rev. Johannes Lauritzen served Lutheran churches in Knoxville, Tennessee and established a rescue mission there about 1890. His congregational work and his work with the poor and imprisoned led him to produce a translation of the New Testament that was aimed at people with less education and exposure to Biblical concepts.

The Danish version was, for a time, run by Vilhelm Beck.

== See also ==
- The Church Association for the Inner Mission in Denmark
