= Caroline Wichern =

German music educator and composer

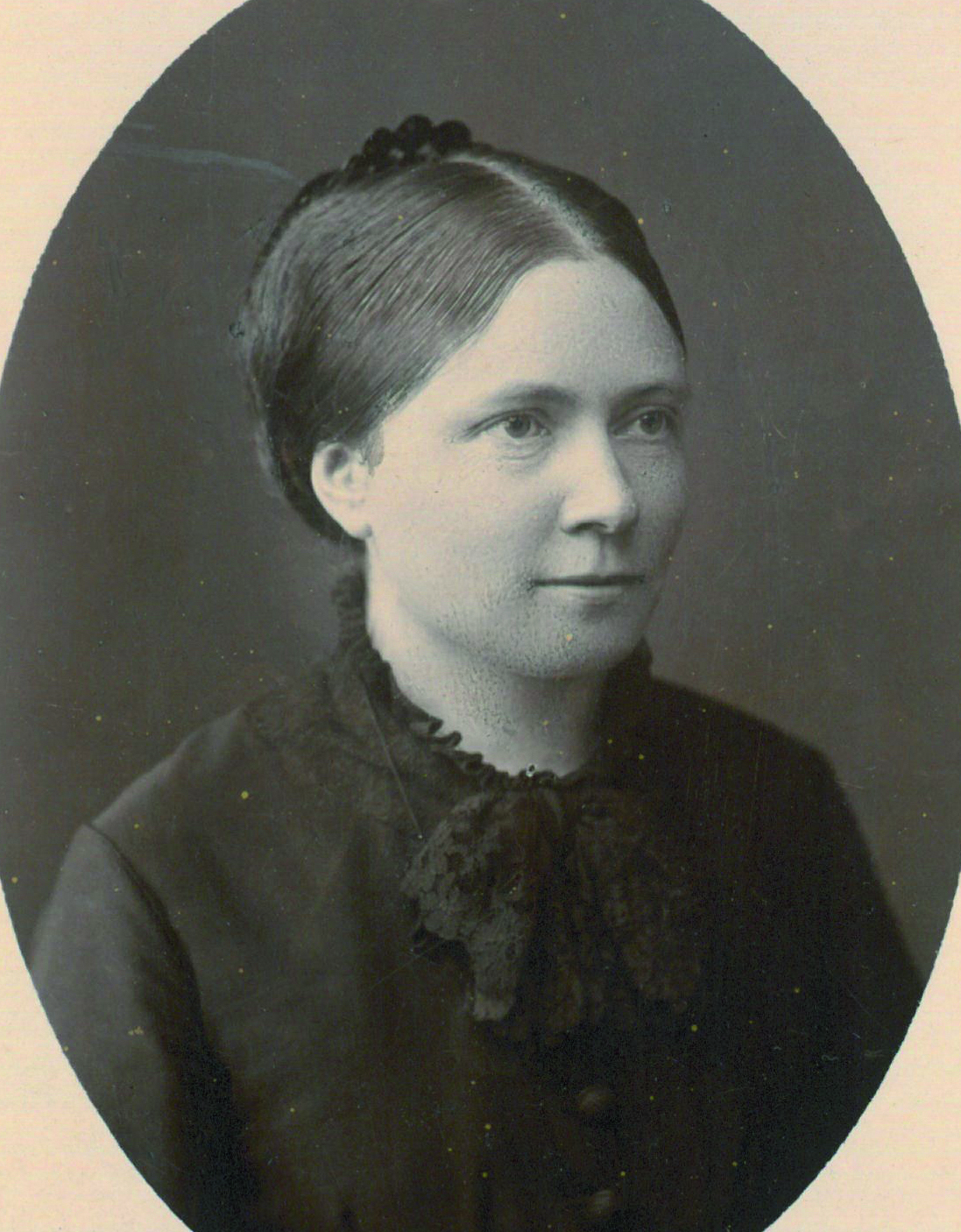
Caroline Wichern

Caroline Wichern (12 September 1836 – 7 May 1906) was a German music educator and composer.

== Biography ==
Caroline Wichern was the eldest daughter of the Protestant theologian and social reformer Johann Hinrich Wichern. She wrote and published songs including a collection of Christmas songs, and was associated with Johannes Brahms. She worked until 1895 as a music teacher at Ellerslie College in Manchester, a school for kindergarten teachers. She was instrumental in popularizing the Christmas song "Stille Nacht" in England.
