= Evangelical Social Congress =

The Evangelical Social Congress (German: Evangelisch-Sozialer Kongress, ESK) was a social-reform movement of German evangelists founded in Whitsuntide in 1890.

Various groups were united in the Congress, although, in the end, the Congress failed to set forth a united programme of "Christian socialism" (more so because people like Friedrich Naumann and Adolf Stoecker would depart from the Congress).

The Congress never carried a large membership, and was only marginal compared to the Verein für Socialpolitik, an organization that currently still exists.

== Associated people ==
- Otto Baumgarten
- Paul Gohre
- Adolf von Harnack (longtime president of the Congress)
- Friedrich Naumann
- Martin Rade
- Paul Rohrbach
- Gerhart von Schulze-Gävernitz
- Walter Simons
- Adolf Stoecker
- Max Weber
