= Reichsgau Steiermark =

Reichsgau Styria
- Reichsgau of Nazi Germany
- 1938–1945
- Flag Coat of arms

- Map of Nazi Germany showing its administrative subdivisions (Gaue and Reichsgaue)
- Capital: Graz
- Population
  - 1938: 1,116,539
- Government
- Gauleiter
  - 1938–1945: Siegfried Uiberreither
- History
  - Anschluss: 12 March 1938
  - German surrender: 8 May 1945
Preceded by
Styria
Burgenland
Drava Banovina
Succeeded by
Styria
Burgenland
Socialist Republic of Slovenia
- Today part of: Austria Slovenia

The Reichsgau Styria (German: Reichsgau Steiermark) was an administrative division of Nazi Germany consisting of areas in Styria, Lower Styria and southern parts of Burgenland. It existed from 1938 to 1945.

== History ==
The Nazi Gau (plural Gaue) system was originally established in a party conference on 22 May 1926, in order to improve administration of the party structure. From 1933 onwards, after the Nazi seizure of power, the Gaue increasingly replaced the German states as administrative subdivisions in Germany. On 12 March 1938, Nazi Germany annexed Austria and on, 24 May, the Austrian provinces were reorganized and replaced by seven Nazi party Gaue. Under the Ostmarkgesetz law of 14 April 1939 with effect of 1 May, the Austrian Gaue were raised to the status of Reichsgaue and their Gauleiter were subsequently also named Reichsstatthalter.

At the head of each Gau stood a Gauleiter, a position which became increasingly more powerful, especially after the outbreak of the Second World War. Local Gauleiter were in charge of propaganda and surveillance and, from September 1944 onwards, the Volkssturm and the defence of the Gau.

The position of Gauleiter in Styria was held by Siegfried Uiberreither throughout the Reichsgau's history from 1938 to 1945.
