= Johann Hinrich Wichern =

German theologian and social worker

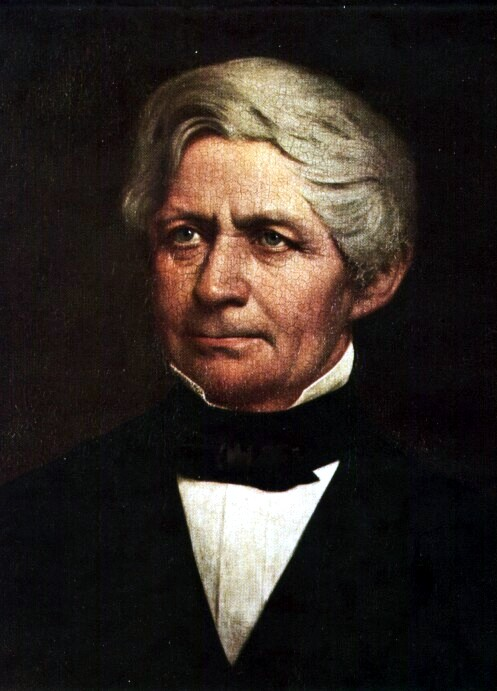

Johann Hinrich Wichern (21 April 1808 – 7 April 1881) was a founder of the Home Mission (also translated as Inner Mission; German: Innere Mission) movement in Germany.

== Biography ==
Wichern was born in Hamburg into a family of poverty, together with seven siblings. He became headteacher of a Sunday school in St. Georg, Hamburg which proved very successful, and in 1833 opened his Rauhes Haus at Horn, Hamburg. Wichern became especially known for recruiting and training a corps of "brothers" who helped educate and discipline wayward boys and men and tend to the needs of the poor. He founded hostels across Germany that were supposed to provide a refuge, free of alcohol and gambling, to journeymen and other travellers. In his writings and speeches, Wichern promoted the ideal of Christian voluntarism to assist the poor, criminals, and disabled and heal the class and political divides in Germany surrounding the Revolution of 1848 (which he loathed). He is also credited with inventing the (now traditional) Advent wreath in 1839. In 1844, he founded a monthly periodical, Fliegende Blätter des Rauhen Hauses, which he edited.

Through his exertions, the Protestant synod at Wittenberg in 1848 appointed a central committee for home missions. In 1851 the Prussian government made him inspector of prisons and houses of correction, and in 1858 member of the Supreme Ecclesiastical Council, the executive authority of the Evangelical State Church in Prussia. In 1872 disease forced him to retire from office. Following a long illness and several strokes, Wichern died in 1881 in Hamburg.

Among his nine children, his daughter Caroline Wichern (1836–1906) was a composer and music educator in Germany and England; his son Johannes Wichern (1845–1914) followed in his father's footsteps. Several churches, schools, and assisted-living facilities (Wichernhaus), church ships and streets in Germany are named after Johann Hinrich Wichern. He was honoured on two postage stamps and he is commemorated in the Lutheran calendar of names on 7 April.

== Writings ==
- Die innere Mission der deutschen evangelischen Kirche [The inner mission of the German Evangelical Church], 1849
- Die Behandlung der Verbrecher und entlassenen Sträflinge [The handling of criminals and the discharge of prisoners], 1853
- Festbüchlein des Rauhen Hauses (3 vols.), 1856
- Der Dienst der Frauen in der Kirche [Women's service in the church], 1858
- Unsere Lieder [Our songs], 4th ed., 1870
