= Berlin movement =

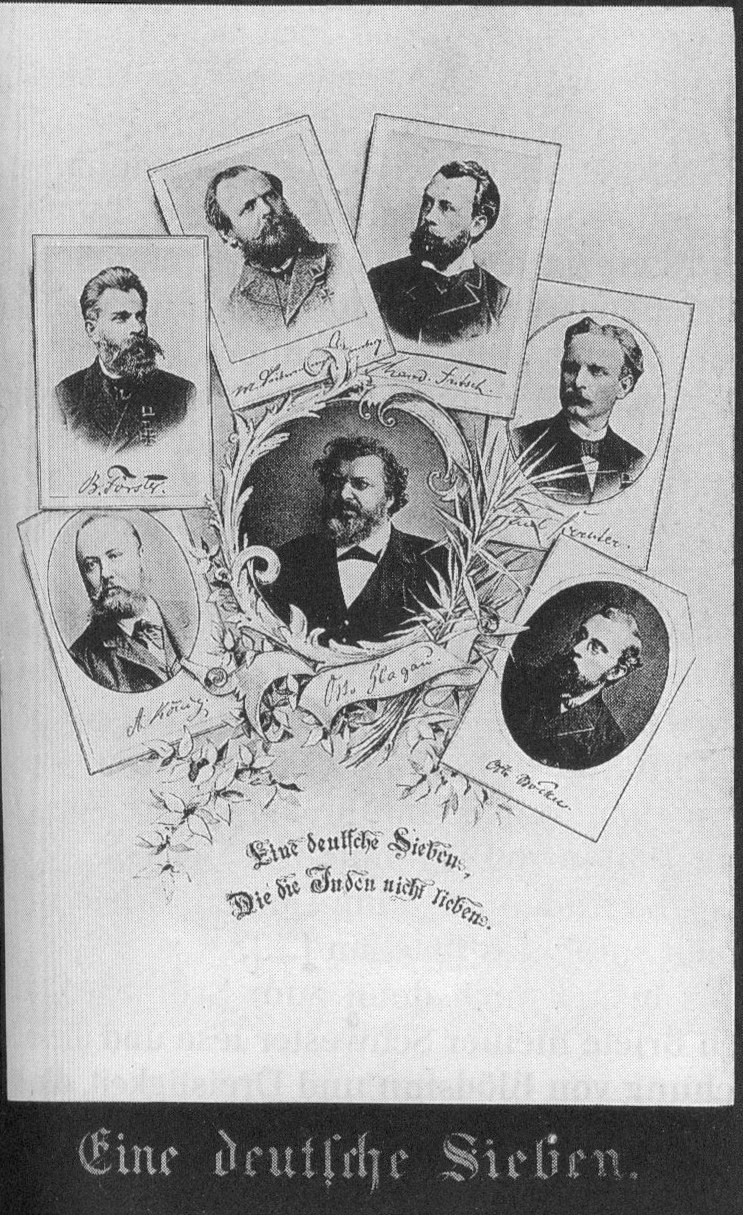
- "A German Seven". Montage of portraits showing well-known German antisemites ca. at the time of the "Antisemitenpetition" (1880/1881). Centre: Otto Glagau, around him clockwise: Adolf König, Bernhard Förster, Max Liebermann von Sonnenberg, Theodor Fritsch, Paul Förster and Otto Böckel. Writing says "A German seven / those who do not love the Jews", but can also be read as "A German seven / those who the Jews do not love".
- Formation: 1880s
- Purpose: Antisemitism
- Location: German Empire
- Key people: Otto Glagau, Adolf Stoecker

The Berlin movement was an antisemitic intellectual and political movement in the German Empire in the 1880s. The movement was a collection of unassociated individuals and organizations.

== Impact of the Panic of 1873 in antisemitism and anti-capitalism ==
The movement developed in the aftermath of the Panic of 1873 that led to a recession in the United States and parts of the western European economy. It assailed Jews and capitalism; along with this critique it opposed liberalism, and it represented a fear of social democracy. Finally, the movement came out of a racial conception of national identity on the part of the German middle class.

== Lutheran leadership in the Reichstag ==
The movement had several leaders. The journalist and author Otto Glagau led a journal, Der Kulturkämpfer, [The Culture Warrior] that propagated these ideas. The Lutheran theologian and politician, Adolf Stoecker, led the Christian Social Party. He was the only elected representative of the party in the Reichstag.

== Distancing of Chancellor Otto von Bismarck from the movement ==
The movement lost strength after the CSP's losses in the 1887 elections. Additionally, the Chancellor Otto von Bismarck distanced himself from the party. The significance of the movement laid in its being the first anti-Semitic movement in modern Germany.

== See also ==
- Anti-liberalism
- Antisemitism
- German Empire
