= Margarete Heymann =

German Jewish ceramic artist

Grete Marks
- c.1925
- Born: Margarete Heymann; August 10, 1899; Cologne, Kingdom of Prussia, German Empire
- Died: November 11, 1990 (aged 91); London, United Kingdom
- Occupation: Ceramic artist
- Spouse(s): Gustav Löbenstein; Harold Marks

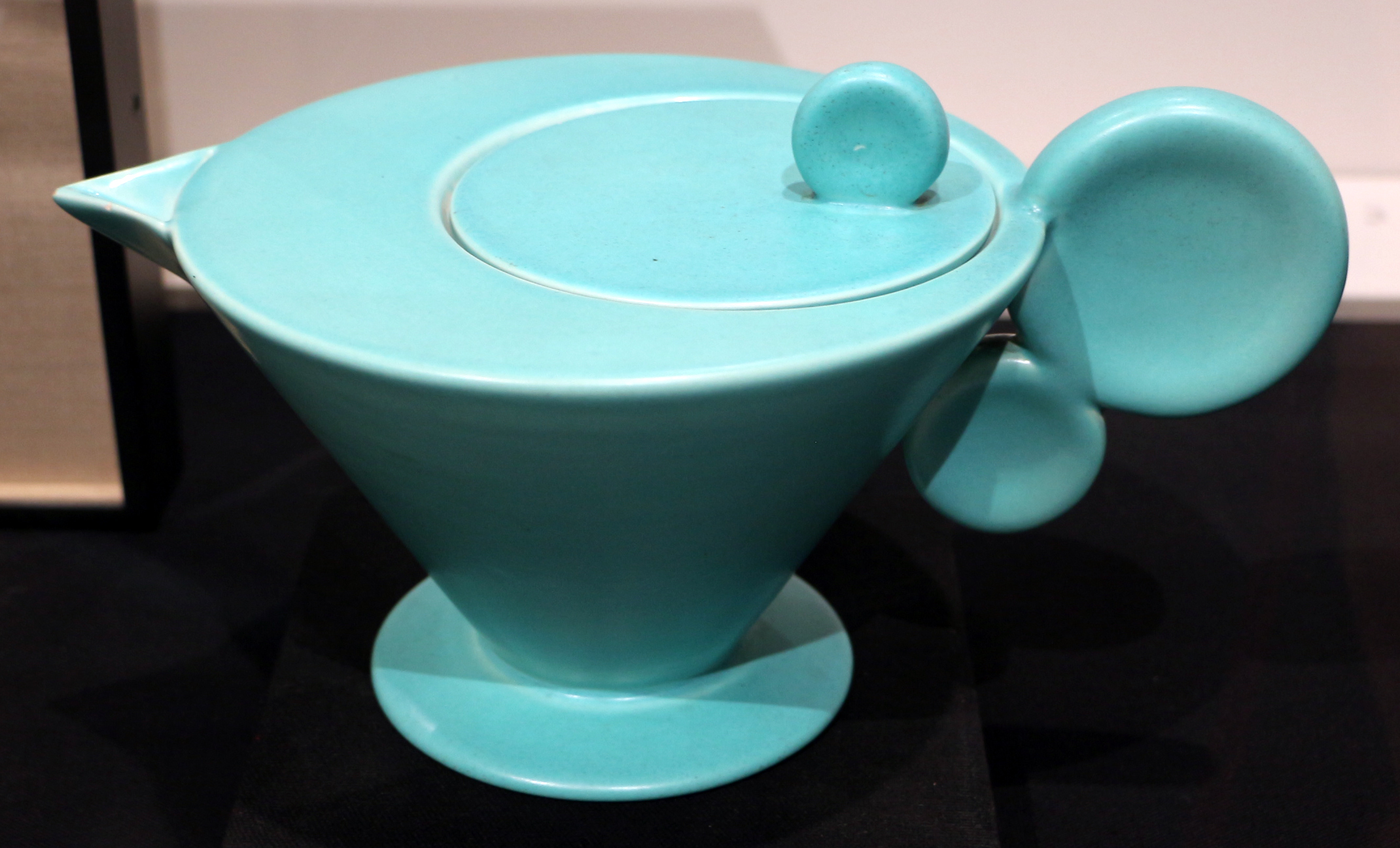
Teapot, 1930 ca.

Margarete Heymann (August 10, 1899 – 11 November 1990), also known as Margarete Heymann-Löbenstein, Margarete Heymann-Marks, and Grete Marks, was a German ceramic artist of Jewish origin and a Bauhaus student. In 1923 she founded the Haël Workshops for Artistic Ceramics at Marwitz that she had to close in 1933 and settled in Jerusalem. She moved to Britain in 1936 and continued her work, becoming world famous as “Greta Pottery”. Her finest work is considered to be from her working period in Germany.

== Early life and education ==
Heymann was born in 1899. She studied at the Cologne School of Arts and at Dusseldorf Academy before entering the Bauhaus School of Arts in Weimar in November 1920.

== Career ==
In 1923, she founded the Haël Workshops for Artistic Ceramics at Marwitz with her husband Gustav Loebenstein and his brother Daniel, where she manufactured her Modern ceramic designs. The company employed 120 people and exported its works to London and America. In August 1928, Gustav Loebenstein and his brother were killed in a car accident. Grete Heymann-Loebenstein, who was at the time the mother of two young children, continued to run the business; in 1930 she was able to put a new kiln into operation. However, the Haël Workshops, together with the porcelain and ceramics industry as a whole, suffered a severe drop in sales and recorded heavy losses, as is shown in the preserved company balance sheets for the years 1927/28-1932. The Haël Workshop's annual turnover from the sale of goods fell from 696,950 Reichsmarks (RM) in the year 1928 to 112,095 RM in 1932; net profit in 1928 amounted to 38,717 RM, in 1930 the books were still balanced, but in 1931 a loss of 24,177 RM was recorded, and in 1932 a loss of 22,283 RM. At the beginning of 1932, the Haël Workshops were forced to cut their prices by 15%. In the autumn of 1932, the Haël Workshops were represented at the Leipzig Trade Fair for the last time.

In July 1933, Heymann-Loebenstein closed the business and appointed the Berlin auditor Dr Max Silberstein as liquidator. In order to keep the jobs of the workers, the Director of the stoneware factory Vordamm (which continued to exist in the place of the Velten-Vordamm stoneware factory which had gone bankrupt in 1931) took up negotiations and, by October 1933, had arrived at a preliminary agreement for re-establishment of the company on the basis of a pro-rata share capital of 40,000 Reichsmarks. Dr Loebenstein had herself previously worked under the former Commercial Director of the stoneware factories. The two of them now wanted to attempt to re-establish the company with Mrs Loebenstein as Artistic Director with pro-rata amounts of capital. Yet she broke off the negotiations and tried instead to set up a new company in Jerusalem. By October 1933 it became clear that the project there was not making any progress and she gave up the idea in November of the same year.

Nora Herz heard of these events at an early stage and she prepared her friend Hedwig Bollhagen for Loebenstein's premature return from Palestine and the possible resumption of negotiations—in order to keep the jobs, for herself and for the others affected by the bankruptcy and closure. Heinrich Schild had previously given his support to the ceramicists affected by the bankruptcy in 1931. From December 1933 until April 1934, there were a series of long negotiations with Silberstein, who was now looking for a purchase figure of 60,000 RM. Yet Schild broke off negotiations on 26 January 1934. Dr Loebenstein re-initiated the negotiations and so it was that the company was re-founded as HB Workshops for Ceramics on 26 April in the former cocklestove factory in Marwitz, on the basis of a purchase contract of 45,000 RM.

Schild took on the role of Managing Director without pay and Hedwig Bollhagen became Artistic Director as an employee of the company, which was founded on 1 May 1934. Nora Herz, with her animal sculptures, was just as involved in the setting up of the company as the re-employed painters and employees of both the Velten-Vordamm stoneware factory and the Haël Workshop for Artistic Ceramics. The HB Workshops for Ceramics started production in May 1934, with the considerable use of Grete Loebenstein's designs. She received a share in the profits, constituting up to 50% of the product portfolio, which were presented at the 1934 Leipzig Trade Fair. For example, in 1934/35, the well-known service "Norma", one of Grete Loebenstein's designs from the year 1932, was produced in the HB Workshops. Right up to the 1960s, according to her own account, Hedwig Bollhagen was still manufacturing some of Grete Loebenstein’s designs.

Margarete Heymann emigrated to England in 1936, initially settling in Stoke-on-Trent. She was able to move to England because of the assistance of Heals, whose London store had previously sold her work. She was able to find work in Stoke-on-Trent but the traditional potters there failed to take advantage of her knowledge of modern design and manufacture. It was Mintons who decided after six months that her work was commercial. She continued to rent her own studios where she bought other peoples designs which she decorated.

== Personal life and death ==
Margarete Heymann was married to Gustav Loebenstein and widowed in 1928. She later married the English educator Harold Marks in London, and in Staffordshire she painted and continued to experiment with pottery made from broken shards.

== Legacy ==
In 2012 the Keramik-Museum Berlin exhibited an overview of her work for the Haël Workshops for Artistic Ceramics, which was followed by an exhibition at the Milwaukee Art Museum.

Her work was considered degenerate by the Nazis: In a May 1935 article in the National Socialist magazine Der Angriff [The Attack], the ceramics designs of Margarete Heymann were compared to the works of Hedwig Bollhagen and were described as being degenerate art and of an inferior standard. Articles such as this were targeting the continued involvement of the Jewish ceramicists Margarete Loebenstein and Nora Herz in the development of the HB Workshops.

Her lack of success as a designer has been interpreted to be the result of her "gender, geography, genre and timing" conspiring against her. Marks story and one of her vases which is now in the British Museum was chosen by Neil MacGregor as the basis of a radio programme in Germany: Memories of a Nation - a history of Germany.

In 2019 Pallant House Gallery held an exhibition of her watercolour portraits, a lesser known aspect of her creative practice.

== See also ==
- Women of the Bauhaus
