= HB-Werkstätten für Keramik =

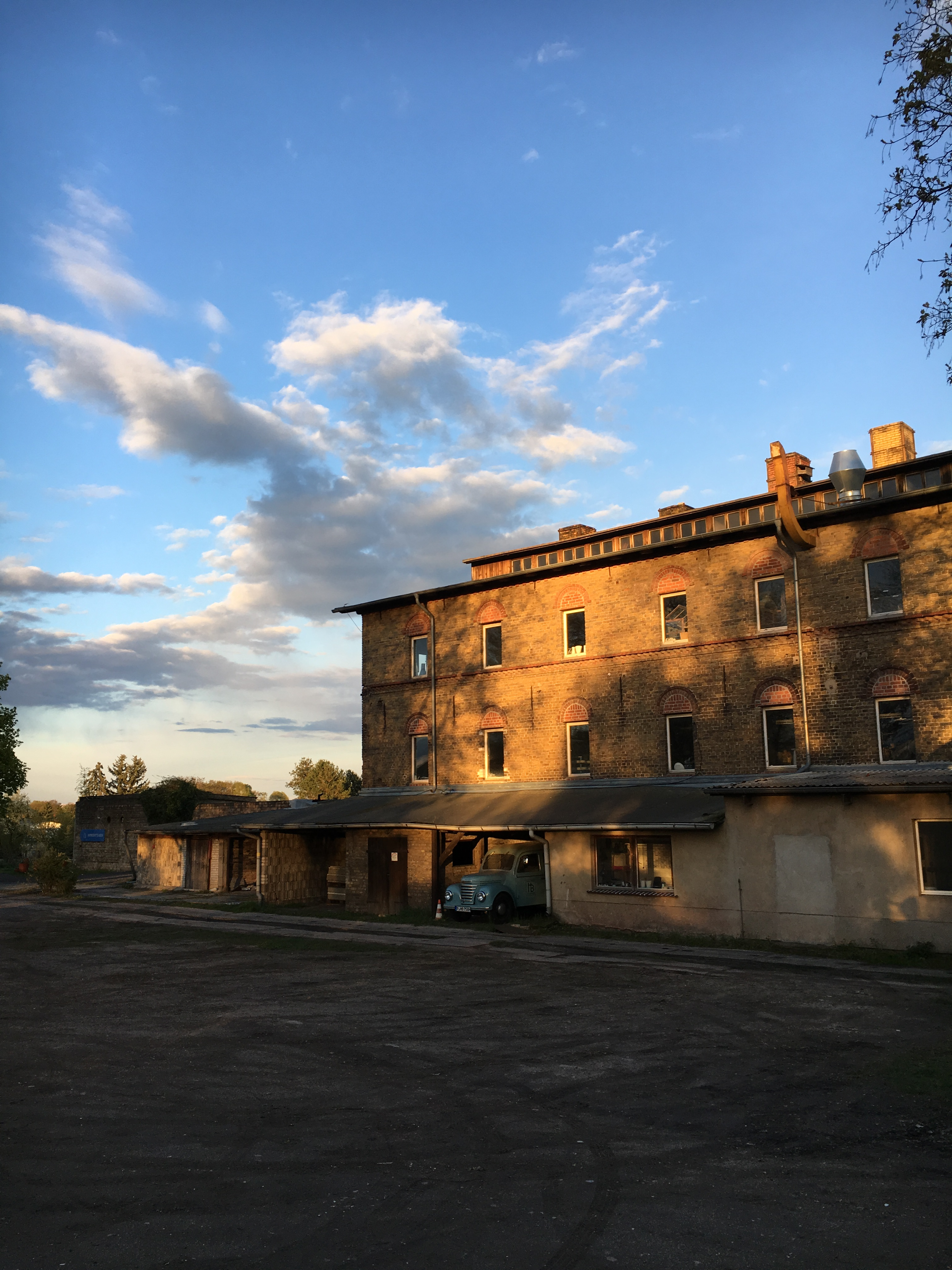
HB Werkstätten

HB-Werkstätten für Keramik GmbH (HB Workshops for Ceramics) in the Brandenburg district of Marwitz was founded by Hedwig Bollhagen (1907–2001) and Heinrich Schild (1895–1978). Hedwig Bollhagen remained artistic director until shortly before her death in 2001.

The HB Workshops produce hand-crafted tableware and sophisticated building ceramics in the former cocklestove factory in Marwitz, which is protected as a listed building. The building ceramics produced by the workshops are used in areas such as the preservation and restoration of historical monuments. Shaped bricks are produced by hand as one-off products or in short series production, in various different formats and profiles. These have been used, for example, in the Friedrichswerder Church and the Rotes Rathaus in Berlin, as well as in the Chorin Abbey and in the Sanssouci Palace in Potsdam.

== History ==
Following up a suggestion from her friend Nora Herz, Hedwig Bollhagen was able to restart production at the closed-down Haël Workshops for Artistic Ceramics, which had been founded by Margarete Heymann and Gustav Loebenstein, with the opening of the HB Workshops in 1934. The new limited company made it possible to gradually re-employ the former employees of the workshops and to introduce a new product line – HB Ceramics – by taking on the employees (including Theodor Bogler and Werner Burri) of the Velten-Vordamm stoneware factory which had closed in 1931.

As had been the case for Margarete Heymann and the two employees mentioned above, the master craftswoman ceramicist Thoma Gräfin Grote, who was a developer and commercial assistant in the company from 1934/1935 onwards, had been trained by Gerhard Marcks in the ceramics workshop of the state-run Bauhaus on the Dornburg. The painter Charles Crodel (1894–1973), who was a friend of Gerhard Marcks, gave his support to the company from 1935 onwards. He opened up the field of building ceramics and at the same time brought with him industrial experience in the development of decoration which he had gained at the United Lausitz Glassworks (Wilhelm Wagenfeld). After the war, Heinrich Schild, who was a member of the National Socialist German Workers' Party, fled to West Germany. Hedwig Bollhagen took on responsibility for running the business alone.

In 1972 the workshops were nationalised, but Hedwig Bollhagen stayed on as artistic director. In 1992, the business was finally reprivatised. After Hedwig Bollhagen's death, the artist Heidi Manthey took on the role of artistic director.

== Building ceramics ==
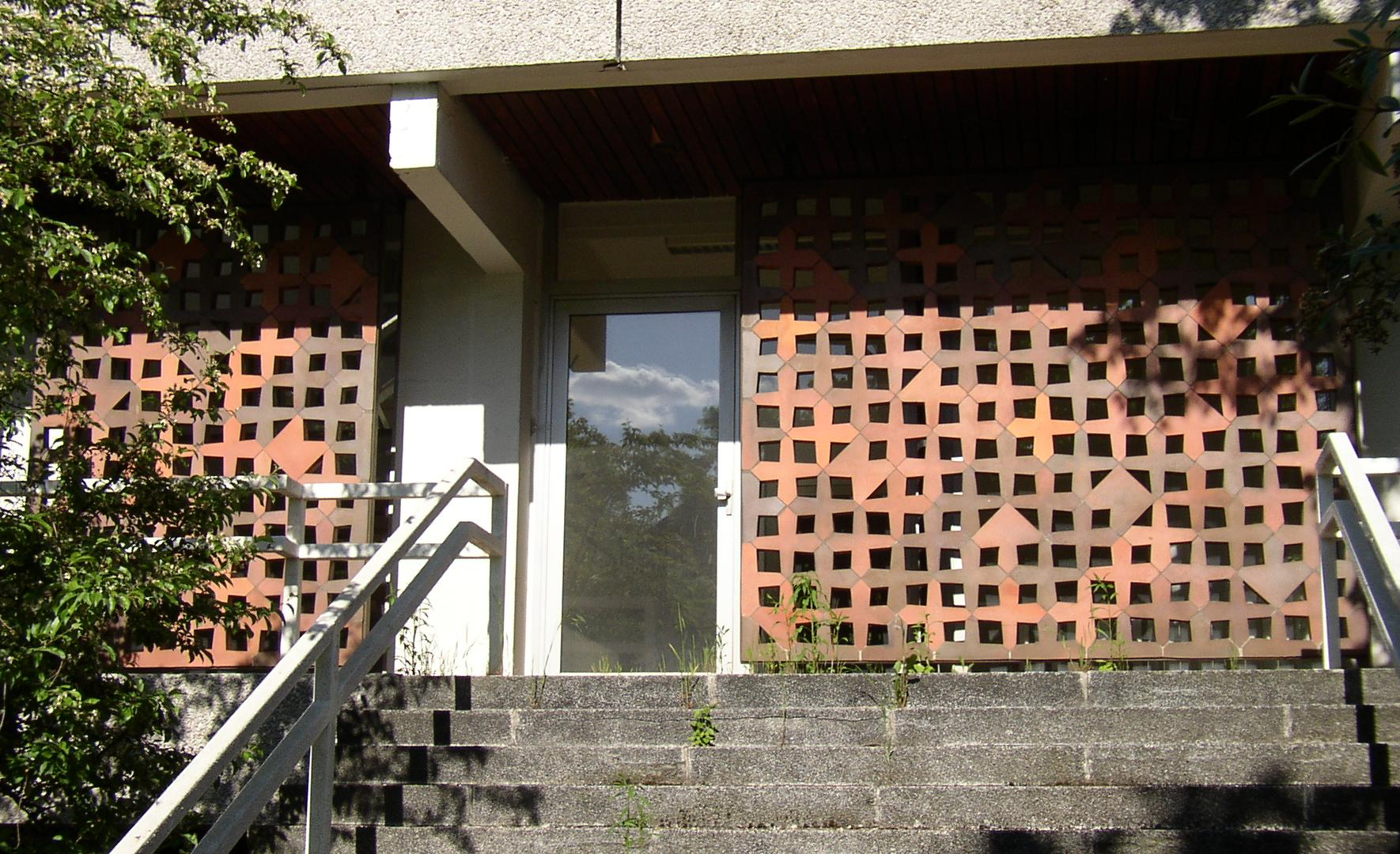
Berlin Kreuzsteine

The HB Workshops have produced building ceramics for, among others, the following buildings:

- St. Katharine's Church in Brandenburg an der Havel (around 1968)
- Protestant Church of St. Peter and Paul in Wusterhausen (1965–1967)
- Altes Schloss (Freyenstein) (‘old palace’) (1969–1973)
- Australian Embassy in Berlin-Pankow (1973/1974, structural walls made of cross-shaped bricks set in an iron framework on the facade)
- Iraqi embassy in the GDR in Berlin-Pankow (1974, clinkered exterior facade)
- Old lighthouse at Cape Arkona (1977–1988)
- Rotes Rathaus Berlin(1982–1990)
- Borsig Country Estate in Gross Behnitz (1992/1993)
- Retirement home in Radensleben Palace (1993)
- St. Mary's Church in Neubrandenburg (around 1995)
- S-Bahn station Berlin-Pankow (1997)
- Ruin of a portal Berlin Anhalter Bahnhof(2004/2005)

== Discussion of history ==
In the context of the gradual revival of production by Hedwig Bollhagen from 1934 onwards (she was at the time just 26 years old) and the re-employment of the employees of the two closed-down ceramic art factories—the Velten-Vordamm stoneware factories G.m.b.H.(1931) and the Haël Workshops for Artistic Ceramics (1933)—through the mediation of the Cologne ceramicist Nora Herz, there was some talk, in a discussion relating to the exhibition to celebrate the 100th birthday of the founder, of expropriation and Aryanisation in line with the Directive on the exclusion of the Jews from the German business economy of 12 November 1938. In terms of setting up and profiting from the HB workshops, at least two Jewish ceramicists were involved, at least up until the end of 1936, these being Margarete Heymann and Nora Herz from Cologne.

== See also ==
- History of the Ceramics Industry in Velten
- History of the Ceramics Industry in Marwitz
