= Prussian virtues =

Ethical code associated with Prussian society

Prussian virtues (German: preußische Tugenden) are the virtues associated with the historical Kingdom of Prussia (1701–1918). They were derived from Prussia's militarism and the ethical code of the Prussian Army as well as from bourgeois values such as honesty and frugality that were influenced by Lutheran Pietism and the Enlightenment. The so-called "German virtues" that include punctuality, order, and diligence can also be traced back to Prussian virtues.

== History ==
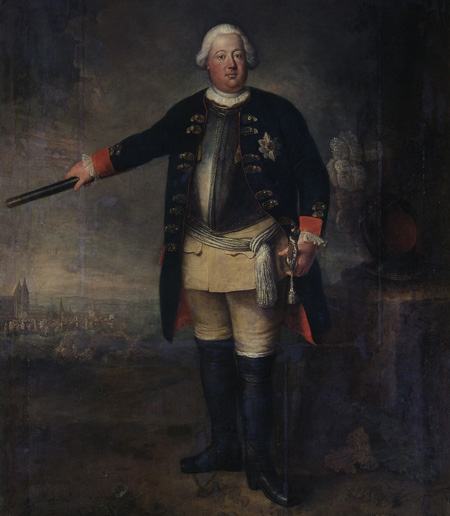
King Frederick William I of Prussia

Pietism, which emphasized individual piety and leading an active Christian life, exerted a significant influence on the Prussian court and its nobility from the time of its founding in the late seventeenth century. Although King Frederick William I (r. 1713–1740) was a Calvinist, he had considerable respect for Lutheran-based Pietism. He felt that it had a moderating influence on the tensions between Lutherans and Calvinists within both the kingdom and the court. It also brought with it practical social benefits such as the Francke Foundation, which opened charity schools and orphanages. Pietism quickly became closely intertwined with Prussian governmental bodies at all levels and among all estates. Numerous pastors and administrators educated in the spirit of Pietism at the University of Halle carried its values out into the country. It was also embraced by some of Prussia's high-ranking military officers such as Field Marshal Dubislav Gneomar von Natzmer who championed Pietist attempts to free the army of vices such as gambling and the use of brothels.

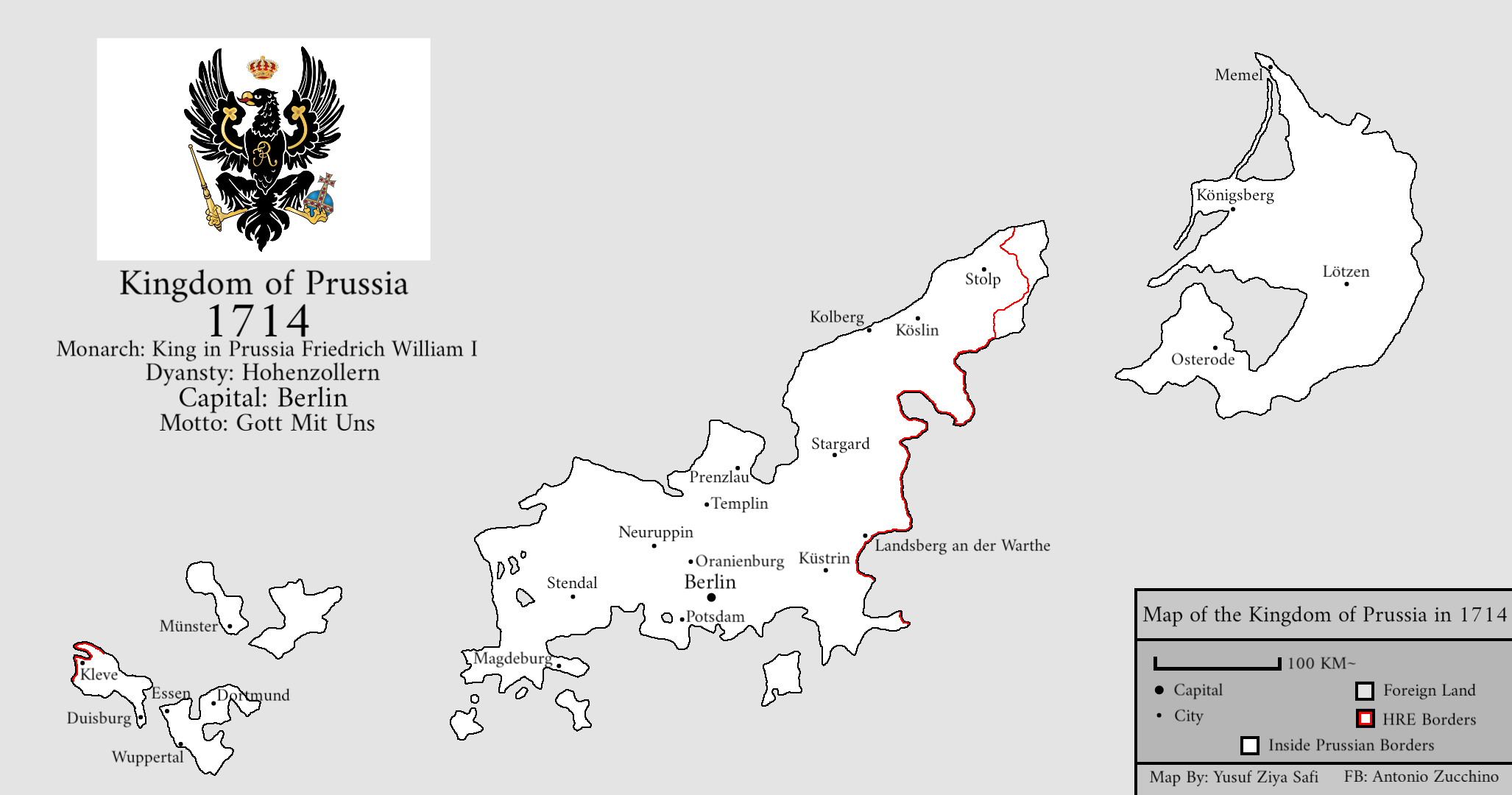
Kingdom of Prussia in 1714

At that time, Prussian territory was spread over wide areas, some of them far apart, and its population was heterogeneous. The majority of Prussians were Lutherans, a minority (including parts of the ruling family) Calvinists, and another minority Catholics. After King Frederick the Great (r. 1740–1786) brought Jews into the country, a total of four larger religious communities existed in the state, along with several smaller free churches. Ethnically, in addition to the German majority, there were Slavic (Polish, Sorbian, and Kashubian) and Baltic (Prussian Lithuanians and Curonians) minorities, and a significant minority of the population, especially in Berlin, consisted of descendants of French Huguenots. In such a heterogeneous state, the ideas of Pietism, which eventually took on the character of a "Prussian state religion", proved to be a valuable area of commonality.

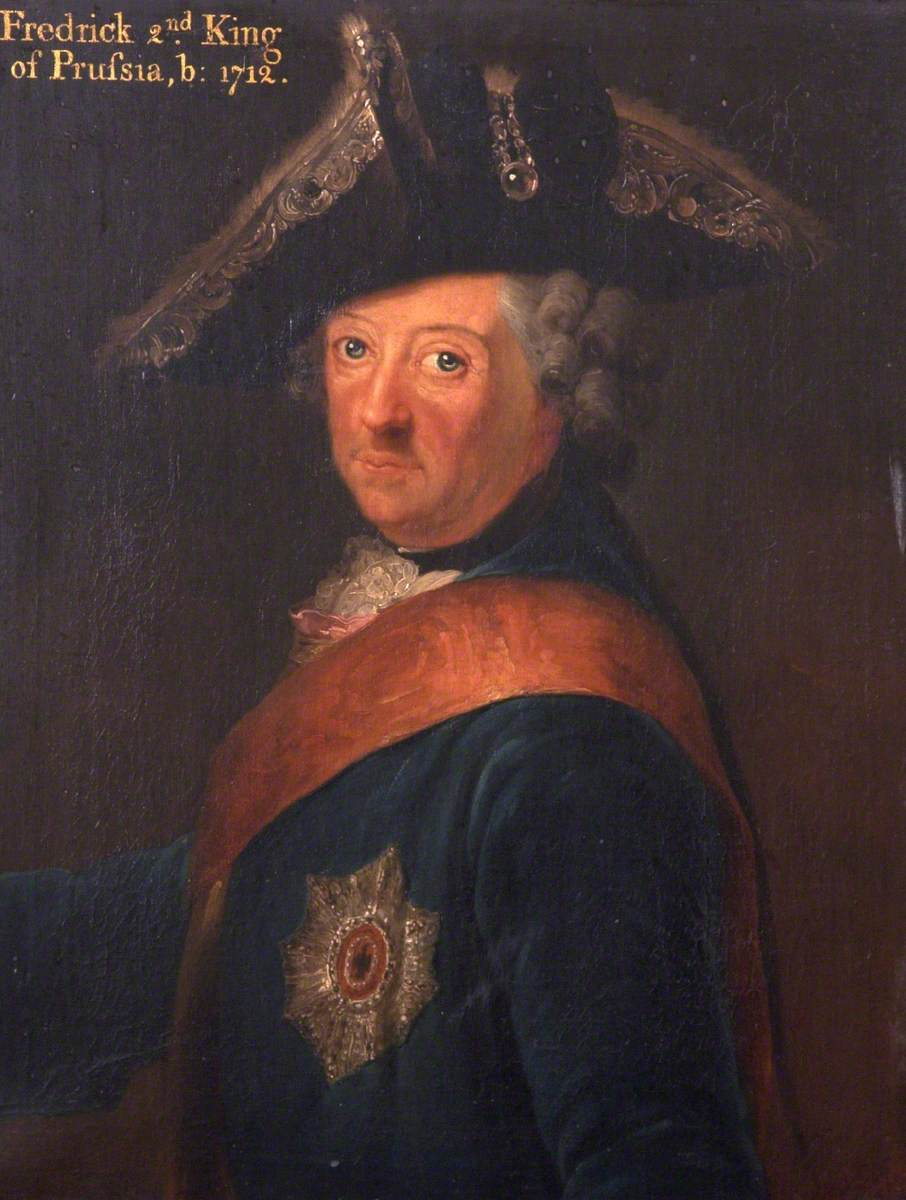
Frederick the Great

When Frederick William I ascended the throne he found Prussia highly indebted, and he made order, diligence, modesty, and the fear of God the guiding principles for his successful reform and reorganization of the state. He saw himself as a moral role model for his subjects. Frederick the Great, unlike his father, was an aesthete who admired Voltaire and the French Enlightenment, and was not inclined toward Pietism. He nevertheless felt himself bound to many of his father's ideals and deviated only slightly from Frederick William's self-image as the "first sergeant to the King of Prussia", saying that he wished to be the "first servant of his state". He regarded the Enlightenment ideals of reason and tolerance as personal maxims of conduct in his governance of Prussia.

Through Frederick William and his son, the values of Pietism were combined with those of the Enlightenment. They gave Prussia a progressive legal system and administration, an officer corps loyal to the crown, and a "patriotism of reason" that promoted Prussia's rise from the baroque state of the Great Elector Frederick William (r. 1640–1688) to a modern European power. The change came about in spite of Prussia's economically meager resources – it had suffered great devastation and depopulation during the Thirty Years' War (1618–1648) and had sandy, poorly arable soils that led it to be called "the blotting-sand box of the Holy Roman Empire".

The Prussian Reform Movement, which began after Prussia's 1806 defeat by Napoleon in the Battle of Jena–Auerstedt and lasted until the Congress of Vienna in 1815, also influenced the kingdom's later development. The reforms affected municipalities, the army, schools, universities, and taxes and included the 1812 Edict of Emancipation that, with a few restrictions, granted Prussian Jews the same rights and duties as other citizens. The reform of the army was particularly important for the development of Prussian values by permanently changing the relationship between king and soldier and "turning the uniform jacket into a cloak of honor". It is possible that the new leadership principle of mission-type tactics based on a willingness to assume responsibility, which was developed after the 1813 wars of liberation against Napoleon (but had precursors going back to Frederick the Great), also grew out of the ideals that created the Prussian symbiosis of Pietism and the Enlightenment.

The Prussian virtues are summed up in the first lines of Ludwig Hölty's poem "Der alte Landmann an seinen Sohn" ("The Old Farmer to His Son"). It was set to the tune of "Ein Mädchen oder Weibchen" ("A girl or little wife") from Mozart's 1791 opera Die Zauberflöte ("The Magic Flute") and performed daily by the carillon of the Potsdam Garrison Church where Frederick the Great was originally buried. The poem begins, "Practice always faithfulness and honesty / To your cold grave / And do not deviate a finger's breadth / From God's ways."

== The virtues ==
The Prussian virtues are not fixed in number or type and therefore do not form a canon. With the exception of obedience, they all go back to the cardinal virtues (generally prudence, justice, fortitude, and temperance).

=== Virtues with predominantly military significance ===
Although they did not originate in the military sphere, the ideals of Prussian virtues strongly influenced it and became soon some of its most prominent features. A strict hierarchy was characteristic of the Prussian social system, with the result that characteristics to be striven for included loyalty, a self-denial that benefits the state and the king (German author Walter Flex praised the Prussian soldier's oath of allegiance in a poem: "He who swears by the Prussian flag no longer has anything that belongs to himself",) bravery without self-pity ("Learn to suffer without complaining"), subordination, courage, and obedience (but not without frankness). (Self-)discipline, an indispensable military virtue, involved toughness (Härte) towards oneself even more than towards others.

=== Virtues of overall social significance ===
- Fear of God (Gottesfurcht)
- Sincerity (Aufrichtigkeit)
- Modesty (Bescheidenheit)
- Honesty (Ehrlichkeit)
- Diligence (Fleiß)
- Straightforwardness (Geradlinigkeit)
- Sense of justice (Gerechtigkeitssinn): suum cuique = to each his own / his due, the motto of the Prussian Order of the Black Eagle
- Conscientiousness (Gewissenhaftigkeit)
- Willingness to make sacrifices (Opferbereitschaft)
- Sense of order (Ordnungssinn)
- Sense of duty (Pflichtbewusstsein)
- Punctuality (Pünktlichkeit)
- Probity (Redlichkeit)
- Cleanliness (Sauberkeit)
- Frugality (Sparsamkeit)
- Tolerance (Toleranz)
- Incorruptibility (Unbestechlichkeit)
- Restraint / self-effacement (Zurückhaltung): Mehr sein als scheinen ("To be more than to appear")
- Determination (Zielstrebigkeit)
- Reliability (Zuverlässigkeit)

It is to these virtues that the obsolete saying that someone does something pour le Roi de Prusse ("for the King of Prussia", i.e. for free, without taking anything in return) is sometimes attributed.

=== Virtues of worldview ===
Fear of God was considered a Prussian virtue since at least the time of Frederick William I. Under his son, too, it continued to be given high priority, although under the aspect of religious tolerance. "Everyone shall be blessed according to his own fashion" became Frederick the Great's leitmotiv. His state-sponsored cosmopolitanism also had economic motives. When Frederick allowed Jews into the country, he obliged them to pay high special taxes.

=== Typical quotes ===
In his novel Der Stechlin, Theodor Fontane had an officer say:

"Service is everything, and dashingness is only bravado. [...] The truly noble obey not a ruler but a sense of duty. What is incumbent upon us is not the pleasure of life, not even love, real love, but only duty. This is moreover something specifically Prussian. We are distinguished by it above other nations, and even among those who do not understand it and wish us ill, the idea dawns that our superiority arises from it."

The inscription on the headstone of General Johann Friedrich Adolf von der Marwitz, who refused Frederick the Great's order to sack Hubertusburg Castle during the Seven Years' War reads: "He chose disgrace where obedience did not bring honor".

French proverb: Être Prussien est un honneur, mais pas un plaisir. ("To be Prussian is an honor but not a pleasure.")

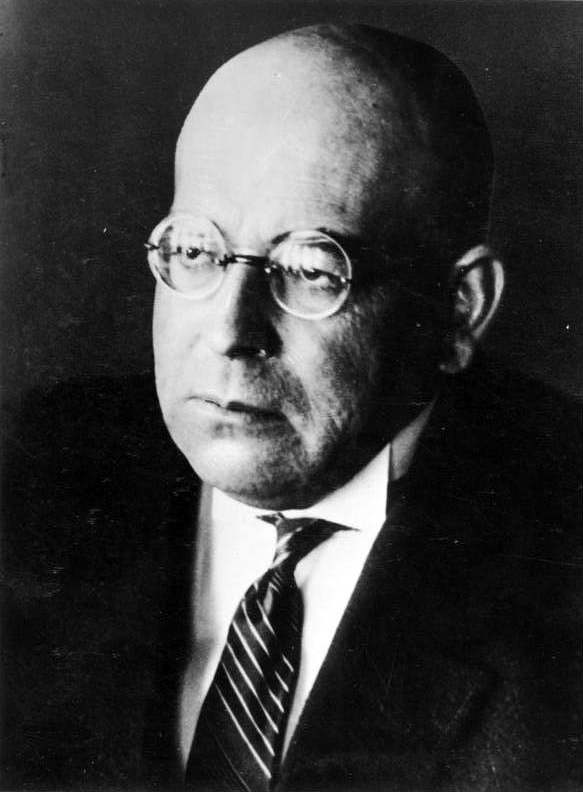
Oswald Spengler

In his 1919 Preußentum und Sozialismus, the philosopher of history Oswald Spengler judged Prussianism to be the basis of a specifically German, essentially illiberal, anti-democratic and anti-revolutionary school of thought:

"The German, or more precisely Prussian instinct was: power belongs to the whole. The individual serves it. The whole is sovereign. The king is only the first servant of his state (Frederick the Great). Everyone has his place. He is commanded and he obeys."

== Criticism ==
Prussian virtues were criticized from the beginning, as for example among the bourgeoisie, because of their remoteness from science and art, their hostility to democracy, and their state-controlled and militaristic characteristics – "command and obedience". The labor movement turned against the latter two traits in particular. During the 1960s protests, because loyalty and obedience toward the Nazi regime had been so prevalent among the German people, those virtues were viewed with extreme suspicion and devalued as "secondary virtues" compared to the emancipatory "primary virtues".

The American Richard Rhodes saw Heinrich Himmler's principle of Prussian "toughness" as a prerequisite for hundreds of thousands of Germans to willingly carry out the extermination of Jews:

Himmler strove to make the repulsive task of slaughtering unarmed civilians part of the SS aura. In his efforts he was able to draw on the Prussian military tradition, according to which morally reprehensible and psychologically stressful experiences were transformed into a virtue: toughness.

Himmler also invoked the virtue of toughness in the fall of 1940 when he told SS officers that the SS had to remove hundreds of thousands of Poles in Poland in minus 40°C weather and "have the toughness" to shoot thousands of leading Poles.

"It must always be the case that such an execution has to be the hardest thing for our men. And they must never become soft, but go about it with their teeth clenched."

Since Germany's defeat in World War II and the Allied denazification campaign, historical German militarism has become anathema in German culture, which is focused on collective responsibility and Vergangenheitsbewältigung ("overcoming the past"). At the same time, the related non-military, bourgeois virtues of efficiency, discipline, and work remain in high standing. This has led to the concept of "Prussian virtues" being regarded with mixed feelings in modern-day Germany. Among the German student protests of 1968, militarist virtues were rejected as having been prerequisites for the atrocities committed by the Nazi regime. The term Kadavergehorsam (lit. "corpse obedience") for "blind obedience", originally a slur directed against Jesuits during the 1870s Kulturkampf, came to be used as a staple derogatory against the Prussian military ethos. Similarly, the term Nibelungentreue ("Nibelung loyalty"), which in the German Empire had been used in a positive sense for the military virtue of absolute loyalty, came to be used derogatorily in reference to the fanatical loyalty characteristic of fascism. In 1982, amid the controversy surrounding the NATO Double-Track Decision, in response to Social Democratic Party of Germany (SPD) Chancellor Helmut Schmidt's call for a return to such virtues, Saarbrücken's SPD mayor Oskar Lafontaine commented that they were "perfectly suited to run a concentration camp". In 2006, the Minister President of Brandenburg Matthias Platzeck called for a return to Prussian virtues, citing "good basic virtues, such as honesty, reliability, and diligence".

== See also ==
- Furor Teutonicus – Latin phrase
- Imperial German influence on Republican Chile
- Law of Jante – Code of conduct assumed to describe Nordic countries
- Protestant work ethic – Social-theologic concept
- Prussian Army – Land forces of Prussia (1701–1919)
- Stoicism – Ancient philosophy
- Virtue – Positive trait or quality deemed to be morally good
- Bushido – Moral code of the samurai
- Enlightened Absolutism – Political philosophy
