= Haël Workshops for Artistic Ceramics =

Haël Workshops for Artistic Ceramics G.m.b.H. was a company which produced stoneware and was founded in 1923 by Dr Gustav Loebenstein, his wife Margarete (née Heymann) and Daniel Loebenstein, housed on a lease basis in a former cocklestove factory, as the successor of the manufacturing company Petry in Marwitz, in the Margraviate of Brandenburg.

== History ==
As the business was going well, the shareholders were able to purchase and extend the company premises in 1927. In doing so, they based the design and décor of the facilities on the Velten-Vordamm stoneware factories. Margarete Loebenstein had also worked there previously.

In March 1928, the Loebenstein brothers were killed in an accident on the way to a trade fair in Leipzig. Initially, the widow was successful in carrying on the business alone and, during the world financial crisis, was even able, despite sustained business losses, to present the new and understated crockery design "Norma" from 28 August to 1 September 1932 at the Leipzig Trade Fair. Yet the annual losses for the business year 1932 amounted to 33,768 Reichsmarks. The company failed to exhibit at the Leipzig Spring Trade Fair. New investment was needed for the continuation of the business in the old cocklestove factory, which Margarete Loebenstein closed down at the beginning of July 1933.

August Wojak, the works manager who had been taken on from the Velten works of the stoneware manufacturer Velten-Vordamm, which went bankrupt in 1931, now tried to win over Adolf Kruckau, the Director of the successor company Ceramic Works Vordamm to the idea of re-founding the Velten factory in the old Marwitz cocklestove factory. Margarete Loebenstein had previously worked in the Velten works and the plan was for her to take on the role of artistic director and a half of the shares, amounting to 20,000 Reichsmarks. This was what was agreed between Kruckau and the liquidator appointed by Loebenstein, Dr Max Silberstein. Yet in September 1933, Loebenstein closed down the company once and for all and attempted to found a new company in Jerusalem. As Nora Herz wrote to Hedwig Bollhagen, Margarete Loebenstein was expected back on 17 November for new negotiations on the basis of the agreements made previously.

Heinrich Schild, who had already given his support to the workers who were laid off at the Velten works of the Velten-Vordamm stoneware factory as a bankruptcy advisor in 1931, restarted the negotiations and, on 1 May 1934, through the founding of the HB Workshops for Ceramics, was able to set up a new workplace for the employees of the stoneware factories, under the artistic direction of Hedwig Bollhagen. Schild took on the role of an unpaid managing director. Bollhagen became an employee of the new business. She was able to include existing and new kinds of decoration and existing and new models, through the use of both the repertoire of the Haël Workshops – including the "Norma" series – and that of the Velten-Vordamm stoneware factories—including, through the re-employment of the painters, the "paradise pattern" by Charlotte Hartmann —and add these to new groups of designs. Special pieces continued to be produced too. Margarete Loebenstein received a share in the profits and was now in Berlin, devoting her attention to painting, with some success. She emigrated between 1937 and 1938.

== Employees (selection) ==
- Ewald Mataré

== Literature ==
- Gisela Reineking von Bock: Masters of German Ceramics 1900 to 1950. Cologne 1978, page 136.

== See also ==
- History of the Ceramics Industry in Marwitz
- History of the Ceramics Industry in Velten
