= Marwitz =

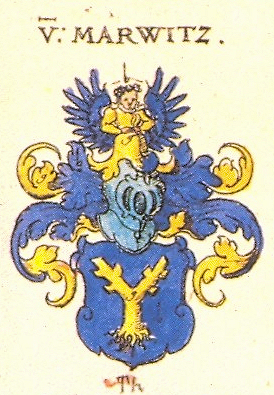
Coat of arms of von der Marwitz family

The family von der Marwitz is the name of one of the oldest German noble family from Brandenburg, whose members occupied significant positions in the Kingdom of Prussia and later within the German Empire.

== History ==
The family history begins in 1259 with Theodoricus de Marwiz. It originates from the village of Marwitz, Neumark, which was the German name of what is today Marwice, Lubusz Voivodeship, in western Poland.

== Notable members ==
- Bernhard von der Marwitz (1824–1880), Politician
- Friedrich August Ludwig von der Marwitz (1777–1837), General and politician
- Georg von der Marwitz (1856–1929), General
- Georg Wilhelm von der Marwitz (ca. 1723–1759), Major, quartermaster, and adjutant
- Gustav Ludwig von der Marwitz (1730–1797), General
- Hans-Georg von der Marwitz (1893–1925), World War I pilot
- Hans-Georg von der Marwitz (born 1961), German politician (CDU)
- Heinrich Karl von der Marwitz (1680–1744), General
- Joachim von der Marwitz (1603–1662), public servant
- Johann Friedrich Adolf von der Marwitz (1723–1781), General
- Johannes Nepomuk von der Marwitz (1795–1886), Bishop of Culm
- Ralf von der Marwitz (1888–1966), Navy Officer
- Siegmund von der Marwitz (1586–1660), public servant
