= St. Kilian's Church, Heilbronn =

Coordinates: 49°08′30″N 9°13′09″E

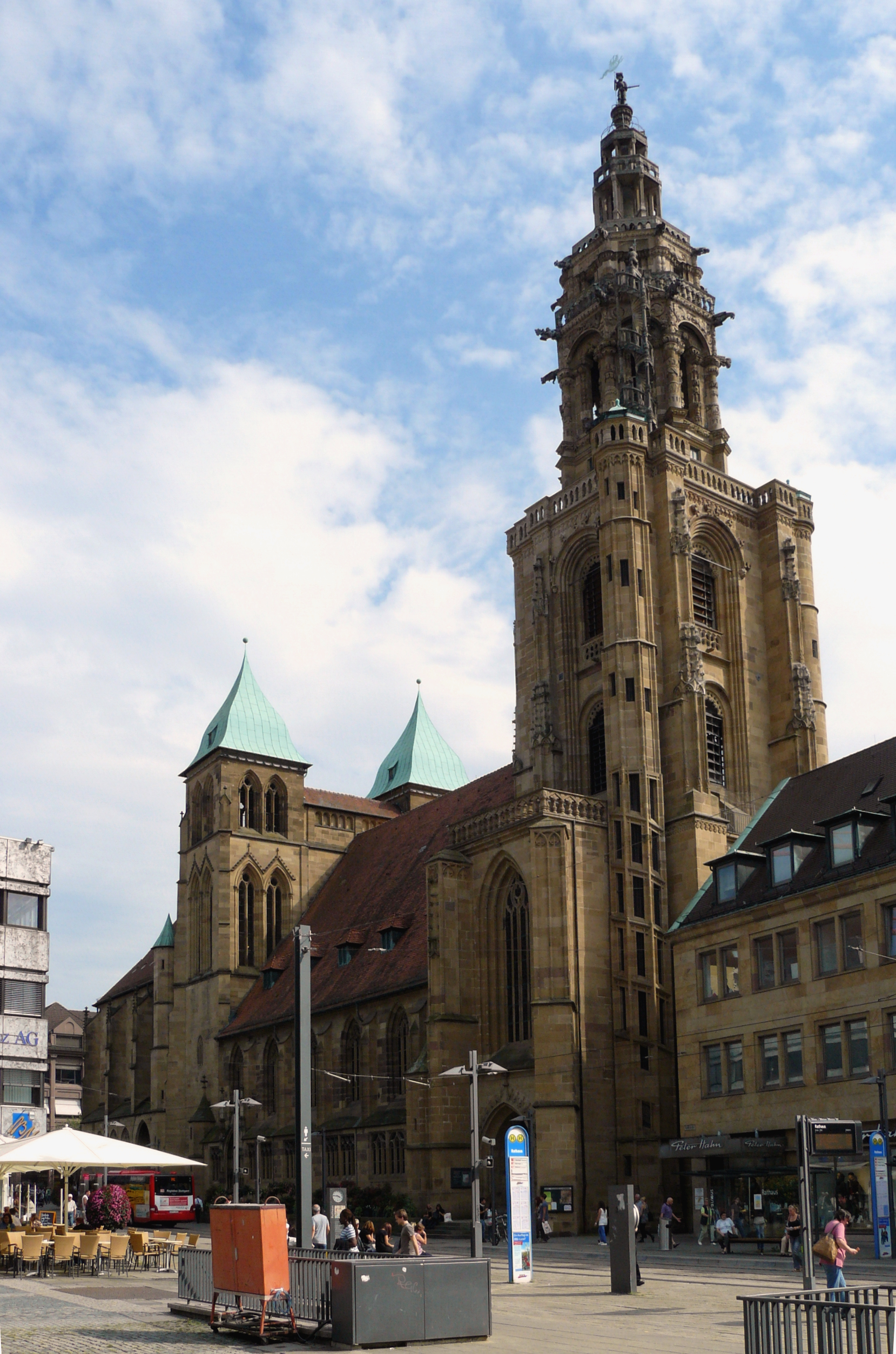
Western View of St. Kilian

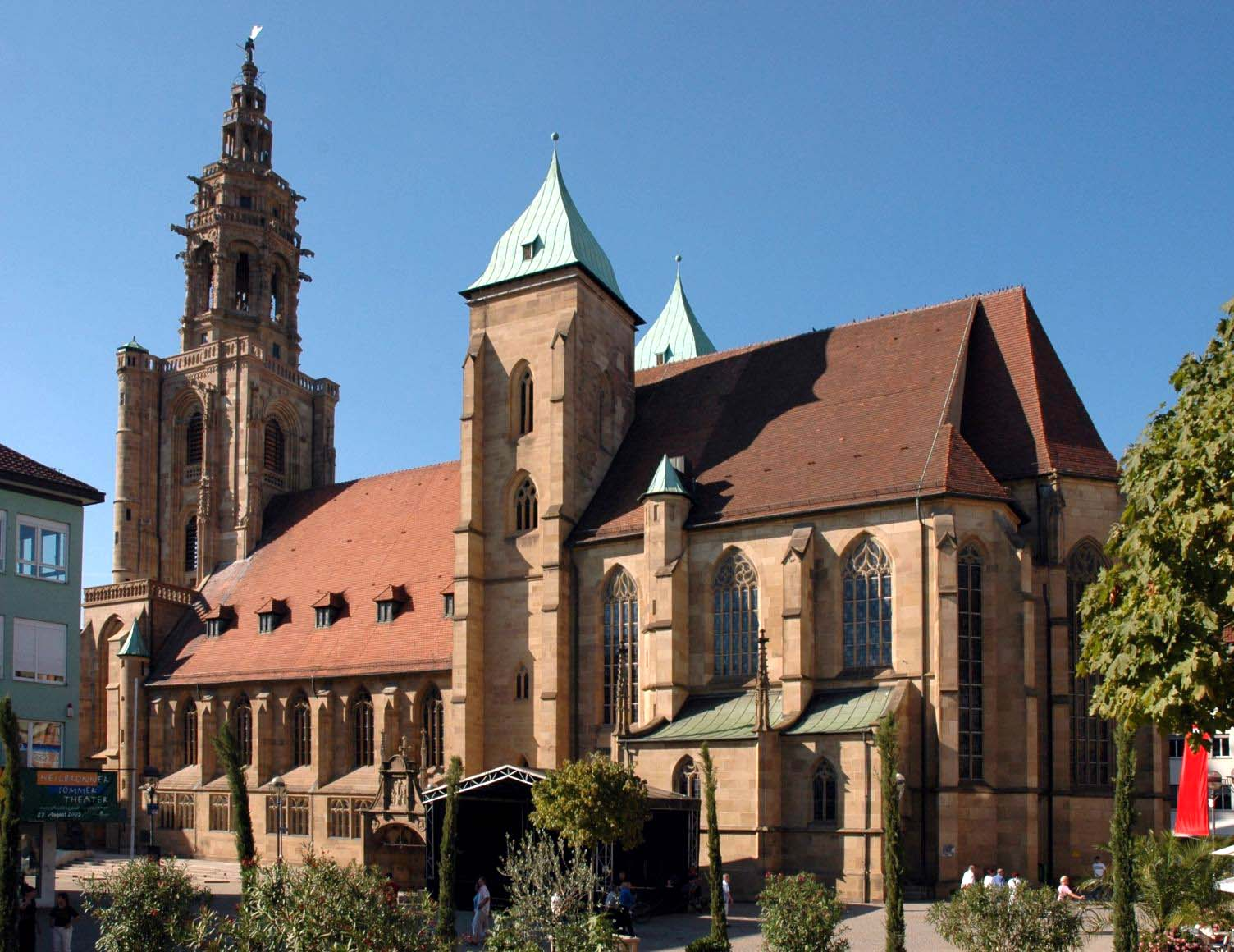
St. Kilian as seen from Kilian's Plaza

Kilian's Church on Kaiserstraße (Kaiser Street) in Heilbronn is a Gothic hall church constructed from Heilbronner sandstone,and its origin dates back to the 11th century. Its western tower, constructed by Hans Schweiner, is one of the first major Renaissance buildings to be built north of the Alps. Inside the church there is an altar by Hans Seyffer from 1498, which is regarded as a masterpiece of sculpture from the Late German Gothic period. Some of the stained glass is by Charles Crodel. The Monument Foundation of Baden-Württemberg appointed the church as monument of the month in December 2016.

== History ==
=== Construction ===
The first church in Heilbronn was the St. Michael's Basilica, mentioned in the founding documents of the Roman Catholic Diocese of Würzburg in the year 741, and mentioned for a second time in another official document in 899. It is very likely that this church was in the same place where the St. Kilian's church stands today, but this thesis lacks definitive proof. Excavations in 1880 found that there was a small romanesque church, sized 10x11m in the same place around the year 1100. Instead of this small romanesque church, there was a considerably more sizeable early gothic church in 1280. Its year of construction is unknown. The church was sanctified to Saint Kilian in the 13th century, a letter of indulgence from the year 1297 is the first source to mention the new name. After planning had started in 1508, the construction of the new western tower by Hans Schweiner was heavily influenced by the reformation and was finally completed in the year 1529. It is supposedly "one of the most original pieces of work from the Early Renaissance in Germany" as well as the first major Renaissance building north of the alps.

=== Destruction in 1944 ===
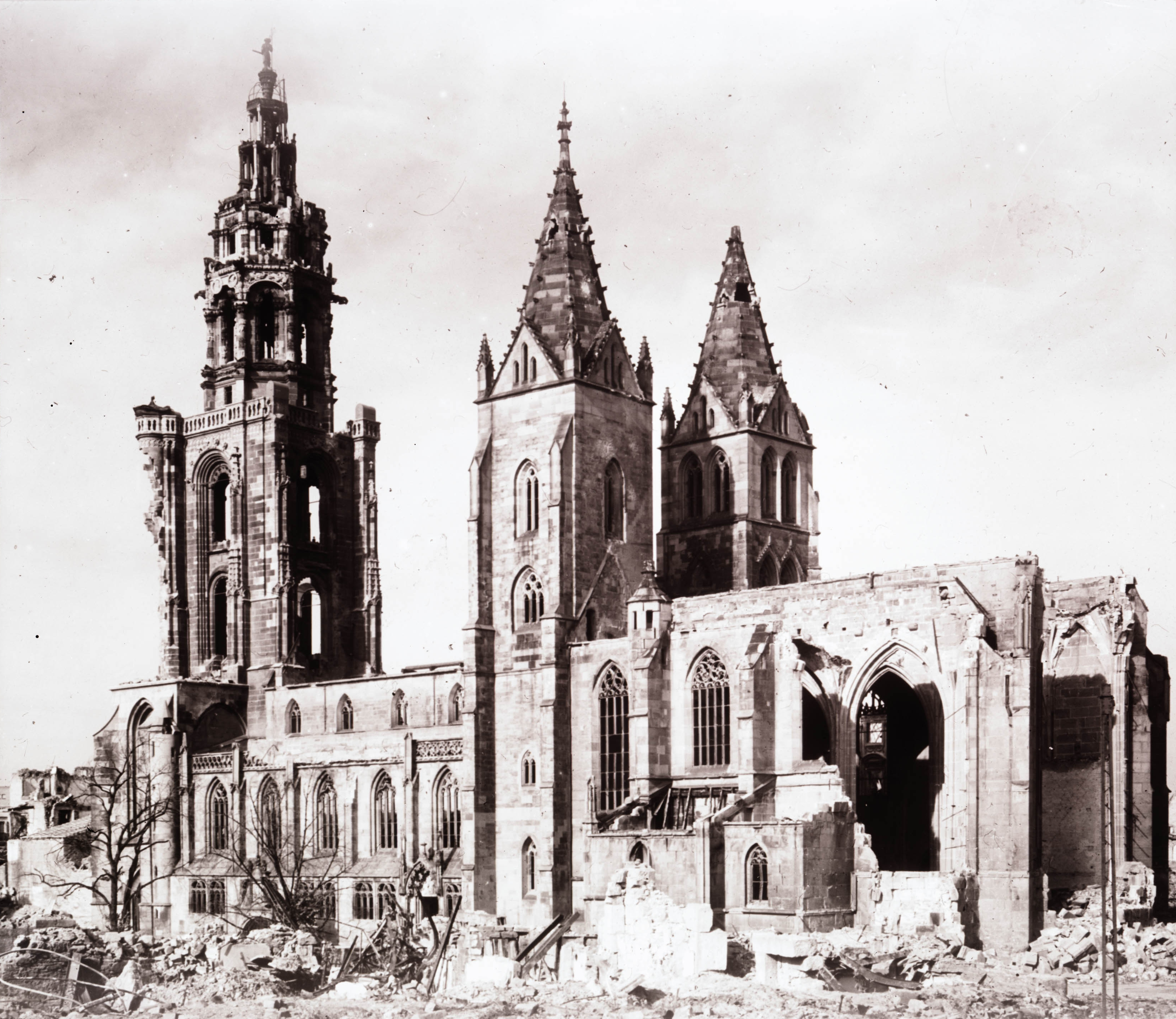
St. Kilian's Church in ruins 1944

When World War II broke out, most of the art treasures, such as the altar or the stained glass in the church were moved to the tunnels of the salt mine in Kochendorf. On September 10, 1944, American incendiary bombs damaged the roof. The British attack on December 4, 1944, destroyed almost the entire church. In April 1945, American artillery damaged the church even further.

=== Reconstruction from 1946 to 1974 ===
The reconstruction was divided into several phases. After the rubble was cleared away in 1946 and 1947, the reconstruction began in 1948 under the supervision of the renowned architect Professor Hannes Meyer. Most Neogothical elements from the renovations made during the 19th century were not reconstructed, instead the architect aimed to bring out the Renaissance core of the church.

The penultimate phase was completed after the stained glass was finished by Charles Crodel in 1967 and the altar was put back into its original place on December 1, 1986. Officially, the renovation ended on November 17, 1974, after the western tower was fully repaired.

== Choir ==
The Late Gothic choir is brought together by a colourful stained glass window by Charles Crodel.

=== The High Altar by Hans Seyffer ===
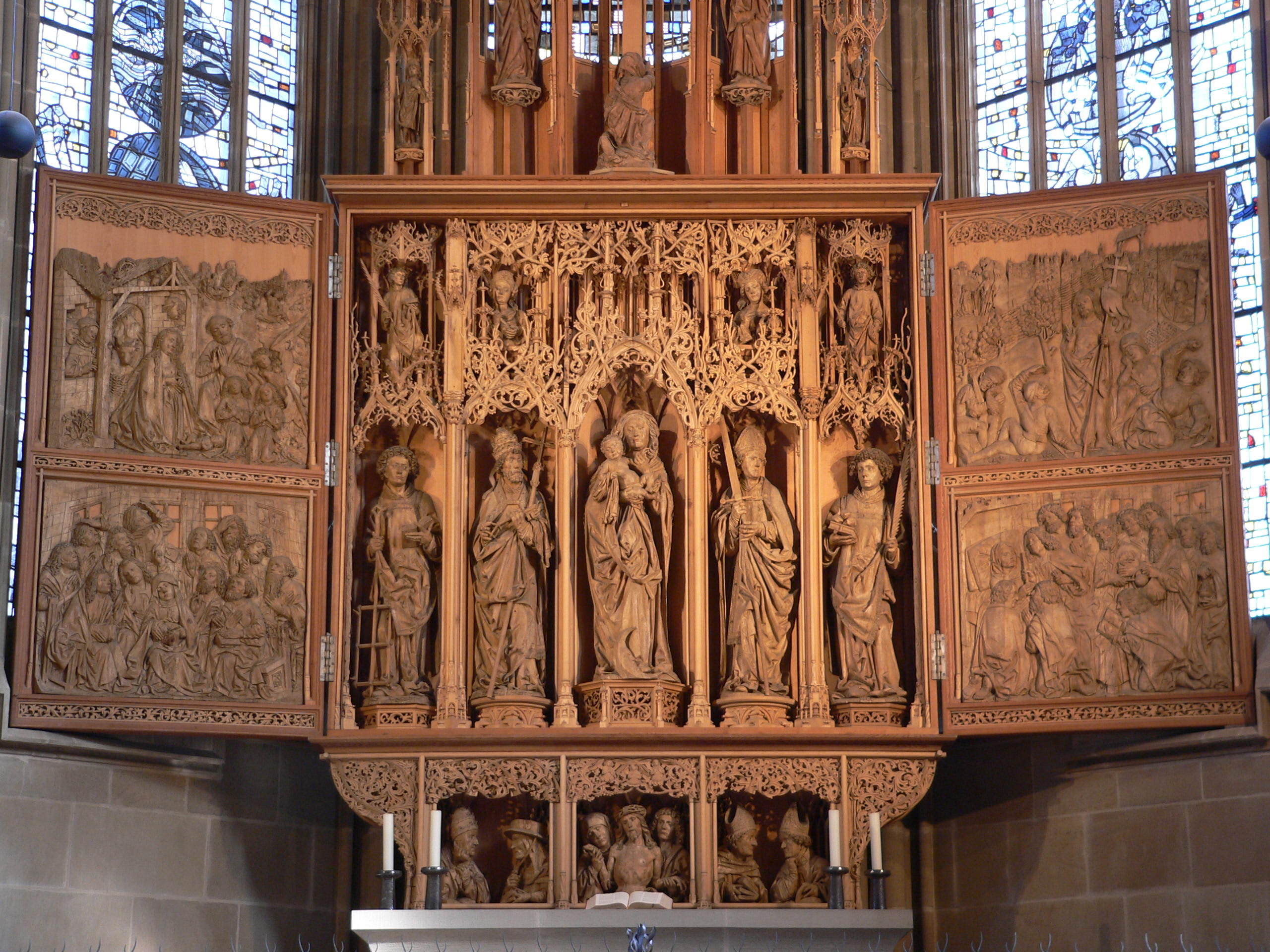
The high altar

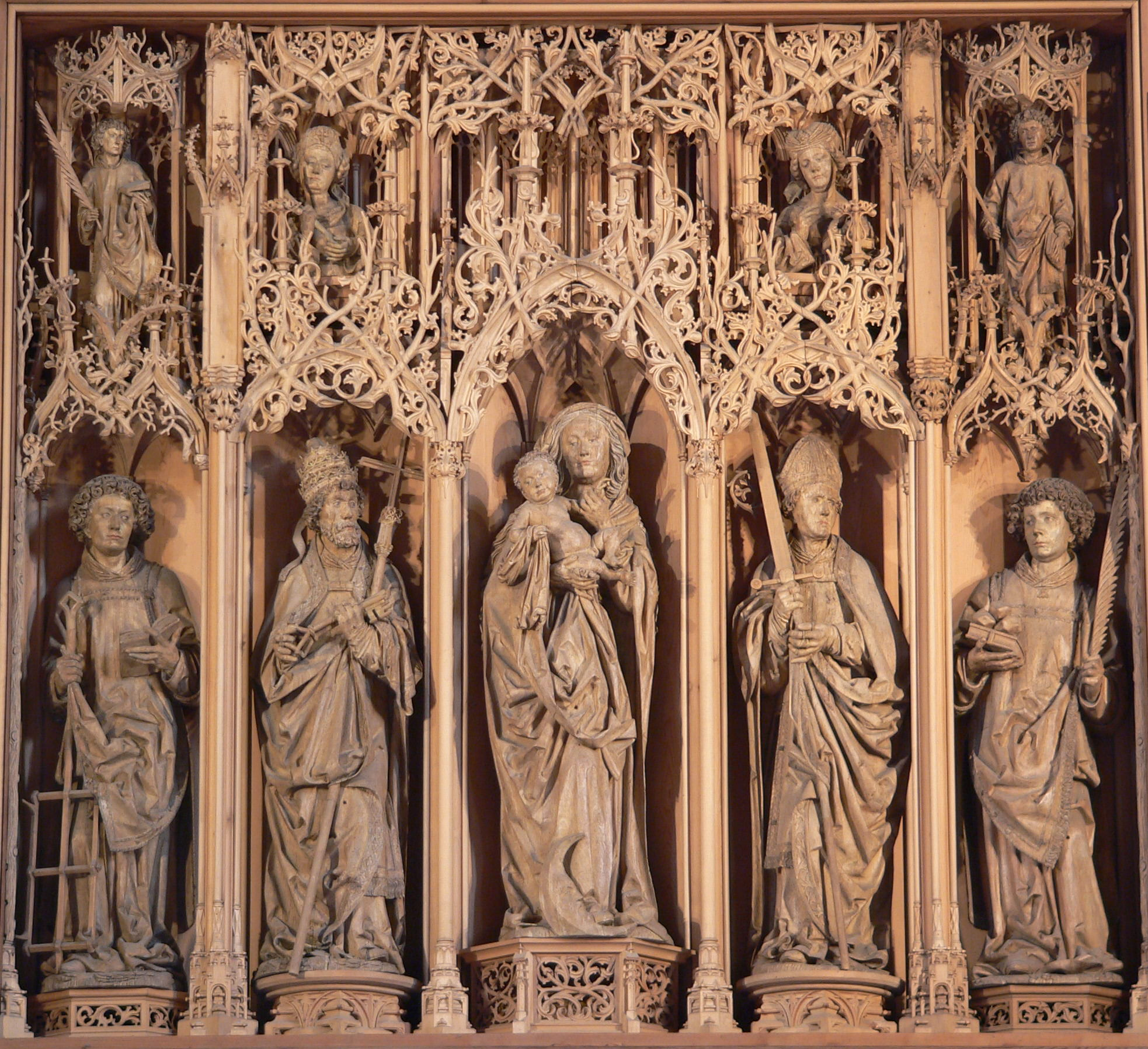
Figures in the altar shrine

The high altar contains numerous figures, reliefs and decorative attachments. The altar is 11.64 metres high and 7.68 metres wide and contains three parts (predella, shrine with side panels and a superstructure). During the Second World War, the altar was dismantled. The figures and the relief panels from the sides survived in the Kochberg salt mines at a depth of 200 metres, while the superstructure and the shrines were walled in the western tower of the church. The decision to begin reconstruction came after long deliberations and with the approval of the monument administrator, Count Adelmann. In seven years the parts that had been destroyed were reconstructed by the restorer Walter Hammer and sculptor Josef Wolfsteiner.

Soon after his death the sculptor responsible for the altar fell into obscurity, and the altar ended up being attributed to the Würzburg sculptor Tilman Riemenschneider until the end of the 19th century. Eventually it was determined through research and style comparisons that Hans von Heilbronn had to have been the sculptor. In the year 1909 Moriz von Rauch found the full name of the sculptor: Master Hans Seyffer while looking through documents in the Heilbronner Archive. Any uncertainty that may have remained was cleared in 1963 when the restorer Walter Hammer uncovered the "Hans Syfer" label while doing restoration. In the upper right wing the year 1498 is engraved in the top right, this most likely refers to the year of completion.
