= Hippolyte-Romain Duthilloeul =

French litterateur and bibliographer (1788–1862)

Hippolyte-Romain-Joseph Duthilloeul (8 November 1788 - March 1862) was a French litterateur and bibliographer. He was born in Douai on November 8, 1788, was a war commissary in Spain in the service of Joseph Bonaparte, and a senior administrative officer in 1814. He was appointed justice of the peace at Douai in 1830, and become the librarian of that city in 1834. He has written numerous book on local history, including a biographical dictionary of notable men of the city of Douai.

== Selected works ==
- (in French) Galeries douaisienne, ou Biographie des hommes remarquables de la ville de Douai, by R.-H. Duthilloeul, 1844
