= Commissar =

Military political officer in Communist countries

Commissar (or sometimes Kommissar) is an English transliteration of the Russian комиссáр (komissar), which means 'commissary'. In English, the transliteration commissar often refers specifically to the political commissars of Soviet and Eastern-bloc armies or to the people's commissars (effectively government ministers), while administrative officers are called commissaries.

The Russian word комиссар, from French commissaire, was used in Russia for both political and administrative officials. The title has been used in the Soviet Union and in Russia since the time of the emperor Peter the Great (r. 1682–1725).

== History ==
In the 18th and 19th centuries in the Russian army kommissars, then krigs-komissars (from German: Krieg 'war') were officials in charge of supply for the armed forces (see Rus. Генерал-кригскомиссар).

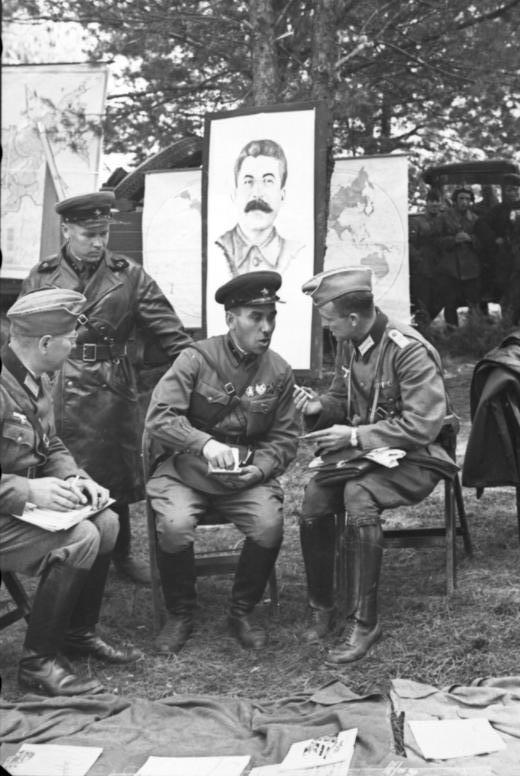
Russian political commissar in leather coat at the German-Soviet military parade in Brest-Litovsk on September 22, 1939.

Commissaries were used during the Provisional Government (March–July 1917) for regional heads of administration, but the term commissar is associated with a number of Cheka and military functions in Bolshevik and Soviet government military forces during the Russian Civil War (the White Army widely used the collective term "bolsheviks and commissars" for their opponents) and with the later terms People's Commissar (or narkom) for government ministers and political commissar in the military.

== Variants ==
=== People's Commissar ===
A People's Commissar (informally abbreviated narkom) was a government official serving in a Council of People's Commissars. This title was first used by the Russian SFSR (out of dislike for the tsarist and bourgeois term minister) and then copied among the many Soviet and Bolshevik-controlled states in the Russian Civil War.

The government departments headed by a People's Commissar were called People's Commissariat (informally abbreviated narkomat).

People's Commissars and People's Commissariats were renamed Ministers and Ministries in 1946 by a decree of the Supreme Soviet of the Soviet Union.

=== Political commissar ===
In the Red Army, a political commissar was a high-ranking functionary at a military headquarters who held coequal rank and authority with the military commander of the unit. The Bolshevik Party established political commissars in 1918 to control and improve morale in the military forces. Commissars were in charge of communist political propaganda and indoctrinating the public with communist ideology. From 1917 the Bolshevik administration, like the Provisional Government before it, relied on experienced (ex-Tsarist) army-officers whose loyalty it distrusted. Trotsky summarised the solution to the issue: "We took a military specialist and we put on his right hand and on his left a commissar [...]." During the early stages of the usage of commissars, no military order might be issued which did not have the prior approval of both the commander and the commissar.

Many lower-level political officers never received the same military training as commanding officers. Prior to becoming a commissar an individual had to be registered as a communist for a minimum of three years and had to attend specific political institutions, many of which never offered any military-oriented training.

Following the problems encountered in 1941 with dual commanders in units, commissars and other political officers were removed from direct command-roles. Political officers were then more directly tasked with morale- and regulation-based goals. A political officer's classification changed to the form of a "Deputy for Political Matters" in 1942. The specific position of "Commissar" itself survived only at regimental and front levels, where the Commissars formed the Military Councils with their corresponding military commanders.

Other Communist-bloc militaries also adopted systems of using political commissars. Mulvenon and Yang (2002) report that the role of the political commissar in the People's Liberation Army (PLA) of China has become one resembling that of an HR specialist.

=== Military commissar ===
The voenkom (Russian: военком), translated as war commissar, is the head of a military commissariat — a regional office that conscripts people for military service, executes plans for military mobilization and maintains records on military reserves.

=== NKVD ===
Until the late 1930s, the People's Militsiya and Internal Troops of the NKVD had no personal ranks, and used many various position-ranks instead. In 1935, the Militsiya created a special system of personal ranks that was a blend of standard military ranks and position-ranks; this system was largely reused by the newly created Main Directorate of State Security (GUGB) in their rank structure, although they had Commissar-style ranks for top officers in place of Militsiya-style inspector and director.

From 1943, the Militsiya switched to a new rank system and insignia introduced in the Soviet Army. Instead of General ranks, top officers used Commissar of Militsiya 3rd, 2nd, and 1st rank, even though they used army-standard Major General, Lieutenant General and Colonel General shoulder boards. These Commissar ranks were replaced by corresponding General ranks in 1975.

The GUGB also switched to military-style ranks and insignia in 1945, although they replaced Commissar-style ranks with General officer ranks right away.

== Similar terms ==
Commissar is linked to titles in a variety of languages, such as commissary in English, commissaire in French, Kommissar in German, and komisszár (or népbiztos; archaic: csendbiztos) in Hungarian.

The term commissary was used by the British and U.S. military to denote an officer in charge of supplying an army with provisions and equipment (and Commissariat).

A similar term in French describes the equivalent of the rank of Major both in the army of the Ancien Régime and the French Revolution. Such officials were not military officers but reported back to the political authorities: the king and the National Assembly (French Revolution), respectively.

Various historical German states have used an equivalent title, Reichskommissar (a compound of Reich and the German Kommissar), for several administrators who held responsibility over a territory or area of government.

== See also ==
- Commissar Order
