= Hedwig Marquardt =

German painter

- Born: Hedwig Frieda Käthe Marquardt; 28 November 1884; Biere, Germany
- Died: 14 April 1969 (aged 84); Hanover, Germany
- Known for: Ceramic art, painting
- Movement: German Expressionism

Hedwig Marquardt (28 November 1884 – 14 April 1969) is one of a relatively small number of women artists whose work belongs to the German expressionist tradition.

== Education and artistic influences ==
Hedwig Frieda Käthe Marquardt was the daughter of Johann Friedrich Marquardt and Hedwig Franziska Marquardt. Her father was the village doctor in Biere, a village near Magdeburg, Germany. She initially trained as an art teacher in Kassel, but went on to study art at the Kunstgewerbeschule Magdeburg and then, under Professor Engels, at an academy in Munich in 1906–09. Very few of her pictures before the 1920s survive. The earliest show the influence of contemporary German landscape painters, particularly those of the Worpswede School, and, in her figurative painting, that of Käthe Kollwitz. By 1912 Marquardt was living in Berlin and studied for a time under Lovis Corinth. The art of the avant garde she saw here (in particular the work of artists such as Franz Marc, Wassily Kandinsky and Lyonel Feininger) allowed her to develop the artistic idiom that she followed, broadly speaking, for the rest of her life in her painting and graphic work. The figure of the horse, a symbol of energy and the free spirit, a recurrent image in her work, may derive from her country upbringing but also owes much to Marc. She exhibited in the Juryfreie Kunstschau (de) in Berlin in 1911 and 1913 and the Magdeburg Kunstschau of 1912. In 1914 she painted a large crucifixion for the village church at Biere.

== Ceramic work at Kieler Kunst-Keramik ==
As for so many women artists, Marquardt found it hard to make a living from her art, particularly in the troubled period after the First World War. She turned to ceramics, leaving Berlin in 1921 and moving to Karlsruhe, where she worked at the Grossherzogliche Majolika Manufaktur as a ceramic painter, decorating the work of others, particularly the popular figurines of birds by Emil Pottner. In 1922 she met the sculptor and ceramic artist Augusta Kaiser, who called herself Gust Kaiser from 1922 on and who was also working at the time as a ceramics painter at the Karlsruhe factory.

In 1924 she was invited by Philip Danner, who had himself left Karlsruhe factory to lead a new company producing ceramic art in Kiel, to join the Kieler Kunst-Keramik. Marquardt was only employed for a year at Kiel, but in this short time produced a significant body of original work that is well documented and regarded as very fine examples of ceramics produced at the height of the art deco period. However, her ceramic work owes as much to her background in expressionist painting as it does to the more purely decorative language of art deco. She was joined in this enterprise by her partner and artistic collaborator, the highly talented Augusta Kaiser (1895–1932). Never a person who found personal relations easy, Marquardt fell out with her employers and, with Kaiser, left Kiel on 31 March 1925. The two tried for a time to survive as independent artists, producing small ceramics, embroidery and illustrative and commercial art, but in 1927 Marquardt accepted a teaching post at a school in Hanover, a position she held until her retirement in 1949. After the early death of Kaiser in 1932, Marquardt shared her life with the artist Charlotte (Lotte) Boltze (1881—1959), a close friend ever since they had studied together in Munich.

== Identifying and dating her work ==
Apart from her ceramic work at Kiel, it is extremely difficult to date Marquardt's work. This is because her principal expressionist style remained remarkably consistent. Most of the work known to survive probably post-dates the Second World War. Whether more of her earlier work will be discovered remains to be seen. Her most typical work favours strong outlines and sweeping diagonals, often with stern, unsmiling faces. However, there are also gentler, more naturalistic depictions, particularly of trees, that look back to German Romanticism of the nineteenth century, also powerful woodcut-like pen and ink portraits that owe much to Dürer. She very rarely dated her work. On works where a date appears it is very likely that they have been subsequently added to make them appear earlier than they in truth are. Though some pictures are signed, many are not. There are paintings in oil, but most of her known surviving work is on paper, using a variety of media, often mixing coloured crayons with water colour.

== Reputation as a woman artist ==
The paucity of German women artists from the earlier twentieth century who are today widely known is an indication of how difficult it was for women to succeed in a male-dominated art world. The few that did, for example Gabriele Münter and Paula Modersohn-Becker, were often closely linked to successful male artists. Marquardt's need to turn to a teaching career to support herself, along with the repression of artistic freedom under the Third Reich, probably restricted her development as an artist. As a lesbian, she was also unable (and unwilling – she had a low opinion of men in general, though she drew and painted men more often than women) to look for male support. However, the evidence of her work shows an artist of distinct character and originality. The best of her work stands up well when set beside that of the more illustrious exponents of German Expressionism.

Examples of Marquardt’s work are in the collections of the British Museum, London, and the Leicester City Gallery. The Stadtmuseum Kiel and the Keramik-Museum Berlin hold ceramic pieces. Her work appears on the art market in Germany, England and the United States.
