= Harold Marks =

Harold Marks (23 February 1914 – 28 March 2005) was a British educationalist who worked in and for adult and post-school education.

== Life ==
Harold Marks was born in London and educated at Caterham School, University College, Oxford (BA in Modern Greats), and Wesleyan University, Connecticut. At Oxford he fell under the influence of G. D. H. Cole and Sandy Lindsay. He began his career in adult education in south Wales before taking up an appointment as Oxford University extramural tutor in Staffordshire 1936–42.

During the Second World War he served in the Royal Tank Regiment and the Royal Army Educational Corps. In 1946 he left the Army with the rank of captain.

After the War he was served as Rowntree Trust as Education Secretary to the Educational Centres Association and Educational Adviser to the National Federation of Community Associations. He joined Her Majesty's Inspectorate of Education in 1951, working in Yorkshire and Kent & Surrey before being promoted Staff Inspector in 1970.

If today the need for careers education, as opposed to job finding, is recognised as every young person's right and the duty of every school, it is due to his work as one of his/her majesty's inspectors of education (HMI), from 1951 to 1979.

— Peter Baynes and Konrad Elsdon, Obituary of Harold Marks

After retiring he worked for the National Association for the Care and Resettlement of Offenders and the National Voluntary Youth Organisation.

He was married to the German immigrant potter and artist Margarete Heymann, the former artistic director of the Haël Workshops for Artistic Ceramics, with whom he had a daughter, Frances Marks.

His published writings included:

- Chapters in Bernard Jennings, Community Education in England And Wales (1980)
- With K. T. Elsdon, Adults in the Colleges of Further Education (1991)
- Chapters in Enterprising Neighbours (1990)
- With K. T. Elsdon, An Education for the People? A History of HMI And Lifelong Education (2001)
