= Georg Wilhelm von der Marwitz =

Georg Wilhelm von der Marwitz (c. 1723 – c. 8 July 1759), also known as Black Marwitz, was a Prussian major, quartermaster, and adjutant to Frederick II of Prussia.

== Biography ==
In his youth, Marwitz was appointed as a page of Frederick the Great. He later became a favourite of Prince Henry, the king's younger brother. The king became aware of the relationship between the prince and the page. In March 1746, Frederick sent a series of satirical letters to Henry, poking fun at the prince's affection and Marwitz alike. After this spat between the brothers, Marwitz was dismissed from his post. Nonetheless, Prince Henry managed to secure Marwitz a position in the 1st Infantry Regiment. However, not long afterwards, the Prince is said to have "banished [Marwitz] from his sight, on account of duplicity and bad behavior." Henry seems to have suspected Marwitz of conspiring against his brother, Prince Augustus Ferdinand. Over the course of the next decade, Marwitz continuously fell in and out of favour with the king. Finally, in 1757, he regained the favour of both the ruler and the prince. Frederick granted him a position as an adjutant, and Prince Henry re-admitted him to his circle.

There are some indications that Marwitz possessed literary talents. In his satirical letter dated to March 3, 1746, Frederick mentions that Marwitz was allegedly writing elegies filled with passionate kisses to Prince Henry. Apparently, the king tutored Marwitz personally and permitted him to use the royal library. During the Seven Years' War, Frederick even commissioned Marwitz to write his biography.

Marwitz passed away on (or some days prior to) the 8th of July, 1759 in Landeshut, of a hot fever with measles. Frederick personally penned a letter to relay the news of Marwitz's passing to Prince Henry. Years later, the prince would dedicate a plaque on the Rheinsberg Obelisk to Marwitz. The last lines of the memorial inscription read: his merits and the services [he rendered] would be forgotten, if they were not preserved by this monument.

== Hochkirch Controversy ==
Fontane relates that prior to the Battle of Hochkirch in 1758, Marwitz "refused […] to make camp at the designated location, since it seemed ripe for attacking. He was consequently not only disgraced but also not awarded the Pour le mérite."

Henri de Catt, however, gives a different account of these events, apparently based on what Marwitz himself once told him. According to De Catt's recounting, the incident took place as follows: Some time before the Battle of Hochkirch, Frederick ordered Marwitz to set up camp. The king had long sought an excuse to reprimand his adjutant. Marwitz was consequently told that his camp was atrocious and against all common-sense rules. Marwitz was then put under house arrest until after the battle. The king subsequently arranged the camp at Hochkirch after his own fashion, telling Marwitz that he should follow the royal example. However, this encampment proved to be unsuitable in the following battle. The tale of Marwitz at Hochkirch is also recounted by a distant relative, Friedrich August Ludwig von der Marwitz. However, in his recounting, Marwitz is not punished for his objection to the royal orders. Thus, Friederich August's narrative is likely an idealized version of the events.
