= Hans Seyffer =

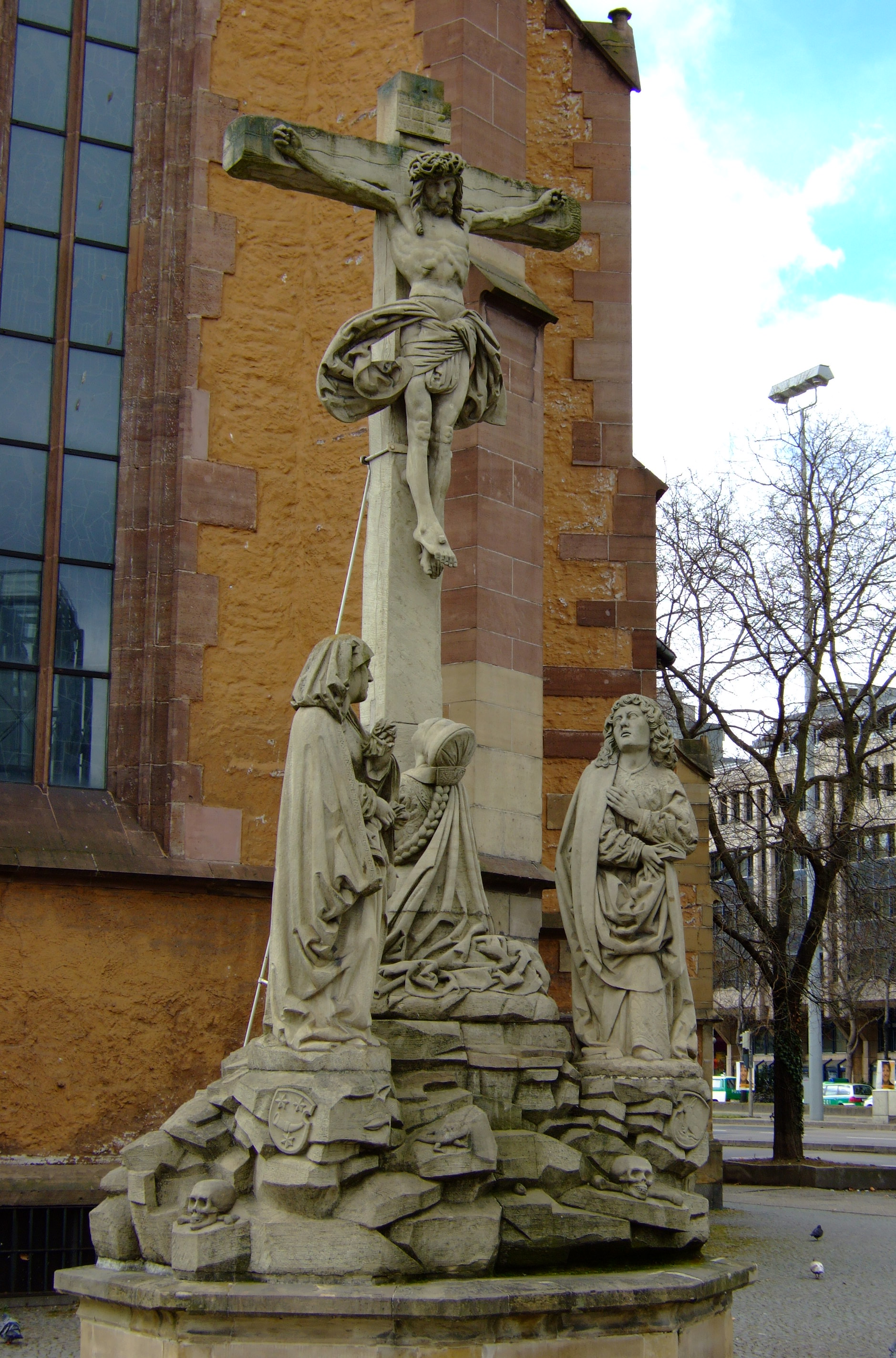
Copy of the crucifixion group of Hans Seyffer at the Leonhardskirche in Stuttgart

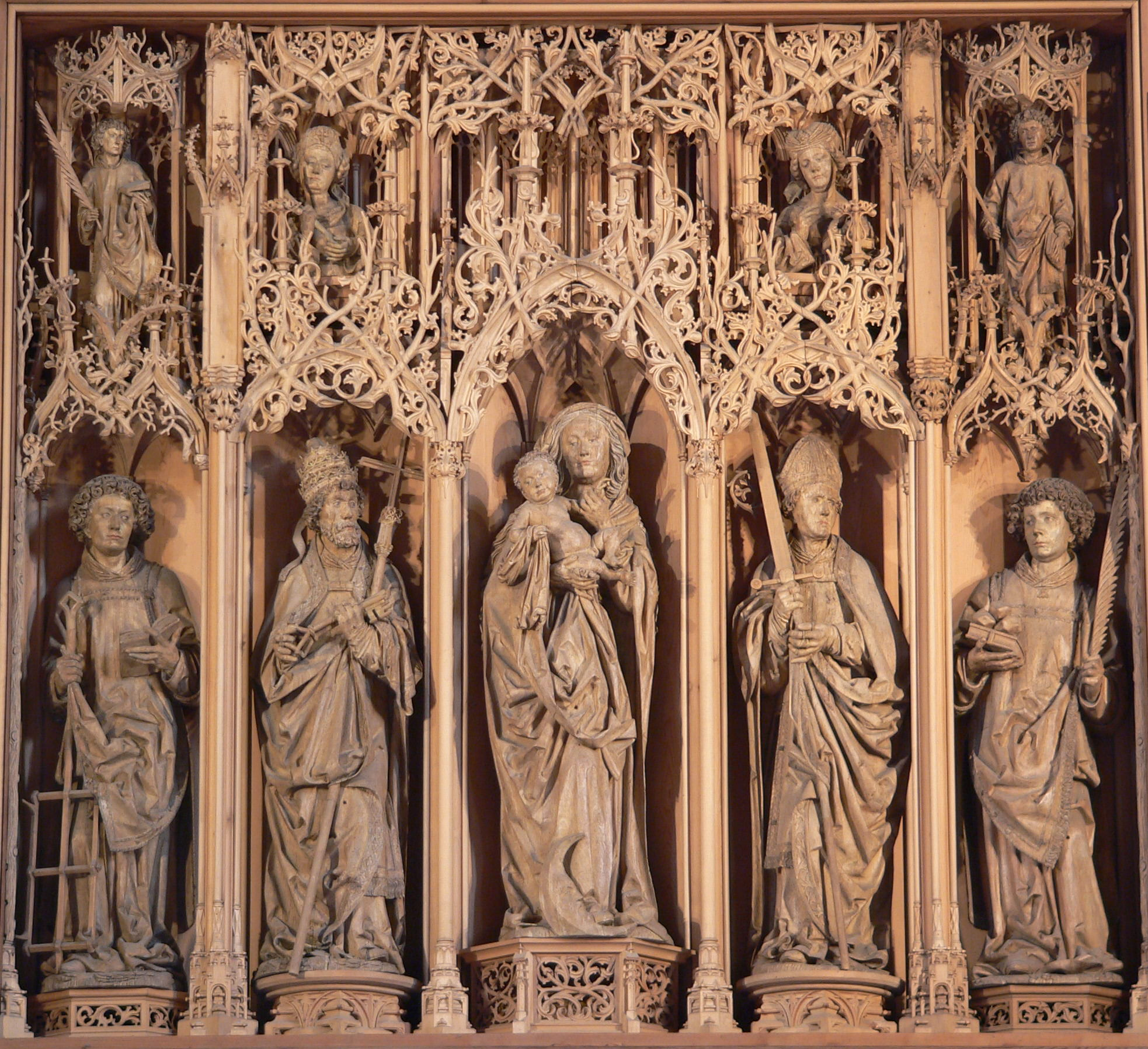
Sculptures in the shrine of the altar of the Kilianskirche Heilbronn

Hans Seyffer, also known as Hans Seyfer or Hans of Heilbronn (c.1460–1509), was a stone sculptor and wood carver of the late Gothic style.

== Biography ==
Seyffer was born in Sinsheim. Little else is known about his life. He lived and worked at a dramatic turn of an era (from late Gothic to Renaissance) together with other masters (e.g. Tilman Riemenschneider, Veit Stoss and Hans Brueggemann). He created many well-known works of art in Heilbronn (such as the High Altar of St. Kilian's Church) in Stuttgart and in Speyer (the original 1506-1509 Mount of Olives sculptural group was destroyed and replaced in the 19th century by images carved by Gottfried Renn). He died in Heilbronn.

== Major works ==
- 1498 the main altar of the St. Kilian's Church, Heilbronn
- 1501 the crucifixion group in the Leonhardskirchhof in Stuttgart (now in the Hospitalkirche in Stuttgart)
- 1502 the grave scene of Christ in the Oswaldkirche in Stuttgart
- 1506-1509 the Mount of Olives in the cathedral of Speyer (destroyed and replaced in the 19th century)
