= Keramik-Museum Berlin =

Berlin Ceramics Museum
- Keramik-Museum Berlin
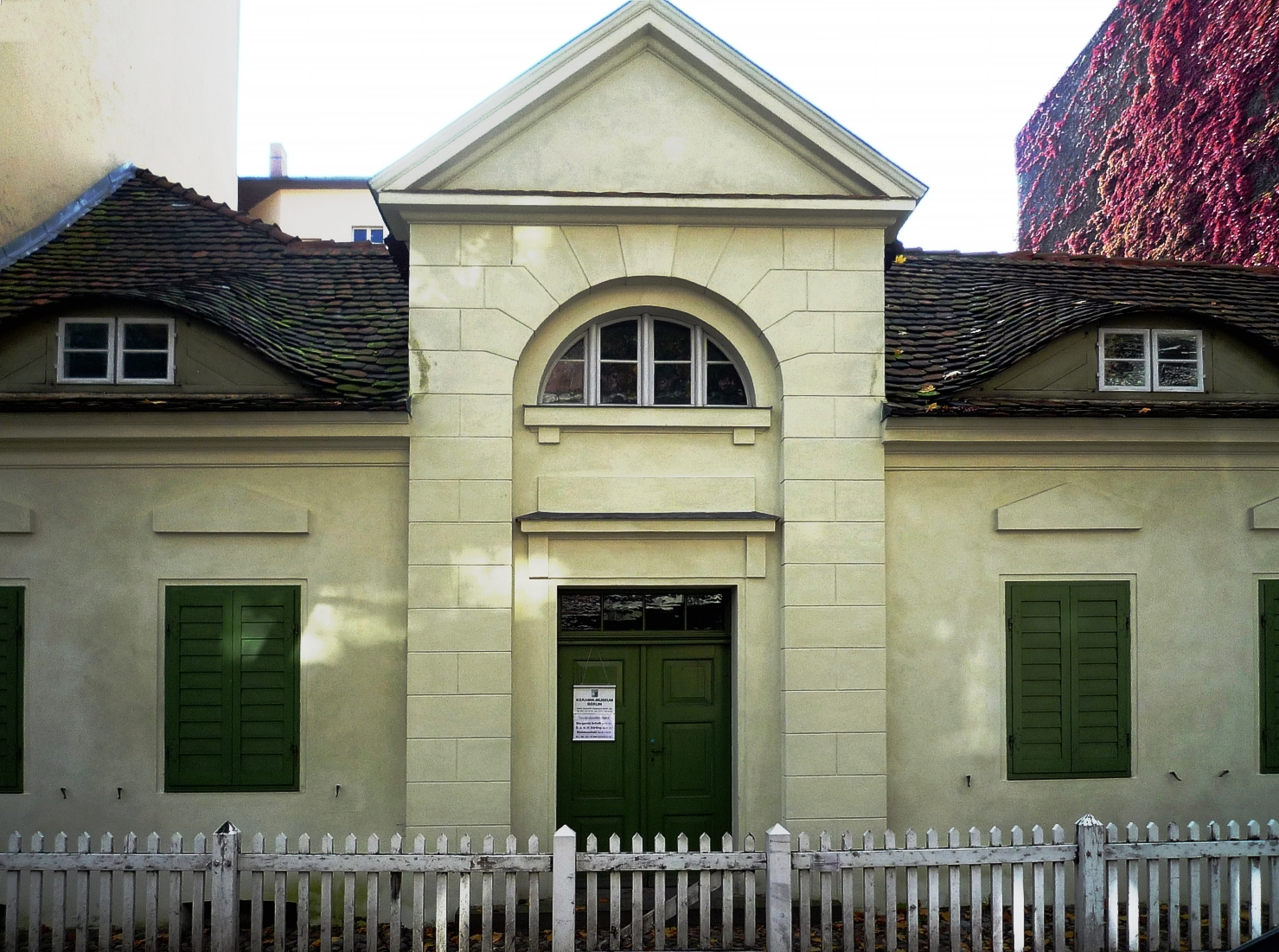
- The museum building in 2011
- Established: 1990
- Location: Schustehrusstrasse 13, 10585 Berlin
- Coordinates: 52°31′01.83″N 13°18′14.34″E
- Type: Art museum
- Collections: Ceramic art
- Director: Heinz-Joachim Theis
- Public transit access: Richard-Wagner-Platz
- Website: www.keramik-museum-berlin.de

The Keramik-Museum Berlin (KMB, Berlin Ceramics Museum) is a ceramic art museum in Berlin. It was established in 1990 and is located in a historic building in the Charlottenburg neighborhood since January 2004. Exhibitions feature design classics and works of famous ceramists.

== History ==
The museum is located in the oldest still existing town house in the old town of Charlottenburg. It was originally constructed in 1712 following plans drawn by Eosander von Göthe, the royal architect of Frederick I of Prussia.

The Senate of Berlin placed the dilapidated building on its list of significant cultural heritage in 1981. On 24 December 1983 the owner illegally tried to demolish the house but was prevented by public outcry. The building was taken over by the district and renovated by the architect Ulli Böhme using 18th century construction materials and methods. The renovation with a classical facade was publicly funded.

== Exhibitions and collection ==
Exhibitions are organized by the Association of Friends of the Berlin Ceramics Museum, which leases the building from the district Charlottenburg-Wilmersdorf. The collection consists mainly of 19th and 20th century objects, including works by Peter Behrens, Charles Crodel, Margarete Heymann, Max Laeuger, Otto Lindig, Hedwig Marquardt and Henry van de Velde.
