= Augusta Kaiser =

German sculptor

- Born: 16 January 1895; Niederbrechen, German Empire
- Died: 27 September 1932 (aged 37); Wiesbaden, Germany
- Known for: Sculpture, ceramic art

Augusta Kaiser (16 January 1895 – 27 September 1932) was a modern German sculptor and ceramic artist who called herself Gust Kaiser from 1922 on. She is also known as Gustl Kaiser in connection to her ceramics work for the Kieler Kunst-Keramik pottery works.

== Life ==
Augusta Theodora Priscilla Kaiser was the daughter of teacher Peter Josef Kaiser and Augusta Schneider. From 1906 her father worked in Wiesbaden, where Augusta graduated school. She graduated with top honors from the Kunstgewerbeschule in Mainz and continued her education at the Academy of Fine Arts, Karlsruhe.

In 1922 she met the painter Hedwig Marquardt who was working at the time as ceramics painter at the Großherzoglichen Majolika-Manufaktur Karlsruhe. As her partner she followed her in April 1924 to Kiel, where they both worked as artists for the Kieler Kunst-Keramik (KKK) until 31 March 1925.

They worked as freelance artists in Biere near Magdeburg in their own "Workshop for Applied Art", which they had to close in 1927 due to financial reasons. Afterwards the couple lived in Hanover, where Marquardt was an art teacher. After a long disease she returned to her parents' house in Wiesbaden, where she died in 1932.

== Kieler Kunst-Keramik AG ==
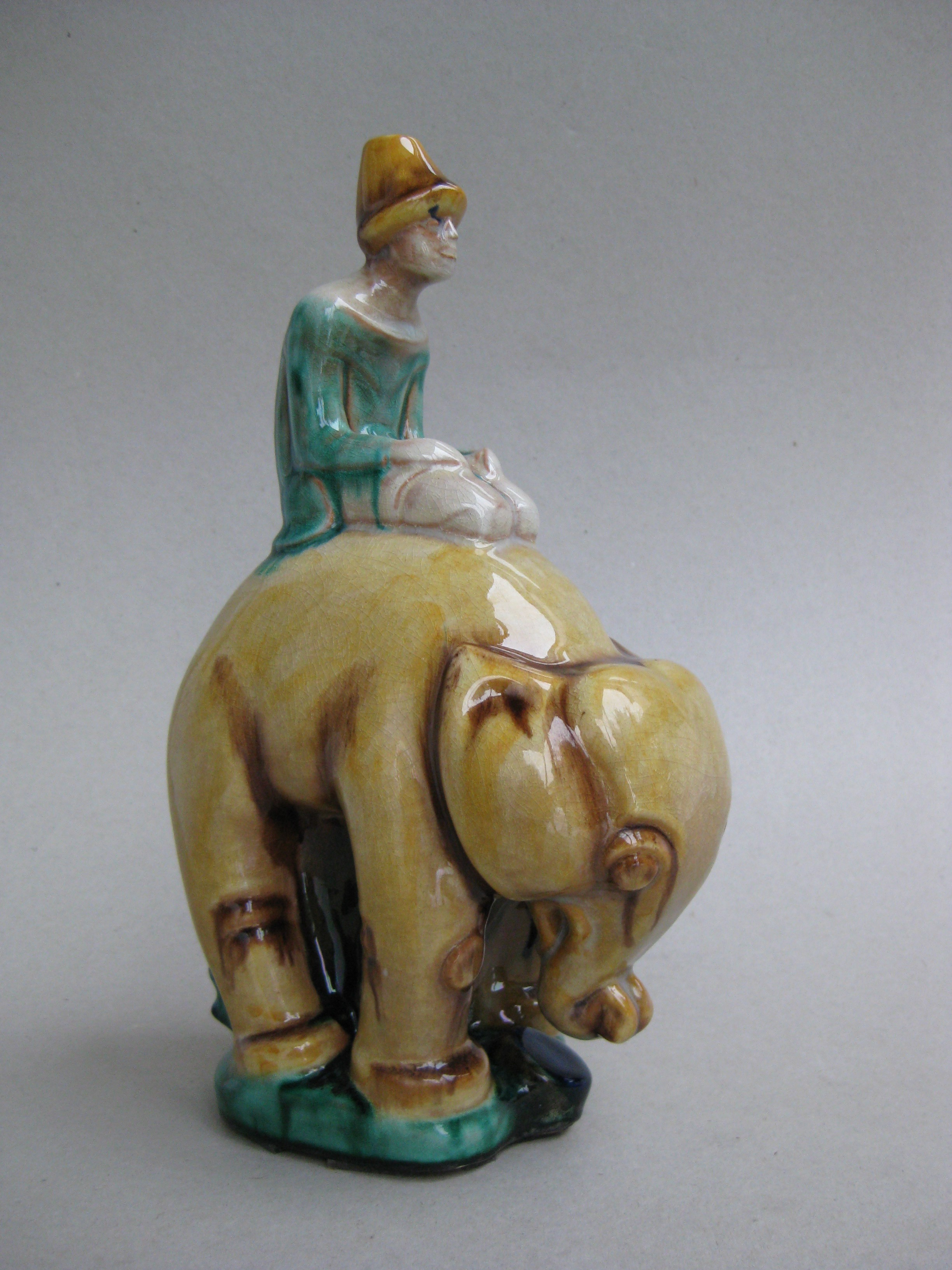
Kieler Kunst-Keramik AG, Elefantenreiter, 1924, height 27,3 cm, Design: Augusta Kaiser

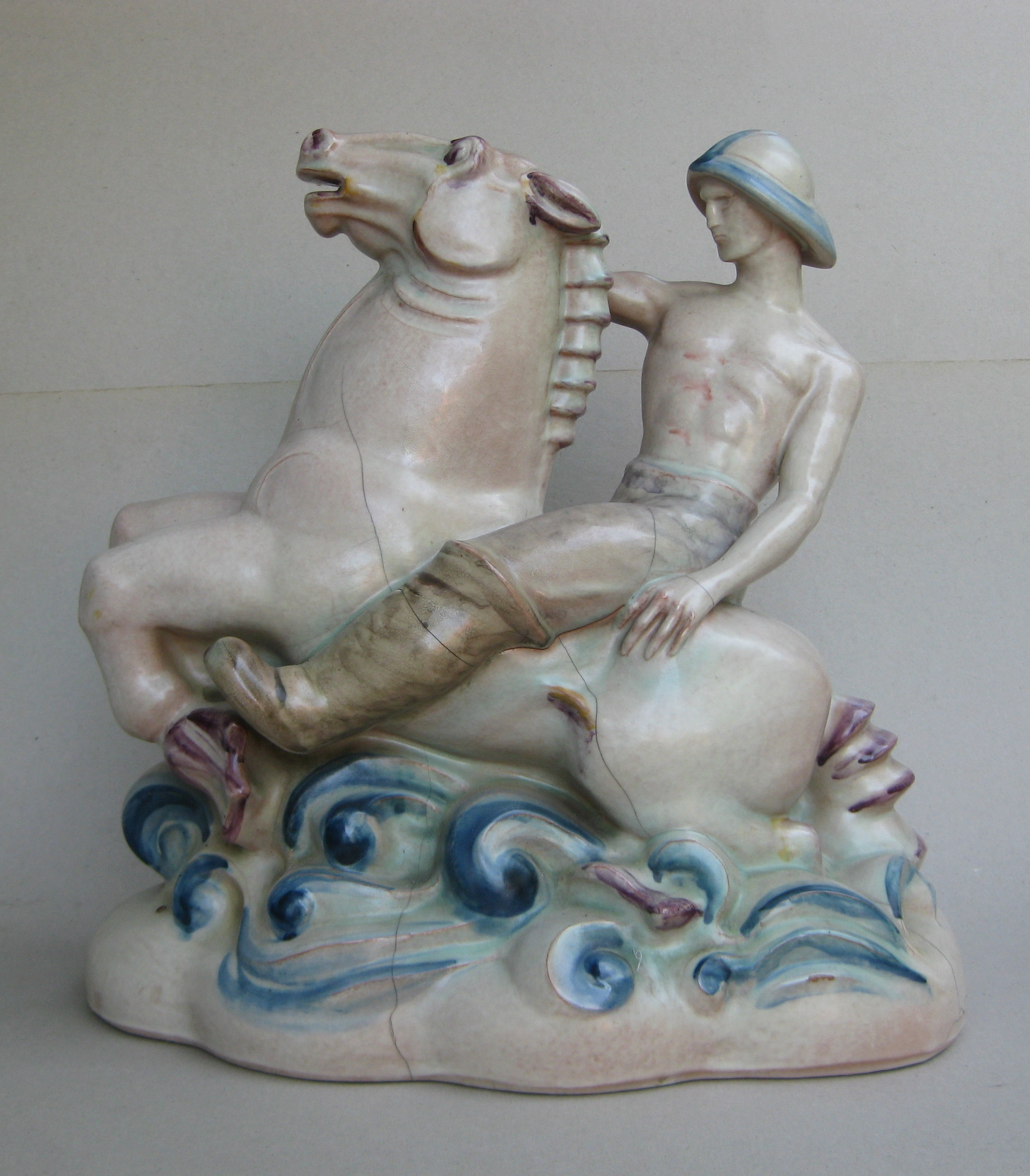
Kieler Kunst-Keramik AG, Meerreiter, 1924, Height 42 cm. Design: Augusta Kaiser

Kaiser was, like Marquardt, one of the first artists of the KKK. She designed the majority of the fine ceramics, small figurines and vessels in the short time where she was associated with KKK, in addition to works for the construction department. All her designs are styled in the expressionist form language of the Art Deco. KKK participated in the Grassi fair in Leipzig in 1924 with art mostly by Kaiser and Marquardt.

Kaisers design for the facade of the Städtische Milchhalle Hirte in Altona, Hamburg is remarkable, but the building was destroyed during the Second World War. Her designs for KKK were highly appreciated already in the contemporary literature, which lauded her as a talented artist.

== Selected literature ==
- Wilhelm Conrad Gomoll: Neues schleswig-holsteinisches Kunstgewerbe. In: Die Buchgemeinde. Vol. 8, 1926, pp. 336–341.
- Wilhelm Conrad Gomoll: Kieler Kunst-Keramik. In: Alexander Koch (ed.): Deutsche Kunst und Dekoration, Illustrierte Monatshefte für moderne Malerei, Plastik, Architektur. Darmstadt 1926, Vol. 58, pp. 389–394, with illustrations
- Thomas Habeck: Die „Kieler Kunstkeramik AG“ und ihre Beziehung zur Baukunst der 20er Jahre in Schleswig-Holstein. Phil. Diss. Univ. Kiel, Kiel 1981, pp. 54, 205–208.
- Joachim and Angelika Konietzny: Augusta Kaiser – die Gustl Kaiser der Kieler Kunstkeramik – und ihr Leben mit Hedwig Marquardt. Afterword: Laurence Marsh. Pansdorf 2011, ISBN 978-3-00-034515-9.
- Joachim and Angelika Konietzny (eds.): Hedwig Marquardt, Augusta Kaiser: ein Künstlerinnenpaar; Briefe an Lotte Boltze aus den Jahren 1922–1931. with an essay by Laurence Marsh. Pansdorf 2013, ISBN 978-3-00-042262-1.
- Bärbel Manitz and Hans-Günther Andresen: Kieler Kunst-Keramik. Neumünster 2004, ISBN 3-529-02662-X.
- Christel Marsh: Ends and Beginnings. London 2004, pp. 277–284, 292–293, ISBN 0-9549274-0-0.
- Richard B. Parkinson: A Little Gay History: Desire and Diversity Across the World. British Museum Press, 2013, ISBN 978-0-7141-5100-7.
- Otto Riedrich: Neue Baukeramik Schleswig-Holsteins mit einem Einblick in die Baukunstgedanken der Gegenwart. In: Schleswig-Holsteinisches Jahrbuch. 1927, pp. 23–38.
- Ernst Sauermann: Neue Wege. In: Schleswig-Holsteinisches Jahrbuch. 1925/26, p. 105 ff.
- Konrad Strauß: Deutsche Keramik der Gegenwart. Halle/Saale 1927, p. 21–22 and illustrations p. 7–8
- Maria-Gesine Thies: Die Kieler Kunst-Keramik AG: Keramik der 1920er Jahre in Kiel. Phil. Diss. Univ. Kiel, Kiel 1988.

== Museum collections ==
- Kieler Stadtmuseum, Kiel (Gustl Kaiser)
- Schleswig-Holsteinisches Landesmuseum Schloss Gottorf, Schleswig (Gustl Kaiser)
- British Museum, London (Augusta Kaiser)
