= Germany: Memories of a Nation =

2014 book by Neil MacGregor

- First edition
- Author: Neil MacGregor
- Language: English
- Subject: History of Germany
- Published: London
- Publisher: Allen Lane; Penguin Books
- Publication date: 2014
- Publication place: United Kingdom
- Pages: 598
- ISBN: 978-0-241-00833-1 (Hardcover)
- Dewey Decimal: 943

Germany: Memories of a Nation is a 2014 book by British historian and then director of the British Museum, Neil MacGregor. The work was published in conjunction with his BBC Radio 4 series and a major exhibition at the British Museum.

== Background and synopsis ==
Germany: Memories of a Nation explores the complex and disjointed history of Europe's foremost power. MacGregor argues that "uniquely for any European country, no coherent, over-arching narrative of Germany's history can be constructed". He also points to the changing borders of the German state: Königsberg, home to the greatest German philosopher, Immanuel Kant, is now Kaliningrad, Russia; Strasbourg, in whose cathedral Johann Wolfgang von Goethe, Germany's greatest writer, discovered the distinctiveness of his country's art and history, now lies within the borders of France. MacGregor focuses on objects and ideas, people and places which still resonate in modern Germany such as Johannes Gutenberg's printing press, the fairytales of the Brothers Grimm and Meissen porcelain.

== Reception ==
David Blackbourn, an academic focusing on German history wrote in The Guardian that MacGregor's book was "immensely readable and sharply intelligent". Blackbourn wrote that MacGregor's choice of objects "serve to illustrate the historic fragmentation of the German lands". Blackbourn concluded that MacGregor "has written a remarkable set of reflections on the objects and places of German memory".

Writing for The Independent Rebecca K Morrison praised Germany: Memories of a Nation. Morrison described the book as "an impeccably erudite cultural history of Germany". Morrison wrote that the "book is immaculately researched, timely and important".

The Economist also received the book positively with the book described as "deeply felt, carefully conceived and an important addition to any consideration of the shape not only of modern Germany but of Europe as a whole".
