= Neil MacGregor =

British art historian (born 1946)

Neil MacGregor OM AO FSA
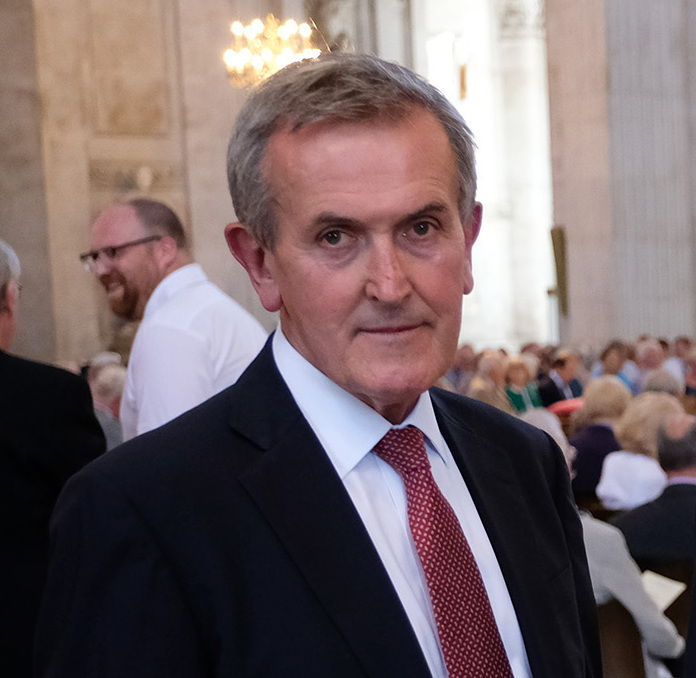
- MacGregor in 2018
- Born: Robert Neil MacGregor; 16 June 1946 (age 80); Glasgow, Scotland
- Education: The Glasgow Academy, Scotland
- Alma mater: New College, Oxford; École Normale Supérieure; University of Edinburgh; Courtauld Institute of Art
- Occupations: Art historian and museum director

Robert Neil MacGregor (born 16 June 1946) is a British art historian and former museum director. He was editor of the Burlington Magazine from 1981 to 1987, then Director of the National Gallery, London, from 1987 to 2002, Director of the British Museum from 2003 to 2015, and founding director of the Humboldt Forum in Berlin until 2018.

== Biography ==
Neil MacGregor was born in Glasgow to two medical doctors, Alexander and Anna MacGregor. He was educated at Glasgow Academy and then read modern languages at New College, Oxford, where he is now an honorary fellow.

The period that followed was spent studying philosophy at the École Normale Supérieure in Paris (coinciding with the events of May 1968), and as a law student at Edinburgh University, where he received the Green Prize. Despite being called to the bar in 1972, MacGregor next decided to take an art history degree. The following year, on a Courtauld Institute (University of London) summer school in Bavaria, the Courtauld's director Anthony Blunt spotted MacGregor and persuaded him to take a master's degree under his supervision. Blunt later considered MacGregor "the most brilliant pupil he ever taught".

From 1975 to 1981, MacGregor taught History of Art and Architecture at the University of Reading. He left to assume the editorship of The Burlington Magazine. He oversaw the transfer of the magazine from the Thomson Corporation to an independent not-for-profit company with charitable status.

=== Directorship of the National Gallery ===
In 1987, MacGregor became director of the National Gallery in London. During his directorship, MacGregor presented three BBC television series on art: Painting the World in 1995, Making Masterpieces, a behind-the-scenes tour of the National Gallery, in 1997 and Seeing Salvation, on the representation of Jesus in western art, in 2000. He declined the offer of a knighthood in 1999, the first director of the National Gallery to do so.

=== Directorship of the British Museum ===
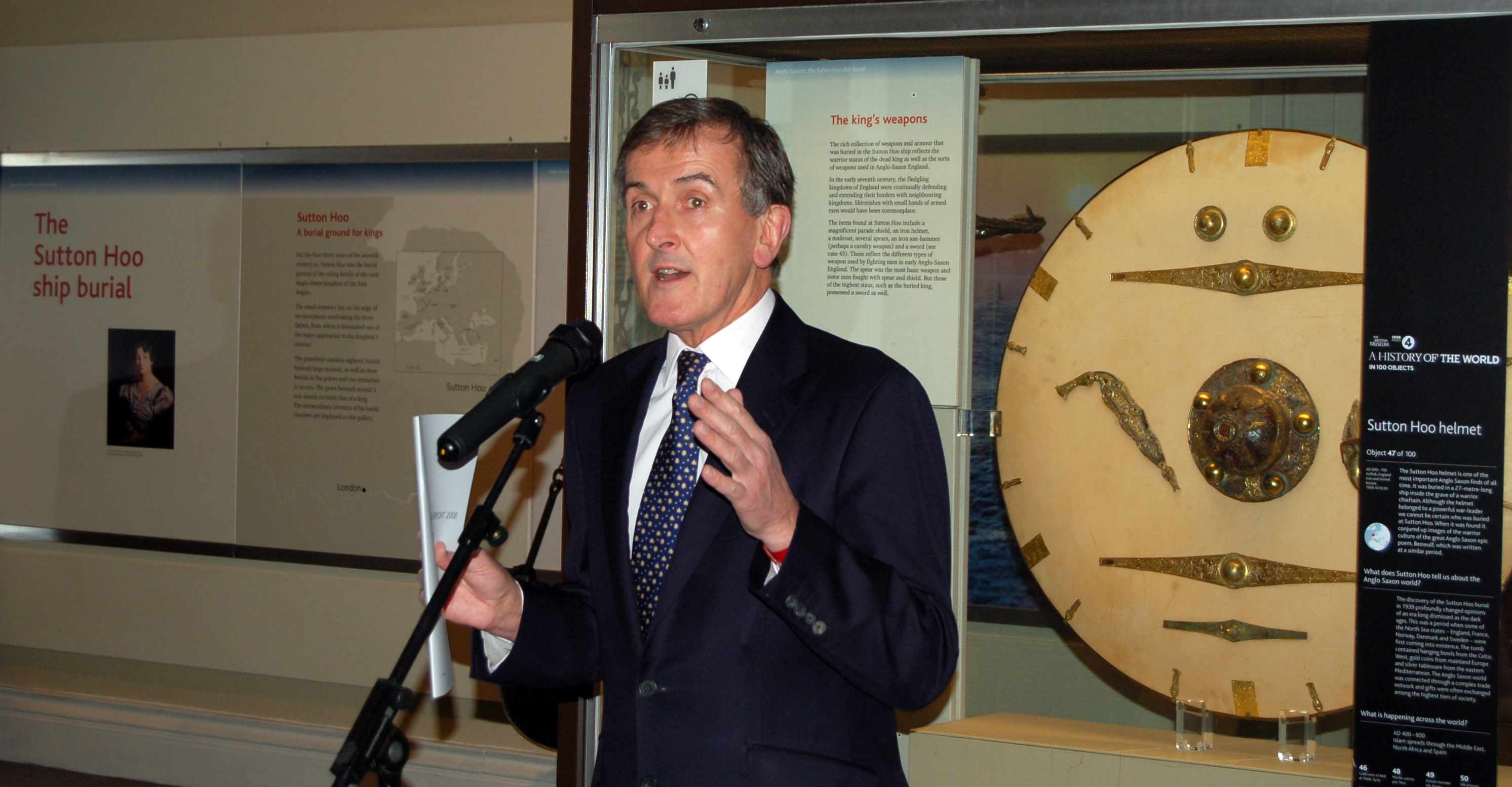
MacGregor in front of a British Museum display on Sutton Hoo in 2010

MacGregor was made director of the British Museum in August 2002, at a time when that institution was £5 million in deficit. He has been lauded for his "diplomatic" approach to the post, though MacGregor rejects this description, stating that "diplomat is conventionally taken to mean the promotion of the interests of a particular state and that is not what we are about at all".

His tenure included exhibitions that were more provocative than the museum had previously shown and some told stories from perspectives that were less Eurocentric than previously, including a project about the Muslim Hajj. He sparked debate with his claim that the ancient Persian empire was greater than Ancient Greece.

In 2010, MacGregor presented a series on BBC Radio 4 and the World Service entitled A History of the World in 100 Objects, based on one hundred artefacts held in the British Museum's collection.

From September 2010 to January 2011 the British Museum lent the ancient Persian Cyrus Cylinder to an exhibition in Tehran, Iran. This was seen by at least a million visitors on the Museum's estimation, more than any loan exhibition to the United Kingdom had attracted since the Treasures of Tutankhamun exhibition in 1972.

Holding tenure when the Acropolis Museum in Athens was completed, MacGregor followed previous Directors in arguing against returning the sculptures from the Parthenon (the "Elgin Marbles") to Greece. A poll in 2014 suggested that more British people (37%) supported the marbles' restoration to Greece than opposed it (23%). MacGregor argued that it is the British Museum's duty to "preserve the universality of the marbles, and to protect them from being appropriated as a nationalistic political symbol", and that "there is no legal system in Europe that would challenge the [British Museum's] legal title" to the works. The legal basis of various Ottoman documents, now lost, to which the British Museum has traditionally appealed in order to claim ownership of the sculptures is disputed. Under the directorship of MacGregor, the Museum rejected UNESCO mediation.

In January 2008, MacGregor was appointed chairman of the World Collections programme, for training international curators at British museums. The exhibition The First Emperor, focussing on Qin Shi Huang and including a small number of his Terracotta Warriors, was mounted in 2008 in the British Museum Reading Room. That year MacGregor was invited to succeed Philippe de Montebello as the Director of the Metropolitan Museum of Art in New York. He declined the offer as the Metropolitan charges its visitors for entry and is thus "not a public institution".

As of 2015, MacGregor was paid a salary of between £190,000 and £194,999 by the British Museum, making him one of the 328 most highly paid people in the British public sector at that time. MacGregor retired from the post in December 2015 and was succeeded in spring 2016 by Hartwig Fischer, till then the director of the Staatliche Kunstsammlungen Dresden ("Dresden State Art Collections").

=== Directorship of the Humboldt Forum ===
On 8 April 2015, MacGregor announced his retirement as Director of the British Museum. It was announced that MacGregor would become founding director and head of the management committee of the Humboldt Forum in Berlin, and that he would make recommendations to the German government on how the future museum could draw on the resources of the Berlin collections to "become a place where different narratives of world cultures can be explored and debated". The archaeologist Hermann Parzinger and the art historian Horst Bredekamp were the co-directors of the management committee. One of MacGregor's proposals was to make admission to the museum free of charge, based on the model of the British Museum. In 2018, MacGregor left the post.

== Media projects ==
MacGregor has made many programmes for British television and radio. In the year 2000, he presented on television Seeing Salvation, about how Jesus had been depicted in famous paintings. More recently, he has made important contributions on BBC Radio 4, including A History of the World in 100 Objects and, in 2012, a series of fifteen-minute programmes after The World at One called Shakespeare's Restless World, discussing themes in the plays of William Shakespeare.

In September 2014 UK domestic transmission started of his similarly formatted series Germany: Memories of a Nation on BBC Radio 4, with a major supporting exhibition at the British Museum. This series did not limit itself to physical objects but places of memory, including for example the forest.

In 2017, MacGregor hosted a BBC Radio Four series Living with the Gods, on expressions of religious faith, liaising with Sabyasachi Mukherjee, Director of the Chhatrapati Shivaji Maharaj Vastu Sangrahalaya in Mumbai, on the presentation of world cultures.

At the beginning of 2019, MacGregor presented a programme called "As Others See Us" on BBC Radio Four. This programme looked at how his own country (the United Kingdom) was seen by other countries around the world.

In 2021, he gave a series of lectures at the “Chaire du Louvre” in Paris. The following year, MacGregor presented the BBC Radio 4 series The Museums That Make Us in which he visited local, regional, and city museums throughout the UK.

== Personal life ==
MacGregor was listed in The Independent's 2007 list of "most influential gay people" and was single as of January 2010.

On 4 November 2010, MacGregor was appointed to the Order of Merit by Queen Elizabeth II. On 25 March 2013 MacGregor was appointed an Honorary Officer of the Order of Australia (AO) by the Governor-General of Australia Quentin Bryce, "for service to promoting Australia and Australian art in the United Kingdom".

In April 2023, MacGregor was one of the 22 personal guests at the ceremony in which former German Chancellor Angela Merkel was decorated with the Grand Cross of the Order of Merit for special achievement by President Frank-Walter Steinmeier at Schloss Bellevue in Berlin.

== Awards ==
- 2010 International Folkwang-Prize
- 2015 Friedrich-Gundolf-Preis from the Deutsche Akademie für Sprache und Dichtung for A History of the World in 100 Objects and Germany: Memories of a Nation
- 2015 Nayef Al-Rodhan Prize, from the British Academy for A History of the World in 100 Objects and Germany: Memories of a Nation

== Publications ==
- A Victim of Anonymity: The Master of the Saint Bartholomew Altarpiece. Walter Neurath Memorial Lectures. Thames & Hudson. 1994. ISBN 9780500550267.
- Seeing Salvation: Images of Christ in Art. Yale University Press. 2000. ISBN 9780300084788.
- A History of the World in 100 Objects. Allen Lane. 2011. ISBN 9781846144134.
- Shakespeare's Restless World: An Unexpected History in Twenty Objects. Penguin. 2014. ISBN 978-0718195700.
- Germany: Memories of a Nation. Allen Lane. 2014. ISBN 9780241008331.
- Living with the Gods: On Beliefs and Peoples. Alfred A. Knopf. 2018. ISBN 9780525521464.

== See also ==
- List of directors of the British Museum
