= Hedwig Bollhagen =

German ceramicist in the Bauhaus style

- Hedwig Bollhagen
- Born: 10 November 1907; Hanover, Germany
- Died: 8 June 2001 (aged 93); Oberkrämer, Germany
- Known for: Ceramic pots
- Website: hedwig-bollhagen.com

Hedwig Bollhagen (born in Hanover on 10 November 1907; died in Marwitz on 8 June 2001) was a German ceramicist and co-founder of the HB Workshops for Ceramics. A museum dedicated to her work has been opened near Berlin.

== Life ==
Hedwig Bollhagen was raised in a one-parent family in Hanover, where she attended a girl's secondary school. After graduating from this school in 1924, she completed an internship in a pottery in Großalmerode in the same year. After her guest studies at the Staatliche Kunstakademie (State Art Academy) in Kassel, she studied at the Fachschule Höhr-Grenzhausen, a technical school for ceramics, under Eduard Berdel and Hermann Bollenbach from spring of 1925 until summer of 1927. In 1926, she became a trainee in the Hamelner Töpferei (pottery workshop) of Gertrud Kraut in Hameln. From 1927 to 1931, she worked as a designer and head of the painting department at the earthenware factories Steingutfabriken Velten-Vordamm in Velten.

After their closure due to a drop in exports as a result of the Great Depression, she began traveling: she first worked at the State Majolica Factory in Karlsruhe, then at the Rosenthal factories in Coburg, the workshop of Wilhelm Kagel in Garmisch-Partenkirchen (until the spring of 1932) and finally, as a "shop girl" in the "Kunst und Handwerk" ("Art and Craft") sales gallery led by Tilly Prill-Schloemann and Bruno Paul in Berlin until February 1933. Until October 1933, she worked in the glazing and painting department of J. Kalscheuer Cie. Steinzeugwerke m.b.H. in Frechen.

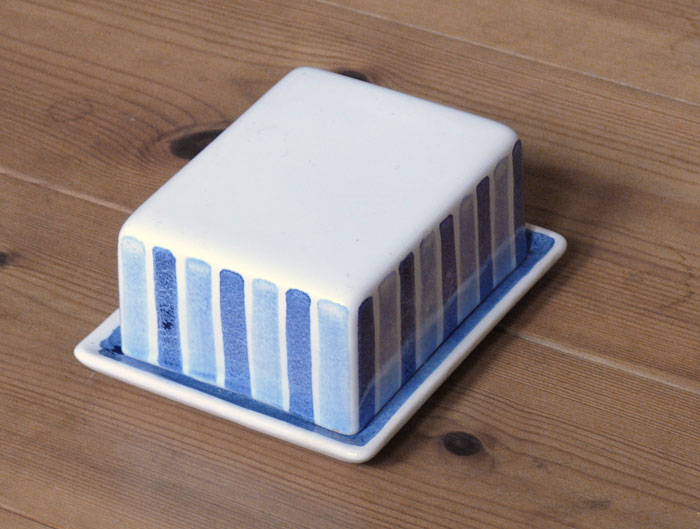
A butter dish shows the style of her work.

When ceramist Nora Herz, who was based in Cologne, learned of the failed resettlement of the Haël Workshops for Artistic Ceramics, founded by ceramist Margarete Heymann and her husband Gustav Loebenstein, Hedwig Bollhagen was able to found the new HB-Werkstätten für Keramik GmbH (HB Workshops for Ceramics) in the old ceramics factory in Velten in 1934 with the help of German politician Heinrich Schild and the participation of Margarete Heymann and Nora Herz. They established themselves with the aid of ceramics master Thoma Countess Grote as a commercial assistant and developer – she had developed glazes for Charles Crodel - and former employees of the ceramics workshop of Bauhaus under Gerhard Marcks such as Theodor Bogler and Werner Burri. The ceramic workshop had emerged from the Steingutfabriken Velten-Vordamm GmbH stoneware factories which were shut down in 1931.

In 1935, Charles Crodel added the field of building ceramics to the company and, at the same time, brought to bear his industrial experience in decor development that he gained in the United Lusatian Glassworks when working together with Wilhelm Wagenfeld. In 1939, Hedwig Bollhagen passed her master exam with a vessel painted by Charles Crodel. She became a ceramics master and was able to free the business from the grip of the German Labour Front (DAF), the National Socialist trade union organisation.

In 1946, after the end of the Second World War, Heinrich Schild, the main opponent of the DAF and co-founder and unpaid manager of the HB-Werkstätten, returned from the Soviet occupation zone to the Rhineland in West Germany, and Hedwig Bollhagen then assumed sole responsibility for the management of the HB-Werkstätten. In 1972, the workshops were nationalised, but even during the twenty years until it was finally re-privatised in 1992, Bollhagen remained its artistic director and continued to work there until shortly before her death.

Her successor as artistic director was Heidi Manthey, a former pupil of Bollhagen's friend Charles Crodel, who Hedwig Bollhagen had worked with since founding the company.

== Grave ==
Hedwig Bollhagen was buried in the municipal cemetery of the Stöcken district of Hanover.

== Perception ==
Hedwig Bollhagen achieved international fame through her simple, timeless everyday crockery, which, in their form and décor, succeeded in achieving an informal combination of peasant tradition and Bauhaus aesthetics. She herself said: "Art? Oh yes, that's what some people call it. I make plates, cups and jugs." Or more succinctly: "They're just pots!"

Bollhagen's work was criticised by the East German head of state Walter Ulbricht, who considered her designs too formal and cosmopolitan.

== Legacy ==
Bollhagen was one of Germany's top ceramists despite her own view that "they were just pots".

Bollhager's ceramic company, HB-Werkstätten für Keramik, is still in operation. In 2004, the estate of Hedwig Bollhagen was entered into the list of monuments of the Federal State of Brandenburg as a movable monument under the auspices of the Brandenburg State Office for Monument Protection.

For the benefit of this academic estate, her heirs established the Hedwig Bollhagen Foundation as a fiducial foundation in the charge of the German Foundation for Monument Protection. It was supposed to be exhibited in the "Im Güldenen Arm" museum building in Potsdam as of summer of 2008. However, the opening of the planned museum was postponed after differences in opinion between the Hedwig Bollhagen Foundation and Hedwig Bollhagen Society on the one hand and the city of Potsdam on the other.

Triggered by an article in the rbb magazine Kontraste, there was an intensified media debate in early 2008 regarding the extent to which Hedwig Bollhagen was the deliberate beneficiary of the so-called "Aryanization" of the Haël workshops. The Jewish Claims Conference continues to abide by the 1981 compensation regime and confirms that the State Office responsible for settling still open property issues has denied that the sale was related to the persecution rife at the time.

Potsdam's Lord Mayor Jann Jakobs commissioned a study at the Centre for Contemporary History of Potsdam (ZZF) to examine whether a planned permanent exhibition of ceramics by Hedwig Bollhagen could still be held in the municipal "Haus im Güldenen Arm". Historian Simone Ladwig-Winters, who was awarded her doctorate for a dissertation on the "Aryanization" of Berlin department stores, published it on 14 July 2008. In that report she came to the conclusion that Hedwig Bollhagen was neither a supporter nor patron of National Socialism as the rbb magazine Kontraste had shown. Although she had benefited economically from the general anti-Jewish conditions of the National Socialist establishment phase, she had not exploited them deliberately to her advantage. Jakobs thereupon gave his consent for a permanent exhibition of Bollhagen's ceramics, which would also be supplemented with the discussion of their time after 1933.

In 2002, a newly built grammar school was named after her in the Brandenburg town of Velten. In Hanover, in the district of Seelhorst, a street has borne her name since 2009.

== Awards ==
- Gold Medal Exposition Internationale des Arts et Techniques dans la Vie Moderne Paris 1937
- 1938: Bronze Medal International Craft Exhibition Berlin
- 1957: Gold Medal, Munich
- 1958: Honorary Certificate of the Brussels World's Fair
- 1962: Gold Medal in Prague
- 1966: Theodor-Fontane-Preis des Bezirkes Potsdam (Theodor-Fontane-Prize of the District of Potsdam)
- 1985: Patriotic Order of Merit in Gold
- 1991: Honorary Exhibition at Antiqua in Berlin
- 1992: Culture Prize of the District of Oranienburg
- 1994: Honorary Exhibition of the State of Berlin by the Friends of the Ceramics Museum Berlin
- 1996: Order of Merit of Berlin, Berlin
- 1997: Order of Merit of the Federal Republic of Germany 1st Class (9 October 1997)

== Exhibitions ==
- Berlin ehrt Hedwig Bollhagen (Berlin Honours Hedwig Bollhagen). 8 October to 13 November 1994. Guest exhibition of the Ceramics Museum Berlin in the Martin Gropius Building Berlin
- Hedwig Bollhagen – Unikate (Hedwig Bollhagen – Unique Pieces). 1 to 31 May 1996. Galerie Theis Berlin.
- Hedwig Bollhagen. Ein Leben für die Keramik (Hedwig Bollhagen. A Life for Ceramics). 22 June 2007 to 13 January 2008. Museum of Brandenburg-Prussian History, Kutschstall am Neuer Markt, Potsdam
- Hedwig Bollhagen (1907–2001) zum 100. Geburtstag (Hedwig Bollhagen (1907–2001) on Her 100th Birthday). 26 August to 31 December 2007. Keramik-Museum Berlin
- Töppe, Tassen, Humpen für VEB Stadtgrün u. a. – Präsent- und Auftragskeramik aus den HB-Werkstätten Marwitz (Pots, cups, tankards for VEB Stadtgrün among other – gift and commissioned ceramics from HB-Werkstätten Marwitz) 3 November 2007 to 3 February 2008. Ofen- und Keramikmuseum Velten, Wilhelmstrasse 32, Velten (Mark)
- Hedwig Bollhagen – Keramik (Hedwig Bollhagen – Ceramics). Special exhibition, 12 April to 21 September 2008, Ceramics Museum Bürgel
- Hedwig Bollhagen. Baukeramik und Denkmalpflege (Hedwig Bollhagen. Building Ceramics and Monument Preservation). 11 February to 13 August 2012. Hedwig Bollhagen Gesellschaft as a guest in the Ceramics Museum Berlin

== Literature ==
- Gudrun Gorka-Reimus (Ed.): Hedwig Bollhagen. Ein Leben für die Keramik. With a foreword by Angela Merkel. Deutsche Stiftung Denkmalschutz. Monumente Publikationen, Bonn 2007. ISBN 978-3-936942-85-9
- Ein fairer Grundstückspreis. (memento dated 27 September 2007 in Internet Archive) Lothar de Maiziére on the history of the Hedwig Bollhagen workshop. In: Maerkische Allgemeine. Potsdam, 14 June 2007.
- Ursula Hudson-Wiedenmann: Ein fairer Preis? (memento dated 29 September 2007 in the Internet Archive) On the history of the HB workshops in Marwitz – a reply. In: Maerkische Allgemeine. Potsdam, 16 June 2007.
- Andreas Heger: Keramik zum Gebrauch – Hedwig Bollhagen und die HB-Werkstätten für Keramik. VDG, Weimar 2005. ISBN 3-89739-491-X (ca. 170 pp. Commented self-portrayal The ceramicist Hedwig Bollhagen on herself and list of mass-produced tableware forms – without decorations and with erroneous dating).
- Brief biography on: Bollhagen, Hedwig. In: Wer war wer in der DDR? 5th edition. Volume 1, Ch. Links, Berlin 2010, ISBN 978-3-86153-561-4.
- Heinz-Joachim Theis: Hedwig Bollhagen (1907–2001). Zier- und Gebrauchskeramik. Selbstverlag, Berlin, 2012
- Ofen- und Keramikmuseum Velten: Vollendung des Einfachen. Hedwig Bollhagen wird neunzig. Velten 1997.
