= Heinrich Schild =

German politician

Heinrich Schild (22 October 1895 – 18 February 1978) was a German politician. He was a member of the German Party (DP), and later joined the Christian Democratic Union of Germany (CDU).

== Life and career ==
Heinrich Schild was born in Elberfeld to a family of craftsmen. After gaining a degree in economics, followed by a doctorate in Cologne in 1921, he started work in 1922 for the Reich Association of German Skilled Crafts and Trades, which had been founded in October 1919 in Hanover. He was a member of the National Socialist German Workers' Party and, from the end of March 1933 to the end of September 1934, he was General Secretary of the German Skilled Crafts and Trades Association in Berlin; in this role, he fought off the attack of the German Labour Front (DAF) made on the basis of the “Law on the Preparation of the Organic Development of the German Economy” of February 1934. Schild's success in the power struggle between the skilled crafts and trades and the DAF led to his exclusion from the party.

Going back to 1931, he had supported the ceramics workers who had been affected by the bankruptcy of the Velten-Vordamm stoneware factories and the closure of the Haël Workshops for Artistic Ceramics, paving the way for the founding of the HB Workshops for Ceramics in the former cocklestove factory in Marwitz (Brandenburg) in May 1934. He provided the start-up capital and worked without pay as managing director. The transformation of the business at his behest into a German Commercial Partnership (OHG) in 1938 and Hedwig Bollhagen's retrospective completion of her master tradesman examinations further protected the ceramic crafts and trades from the attacks of the German Labour Front.

In 1946, Schild left the former Soviet zone of occupation and went to live in West Germany. From 1949 to 1958, he was the General Manager of the State Federation of Skilled Crafts and Trades Associations of NRW e.V. In addition to this, he was General Secretary of the Rhineland-Westphalia Skilled Crafts and Trades Association and managing director of the North Rhine-Westphalia State Association of the German medium-sized business sector, a lobbying association for the interests of small and medium-sized businesses. Following this, he became self-employed and worked as a business consultant.

== Political party ==
Schild was a member of the Germany Party (DP) from 1953 onwards and he left the party on 1 July 1960. On 20 September 1960, he joined the CDU.

== Member of the German Parliament ==
Schild was a member of the German Bundestag from 1953 until 1961. From 15 December 1958 until 29 November 1961, he was also a member of the European Parliament.

From 1961 until 1969, he was a member of the regional parliament in the Oberberg district, and in 1963/64 as the chairman of the CDU parliamentary group.

== Public office ==
From 1964 until 1969, Schild was Head of the District Authority of the Oberberg district.

== Publications ==
- Chronicle of the Communities of Nümbrecht and Marienberghausen. Nümbrecht 1977.

== Literature ==
- Rudolf Vierhaus and Ludolf Herbst (publishers): Biographical handbook of the members of the German Bundestag 1949–2002. Volume 2, N–Z, Saur, Munich 2002, ISBN 3-598-23782-0, page 738
- Rüdiger Hachtmann: The Economic Empire of the German Labour Front 1933–1945. Wallstein publishing house, Göttingen, 2012, ISBN 978-3835310377
