= Johann Friedrich Adolf von der Marwitz =

Prussian general during the epoch of Frederick the Great

Johann Friedrich Adolf von der Marwitz (24 March 1723 – 14 December 1781) was a Prussian general during the epoch of Frederick the Great.

NOTE: original author included no citations; if you can, please help improve this article

== Biography ==
Born on his family's estate, Friedersdorf, near Seelow, district of Küstrin; Marwitz entered the cavalry regiment Gensdarmes at the age of 17 and eventually rose to the role of commander. In the Battle of Zorndorf he led his regiment with distinction and was promoted to major and awarded the highest decoration of Prussia, the Pour le Mérite. In the battle of Hochkirch he fought and led his troops with success. Near the end of the Seven Years' War Prussian troops conquered the elector of Saxony's hunting lodge, Hubertusburg, near Leipzig.

The castle was given to Marwitz by the Prussian king Friedrich II, together with the order to sack it thoroughly. This was intended to be King Frederick's revenge for the sacking of Charlottenburg Palace by Russian, Austrian, and Saxon troops in 1760, depriving him of his highly beloved collection of antiques. Given the order to sack the castle, von der Marwitz replied to his king, "This is unbefitting to an officer of His Majesty" ("es würde sich allenfalls für den Offizier eines Freibataillons schicken, nicht aber für einen Kommandeur Seiner Majestät Gensdarmes") and resigned his commission.

Frederick then gave the castle to his adjutant Quintus Icilius, who finally sacked and sold it. Several years later, von der Marwitz won most of the famous Hubertusburg books collection playing cards against Quintus Icilius.

After an interval of several years, Marwitz eventually served in the War of the Bavarian Succession as a Major Kriegskommissar with the king's brother Prince Henry of Prussia. Near the end of his life he was promoted to Major General. Upon the distribution of his parents' estate he was assigned his family's stately home, Friedersdorf. However, he paid little attention to it, instead staying in Berlin, with his beloved books and paintings. He died, as his brother writes, "completely insolvent", but as an "extremely honest and widely tributed soldier, an honourable and very well-educated man of the world, a great friend of literature and arts".

His tombstone bears the following inscription, engraved by his nephew Friedrich August Ludwig von der Marwitz: "Chose disgrace where obedience did not bring honour" ("Wählte Ungnade, wo Gehorsam nicht Ehre brachte.")

Johann Friedrich Adolf von der Marwitz died unmarried in Berlin in 1781.

== Legacy ==
"Chose disgrace where obedience does not bring honour" This gravestone inscription is still a widely known phrase in Germany, to denote an example of a man who decided against his orders when he judged them as unjust. Also the 20 July plot conspirers referred to him to show that every single man is responsible to his conscience first, and only secondly to his political leader.

== Literature (German) ==
- Günter de Bruyn: Mein Brandenburg, Frankfurt/M 1993
- Friedrich August Ludwig von der Marwitz, Nachrichten aus meinem Leben, (Hg.: Günter de Bruyn), Berlin 1989
