= War commissary =

Military official

A war commissary or armed forces commissary (German: Kriegskommissar, French:commissaire des armées) is a military official responsible for supplying military arms and provisions, and sometimes in charge of the military budget and conscription. The rank is used, or has been used, in the Danish Army, Norwegian Army, Prussian Army, Swedish Army, French Army and Soviet army.

== Russia ==
In the Soviet Union, the war commissary was a direct political representative of the Soviet Government with the army.

== Sweden ==
- Hans Detterman Cronman (1590–c1645)

== Prussia ==
The title was later called the Prussian Minister of War in 1808

- Wilhelm von Rath (1585–1641)
- Wedego von Bonin
- Johann Friedrich Adolf von der Marwitz (1723–1781)

== See also ==
- Political commissar
- Prussian Minister of War
- United States Secretary of Defense
