= Charles Crodel =

German painter and stained glass artist

- Born: September 16, 1894; Marseille, France
- Died: November 11, 1973 (aged 79); Munich, West Germany
- Known for: Painting, Stained glass art

Charles Crodel (September 16, 1894 – November 11, 1973) was a German painter and stained glass artist.

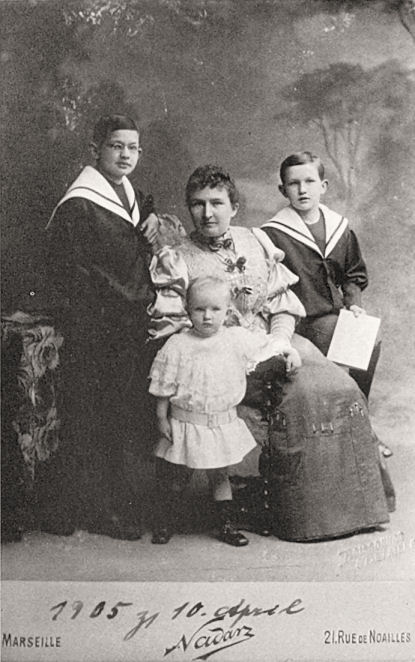
Charles Crodel with a scetch-book, photograph by Nadar, Marseille 1905

== Life ==
Crodel was born in Marseille, he studied in 1914 with Richard Riemerschmid, one of the founders of the Deutscher Werkbund, at the Munich Kunstgewerbeschule and since 1915 at the University of Jena, while he became painter and lithographer. He was a member of the Berlin Secession and of the executive board of the Jena art-union and became a close friend of Gerhard Marcks. In 1923, the German National Gallery of Art at Berlin and later the Bibliothèque Nationale at Paris bought first his woodcuts and lithographies. A mural in the University of Jena, another in the Weimar Schlossmuseum, bought by Wilhelm Köhler, and a third in Erfurt remain of that time.

From 1927 on, Crodel taught printing and monumental painting at the "Burg Giebichenstein", the Academy of Arts and Crafts in Halle until 1933 when he was dismissed, but he continued to teach in a private circle at the house of Paul Frankl. In these years, Crodels murals in Halle and the murals dedicated to Goethe in 1932 at Bad Lauchstädt were destroyed in summer 1933 and had been ejected from the gleichgeschaltet (Nazi sympathetic Arts organisation) group for creating Degenerate art. At this time many refugees brought Crodels paintings and prints, which now are found at Louisville, The North Carolina Museum of Art, Raleigh, the Virginia Museum of Fine Arts and the Luther College, Decorah.

The following years Crodel found new fields of work. He designed glass decoration in Industry (together with Wilhelm Wagenfeld), and he explored pottery decoration together with Hedwig Bollhagen, while Elisabeth Crodel completed embroidery. Bollhagen with the Jewish artist Nora Herz had acquired a pottery business from Margarete Heymann to revitalize the old factory near Velten, to give work for Theodor Bogler, Werner Burri, Thoma Gräfin Grote and others also from the pottery workshop of the Bauhaus at Dornburg, like Heymann. Bollhagen worked closely with Crodel. Crodel's friendship was said to be important to Bollhagen. Crodel also began to paint stained-glass and to design mosaics.

In 1945, Crodel again taught at Halle, but also at the Berlin Academy of Arts and Dresden, and from 1952 at the Academy of Fine Arts, Munich, which had been brought together with the Munich Kunstgewerbeschule in 1947. He also became a member of the renewed Deutscher Künstlerbund and Deutscher Werkbund.

From 1958 on Crodel also several times was invited as visiting professor to the Penn State and Louisville Universities. Among his students were Bob Thompson and Sam Gilliam.

== Stained glass ==
Crodel's stained-glass windows are found in Germany and in Sweden. Beautiful examples are found in the Frankfurt city churches, St. Catherine's Church, Frankfurt, Alsfeld, Erfurt Cathedral, Kaulsdorf (Berlin), Königs Wusterhausen, Heinersdorf, Halberstadt Cathedral, St. Jacobi, Hamburg, St. Mary's Church, Fuhlsbüttel, Hamburg, St. Matthew's Church, Hamburg, St. Michael's Church, Hildesheim, St. John's Church, Lüneburg, Schmalkalden.

Returning from a session of the Berlin Academy of Arts, Crodel died in 1973 in Munich, at the age of 79.

== Exhibitions ==
University of Louisville: Allen R. Hite Art Institute: Paintings and Graphic Work by Charles Crodel, October 6–28, 1958. Introduction by Justus Bier and Senta Bier.

== Portraits ==
- Walter Hasenclever, lithography, 1920.
- Theodor Däubler, lithography, 1921.
- Wilhelm Worringer and Herbert Koch, woodcut, 1922.
- Die Töpferin Marguerite Friedlaender, painting, Berliner Sezession, 64. Ausstellung: Künstler unter sich. Malerei. Plastik. April / März 1931.

== Bibliography ==
- Carl Crodel. Malerei – Graphik – Kunsthandwerk. (Staatliche Galerie Moritzburg Halle, 27. Juli – 10. Oktober 1982, Galerie am Fischmarkt Erfurt, 19. Dezember 1982 – 13. Februar 1983). Staatliche Galerie Moritzburg, Halle 1982.
- Cornelius Steckner: "Ch. Crodel. Kunst, Handwerk, Industrie". Kulturamt der Stadt Hannover, Hannover 1983.
- Cornelius Steckner: Charles Crodel. Das graphische Werk. Ketterer, München 1985.
- Horst Ludwig: Münchner Maler im 19./20. Jahrhundert. Vol. 5: Achmann-Kursell. Bruckmann, München 1993, ISBN 3-7654-1805-6, S. 157–160.
- Katja Schneider: Charles Crodel – Kunsthandwerk. Zum 100. Geburtstag. Staatliche Galerie Moritzburg Halle, 16. September – 27. November 1994. Staatliche Galerie Moritzburg, Halle 1994, ISBN 3-86105-116-8.
