= Friedrich August von der Marwitz =

Prussian nobleman, officer, and reform opponent

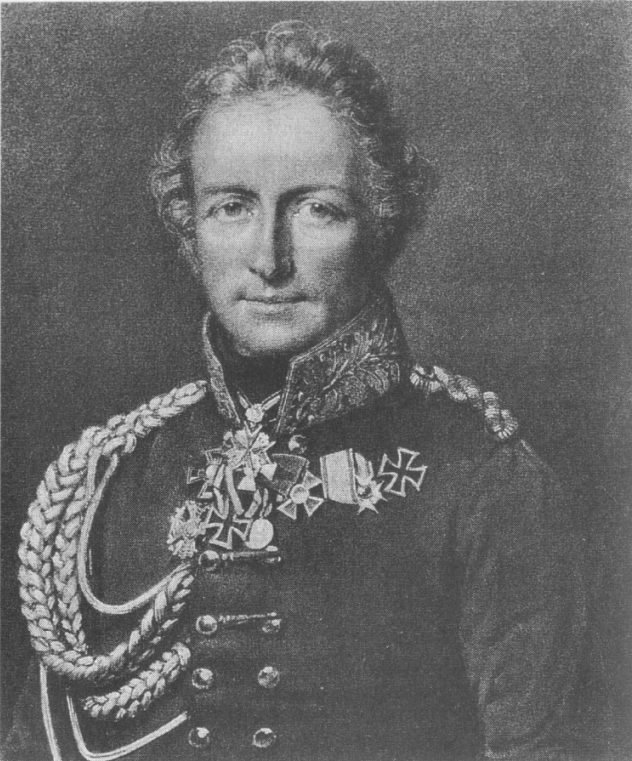
Friedrich August Ludwig von der Marwitz

Friedrich August Ludwig von der Marwitz (29 May 1777, in Berlin – 6 December 1837, in Friedersdorf) was a Prussian nobleman, officer, and opponent of the Prussian reforms of Heinrich Friedrich Karl vom Stein.

== Biography ==
He married twice, first to Countess Caroline Franziska von Brühl (* 23. March 1783; † 28. March 1804), with whom he had a daughter. His second wife, Charlotte née Gräfin von Moltke (1780–1848) gave birth to nine children, one of whom died. They had three sons and five daughters. Their oldest daughter Karoline Franziska (* 28. February 1804; † 1888) married in 1824 Albert von Arnstedt (1794–1875), a grandson from Adam Friedrich von Arnstedt.

== Further Readings ==
- Beck, Hermann. “The Social Policies of Prussian Officials: The Bureaucracy in a New Light.” The Journal of Modern History 64, no. 2 (1992): 263–98. .
- Berdahl, Robert M. The Politics of the Prussian Nobility: The Development of a Conservative Ideology, 1770-1848. Princeton University Press, 1988. .
- Berdahl, Robert M. “The Stα̈nde and the Origins of Conservatism in Prussia.” Eighteenth-Century Studies 6, no. 3 (1973): 298–321. .
- Gray, Marion W. “Prussia in Transition: Society and Politics under the Stein Reform Ministry of 1808.” Transactions of the American Philosophical Society 76, no. 1 (1986): 1–175. .
- Shanahan, William O. “The Social Outlook of Prussian Conservatism.” The Review of Politics 15, no. 2 (1953): 209–52. .
- Shearer Davis Bowman. “Antebellum Planters and Vormärz Junkers in Comparative Perspective.” The American Historical Review 85, no. 4 (1980): 779–808. .
