= List of bishops of Hamburg =

This list of bishops, seniors, and superintendents of Hamburg records the spiritual heads of the Lutheran church in Hamburg. Originally the Lutheran church in Hamburg formed a state church established by Johannes Bugenhagen's church order on 15 May 1529, after most of Hamburg's burghers had adopted Lutheranism before. As state church it was governed in administrative matters by the Senate of Hamburg (city government) and the Chief Elders, according to the law named the Long Recess of 1529. At first the church order provided for superintendents as spiritual leaders. Since 1593 the spiritual leadership was wielded by a collegial body, the Spiritual Ministerium, with a senior elected by its members, the ministers (pastors) of the parishes. Separation of Church and State started in 1860, with the last privileges of state patronage waived in 1919. The new church order of 1923 enfranchised the synodals to elect one of the five Hauptpastoren (i.e. principal or head pastors) at the quintet of Hamburg's five Hauptkirchen (principal or head churches) as senior.

After the putsch in the synod of 1933 by conservative Lutherans the new hierarchical office of bishop was created, establishing episcopalism and doing away with synodal and presbyterial polity and neglecting the traditional function of senior and spiritual ministerium. In 1934 through a second putsch by German Christians, backed by secular Nazi authorities, one of their acolytes assumed the episcopate. After the British occupiers prompted the bishop's resignation in late 1945, the presbyterial and synodal constitution of 1923 was restored, however, retaining the title bishop, but stripped of any episcopal supremacy, and reestablishing the office of senior, then functioning as the bishop's deputy. Conservative Lutherans prevailed again reelecting their first bishop of 1933. In 1977 the Hamburg Church seized its independent existence and merged with three neighbouring church bodies, in 2012 another merger with two more church bodies followed. Spiritual leaders for the Hamburg region retained the title of bishop, however, the traditional Hamburg seniorate was ended in 1976.

== History ==
"In Hamburg as in other cities, the parishes … had been not only church districts but also municipal political districts since the Middle Ages. They … formed four incorporated bodies (Petri, Nikolai, Katharinen, Jacobi) in which the “allodial” (property-owning) burghers and the heads of guilds - thus only a fraction of the male population - were entitled to vote. The Reformation brought with it a significant curtailment of the senate's governmental power." "At about the same time, three deacons from each parish (twelve altogether), acting as “chief elders”, took on the task of centralizing, administering, and uniformly distributing relief to the poor." Later the parishioners of St. Michael's Church in the New Town, established as parish independent of St. Nicholas in 1647, were granted the same rights than the burghers in one of the four parishes in the Old Town, and the same number or representatives. Together with the four above-mentioned churches St. Michael's forms until today the quintet of Hamburg's head churches. "Beginning in 1685, there were thus fifteen chief elders: sixty deacons instead of forty-eight and 180 assembly members altogether, rather than 144. These structures existed into the nineteenth century, with each college recruiting new members from the next larger." Since Lutheran parishes and the collegial bodies staffed with their parishioners formed the constitutional bodies of Hamburg there was no easy way to open politics for non-Lutherans.

The superintendents were initially appointed by the senate. In 1593 the superintendency was given up and the pastors of the five urban congregations formed the spiritual ministerium (Geistliches Ministerium), collegially wielding spiritual leadership of the state church and electing from its midst one of the head pastors the senior as primus inter pares only.

In 1806 Hamburg turned into an independent sovereign city-state, annexed to France 1811–1814, and reconstituted thereafter. Reforms started with granting citizenship to non-Lutherans, and the full emancipation of Calvinists, Catholics and Jews until 1849. Adherents to these faithes could then enter officialdom and parliament. In 1860 the new Constitution of Hamburg provided for a start in separating state and church. Rather than the senate directly governing and administering Lutheran church matters, separate bodies were developed. The chief elders lost their role as constitutional body within Hamburg's administration, but continued as a body of Lutheran charity. The administration of the Lutheran state church was altered in order to become a body separate from the government. Only the Lutheran members within the senate formed a college in charge of confirming the acts passed by the synodals as well as the elections of various officeholders within the Church, such as the senior of Hamburg, pastors, synodals and even laymen in presbyteries. The Lutheran church established self-rule and in 1871 reconstituted as a regional Protestant church body called Evangelical Lutheran Church in the Hamburgian State.

The spiritual leadership remained with the spiritual ministerium with its senior. In March 1919 the Lutheran senators waived the senate's supreme governance (summepiscopacy; like the royal supreme governance of the Church of England), the privilege to confirm elected seniors and taken synodal decisions. The Lutheran Church in the Hamburg State accounted for this change and adopted a democratised constitution in 1923. The synod was now the highest legislator of the church, electing the church council (Kirchenrat), the executive, including the senior as its ex officio member. The senior again was still to be elected from the five head pastors, but not by the members of the spiritual ministerium, but by the synod. The spiritual ministerium, comprising all the Lutheran clergy, with many more than the five head churches and parishes being established in the 19th century, was redefined as a mere advisory and reviewing body.

With the introduction of the general and equal suffrage also for women and people with no or only low incomes in Hamburg in 1919 also the Evangelical Lutheran Church in the Hamburgian State established equal suffrage in presbyterial and synodal elections by an emergency ordinance in 1919 and its revised constitution in 1923.

After Hindenburg's suspension of central Weimar Constitutional civil liberties, followed by the Nazi takeover on the Reich's level and with its Empowerment Act de facto doing away with state autonomy the last democratic senate was deposed, and the Hamburg parliament restaffed disregarding Hamburg's state election outcome but mirroring the rather Nazi-preferential allocation of seats realised on the Reich's level. This atmosphere of hunting democratic witches encouraged antirepublican Nazi-submissive synodals affiliated with the so-called German Christians and conservative antiliberal synodals of the so-called Young-Reformatory Movement, led by Bernhard Heinrich Forck, to form a new majority in Hamburg's synod imposing a putsch within the church's bodies. The incumbent Senior Karl Horn was forced into resignation and an extraordinary synod convened. On 29 May 1933 this synod established the new function of a state bishop (Landesbischof) with hierarchic supremacy over all the clergy following the Nazi Führerprinzip, thus doing away with collegiality in church bodies, and empowered the new state bishop Simon Schöffel to rule discretionarily without the synod, abolishing the previously practised synodal and presbyterial polity in Hamburg's church. This putsch turned Hamburg's church into a streamlined church body subjected to a state bishop obedient to the new Nazi regime and open for any experiment as to domesticating Protestantism for the Nazi purpose.

So when Hitler's government imposed an unconstitutional premature reelection of all presbyters (elders) and the synod for 23 July 1933 – also in the other regional Protestant church bodies in Germany – the so-called German Christians and the Kirchenpartei Gospel and Church (a merger including the Young-Reformatory Movement, dominated by the latter's proponents) presented the Lutheran Hamburg electorate united lists of candidates for the synod and all presbyteries, each staffed with 51% German Christians and 49% proponents of Gospel and Church. So in Hamburg the election of synod and presbyteries turned into a sheer farce. So these united lists attracted the traditionally fragmented rightist faction within the Lutheran electorate, but granted the so-called German Christians a share in the seats far exceeding their proportion among Lutheran parishioners. Nazi government-funded propaganda mobilised previously inactive church members adhering to Nazism to vote for the united lists, causing a very high turnout of voters unheard of in earlier church elections. So the candidates of the united lists gained the majority in the synod and in most presbyteries.

Opposition developed, called the Confessing Church, and its adherents considered the Evangelical Lutheran Church in the Hamburgian State to be a so-called destroyed church for having no unadulterated bodies and leadership anymore and thus not deserving the compliance of the opposing parishioners and clergy. Leading members of the confessing church in Hamburg, such as Forck and Theodor Knolle, had earlier themselves participated in the putsch streamlining their church. The German Christians radicalised during the 1930s so that Schöffel, himself a putschist, was forced to resign again in early March 1934. On 5 March Franz Tügel succeeded.

With the defeat of Germany and its Nazi government the Evangelical Lutheran Church in the Hamburgian State returned to its pre-1933 constitution, only reluctantly cleansing its staff and bodies from few of the most extreme proponents of the German Christians. However, its spiritual leaders continued to be titled bishop. With effect of 1 January 1977 the Evangelical Lutheran Church in the Hamburgian State merged with three neighbouring Lutheran churches in the new North Elbian Evangelical Lutheran Church, which - consisting of three spiritual ambits (Lutheran diocese) – upheld the function of bishop of Hamburg until 2008. Since the episcopal ambits have been redrawn, with Hamburg being part of the new ambit called Hamburg and Lübeck including also parts of southeastern Holstein and Lübeck, but seated in Hamburg. This ambit structure continued also after the North Elbian Church merged with two neighbouring churches in the new Evangelical Lutheran Church in Northern Germany (abbr.: Northern Church)

== Titles of the spiritual leaders of the Lutheran church in Hamburg ==
Titles and ambits of the incumbents altered. The respective incumbents of the spiritual leadership held the following titles and ambits :

- Superintendent of Hamburg in its respective political borders from 1532 to 1593
- Spiritual Ministerium, collegially with its senior as primus inter pares, for Hamburg in its respective political borders 1593–1933
- State Bishop (Landesbischof) of Hamburg in its political borders of 1936, from 1933 to 1976
- Bishop of the Hamburg Ambit, comprising the city-state in its political borders of 1937 and some congregations in its eastern vicinity, within the North Elbian Evangelical Lutheran Church from 1977 to 2008
- Bishop of the Hamburg and Lübeck Ambit, comprising the city-state and some congregations in its western and northern vicinity and all the congregations in southeastern Holstein including Lübeck, within the North Elbian Evangelical Lutheran Church from 2008 to 2012
- Bishop of the Hamburg and Lübeck Ambit, as mentioned above, within the Evangelical Lutheran Church in Northern Germany since 27 May 2012

== Spiritual leaders of the Lutheran church in Hamburg ==
=== Superintendents of Hamburg (1532–1593) ===
Superintendents of Hamburg (1529–1593)
Superintendency	Portrait	Name, life data	Notes
1532–1553		Johannes Aepinus (aka Johann Hoeck/Huck/Hugk/Hoch); Ziesar, *1499–1553*, Hamburg	before head pastor at the Head Church of St. Peter's in Hamburg from 1529 to 1532
1553–1555	vacancy		
1555–1562		Paul von Eitzen; Hamburg, *1521–1598*, Schleswig	later superintendent (elevated to general superintendent as of 1564) for the ducal share in Schleswig duchy from 1562 to 1593, and general provost for the ducal share in Holstein from 1564 to 1593
1562–1571	vacancy	Joachim Westphal already serving per pro	
1571–1574		Joachim Westphal; Hamburg, *1510–1574*, Hamburg	before head pastor at the Head Church of Catherine's in Hamburg from 1541 to 1571 and senior
1574–1576		Cyriacus Simon	before head pastor at the Head Church of St. James in Hamburg from 1565 to 1576
1576–1580	vacancy		
1580–1593		David Penshorn; Hamburg, *by 1533–1593*, Hamburg	before head pastor at the Head Church of St. Nicholas in Hamburg from 1565 to 1580

=== Seniors collegially with the Head Pastors (1593–1933) ===
Seniors collegially with the Head Pastors (1593–1933)
Seniorate	Portrait	Name, life data	Notes
1593–1600		Georg Stamke (aka Stammich[ius])	also head pastor at the Head Church of Catherine's in Hamburg from 1572 to 1600
1600–1613		Bernhard Vaget; Hamburg, *1548–1613*, Hamburg	also head pastor at the Head Church of St. Nicholas in Hamburg from 1581 to 1613
1613–1620		Johann Schellhammer (aka Schelhammer); Weira, *1540–1620*, Hamburg	also head pastor at the Head Church of St. Peter's in Hamburg from 1590 to 1620
1621–1633		Martin Willich (aka Willechius); Falkenberg in the March, *1583–1633*, Hamburg	also head pastor at the Head Church of Catherine's in Hamburg from 1614 to 1633
1633–1646		Nicolaus Hardkopf; Osten, *1582–1650*, Hamburg	also head pastor at the Head Church of St. Nicholas in Hamburg from 1615 to 1646
1646–1648		Severin Schlüter (aka Slüter); Halle in Westphalia, *1571–1648*, Hamburg	also head pastor at the Head Church of St. James in Hamburg from 1617 to 1648
1648–1672		Johannes Müller; Breslau, *1590–1673*, Hamburg	also head pastor at the Head Church of St. Peter's in Hamburg from 1626 to 1672
1672–1679		Gottfried Gesius (aka Gese); Müncheberg, *1608–1679*, Hamburg	also head pastor at the Head Church of St. Nicholas in Hamburg from 1647 to 1679
1679–1688		David Klug (aka Kluge, Klugius); Tilsit, *1618–1688*, Hamburg	also head pastor at the Head Church of Catherine's in Hamburg from 1665 to 1688
1688–1699		Samuel Schultze (aka Schulde Scultetus, Schulcetus); Eddelak, *1635–1699*, Hamburg	also head pastor at the Head Church of St. Peter's in Hamburg from 1683 to 1699
1699–1705		Johann Winckler; Golzern bei Grimma, *1642–1705*, Hamburg	also head pastor at the Head Church of St. Michael's in Hamburg from 1684 to 1705
1705–1715		Johann Volckmar; *1660–1715*	also head pastor at the Head Church of Catherine's in Hamburg from 1696 to 1715
1715–1730		Peter Theodor Seelmann; Oedenburg, Hungary, *1656–1730*, Hamburg	also head pastor at the Head Church of St. Michael's in Hamburg from 1706 to 1730
1730–1738		Johann Friedrich Winckler	also head pastor at the Head Church of St. Nicholas in Hamburg from 1712 to 1738
1738–1743		Johann Georg Palm; Hanover, *1697–1743*, Hamburg	also head pastor at the Head Church of St. Peter's in Hamburg from 1727 to 1743
1743–1760		Friedrich Wagner; Karow near Genthin, *1693–1760*, Hamburg	also head pastor at the Head Church of St. Michael's in Hamburg from 1736 to 1760
1760–1770		Johann Melchior Goeze; Halberstadt, *1717–1786*, Hamburg	nicknamed: Zion's Guardian; also head pastor at the Head Church of Catherine's in Hamburg from 1755 to 1786
1770–1779		Georg Ludwig Herrnschmidt (aka Herrnschmid, Herrenschmid); Bopfingen, *1712–1779*, Hamburg	also head pastor at the Head Church of St. Michael's in Hamburg from 1765 to 1779
1779–1784		Johann Dietrich Winckler (aka Dieterich); Hamburg, *1711–1784*, Hamburg	also head pastor at the Head Church of St. Nicholas in Hamburg from 1758 to 1784
1784–1801		Christian Ludwig Gerling (aka Ludwig Gerling); Rostock, *1745–1801*, Hamburg	also head pastor at the Head Church of St. James in Hamburg from 1777 to 1801
1801–1818		Johann Jacob Rambach; Teupitz, *1737–1818*, Ottensen	also head pastor at the Head Church of St. Michael's in Hamburg from 1780 to 1818
1818–1834		Heinrich Julius Willerding; Hildesheim, *1748–1834*, Hamburg	also head pastor at the Head Church of St. Peter's in Hamburg from 1787 to 1834
1834–1851		August Jacob Rambach; Quedlinburg, *1777–1851*, Hamburg	also head pastor at the Head Church of St. Michael's in Hamburg from 1818 to 1851
1851–1855		Ludwig Christian Gottlieb Strauch; Hamburg, *1786–1855*	also head pastor at the Head Church of St. Nicholas in Hamburg from 1819 to 1855
1855–1860		Moritz Ferdinand Schmaltz; Stolpen, *1785–1860*, Hamburg	also head pastor at the Head Church of St. James in Hamburg from 1833 to 1860
1860–1869		Johann Karl Wilhelm Alt; Hoyerswerda, *1797–1869*, Hamburg	also head pastor at the Head Church of St. Peter's in Hamburg from 1835 to 1869
1870–1879		Johannes Andreas Rehhoff; Tondern, *1800–1883*, Hamburg	before general superintendent for the Danish-speaking parishes in Schleswig from 1848 to 1850; also head pastor at the Head Church of St. Michael's in Hamburg from 1851 to 1879
1879–1891		Georg Karl Hirsche; Brunswick, *1816–1892*, Hamburg	also head pastor at the Head Church of St. Nicholas in Hamburg from 1863 to 1891
1891–1894		Adolph Kreusler; *1824–1894*	also head pastor at the Head Church of St. Peter's in Hamburg from 1871 to 1894
1894–1911		Georg Behrmann; Hamburg, *1846–1911*, Hamburg	also head pastor at the Head Church of St. Michael's in Hamburg from 1879 to 1911
1911–1920		Eduard Grimm; *1848–1932*	also head pastor at the Head Church of St. Nicholas in Hamburg from 1892 to 1920,
1920–1923		Friedrich Gottlieb Theodor Rode; Hamburg, *1855–1923*, Hamburg	also head pastor at the Head Church of St. Peter's in Hamburg from 1894 to 1923
1923–1929		Carl Gustav Curt Stage; Waldenburg in Silesia, *1866–1931*, Wernigerode	also head pastor at the Head Church of Catherine's in Hamburg from 1903 to 1929
1929–1933		Karl Horn; Neustrelitz, *1869–1942*, Hamburg	also head pastor at the Head Church of St. James in Hamburg from 1916 to 1934; in May 1933 forced into resignation by Nazi-submissive synodals streamlining Hamburg's church from within

=== State Bishops of Hamburg (1933–1976) ===
State Bishops of Hamburg as uncontrollable autocrats (1933–1946)
Episcopate	Portrait	Name, life data	Notes	General super-intendency	Portrait	Name, life data	Notes
1933–1934		Simon Schöffel; Nuremberg, *1880–1959*, Hamburg	also head pastor at the Head Church of St. Michael's in Hamburg from 1922 and 1954; he led the putsch in the synod against Senior Horn in May 1933, a majority of submissive synodals abolished synodal co-rule, established episcopal hierarchy and elected him first state bishop. He resigned under pressure of a more radical Nazi-submissive synodal faction in March 1934, reelected in 1946	1933–1934		Theodor Knolle; Hildesheim, *1885–1955*, Hamburg	appointed general superintendent, a new title in Hamburg, as deputy of the new state bishop on 25 July 1933; opposing the merger of Hamburg's church into the Protestant Reich Church Knolle resigned on 1 March 1934; also head pastor at the Head Church of St. Peter's in Hamburg from 1924 to 1955
1934–1945		Franz Tügel; Hamburg, *1888–1946*, Hamburg	also head pastor at the Head Church of St. James in Hamburg from 1934 to 1940; appointed as sharp proponent of the German Christians he quitted that movement in 1935 and wielded an autocratic governance, not opposing any Nazi policy outside the church, but comprising many potential antagonists within the church by granting them exceptions such as allowing pastors in so-called mixed marriages with wives classified by the Nazi anti-Semitic categories as Jewesses due to three or more grandparents enrolled in Jewish congregations, to stay in ecclesiastical service, unheard of in other streamlined regional Protestant church bodies. The Aryan paragraph was never made church law, but the church provided no mercy let alone protection for Lutherans, who - not protected by mixed marriages - were to be deported to ghettos and extermination camps in the east due to their Jewish descent, let alone speaking up for unbaptised people of Jewish faith. Since 1935 Tügel ejected the quarrelling and thus increasingly unpopular German Christians from using church property for free, speeding their fading and financial collapse. The Control Commission for Germany - British Element (CCG/BE) forced the completely undiscerning Tügel into resignation on 18 July 1945.				
The church constitution of 1923, suppressed in 1933, regained validity in 1945.
State Bishops of the Evangelical Lutheran Church in the Hamburgian State (1946–1958)
Episcopate	Portrait	Name, life data	Notes				
1946–1954		Simon Schöffel; Nuremberg, *1880–1959*, Hamburg	also head pastor at the Head Church of St. Michael's in Hamburg from 1922 and 1954; presenting himself as victim of Nazism with his deposal by more radical Nazi-submissive synodals in March 1934, he cared a lot about his like, former German Christians and their collaborators, thus he organised their speedy formal de-Nazification and reemployment in pastorates or other functions within the church. He falsified the history, claiming that not he headed the putschist movement of 1933 which established the autocratic episcopacy in Hamburg's Church empowered to legislate without synod, but pretended it were introduced by his successor Tügel in 1934 only. Schöffel did silence over his Nazi collaboration, but not over Nazi crimes which he blatantly qualified as less bad than the suffering of Germans under the Allies.				
1954–1955		Theodor Knolle; Hildesheim, *1885–1955*, Hamburg	also head pastor at the Head Church of St. Peter's in Hamburg from 1924 to 1955				
1956–1958		Volkmar Herntrich; Flensburg, *1908–1958*, Lietzow near Nauen	also head pastor at the Head Church of Catherine's in Hamburg from 1942 to 1958				
On 19 February 1959 the synod enacted a new church order for the Evangelical Lutheran Church in the Hamburgian State, including more parishioners' and synodal participation and collegiality in leadership.
State Bishops of the Evangelical Lutheran Church in the Hamburgian State (1959–1976)				Seniors as deputy bishops (1959–1976)			
Episcopate	Portrait	Name, life data	Notes	Seniorate	Portrait	Name, life data	Notes
1959–1964		Karl Witte; Aken, *1893–1966*, Hamburg	also head pastor at the Head Church of St. Peter's in Hamburg from 1956 to 1964	1959–1964		Hans-Otto Wölber; Hamburg, *1913–1989*, Hamburg	also head pastor at the Head Church of St. Nicholas in Hamburg from 1956 to 1983; advanced to state bishop
1964–1983		Hans-Otto Wölber; Hamburg, *1913–1989*, Hamburg	also head pastor at the Head Church of St. Nicholas in Hamburg from 1956 to 1983; before Senior of Hamburg	1964–1967		Hans-Heinrich Harms; Scharmbeck, *1914–2006*, Oldenburg in Oldenburg	also head pastor at the Head Church of St. Michael's in Hamburg from 1960 and 1967; thereafter bishop of the Evangelical Lutheran Church in Oldenburg from 1967 to 1985
1964–1983		Hans-Otto Wölber; Hamburg, *1913–1989*, Hamburg	also head pastor at the Head Church of St. Nicholas in Hamburg from 1956 to 1983; before Senior of Hamburg	1967–1968		Hartmut Sierig; Cassel, *1925–1968*, Hamburg	also head pastor at the Head Church of Catherine's in Hamburg from 1960 to 1968
1964–1983		Hans-Otto Wölber; Hamburg, *1913–1989*, Hamburg	also head pastor at the Head Church of St. Nicholas in Hamburg from 1956 to 1983; before Senior of Hamburg	1969–1976		Carl Malsch; Hamburg, *1916–2001*, Hamburg	before Bishop of the Evangelical Lutheran Church in Jordan and Provost of Jerusalem at Redeemer Church, both from 1959 to 1965; then head pastor at the Head Church of St. Peter's in Hamburg from 1965 to 1981
The synod decided for the merger of the Evangelical Lutheran Church in the Hamburgian State with three neighbouring regional Lutheran church bodies in the North Elbian Evangelical Lutheran Church with effect of 1 January 1977.

=== Bishops of Hamburg (1977–2008) ===
Bishops of the Hamburg Ambit (Sprengel Hamburg) within the North Elbian Evangelical Lutheran Church (1977–2008)
The spiritual leading function – one among three within the North Elbian Evangelical Lutheran Church – was retitled bishop, the pertaining ambit was extended from Hamburg in its borders of 1860 to its widened borders of 1937 including some parishes beyond the eastern city boundary, whereas Cuxhaven's parishes were ceded to Hanover's Lutheran Church.
Episcopate	Portrait	Name, life data	Notes
1964–1983		Hans-Otto Wölber; Hamburg, *1913–1989*, Hamburg	also head pastor at the Head Church of St. Nicholas in Hamburg from 1956 to 1983
1983–1992		Peter Krusche; Tuczyn, *1924–2000*, Fürstenfeldbruck	also head pastor at the Head Church of St. Nicholas in Hamburg from 1983 to 1987
1992–2008		Maria Jepsen born in 1945 in Bad Segeberg	first female Lutheran bishop worldwide
On 28 March 2009 the synod decided for a merger of the North Elbian Evangelical Lutheran Church with two neighbouring regional church bodies, one Lutheran and one with united traditions, in the Evangelical Lutheran Church in Northern Germany with effect of 27 May 2012.

=== Bishops of Hamburg and Lübeck (as of 2008) ===
Bishops of the Hamburg and Lübeck Ambit (Sprengel Hamburg und Lübeck)
The new extended ambit was formed by the North Elbian Evangelical Lutheran Church in reaction to decreasing numbers of parishioners and their contributions and in preparation of the merger with two neighbouring haggard churches planned for 2012.
Episcopate	Portrait	Name, life data	Notes
2008–2010		Maria Jepsen born in 1945 in Bad Segeberg	resigned after allegations that she had not acted on information about a child abuse case
2010–2011		per pro: Provost Jürgen Bollmann	
2011– date		Kirsten Fehrs born in 1961 in Wesselburen	before head pastor at the Head Church of St. James in Hamburg from 2006 to 2011
The Hamburg and Lübeck Ambit is continued by the new Evangelical Lutheran Church in Northern Germany.
2011– date		Kirsten Fehrs born in 1961 in Wesselburen	
