= Stella (play) =

1806 tragedy in five acts by Johann Wolfgang von Goethe

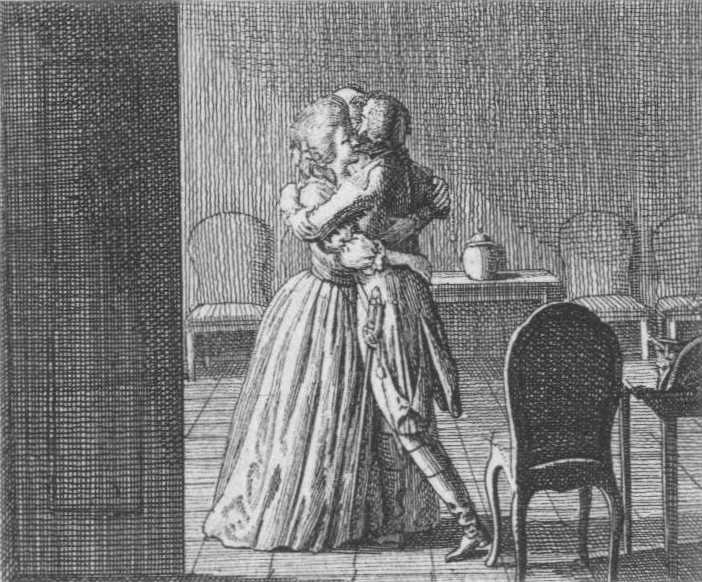
- Final scene of the first version
- Written by: Johann Wolfgang von Goethe
- Original language: German
- Genre: Tragedy

Premiere
- Date premiered: 15 January 1806
- Place premiered: Ducal private theater in Weimar

Stella is a tragedy in five acts by Johann Wolfgang von Goethe. It was written between 1803 and 1805, based on a first version of 1775, and premiered in Weimar on 15 January 1806. It was printed in 1816.

== Inspiration ==
Goethe was inspired by the story of the Knight of Gleichen. His gravestone in Erfurt Cathedral shows the knight with two women. According to legend, the knight was captured during the Crusade. A Sultan's daughter fell in love with him, gave him his freedom and fled with him to Thuringia. He solved the problem of wanting to have his savior at his side in addition to his wife by successfully requesting legitimation from the Holy See.

Despite their completely different social status, there are analogies between the figure of Stella and Gretchen from Goethe's Faust.

== Plot ==
=== Act One ===
In the post office

Cecilia arrives with her daughter Lucie at the home of Baroness Stella, hoping that Lucie will get a job with Stella. Before their first meeting with Stella, the two ladies learn a lot about the Baroness from the talkative postmistress. Eight years ago, the Baron bought the local manor. "The Baroness, beautiful as an angel, was very young at the time, no older than sixteen. Her child died soon after." Suddenly, it was announced: "The gentleman is gone." Rumors came up that "they were never married and that he had kidnapped her". The travelers go to their room.

Officer Fernando, as luck would have it, has arrived from the battlefield. "He helped suppress the dying freedom of the noble Corsicans." Now he monologues: "Stella! I'm coming! Don't you feel my approach?" By coincidence the three travelers arrive almost simultaneously. Fernando immediately explained his reason for travelling. Lucie comes down to the table while her mother stays in the room. At the table, Lucie meets Fernando. During the meal, he learns from the young girl, with interest, why she is there and what she intends to do. Lucie is taken by the person she is talking to: "He is a wonderful person!"

=== Act Two ===
Lucie and Cecilia pay their first visit to Stella. Cecilia learns from Stella about the dead child Mina and about Stella's "terrible despair". Stella leads Cecilia and Lucie into her study because she wants to show the visitor the portrait of the child's father. Cecilia's has to recognise her husband Fernando, who had left her and Lucie. The person portrayed also seems familiar to Lucie: "I must tell you, today I ate over there in the post office with an officer who looks like this gentleman. - Oh, it's him himself!"

Stella can hardly believe it and is dazed with happiness. She wants to be alone until her lover arrives and sends the visitors away.

In private, Cecilia has to confess to her daughter: "The one she was expecting - beloved! - That's my husband! - It's your father!" Lucie has sought employment from her father's lover, of all people, with the help of her mother. Cecilia wants to get out of the center of the tragedy immediately, wants to flee - as far away as possible with the next extra post.

=== Act Three ===
Stella embraces Fernando and calls: "Dear! - you've been away for a long time! - But you're here!" She is boundlessly happy, but also a bit realistic: "I've grown older, haven't I? Isn't it true that misery has stripped the blossom from my cheeks." Her lover has come, but there is still reality: he had kidnapped her and then left alone at the manor. Stella forgives: "God forgive you, who made you like this - so fickle and so loyal!" Stella is just as loyal as Cecilia. Concerned only with her own happiness, she has turned away the two petitioners. Now she comes to her senses. Fernando should fix it: "Talk to them, Fernando! - Right now! Now! - Make the mother come over."

Fernando wants to bring the mother over and has to realize that she is his wife Cecilia. In a slow process of recognition he has to face their failed marriage. Cecilia is full of self-reproach: "I was not an entertaining companion... He [Fernando] is not guilty!" But Fernando, the fickle one, pleads guilty. And the handsome soldier goes a step further: "Nothing, nothing in the world shall separate me from you. I have found you again." Cecilia states succinctly: "Found what you were not looking for!" When Lucie then throws herself in her father's arms, the decision seems to have been made. Fernando wants to leave Stella and travel with his family: "I want to break away from her [Stella]."

=== Act Four ===
Hermitage in Stella's garden

Leaving is difficult for Fernando. Stella is eagerly awaiting her lover. Fernando comes and does not reveal the truth, but says to Stella: "The old woman [Cecilia] is a good woman;... she wants to leave". Fernando does not tell Stella the truth.

Cecilia has taken Fernando's word at face value and has reserved three seats in the stagecoach. The women sit on packed suitcases, waiting for Fernando; they send for him. The hesitant Fernando cannot help himself and calls out: "Stella, you are everything to me! Stella! I am leaving you!" Stella faints. Lucie and Cecilia check the situation. When Stella regains her senses, Cecilia tells her: "I am - I am his wife!" Stella blames herself for having robbed Lucie of her father and Cecilia of her husband, but then admits that she was innocent. Nonetheless, "her heart is torn, she screams and flees".

=== Act Five ===
Stella's Cabinet

Stella is torn between hate and love: "I hate you!... Darling! Darling!" Fernando is caught in a dilemma: "these three best female creatures on earth - miserable because of me - miserable without me! - Oh, even more miserable with me!" Cecilia's tries to solve the problem but Lucie tells her mother that Stella has probably taken poison. When Fernando sees Stella's appearance and hears her "I am finished", he retreats and shoots himself. Stella collapses and dies.

== First version ==
Goethe titled the first version, written in April 1775, Stella. A Play for Lovers in Five Acts. The play was premiered in Hamburg on 8 February 1776 and printed the same year.

The first version differs from the second in the ending. In the later play, Stella and Fernando die a love death, not together but individually, with poison and with a handgun respectively. In the first version, Goethe ended suggesting allowed himself a future life in polygamy, which did not please the morally strict audience. Cecilia had the idea of emulating Count Ernst von Gleichen, who had a bigamous marriage with papal approval. When the curtain falls, Stella, Cecilia and Fernando want to stay together with Lucie according to the motto "one apartment, one bed and one grave".

== Reception ==
The happy ending of the first version of the drama, in which Fernando is rewarded instead of punished, led to incomprehension among most contemporaries. The play was judged exclusively according to the social and moral criteria of the time. Like “Werther,” it contradicted the Enlightenment concept of education through literature, which only allowed emotional arousal through aesthetic sensuality as a didactic means of moralizing actions. After the first performance, performances were banned.

One of the critics of the first version was the Hamburg pastor Johann Melchior Goeze, who was well known for his dispute with Lessing over the fragments and who was aware of the danger of imitating the actors' actions: "According to his (Goethe's) morality, what the right calls malitiosam desertationem ('malicious abandonment'), and what the Holy Scripture condemns under the name of fornication and adultery, is probably part of the noble freedom of man, and lovers can, if they know how to do it right, use it as a means of raising the sweet enjoyment of the joys of this life to a very high level."

However, there were also positive reactions. In the context of the age of sensitivity, a reception attitude had developed that no longer expected art to primarily provide moral instruction, but above all to arouse feelings. As the subtitle of the play already suggested (“A play for lovers”), only sensitive people, not rational people, would understand “the exuberant beauties of this play,” in which the connection between love and virtue was abandoned in the name of the language of the heart.

Charlotte von Stein commented on the second version of the play:

“His old Stella was performed recently; he turned the drama into a tragedy. But it was not well received. Fernando shoots himself, and one cannot feel sorry for the deceiver. It would have been better if he had [only] let Stella die; but he took it very badly when I criticized this.”

– Charlotte von Stein 1806

Aesthetes accuse the play of formal weaknesses, and moralists repeatedly bring up moral arguments against the play. Nevertheless, it has proven to be "eminently playable to this day." Wilhelm Wilmanns compares two characters - Stella with Belinde from Georges de Scudéry's La Morale du monde ou Conversations (published in the 1680s).

== Radio plays ==
- SÜFRAG 1925: Stella, director and speaker: Gerd Fricke
- SÜRAG 1926: Stella, director: Karl Köstlin
- MIRAG 1928: Stella, director: Josef Krahé
- SWF 1946: Stella, director: Karl Peter Biltz
- BR 1949: Stella, director: Heinz-Günter Stamm
- SDR 1952: Stella, director: Paul Hoffmann
- HR 1952: Stella, director: Walter Knaus
- SWR/MDR 2006: Stella, adaptation and director: Leonhard Koppelmann
