= Goeze =

Goeze is a surname. Notable people with the surname include:

- Johann August Ephraim Goeze (1731–1793), German zoologist
- Johann Melchior Goeze (1717–1786), German Lutheran pastor, theologian, and Christian apologetics writer

== See also ==
- Goeke
