= Kirsten Fehrs =

German Lutheran bishop

The Right Reverend Kirsten Fehrs
- Bishop in the Diocese of Hamburg and Lübeck
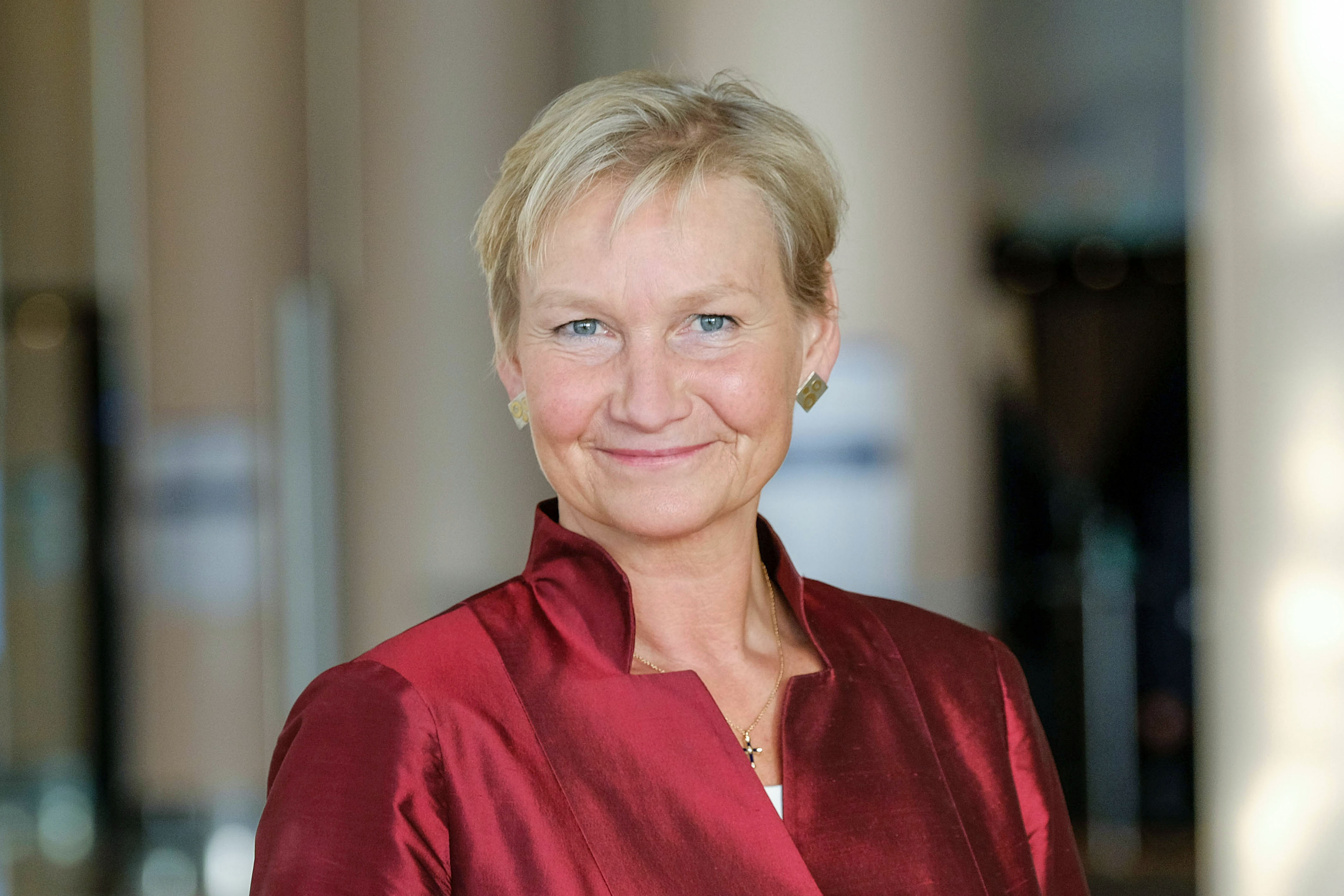
- Kirsten Fehrs (2021)
- Church: Evangelical Lutheran Church in Northern Germany
- Diocese: Hamburg and Lübeck
- Appointed: 2011
- Predecessor: Maria Jepsen
- Other post: President of the Council of the Evangelical Church in Germany

Orders
- Ordination: 1990
- Consecration: 26 November 2011 by Gerhard Ulrich

Personal details
- Born: 12 September 1961 (age 65) Wesselburen, West Germany
- Spouse: Karsten Fehrs
- Education: University of Hamburg

Kirsten Fehrs (born 12 September 1961, in Wesselburen) is a Lutheran bishop of the Evangelical Lutheran Church in Northern Germany. Since November 2024, she is President of the Council of the Evangelical Church in Germany after serving as its acting President since 2023.

== Life ==
Fehrs studied Lutheran theology at University of Hamburg. In December 1990 she was ordained as pastor in Hamburg. She worked as pastor of St. James' Church, one of Hamburg's principal churches. In 2011, the synod (church parliament) of the North Elbian Evangelical Lutheran Church elected her bishop of the regions Hamburg and Lübeck. She has been bishop of the Evangelical Lutheran Church in Northern Germany since the North Elbian Church merged with the Evangelical Lutheran Church of Mecklenburg and the Pomeranian Evangelical Church in 2012.

== Works ==
- Miteinander leben lernen – Gemeindenahe Erwachsenenbildung in ländlicher Region. In: forum EB (= Erwachsenenbildung) 02/1997.
- Lebensbegleitung als Kooperationsmodell – Bericht über einen Kooperationsprozess der Familien-Bildungsstätte und der Erwachsenenbildung im Kirchenkreis Rendsburg. In: forum EB. 02/2001.
- Personalentwicklung konkret – Ansätze und Gespräche. In: Lernort Gemeinde. 08/02.
- Macht ist für mich positiv besetzt. In: Marlis Prinzing: Meine Wut rettet mich. Verlag Kösel, 2012, ISBN 978-3-466-37036-8, pages 251ff.

Kirsten Fehrs Born: 12 September 1961 in Wesselburen
Titles in Lutheranism
Preceded by Maria Jepsen	Bishop of the Hamburg and Lübeck Ambit within the North Elbian Evangelical Lutheran Church (2011–2012); Evangelical Lutheran Church in Northern Germany (since); 2011–present	Incumbent
