= Evangelical Lutheran Church in Northern Germany =

Group of churches in Germany

Logo of Evangelical Lutheran Church in Northern Germany

Extent of Evangelical Lutheran Church in Northern Germany

The Evangelical Lutheran Church in Northern Germany (Evangelisch-Lutherische Kirche in Norddeutschland) is a Lutheran member church of the Protestant Church in Germany (Evangelische Kirche in Deutschland, EKD).

The denomination was established on 27 May 2012 as a merger of the North Elbian Evangelical Lutheran Church, the Evangelical Lutheran Church of Mecklenburg, and the Pomeranian Evangelical Church. It covers the combined area of all those former member churches, which are the federal states of Schleswig-Holstein, Hamburg and Mecklenburg-Vorpommern. Nordkirche is the only Landeskirche in Germany which covers parts of both New states of Germany and West Germany. It is also called Nordkirche (North Church).

In 2016, Nordkirche had 1,704 ordained pastors and more than 84,000 volunteers, and by the end of 2020, they had 1,892,749 members. At the end of 2022, this had gone down to 1,772,953 members, with 1,562 pastors. At the end of 2025 membership further dropped to 1,583,785 members.

== Landesbischof ==
The Landesbischof (Presiding Bishop) is the senior (metropolitan) bishop and principal leader of the Nordkirche. In German, Nordkirche uses the title Landesbischof (literally: State Bishop). They have their see in Schwerin Cathedral but preach in both Schwerin Cathedral and Lübeck Cathedral in Lübeck. They are the leader and primus inter pares of the bishops in the dioceses (Sprengel). They chair the Council of Bishops (Bischofsrat) and the Church Executive Board (Kirchenleitung).

First Landesbischof Gerhard Ulrich also served as Leitender Bischof (Leading Bishop) of United Evangelical Lutheran Church of Germany from 2011 until 2018. Ulrich was retired as Presiding Bishop 31 March 2019. On 27 September 2018, the General Synod elected regional bishop (Regionalbischöfin) Kristina Kühnbaum-Schmidt as new Presiding Bishop (Landesbischöfin). She started to serve as new Presiding Bishop 1 April 2019; Gerhard Ulrich gave back his pectoral cross 9 March 2019 and was retired 31 March 2019.

== Dioceses ==
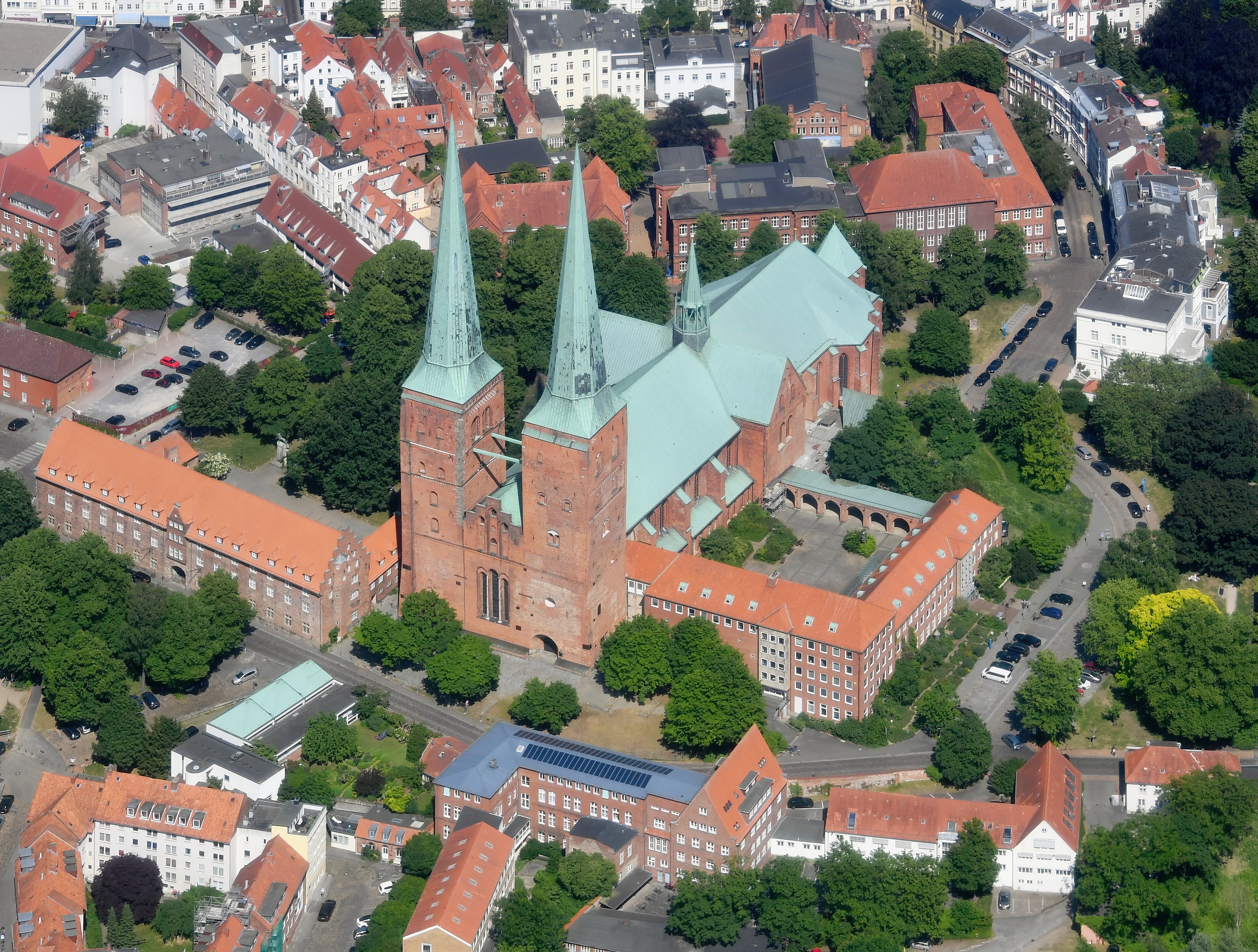
Lübeck Cathedral

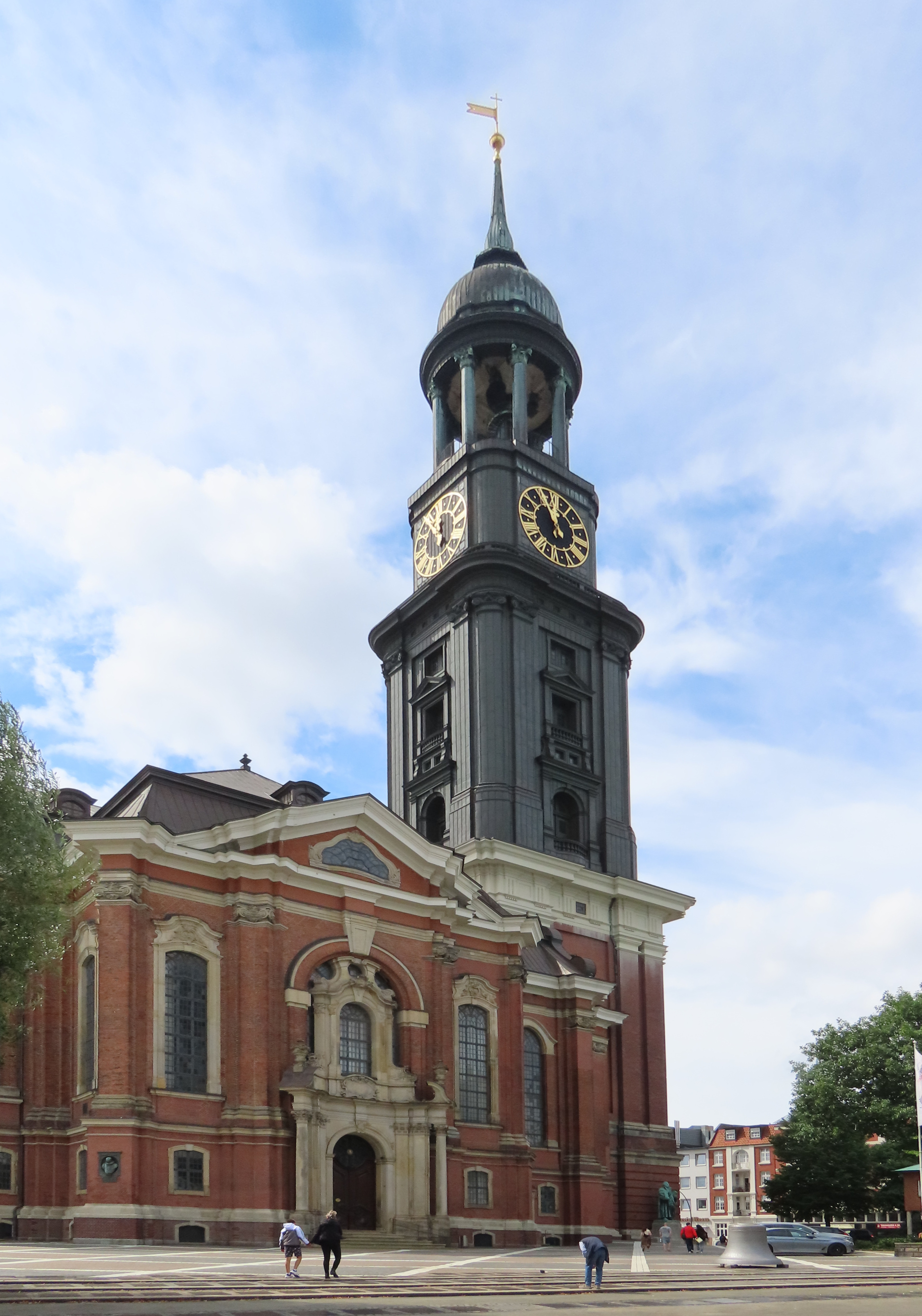
St. Michael's Church, Hamburg

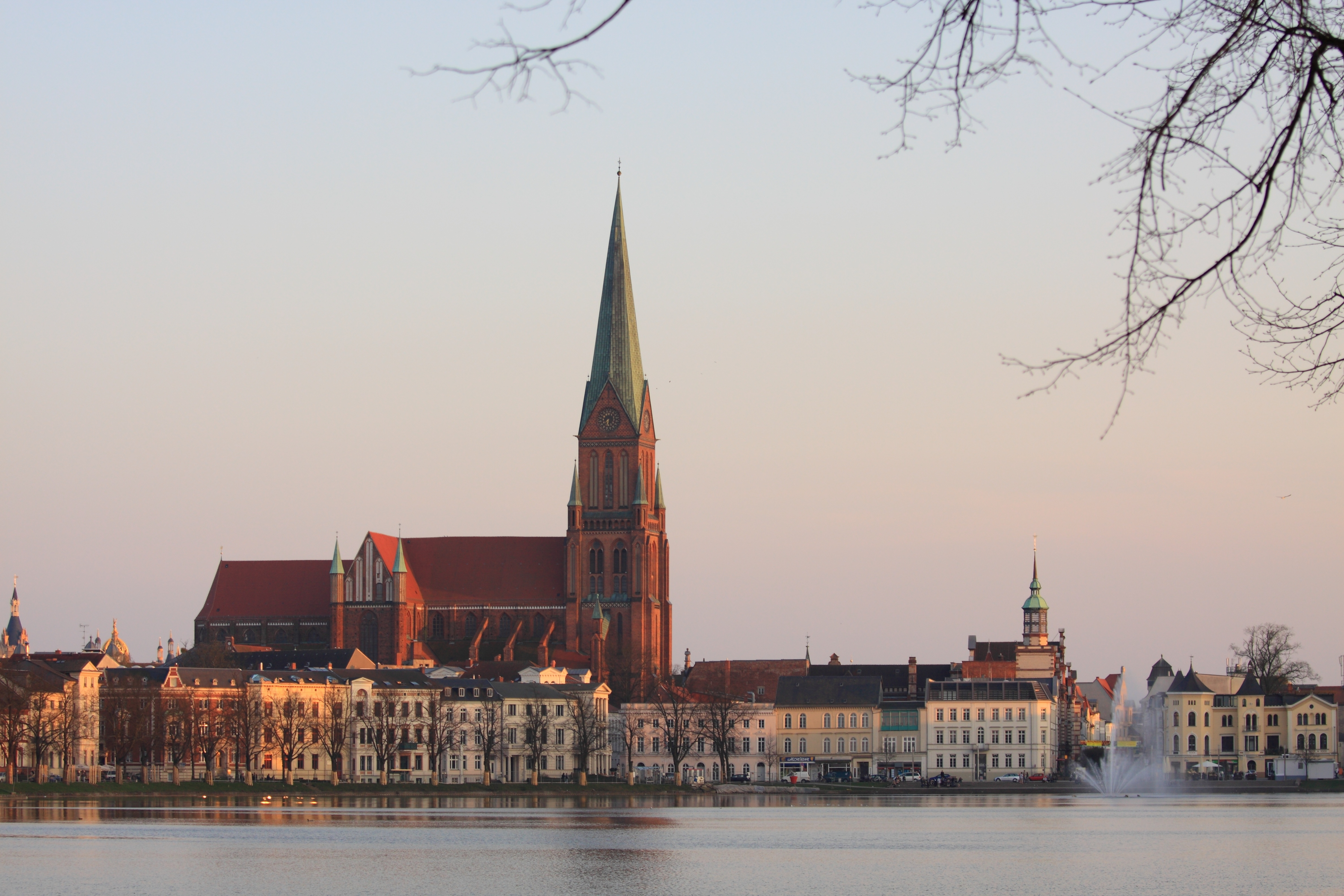
Schwerin Cathedral

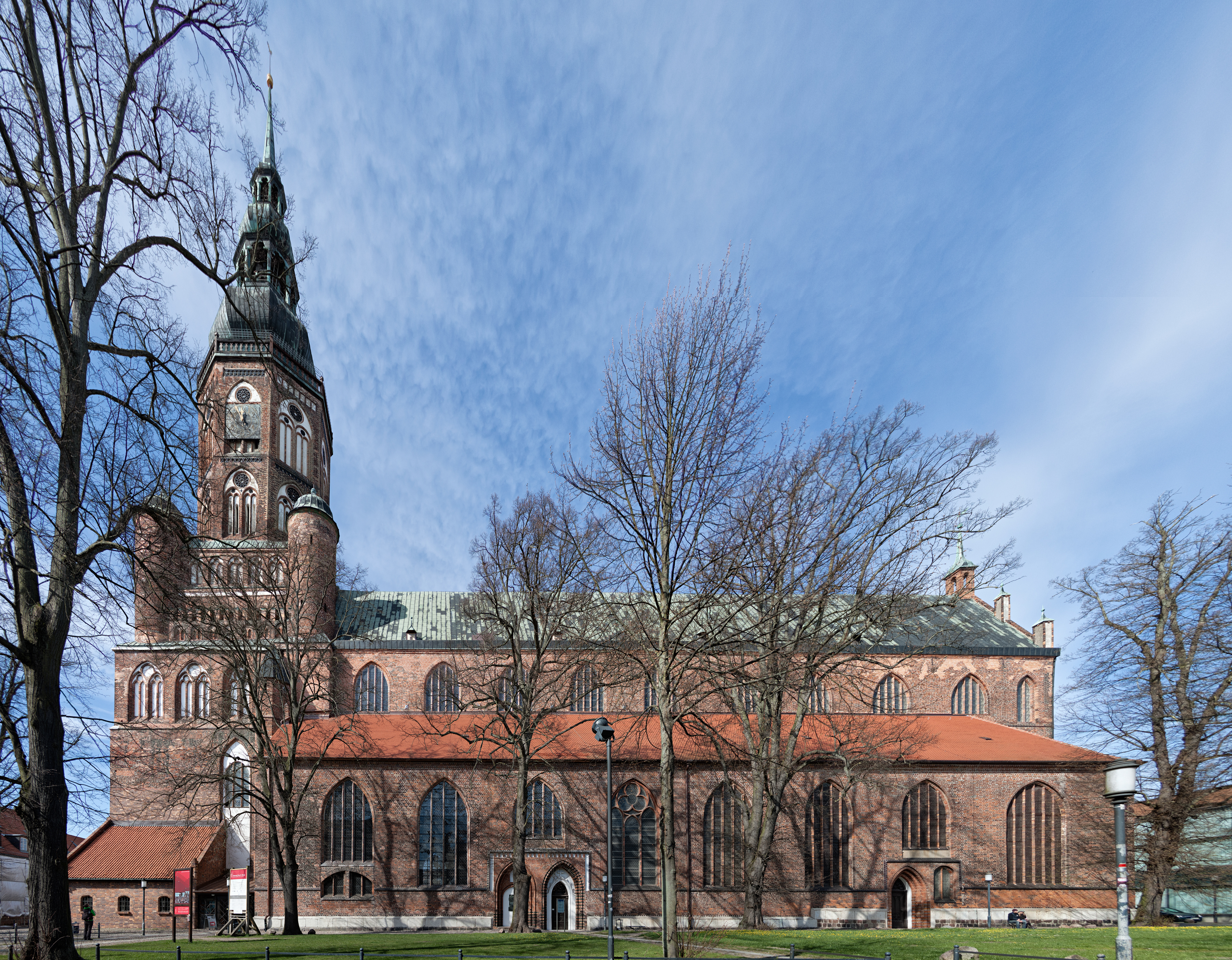
St. Nikolai, Greifswald

There are three dioceses (German: Sprengel). They consist of total 13 districts (German: Kirchenkreise). Each diocese is led by a bishop in the diocese (German:Bischof im Sprengel).

Sprengel Schleswig und Holstein (Diocese of Schleswig and Holstein) covers the state of Schleswig-Holstein without some parts of Southern Holstein (larger urban zone of Hamburg), Lübeck and the Duchy of Lauenburg. The parishes in Nordschleswig (Danish: Nordslesvig) in Southern Denmark (Jutland) also belong to the Diocese of Schleswig and Holstein. The current bishop is Gothard Magaard. He has his see in Schleswig Cathedral.

- Kirchenkreis Altholstein
- Kirchenkreis Dithmarschen
- Kirchenkreis Nordfriesland
- Kirchenkreis Ostholstein
- Kirchenkreis Plön-Segeberg
- Kirchenkreis Rantzau-Münsterdorf
- Kirchenkreis Rendsburg-Eckernförde
- Kirchenkreis Schleswig-Flensburg
- Parishes of German-speaking minority in Southern Jutland (South of Denmark).

Sprengel Hamburg und Lübeck (Diocese of Hamburg and Lübeck) covers the cities of Hamburg and Lübeck, some parts of Southern Holstein and the Duchy of Lauenburg. The current bishop is Kirsten Fehrs. She has her see in St. Michael's Church, Hamburg.

- Kirchenkreis Hamburg-Ost
- Kirchenkreis Hamburg-West/Südholstein
- Kirchenkreis Lübeck-Lauenburg

Sprengel Mecklenburg und Pommern (Diocese of Mecklenburg and Pommern) covers the state of Mecklenburg-Vorpommern. Until spring of 2019 there have been two bishop because of the latest merger of the Nordkirche: Dr Andreas von Malzahn (Schwerin) and Dr Hans-Jürgen Abromeit (Greifswald). The current bishop is Tilman Jeremias. He has his see in St. Nikolai, Greifswald.

- Kirchenkreis Mecklenburg
- Kirchenkreis Pommern

== List of bishops ==
Presiding Bishop (Landesbischof resp. Landesbischöfin)

- 2012-2019: Gerhard Ulrich
- since 2019: Kristina Kühnbaum-Schmidt

Bishop in the Diocese of Schleswig and Holstein

- since 2012: Gothard Magaard

Bishop in the Diocese of Hamburg and Lübeck

- since 2012: Kirsten Fehrs

Bishop in the Diocese of Mecklenburg and Pommern

- 2012-2019: Dr Andreas von Maltzahn (based in Schwerin)
- 2012-2019: Dr Hans-Jürgen Abromeit (based in Greifswald)
- Since 2019: Tilman Jeremias

== Organisation ==
The Sprengel of Mecklenburg und Pommern got two bishops because of the latest merger of the former regional churches of Mecklenburg and Pommern with Nordelbien. After a period of transition there will only be one bishop for the Sprengel (spring 2019). The headquarters (Landeskirchenamt) are in Kiel and in Schwerin. Each Sprengel is structured into many districts ("Kirchenkreise"); there are 13 districts. The Kirchenkreis is the unit of some parishes.

Instruments of organisation are:

- Landessynode (general synod; literally: State Synod); praeses: Ulrike Hillmann. The synod consists of both, clergy and lay people. The Landessynode regularly meets in Lübeck.

The synod is led by the praeses.

2012-2018: Dr Andreas Tietze
since 2018: Ulrike Hillmann

- Landeskirchenamt (church administrative office); president: Prof Dr Peter Unruh. The Landeskirchenamt is based in Kiel and in Schwerin.
- Bischofsrat (bishops' council). The Bischofsrat consist of all bishops of Nordkirche. The chair is the Presiding Bishop.
- Kirchenleitung (church executive board). The Kirchenleitung consists of all bishops and of representatives of clergy, lay people and staff. The chair is the Presiding Bishop.

== Ecumenism ==
The Centre for Global Ministries and Ecumenical Relations (Zentrum für Mission und Ökumene, ZMÖ) is based in Breklum, North Frisia (head office) and in Hamburg (staffed office). It cares about all international and ecumenical relationships of Nordkirche. It has its roots in Breklum's missionary society, founded in 1876 by pastor Christian Jensen. They prepared and sent missionaries to India and to the US, then also to Tanzania, China and Papua-Neuguinea.

== Diaconia ==
There are three Diakonische Werke (Protestant relief, development and social service organisations) in each federal state:

- Diakonisches Werk Schleswig-Holstein (HQ in Rendsburg). Total number of staff: 28,000.
- Diakonisches Werk Hamburg (HQ in Hamburg). Total number of staff: 18,000.
- Diakonisches Werk Mecklenburg-Vorpommern (HQ in Schwerin). Total number of staff: 11,000.

All three Diakonische Werke are member of Diakonie Deutschland, which is the umbrella organisation of all federal Diakonische Werke. Each federal Diakonisches Werk is led by a Landespastor (State Pastor).

== Practices and life of the church ==
Ordination of women and blessing of same-sex marriages were allowed. Maria Jepsen was the first woman worldwide who became female bishop. She served as bishop of the former diocese (Sprengel) of Hamburg from 1992 to 2010.

The denomination is involved in practical work in rural areas and has spoken out about climate justice.

== Academics ==
Universities

Nordkirche doesn't run any university, but there are four state faculties of theology in the area of Nordkirche:

- Kiel, in the State of Schleswig-Holstein
- Hamburg, in the City and State of Hamburg
- Rostock, in the State of Mecklenburg-Vorpommern
- Greifswald, in the State of Mecklenburg-Vorpommern

The relations between universities, faculties, federal states and Nordkirche are written down in Contracts between States and Church. Students of theology finish their studies with 1. Kirchliches Examen.

Predigerseminar

Predigerseminar (literally: preachers' seminary) is based in the old Ratzeburg Cathedral and Monastery. Vicars (a vicar is a pastor in training) are educated there between university studies and ordination. A vicar (German: Vikar) is a candidate for ordained pastoral ministry, serving in a Vikariat (internship) Vikariat dures 2.5 years. Vicars are trained in three places: Predigerseminar in Ratzeburg, parish and school. Vikariat is the practical part of education after theoretical studies at university. Vicars finish their education with 2. Kirchliches Examen.
