= Bärbel Wartenberg-Potter =

German theologian (born 1943)

- Born: Bärbel Reinhard; 16 September 1943 (age 82); Pirmasens, Rhenish Palatinate, Germany
- Other names: Bärbel von Wartenberg-Potter
- Occupation: theologian/pastor
- Years active: 1970–2008
- Known for: 3rd woman to become a Bishop of a Lutheran church in Germany
- Spouse(s): (1) Wolfgang von Wartenberg (2) Philip Potter (m 1985)
- Children: 2

Bärbel Wartenberg-Potter (also known as Bärbel von Wartenberg-Potter) (born 1943) is a German theologian. After serving as director over programs for women and children with the World Council of Churches, teaching theology in Jamaica, and serving a pastorate in Stuttgart, Wartenberg-Potter became the president of the Council of Christian Churches in Germany. In 2001 she began a seven-year term as the third woman serving as a Bishop of a Lutheran Church in Germany.

== Biography ==
Bärbel Wartenberg was born on 16 September 1943 in Pirmasens, Rhenish Palatinate, Germany. In 1963, she began her university education graduating in 1968 with a master's degree in German languages and literature and a teaching degree. Wartenberg passed her theological examination for the Lutheran Evangelical Church in Württemberg. Between 1970 and 1972, she participated in mission and development work with the Evangelical-Catholic Association. The experience with both her children dying young (7 months and 2 years old) from an autoimmune disease made her campaign the initiative „Kind im Krankenhaus“ (i.e. child in the hospital) between 1974 and 1976 in order to allow parents staying with their hospitalised children. Her first marriage broke down in grief and pain. Attaining her master's degree in Theology, in 1976, she became the director at the Centre for Development Education in Stuttgart. She was ordained as a pastor in 1980 and served as a regional pastor in Württemberg for three years. Between 1983 and 1986 she was the director of the Programme for Women in Church and Society of the World Council of Churches (WCC) in Geneva, Switzerland. During that time, in 1985, she married Philip Potter, a minister and theologian who was the Secretary General of the WCC.

After her second marriage, and until 1990, Wartenberg-Potter taught at the United Theological College of the West Indies in Kingston, Jamaica. In 1991, she returned to Germany and served as a parish pastor in Stuttgart-Botnang through 1996. In 1997, she became president of the Council of Christian Churches in Germany (German: Arbeitsgemeinschaft Christlicher Kirchen in Deutschland) (ACKD) in Frankfurt. In 2000, she was elected as a bishop of the Holstein-Lübeck diocese for the North Elbian Evangelical Lutheran Church. Her election was the third of a woman in Germany to the position of Lutheran bishop and she was assigned to the Lübeck Cathedral. Wartenberg-Potter assumed the post in 2001 and retired in 2008. In 2009, she joined the Institute for Theological Zoology as the Chairman of the Board of Trustees.

== Selected works ==
- Wartenberg, Bärbel von (1973). Schwarz kann nicht ziehen 1. Werkbuch zum Thema Rassismus am Beispiel Südafrikas für den Bereich Schule und Erwachsenenbildung (in German). Stuttgart: Evangelisches Missionswerk in Südwestdeutschland.
- Wartenberg, Bärbel von (1973). Schwarz kann nicht ziehen 2. Methodische Anregungen für Lehrer und Veranstalter (in German). Stuttgart: Evangelisches Missionswerk in Südwestdeutschland.
- Wartenberg, Bärbel von; Wartenberg, Wolfgang von (1975). Südafrika: Schwarzer Widerstand, weisse Herrschaft: ein Handbuch (in German). Nürnberg: Laetare.
- Wartenberg, Bärbel von; Albrecht, Gisela (1978). Südafrika: Materialien und Dokumente; Beiheft zu den Diaserien "Zorn aus den Townships", "... und nähme doch Schaden an seiner Seele" (in German). Stuttgart: Evangelisches Missionswerk in Südwestdeutschland.
- Moltmann-Wendel, Elisabeth; Weitemeyer, Erika; Wartenberg, Bärbel von (1981). Frauen: (aus der Arbeit der Evangelischen Akademie Hofgeismar) (in German). Hofgeismar: Evangelische Akademie.
- Wartenberg, Bärbel von (April 1982). "Adam and Eve, Where Are You?: Introduction". The Ecumenical Review. 34 (2): 159–162. doi:10.1111/j.1758-6623.1982.tb03351.x.
- Wartenberg, Bärbel von (1982). "Adam und Eva, wo seid ihr?: "Die Studie über die Gemeinschaft von Frauen und Männern in der Kirche" auf ihrem Weg von Sheffield nach Vancouver: Versuch einer Bestandsaufnahme". Ökumenische Rundschau (in German). 31: 340–344.
- Wartenberg-Potter, Bärbel von (1986). Wir werden unsere Harfen nicht an die Weiden hängen: Engagement und Spiritualität (in German). Stuttgart: Kreuz Verlag. ISBN 978-378-3-10815-6.
- Pobee, John S; Wartenberg-Potter, Bärbel von (1986). New eyes for reading: biblical and theological reflections by women from the third world. Geneva: World Council of Churches. ISBN 978-282-5-40863-6.
- Wartenberg-Potter, Bärbel von (1989). Die Reise der Pachamama: eine theologishce Erzählung (in German). Stuttgart: Kreuz Verlag. ISBN 978-378-3-10978-8.
- Wartenberg-Potter, Bärbel von (2004). Was tust du, fragt der Engel: Mystik im Alltag (in German). Freiburg im Breisgau: Herder. ISBN 978-345-1-05450-1.
- Wartenberg-Potter, Bärbel von (2007). Wes Brot ich ess, des Lied ich sing die Bergpredigt lesen; mit dem Text der "Bibel in gerechter Sprache" (in German). Freiburg im Breisgau: Herder. ISBN 978-345-1-29238-5.

Bärbel Wartenberg-Potter Born: 16 September 1943 in Pirmasens
Titles in Lutheranism
Preceded by Karl Ludwig Kohlwage as Bishop of the Holstein-Lübeck Ambit within the NELK	Bishop of the Holstein-Lübeck Ambit within the North Elbian Evangelical Lutheran Church (NELK); 2001–2008	Succeeded by Maria Jepsen as Bishop of the Hamburg and Lübeck Ambit within the NELK
