= Johannes Aepinus =

German theologian (1499–1553)

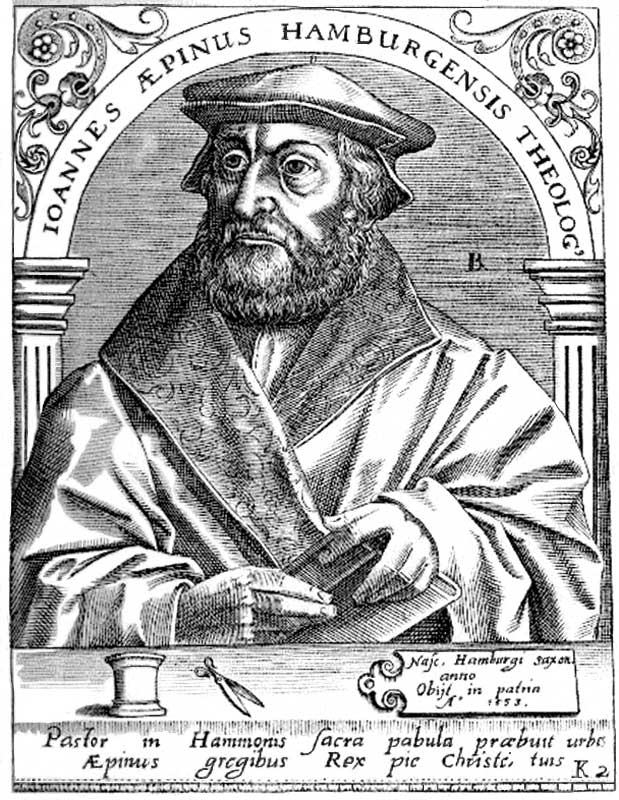
Johannes Aepinus.

Johannes Aepinus (Johann Hoeck) (1499–1553) was a German Lutheran theologian, the first Superintendent of Hamburg from 1532 to 1553, presiding as spiritual leader over the Lutheran state church of Hamburg.

== Life ==
He was born at Ziesar or Ziegesar, then the capital of the Prince-Bishopric of Brandenburg (now Brandenburg). He was under the instruction of Johannes Bugenhagen. He took his bachelor's degree at Wittenberg in 1520; here he became the friend of Martin Luther and Philip Melanchthon. Then he had a school in Brandenburg upon Havel, but was imprisoned for his reforming activity, and had to leave home. He then adopted the modified form of the Greek word αἰπεινός (aipeinos) ("lofty"), by which he is generally known, and which he claimed was a translation of his real name (Hoeck = hoch).

He spent some time in Pomerania, in close relations with the leaders of the Protestant Reformation there. From about 1524 to 1528 he was in Stralsund, in charge of a school. The local authorities asked him to draw up an order of ecclesiastical discipline, which went into effect on 5 November 1525. In October 1529, he succeeded Johann Boldewan as pastor of St. Peter's Church, Hamburg; he helped introduce Bugenhagen's order of discipline in the city. His contest with the cathedral chapter, still Catholic, gave rise to his Pinacidion de Romanæ ecclesiæ imposturis (1530). On 18 May 1532 he was appointed to the highest office in the Lutheran State Church of the city-state, that of superintendent according to Bugenhagen's order of discipline.

In 1534 he visited England at the request of Henry VIII to advise him on his divorce and the Reformation. Aepinus was not able to convince the king to model the English Reformation after the Augsburg Confession, yet he managed to earn the respect of leaders such as Thomas Cromwell. He returned to Hamburg in the following January, and subsequently made numerous journeys as a representative of the city; he took part in all the church movements of the time. He gave weekly theological lectures, usually in Latin, and spent much time on the Psalms.

He is best known by the controversy which arose over his teaching on the descent of Christ into Hell. In 1542, finding that the article of the creed on this subject was frequently explained as meaning no more than the going down into the grave, in his lecture on Psalm 16, he put forward the view, already given in Luther's explanation of the Psalms, that Christ had really gone down into Hell, to deliver men from its power. Johannes Garcaeus the elder, his successor at St. Peter's, called him to account for this teaching, but left Hamburg in the following year and did not return until 1546. Meantime Aepinus's commentary on Psalm 16 had been published by his assistant Johann Freder, so that his view was widely known. The controversy became serious after Garcaeus' return, and both sides sought to gain support from Wittenberg. Melanchthon could only say that there was no agreement among the doctors on this point. Aepinus' opponents in Hamburg were so turbulent that their leaders were deprived of their offices and banished from the city in 1551.

He died in Hamburg on 13 May 1553. His ordinances for the Lutheran Hamburg state church seem to have remained in force until 1603.

== Sources ==
Johannes Aepinus Born: 1499 in Ziesar Died: 13 May 1553 in Hamburg
Titles in Lutheranism
Hamburg's Lutheran State Church newly established in 1529	Superintendent of Hamburg for the Lutheran State Church; 1532–1553	Vacant Title next held by Paul von Eitzen
