= Kristina Kühnbaum-Schmidt =

German Lutheran bishop (born 1964)

The Right Reverend Kristina Kühnbaum-Schmidt
- Bishop of Northern Germany
- Church: Evangelical Lutheran Church in Northern Germany
- Appointed: 2019
- Predecessor: Gerhard Ulrich

Orders
- Ordination: 1995
- Consecration: 1 April 2019 by Gerhard Ulrich

Personal details
- Born: 24 September 1964 (age 61) Braunschweig, Germany
- Spouse: Güntzel Schmidt
- Children: 1

Kristina Kühnbaum-Schmidt (born 1964) is a German Lutheran bishop.

== Biography ==
Kühnbaum-Schmidt was born in Braunschweig. She studied Lutheran evangelical theology at University of Göttingen and at Kirchliche Hochschule Berlin.

She was ordained in Braunschweig in 1995, and served as a pastor of the parish of Wichern and in the Propstei pastorate for public relations. From 2009, Kühnbaum-Schmidt also worked as a pastoral psychological consultant and supervisor for the Evangelical Lutheran Church in Braunschweig and as a lecturer for pastoral care.

In 2013, Kühnbaum-Schmidt was elected regional bishop of the Meiningen-Suhl provost in the Evangelical Church in Central Germany (EKM). On September 27, 2018, the synod of the Evangelical Lutheran Church in Northern Germany elected her as presiding bishop (Landesbischöfin), and she took over the position on April 1, 2019.

In December 2018, Kühnbaum-Schmidt was elected deputy chair of the German National Committee of the Lutheran World Federation (DNK / LWF). On November 7, 2019, the Bishops' Conference of the United Evangelical Lutheran Church of Germany (VELKD) elected her as Deputy Leading Bishop.

== Works ==
- „...aber mit Fantasie und Tatkraft wird man da vieles neu erobern können.“ Der lange Weg zur Frauenordination in der Braunschweigischen Landeskirche. In: Mit Phantasie und Tatkraft. 30 Jahre Frauenordination in der Ev.-luth. Landeskirche in Braunschweig. editor Ulrike Block-von Schwartz im Auftrag des Landeskirchenamtes der Ev.-luth. Landeskirche Braunschweig, Braunschweig 1998, p. 9–61.
- Kurzbiografien Dorothea Sophie Hamann, Doris Gassmann. in: Hannelore Erhart (Hrsg.): Lexikon früher evangelischer Theologinnen. Biographische Skizzen. Neukirchen 2005.
- Eine Gesprächsgruppe für Kriegskinder der Jahrgänge 1930 bis 1945. in: Transformationen. Pastoralpsychologische Werkstattberichte 11 (2009), p. 72–133.
- Der Wunsch nach Gedenken und der Schmerz der Erinnerung. in: Dieter Rammler/ Michael Strauß (ed.): Kirchenbau im Nationalsozialismus. Beispiele aus der Braunschweigischen Landeskirche. Braunschweig 2009, p. 74–86.
  auch in: Transformationen 13 (2010/11)
- Frauen in der Braunschweigischen Kirchengeschichte. in: Von der Taufe der Sachsen zur Kirche in Niedersachsen. Geschichte der Evangelisch-lutherischen Landeskirche in Braunschweig. editor Prof. Dr. Friedrich Weber, Birgit Hofmann, Hans-Jürgen Engelking, Braunschweig 2010, p. 601–625.
