= Johann Melchior Goeze =

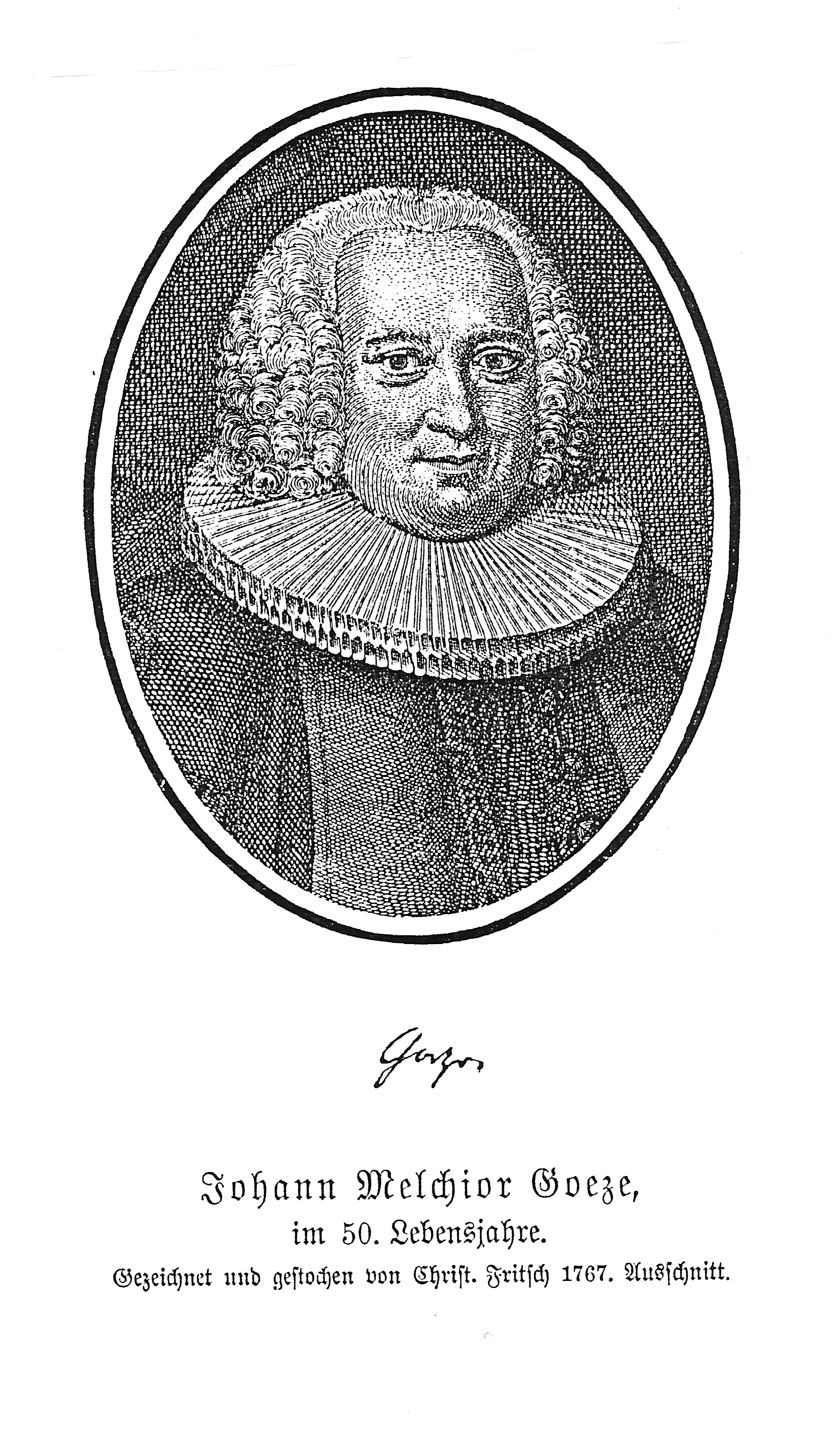
Johann Melchior Goeze

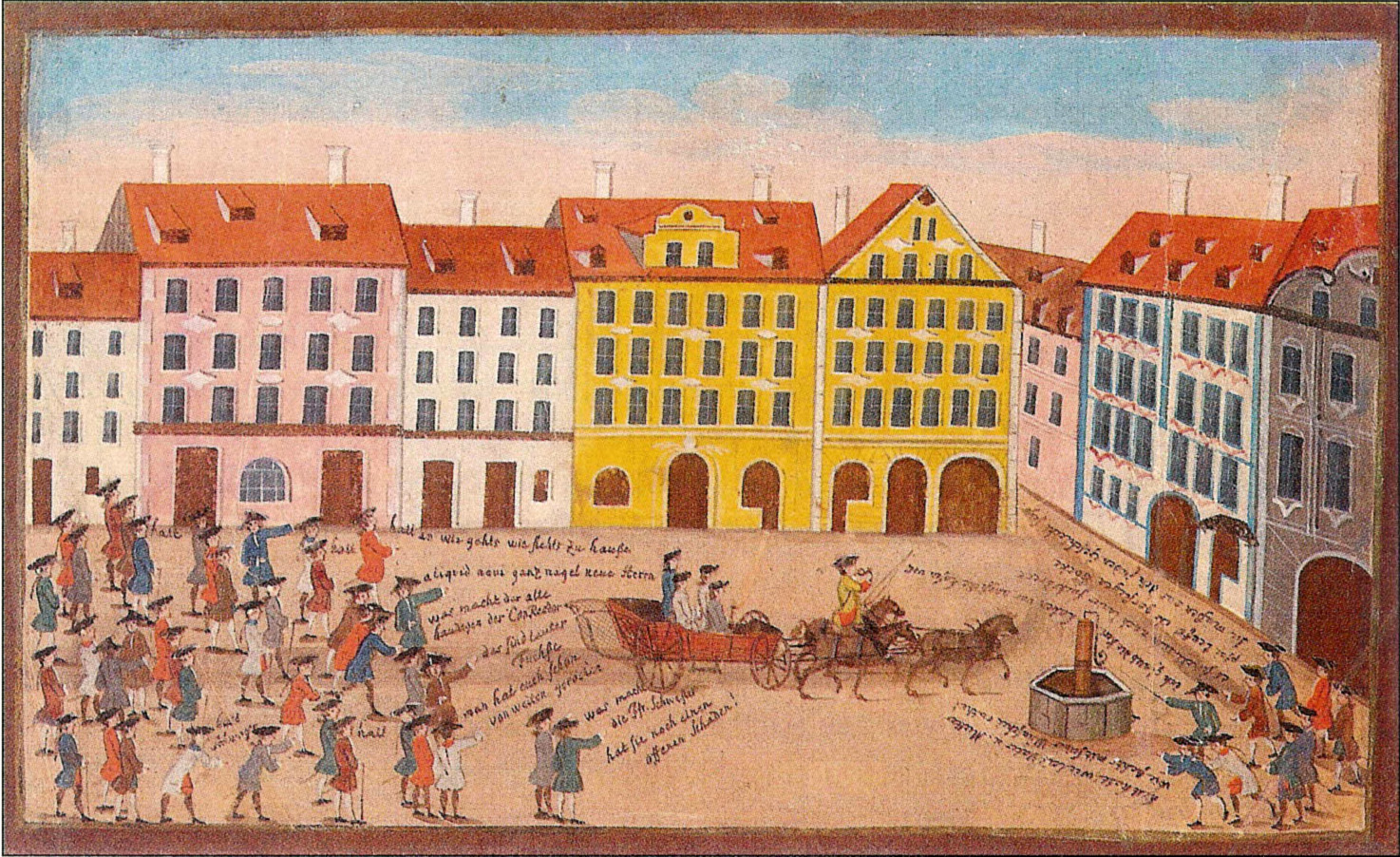
University of Jena at 1770.

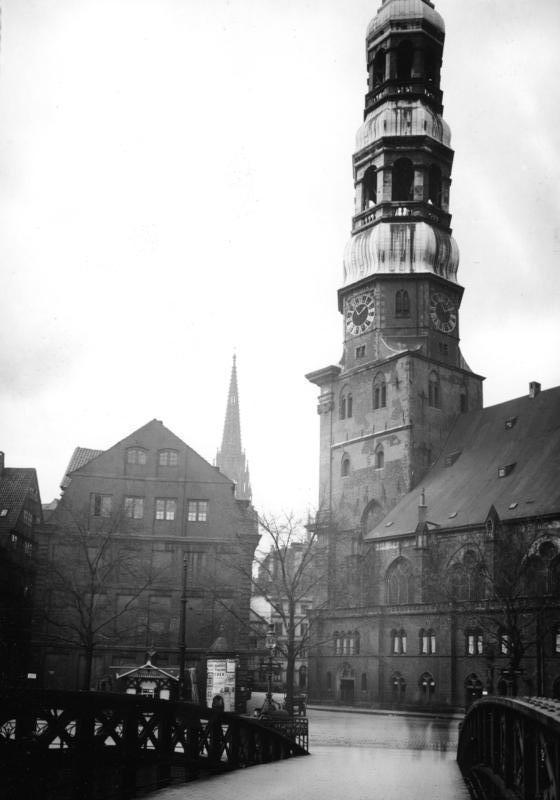
St. Catherine's Church, Hamburg in 1930. The church was damaged by the bombing in World War II and rebuilt afterwards.

Johann Melchior Goeze (born 16 October 1717 in Halberstadt, died 19 May 1786 in Hamburg, epithet: Zionswächter, i.e. Zion's Guardian) was a Lutheran pastor and theologian during the period of Late Orthodoxy. From 1760 to 1770 he served as senior of Hamburg presiding as spiritual leader over the Lutheran state church of the city-state.

== Life ==
Goeze studied in the universities of Jena and Halle, writing a doctoral dissertation on early Christian apologetics. In 1741, he became the pastor in Aschersleben, Principality of Halberstadt. In 1750, he took his ministry to Magdeburg, Duchy of Magdeburg, and from 1755 onwards he served as the pastor at St. Catherine's in Hamburg. The pastors of the five principal or head churches (Hauptkirchen) of Hamburg formed a college, the Spiritual Ministerium, and elected from their midst the spiritual leader of the Lutheran state church. In 1760 his colleagues elected Goeze senior of Hamburg.

Goeze was familiar with literature and took up writing histories and apologetics. The latter led him to write against various proponents of the Enlightenment. In 1764, he wrote against Johann Bernhard Basedow, in 1769, against Johann Georg Schlosser, in 1771 against Johann Salomo Semler, the founder of the historical critical method, in 1773, against Karl Friedrich Bahrdt, and in 1769 against Julius Gustav Alberti, the first Rationalist pastor in Hamburg. The next year, in 1770, he published his best work, The True Nature of Religious Zeal.

Goeze became well known chiefly for his debate with Gotthold Ephraim Lessing from 1777 to 1781. Goeze urged him to repentance, but little came out of the debate. Lessing responded with a number of rather polemical texts, finally resulting in Lessing being prohibited from writing on religious matters. Privately, Lessing showed respect for Goeze by always making sure to visit him when he came to Hamburg.

== Works ==
- Erneuertes Andenken der im Jahr 1659, den 3ten Febr. glücklich vollendeten Wiederherstellung des Thurms und der Hauptkirche zu St. Catharinen in Hamburg : welche im Jahr 1648, den 15ten Februar, durch einen erschröcklichen Sturmwind zerbrochen und verwüstet worden : Durch eine Dank- und Gedächtnis-Predigt (homily of 1759 to contemplate the reconstruction of the storm-wrecked tower of St. Catherine's in 1659), Hamburg: 1759. OCLC 190825183 (in German)
- „Goezes Streitschriften gegen Lessing“ (Goeze's debate writings against Lessing), in: Deutsche Litteraturdenkemale 43/45, Stuttgart: G.J. Goschen'sche Verlangshandlung, 1893, 208 pages. (Google Books) (in German)
- Etwas vorläufiges gegen des Herrn Hofraths Lessings mittelbare und unmittelbare feindselige Angriffe auf unsre allerheiligste Religion und auf den einigen Lehrgrund derselben, die heilige Schrift (a small, tentative response against Mr. Hofrath Lessing's direct and indirect hostile attack on our most holy religion and on the sole basis of its teachings, the Holy Scriptures), Hamburg: D.A. Harmsen, 1778. (Google Books) (in German)
- Die wichtigsten Abschnitte der Lehre vom Tode: In einigen heiligen Reden abgehandelt (The most important sections of the doctrine of death, dealt with in some sacred discourses), Breslau and Leipzig: Korn, 1753. (Google Books) (in German)
- Heilsame Betrachtungen des Todes und der Ewigkeit, auf alle Tage des Jahres (Salutary considerations on mortality and eternity, on all days of the year), Breslau and Leipzig: Korn, 1767. (Google Books for Vol. 1 and Google Books for Vol. 2) (in German)
- Heilsame Betrachtungen der Geschichte des grossen Leydens und Versönungs-Todes Jesu Christi auf alle Tage des Jahrs: Vier Theile (Salutary reflections of the history of the great suffering and atoning death of Jesus Christ on all days of the year: in four parts), Mevius, 1760. 544 pages. (Google Books for January–May, Google Books for April–June, Google Books for July–September, Google Books for October–December) (in German)
- Eine Probe von der Art, wie der Herr D. Semler seine Zeugen anzuführen pflegt: Kennern und Freunden der Wahrheit zur unpartheyischen Beurtheilung, und zur Erweckung, zum Vortheile der Wahrheit und der Religion, ähnliche Untersuchungen anzustellen (An investigation of the manner in which Dr. Semler is accustomed to present his sources: to induce knowers and friends of truth to an impartial judgment, to the awakening, to conduct similar studies for the benefit of truth and religion), Hamburg: Bode, 1771, 32 pages. (Google Books) (in German)
- Die Grosse Lehre von dem Junglten Gerichte, in Einige Heiligen Reden Abgehandelt (The Great Teaching of the Young Judgement, in Some Sacred Discourses Dealt With), Breslau and Leipzig: Published by Johann Jacob Korn, 1751, 586 pages. (in German)

Johann Melchior Goeze Born: 16 October 1717 in Halberstadt Died: 19 May 1786 in Hamburg
Titles in Lutheranism
| Preceded by Friedrich Wagner | Senior of Hamburg for the Lutheran State Church; 1760–1770 | Succeeded by Georg Ludwig Herrnschmidt |
