= Goeke =

Goeke is a surname. Notable people with the surname include:

- J. Henry Goeke (1869–1930), American politician
- Joseph Robert Goeke (born 1950), American judge
- Leo Goeke (1937–2012), American operatic tenor

== See also ==
- Goeze
