= Maria Jepsen =

German bishop

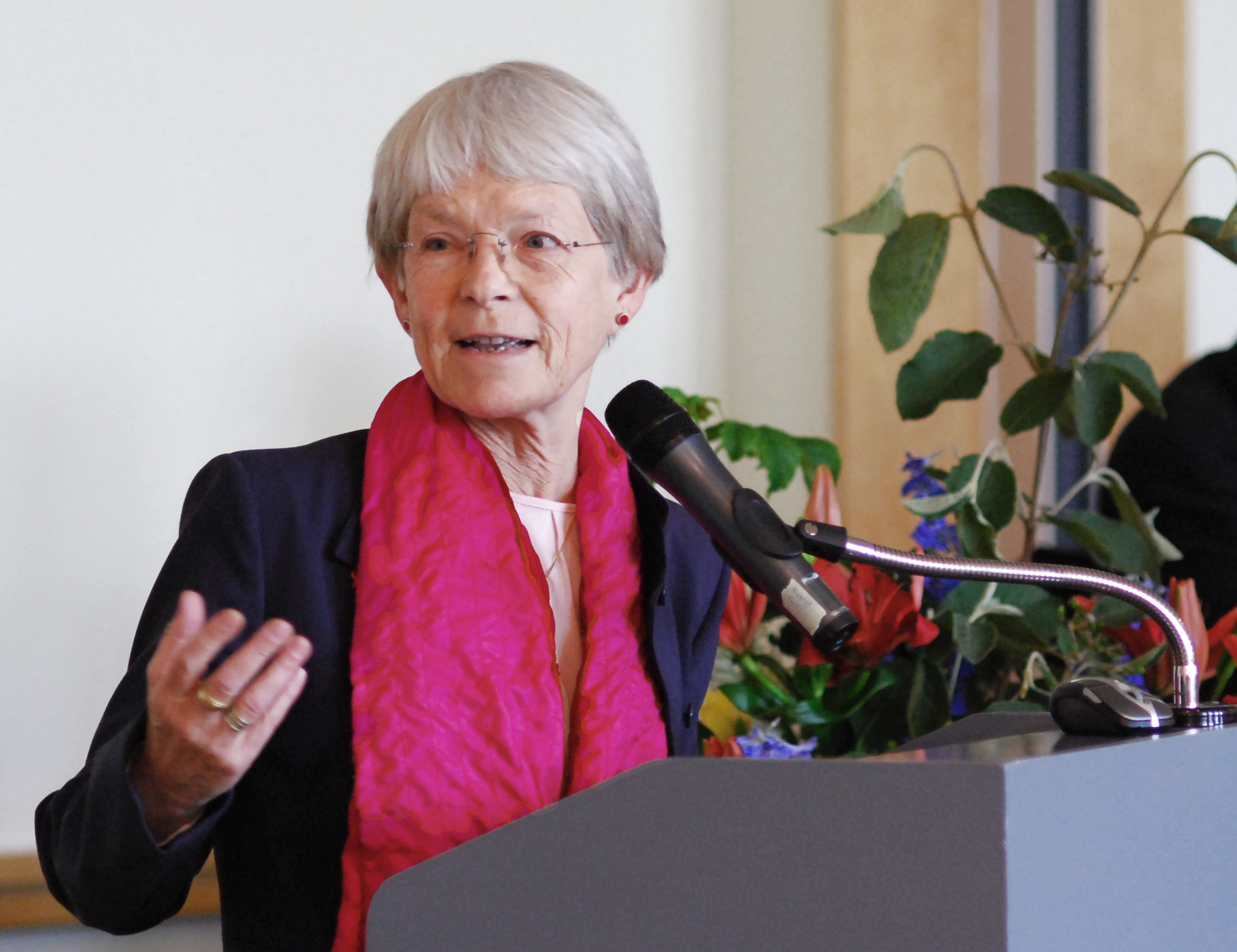
Maria Jepsen

Maria Jepsen (born 19 January 1945, in Bad Segeberg) is the former bishop of Hamburg in the North Elbian Evangelical Lutheran Church. On 4 April 1992 the synod of the Hamburg Ambit elected her bishop and sworn on 30 August that year, becoming the first Lutheran woman to be a bishop worldwide, and since then she has been re-elected for a second ten-year period.

On 16 July 2010 she resigned due to allegations that she did not act on information about an abuse case in her ambit of the church in 1999.

Maria Jepsen Born: 19 January 1945 in Bad Segeberg
Titles in Lutheranism
Preceded by Peter Krusche	Bishop of the Hamburg Ambit within the North Elbian Evangelical Lutheran Church; 1992–2008	Succeeded by herself in an extended ambit
Preceded by herself in a smaller ambit and Bärbel Wartenberg-Potter as Bishop of the Holstein-Lübeck Ambit	Bishop of the Hamburg and Lübeck Ambit within the North Elbian Evangelical Lutheran Church; 2008–2010	Vacant Title next held by Kirsten Fehrs
