= North Elbian Evangelical Lutheran Church =

Regional church in Northern Germany

Location of North Elbian Evangelical Lutheran Church

The North Elbian Evangelical Lutheran Church (German: Nordelbische Evangelisch-Lutherische Kirche; NEK) was a Lutheran regional church in Northern Germany which emerged from a merger of four churches in 1977 and merged with two more churches in 2012. The NEK largely covered the area of the states of Schleswig-Holstein and Hamburg where it was the most important Christian denomination. It had 2.1 million members (as of 2006) in 595 parishes, constituting 46% of the regional population.

In May 2012 the NEK, the Evangelical Lutheran Church of Mecklenburg and the Pomeranian Evangelical Church merged into Evangelical Lutheran Church in Northern Germany.

The NEK was a full member of the Protestant Church in Germany (Evangelische Kirche in Deutschland, EKD), the United Evangelical Lutheran Church of Germany (VELKD), and the Lutheran World Federation (joined 1977). The church was also a member of the Community of Protestant Churches in Europe.

== History ==
The North Elbian Evangelical Lutheran Church was founded in 1977 by the merger of four former state churches:

- the Evangelical Lutheran State Church of Eutin (German: Evangelisch-Lutherische Landeskirche Eutin), which had been split off from the Evangelical Lutheran Church in Oldenburg and represented the former Prince-Bishopric of Lübeck.
- the Evangelical Lutheran Church in the State of Hamburg (German: Evangelisch-Lutherische Kirche im Hamburgischen Staate);
- the Evangelical Lutheran Church in the State of Lübeck (German: Evangelisch-lutherische Kirche im Lübeckischen Staate);
- the Evangelical Lutheran State Church of Schleswig-Holstein; (German: Evangelisch-Lutherische Landeskirche Schleswig-Holsteins)

It is named after its ambit mostly located north of the River Elbe. In 1992 Maria Jepsen was the first woman to become a bishop in the North Elbian Evangelical Lutheran Church. At Pentecost 2012 it merged with the Evangelical Lutheran State Church of Mecklenburg and the Pomeranian Evangelical Church to form the new Evangelical Lutheran Church in Northern Germany.

== Prominent buildings ==
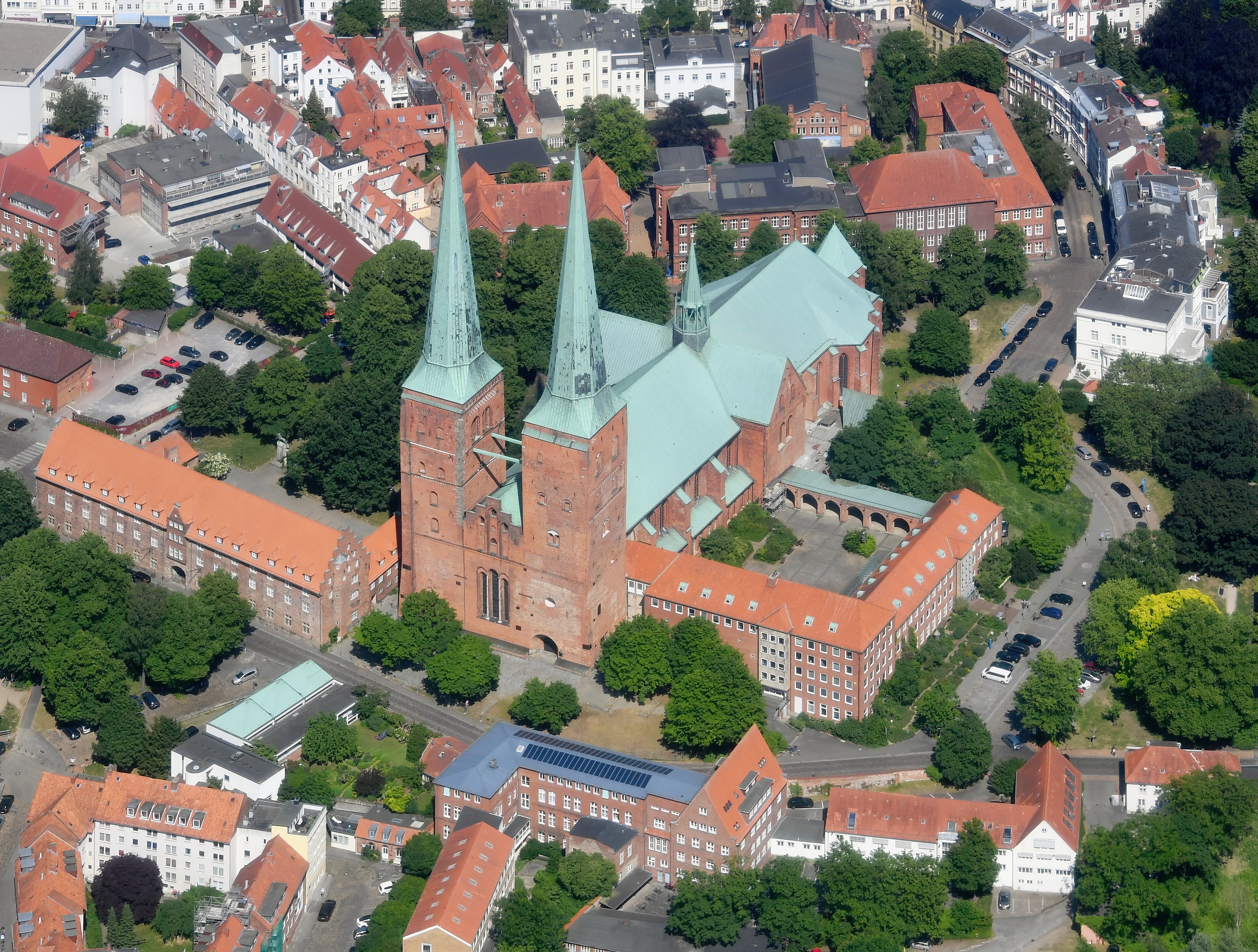
Lübeck Cathedral

The most prominent church buildings and sees of the bishops were Schleswig Cathedral, Lübeck Cathedral and St. Michaelis in Hamburg.

== Practices ==
Ordination of women and blessing of same-sex unions were allowed.

== List of bishops ==
=== Bishops of the Hamburg district (Sprengel Hamburg; 1977–2008) ===
The preaching venue of the bishop was the new St. Nicholas Church (till 1987) and thereafter St. Michael's.

- 1977–1983: Hans-Otto Wölber
- 1983–1992: Peter Krusche
- 1992–2008: Maria Jepsen

=== Bishops of the Holstein-Lübeck district (Sprengel Holstein-Lübeck; 1977–2008) ===
The preaching venue of the bishop was the Lübeck Cathedral.

- 1964–1981: Friedrich Hübner, until 1977 bishop of Holstein in Kiel for the Evangelical-Lutheran State Church of Schleswig-Holstein
- 1981–1991: Ulrich Wilckens
- 1991–2001: Karl Ludwig Kohlwage
- 2001–2008: Bärbel Wartenberg-Potter

=== Bishops of the Schleswig district (Sprengel Schleswig; 1977–2008) ===
The preaching venue of the bishop was the Schleswig Cathedral.

- 1967–1978: Alfred Petersen, until 1977 bishop of Schleswig for the Evangelical-Lutheran State Church of Schleswig-Holstein
- 1979–1990: Karlheinz Stoll
- 1991–2008: Hans-Christian Knuth
- 2008–today: Gerhard Ulrich

=== Bishops of the Hamburg and Lübeck district (Sprengel Hamburg und Lübeck; since 2008) ===
The preaching venue of the bishop is the St. Michaelis Church, Hamburg.

- 2008–2010: Maria Jepsen
- 2011–today: Kirsten Fehrs

=== Bishops of the Schleswig and Holstein district (Sprengel Schleswig und Holstein; since 2008) ===
The preaching venue of the bishop is the Schleswig Cathedral.

- 2008–2014: Gerhard Ulrich
- 2014–today: Gothart Magaard
