= Lübeck Cathedral =

Coordinates: 53°51′39″N 10°41′09″E

- Proto-Cathedral of Saints John the Baptist, Blaise, Mary, and Nicholas
- Lübecker Dom
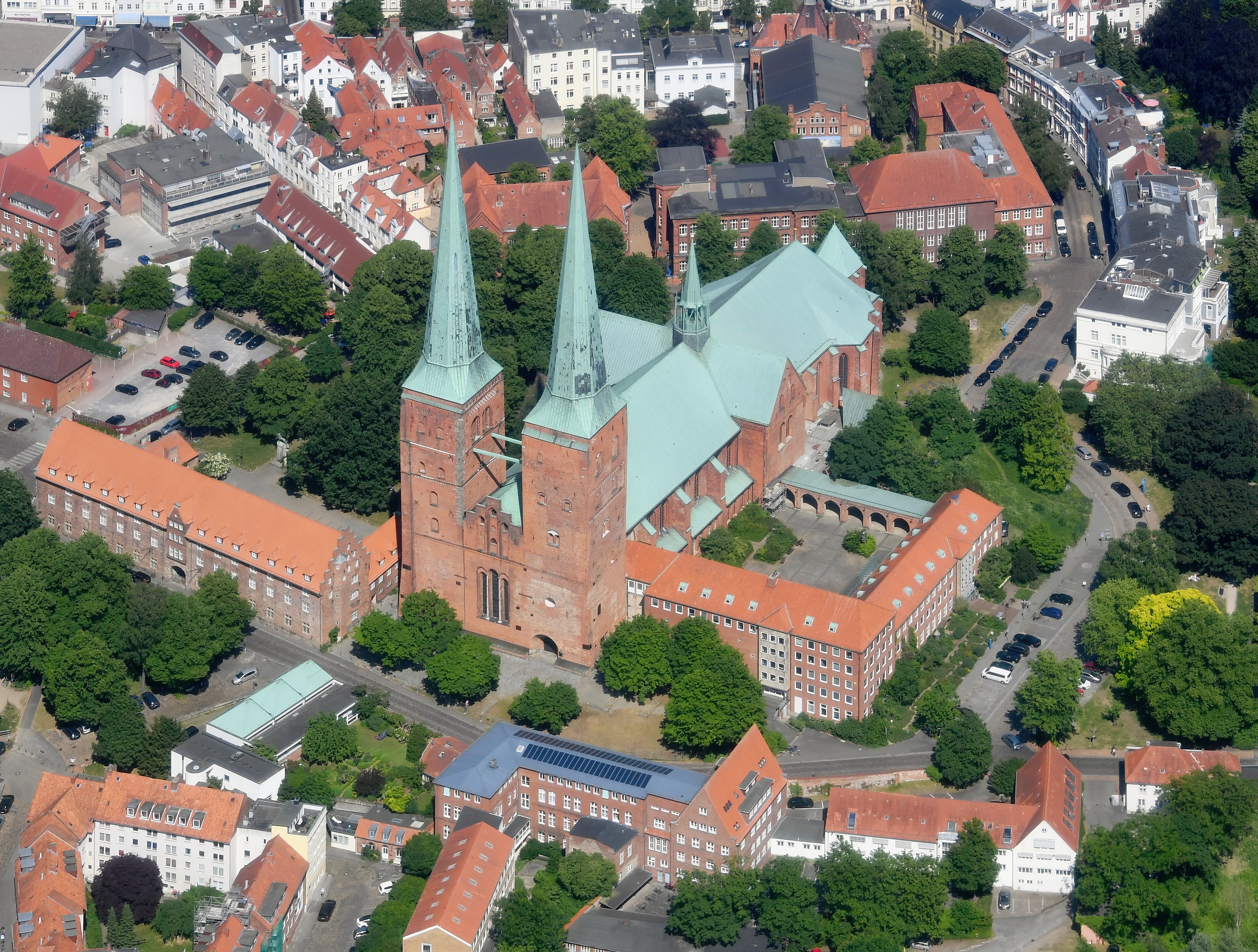
- Lübeck Cathedral
- Location: Altstadt, Lübeck, Schleswig-Holstein
- Country: Germany
- Denomination: Lutheran
- Previous denomination: Roman Catholic

History
- Status: Cathedral
- Dedication: John the Baptist; Blaise of Sebaste; The Virgin Mary; Nicholas of Myra
- Dedicated: 1247

Architecture
- Heritage designation: Cultural Heritage Monument of Schleswig-Holstein (201–202)
- Architectural type: Basilica
- Style: Romanesque; Gothic
- Groundbreaking: 1173
- Completed: 1335

Specifications
- Length: 131 m (429 ft 9 in)
- Height: 20 m (65 ft 7 in)
- Materials: Brick

UNESCO World Heritage Site
- Official name: Hanseatic City of Lübeck
- Type: Cultural
- Criteria: (iv)
- Designated: 1987
- Reference no.: 272
- Region: Western Europe

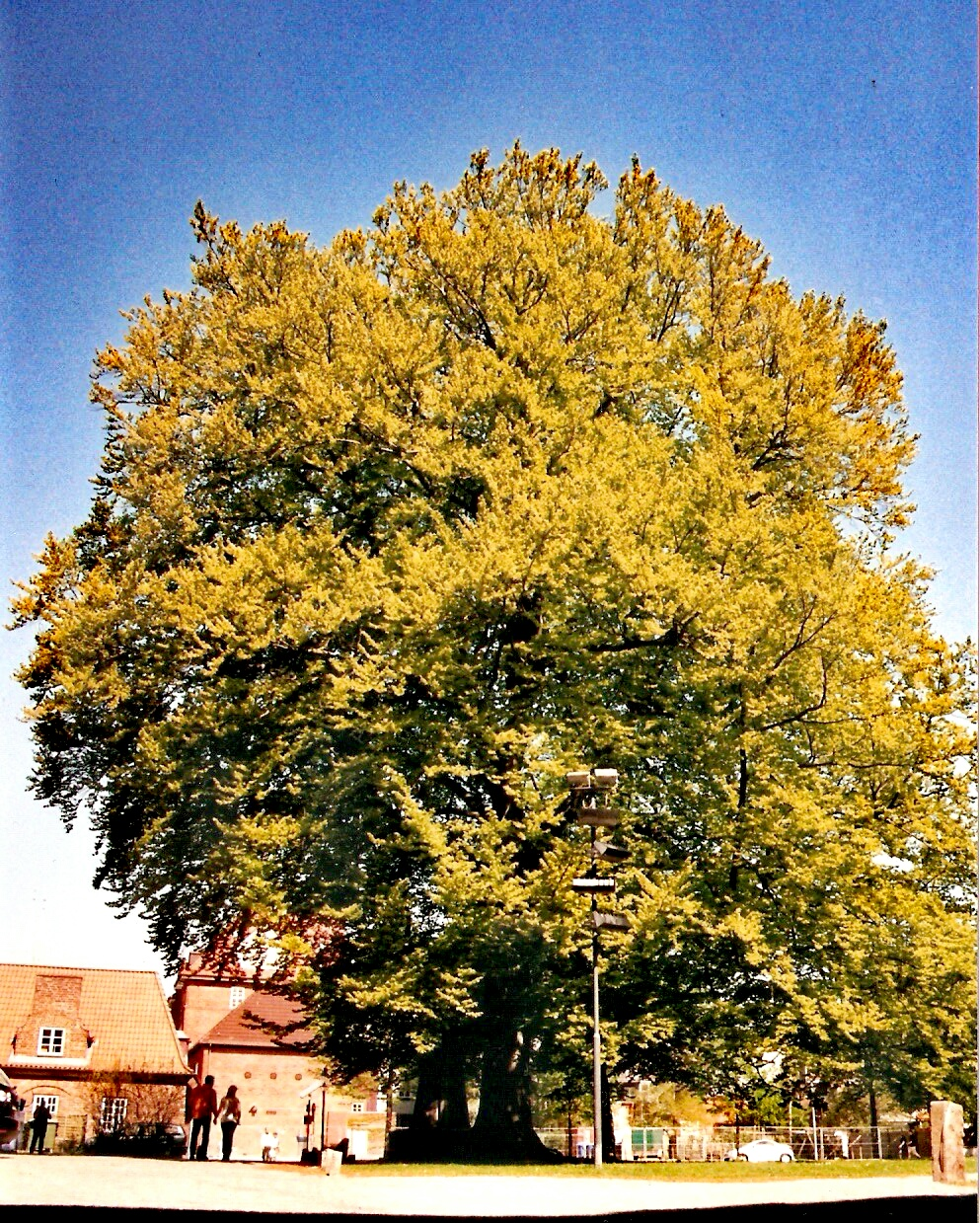
Lutheran beech in Lübeck

Lübeck Cathedral (German: Dom zu Lübeck, or colloquially Lübecker Dom) is a large brick-built Lutheran cathedral in Lübeck, Germany, and part of the Lübeck World Heritage Site. It was started in 1173 by Henry the Lion as a cathedral for the Bishop of Lübeck. It was partly destroyed in a bombing raid in World War II (1942), when the Arp Schnitger organ was destroyed by fire, but was subsequently reconstructed.

It is also famous for works of Bernt Notke and Thomas Quellinus, which survived the bombing raid in 1942. The famous altar by Hans Memling is now in Lübeck's St. Annen Museum. The current church was finished in 1982.

In 1873 the cathedral celebrated its 700th anniversary, when an offshoot of the Lutheran Memorial Beech Tree, in Steinbach near Bad Liebenstein in Thuringia, was planted in the churchyard.

== Construction ==
In 1173 Henry the Lion founded the cathedral to serve the Diocese of Lübeck, after the transfer in 1160 of the bishop's seat from Oldenburg in Holstein under bishop Gerold.

The then Romanesque cathedral was completed around 1230, but between 1266 and 1335 it was converted into a Gothic-style building with side-aisles raised to the same height as the main aisle (around 20m).

On the night of Palm Sunday (28–29 March) 1942 a Royal Air Force bombing raid destroyed a fifth of the town centre. Several bombs fell in the area around the church, causing the eastern vault of the quire to collapse and destroying the altar which dated from 1696. A fire from the neighbouring cathedral museum spread to the truss of the cathedral, and around noon on Palm Sunday the towers collapsed. An Arp Schnitger organ was lost in the flames. Nevertheless, a relatively large portion of the internal fittings was saved, including the cross and almost all of the medieval polyptychs. In 1946 a further collapse, of the gable of the north transept, destroyed the vestibule almost completely.

== Reconstruction ==
Reconstruction of the cathedral took several decades, as greater priority was given to the rebuilding of the Marienkirche. Work was completed only in 1982.

In 2002 a symposium took place in conjunction with the Lübeck Academy of Music to consider the reconstruction of the Arp Schnitger organ. It was concluded that such a reconstruction would be possible, but no decision has yet been taken. The discussion follows a research project at the university in Gothenburg, Sweden, where a reconstruction of the Lübeck organ has been going on since the mid-1990s. That reconstruction was concluded in 2001 with installation of the replica, including a replica of the organ front, in an earlier abandoned church from the late 1890s, Örgryte church. The church is now rebuilt as a concert hall.

The cathedral is unique in that at 105 m, it is shorter than the tallest church in the city. This is the consequence of a power struggle between the church and the guilds.

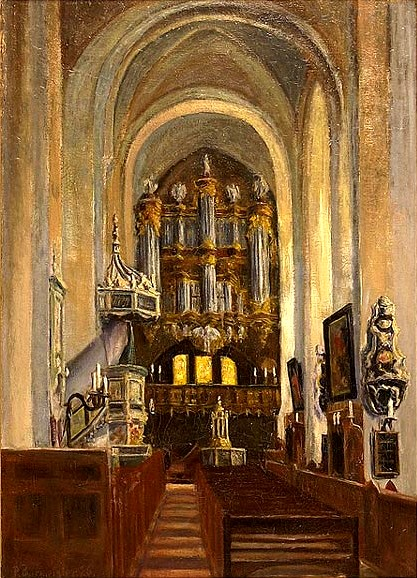
Interior before 1942.

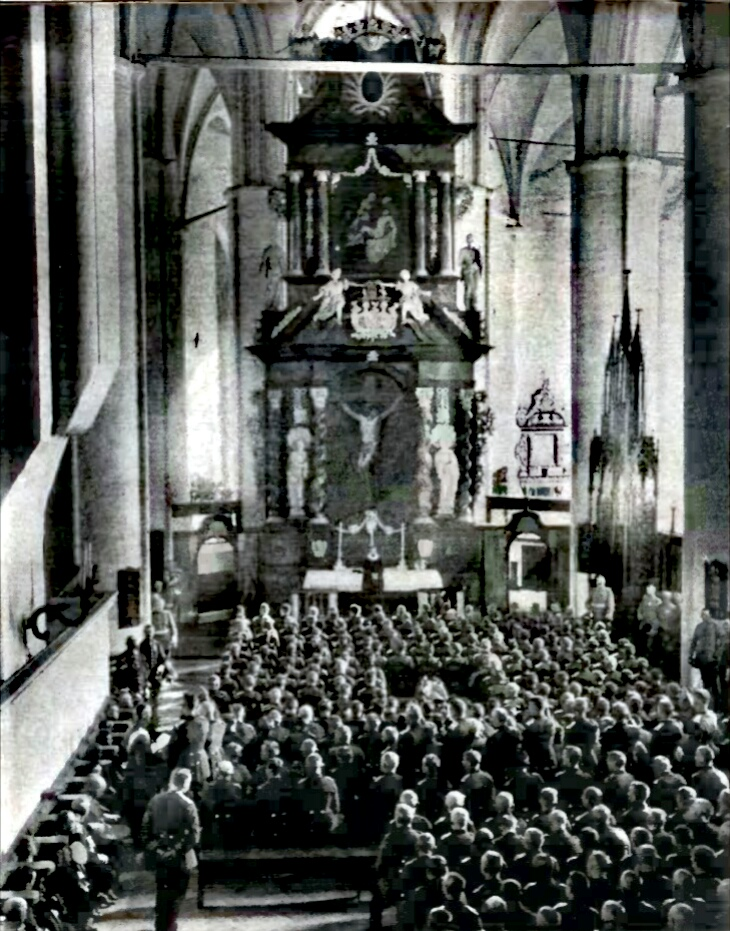
Interior, 23 November 1914.

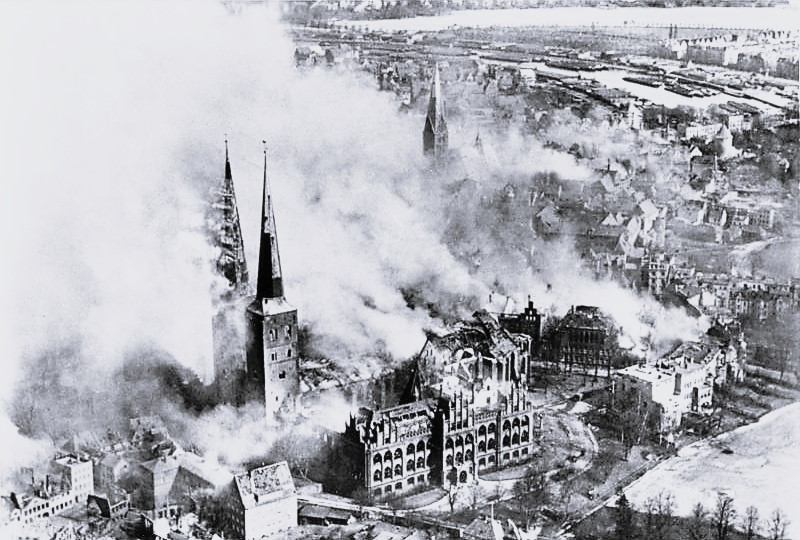
Burning Lübeck Cathedral after an air raid in 1942.

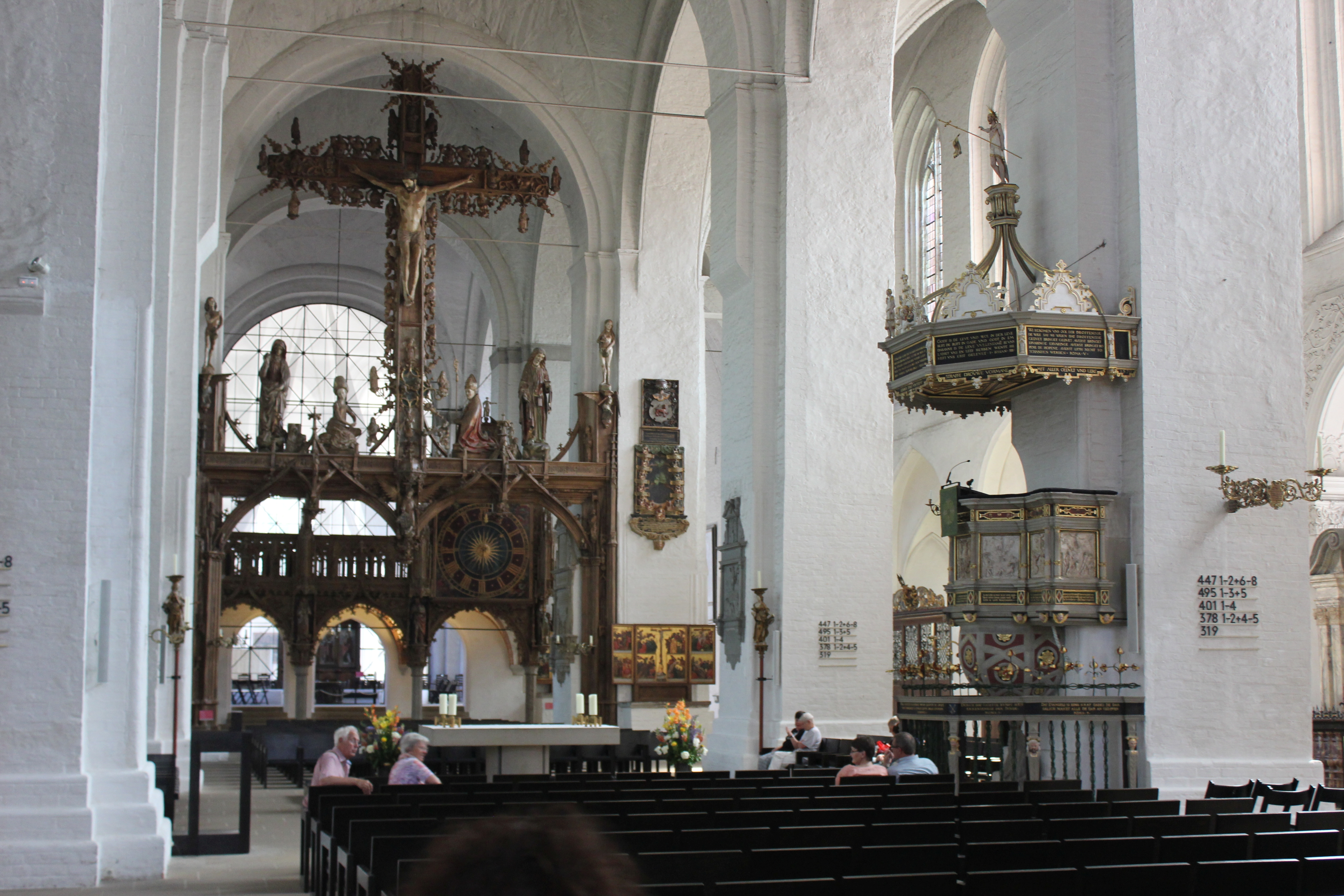
The nave post-restoration, in 2016.

== Fixtures ==
The 17 m crucifix is the work of the Lübeck artist Bernt Notke. It was commissioned by the bishop of Lübeck, Albert II Krummendiek, and erected in 1477. The carvings which decorate the rood screen are also by Notke.

Since the war, the famous altar of Hans Memling has been in the medieval collection of the St. Annen Museum, but notable polyptychs remain in the cathedral.

In the funeral chapels of the southern aisle are Baroque-era memorials by the Flemish sculptor Thomas Quellinus.

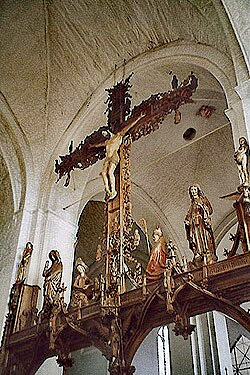
Crucifix of Bernt Notke

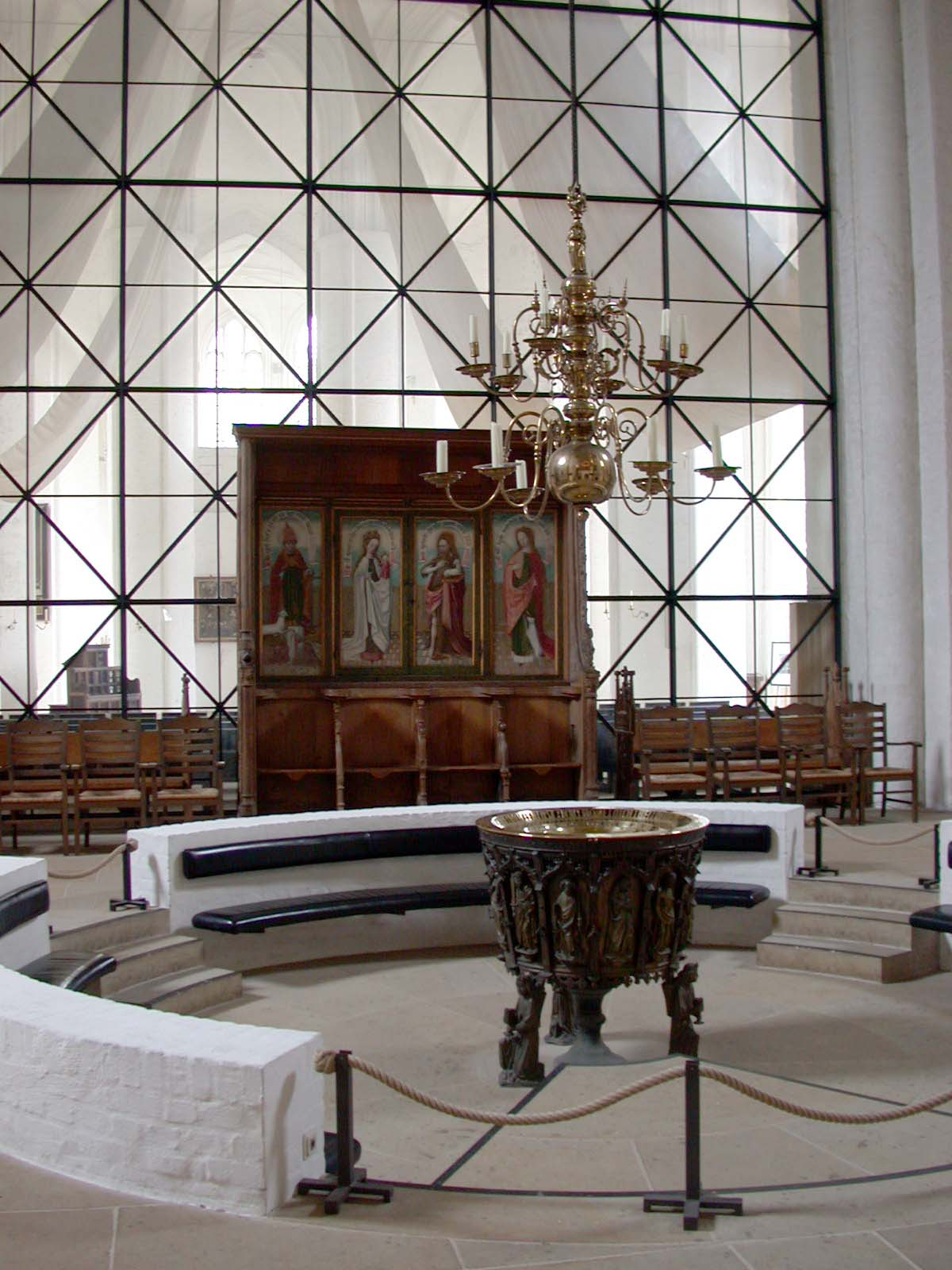
Baptismal font of Lorenz Grove

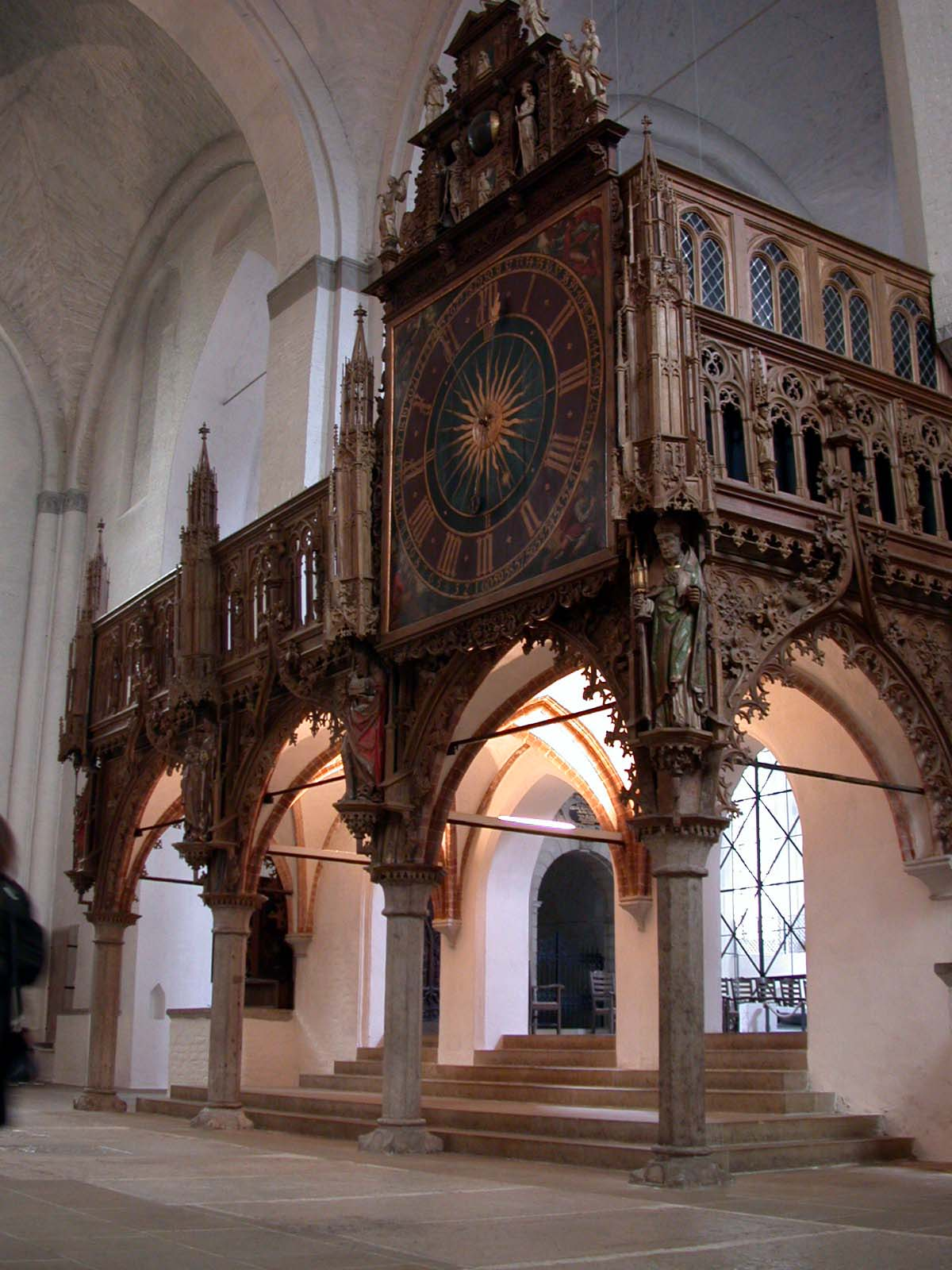
Rood screen

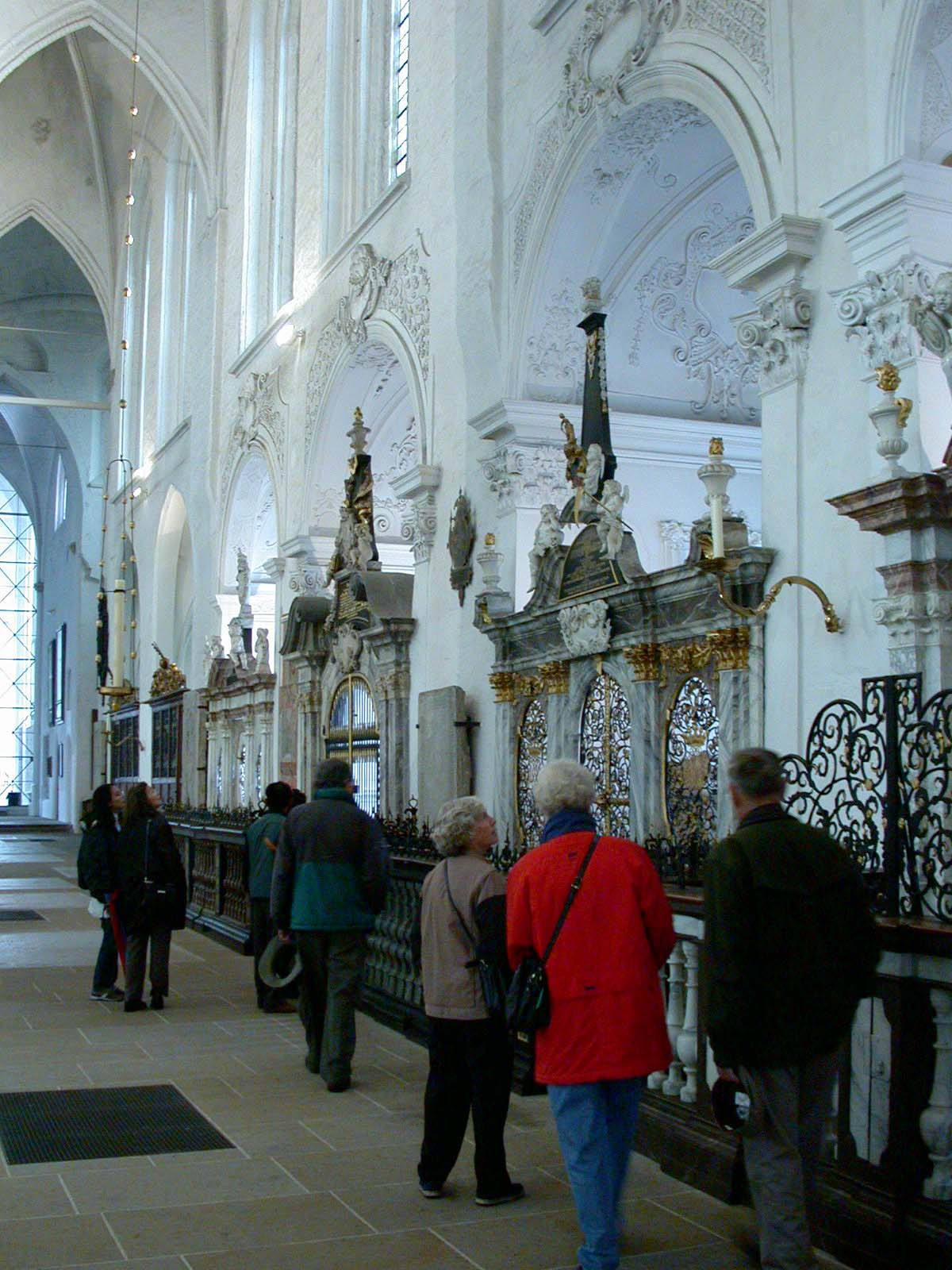
Funeral chapels

One of the most famous inscriptions inside the cathedral is a poem:

Ye call Me Master and obey me not,

Ye call Me Light and see Me not,

Ye call Me Way and walk not,

Ye call Me Life and desire Me not,

Ye call Me wise and follow Me not,

Ye call Me fair and love Me not,

Ye call Me rich and ask Me not,

Ye call Me eternal and seek Me not,

Ye call Me gracious and trust Me not,

Ye call Me noble and serve Me not,

Ye call Me mighty and honour Me not,

Ye call Me just and fear Me not,

If I condemn you, blame me not.

(Anonymous)

== Legend ==
According to legend, in the 8th century Charlemagne was hunting in Saxony and chased a huge deer. After a long pursuit he succeeded in capturing the animal but neither killed nor kept it. Instead he took a gold chain and laid it on the deer's antlers.

Four hundred years later the Wends and Saxons had converted to Christianity, and the man now out hunting was Henry the Lion, the founder of Lübeck. Henry had separated himself from his followers in order to be alone with his thoughts. He wanted to build a church, but lacked the necessary funds. At that moment a great deer appeared before him with a diamond-encrusted crucifix in its antlers. He took this as a sign from God, and shot the animal. He took the cross from its antlers; hardly had he done so when the deer rose up and disappeared into the bushes. The young duke now had enough money for the construction of the church.

== Cathedral and congregation today ==
The cathedral is now one of the three Lutheran churches of the North Elbian Evangelical Church. Since 2001 the bishop has been Bärbel Wartenberg-Potter.

The congregation is closely connected with the musical life of the city. Thanks to the long-serving organist and cantor Uwe Röhl (1925–2005), the cathedral plays host to the Schleswig-Holstein Musik Festival.
