= Evangelical Lutheran Church of Mecklenburg =

The Evangelical Lutheran Church of Mecklenburg (German: Evangelisch-Lutherische Landeskirche Mecklenburgs; abbreviated ELLM) was a Lutheran church in the German state of Mecklenburg-Vorpommern, serving the citizens living in Mecklenburg. The seat of the Landesbischof (state bishop) was the state capital Schwerin, with Schwerin Cathedral as the principal church. It is the most important Protestant denomination in this area.

In May 2012, the Evangelical Lutheran Church of Mecklenburg merged with the North Elbian Evangelical Lutheran Church and Pomeranian Evangelical Church into the Evangelical Lutheran Church in Northern Germany.

== History ==
The Lutheran church in Mecklenburg dates to the Reformation in the duchies of Mecklenburg, starting with single protagonists in 1523. In 1549, John Albert I, Duke of Mecklenburg gained a majority of deputies of the united Landtag of the separate duchies of Mecklenburg (Mecklenburg-Güstrow, -Schwerin and -Strelitz) to officially introduce the Lutheran confession as the state religion in the duchies. Afterwards the dukes of the branch duchies served as supreme governors of the separate Lutheran churches in the duchies, which later merged to two duchies, Schwerin and Strelitz.

When the grand dukes of Mecklenburg-Schwerin and Mecklenburg-Strelitz abdicated in 1918, the Lutheran state churches became independent. They adopted new church orders providing for an office called state bishop. In 1934, the regional churches merged into the Evangelical Lutheran State Church of Mecklenburg.

The ELLM was a full member of the Protestant Church in Germany, the United Evangelical Lutheran Church of Germany (VELKD), the Community of Protestant Churches in Europe, and the Lutheran World Federation. The church was based on the teachings brought forward by Martin Luther and others during the Reformation.

The ELLM merged with the Pomeranian Evangelical Church and the North Elbian Evangelical Lutheran Church to form the Evangelical Lutheran Church in Northern Germany in May 2012.
