= St. Catherine's Church, Hamburg =

Church building in Hamburg, Germany

St. Catherine's Church
- Hauptkirche St. Katharinen
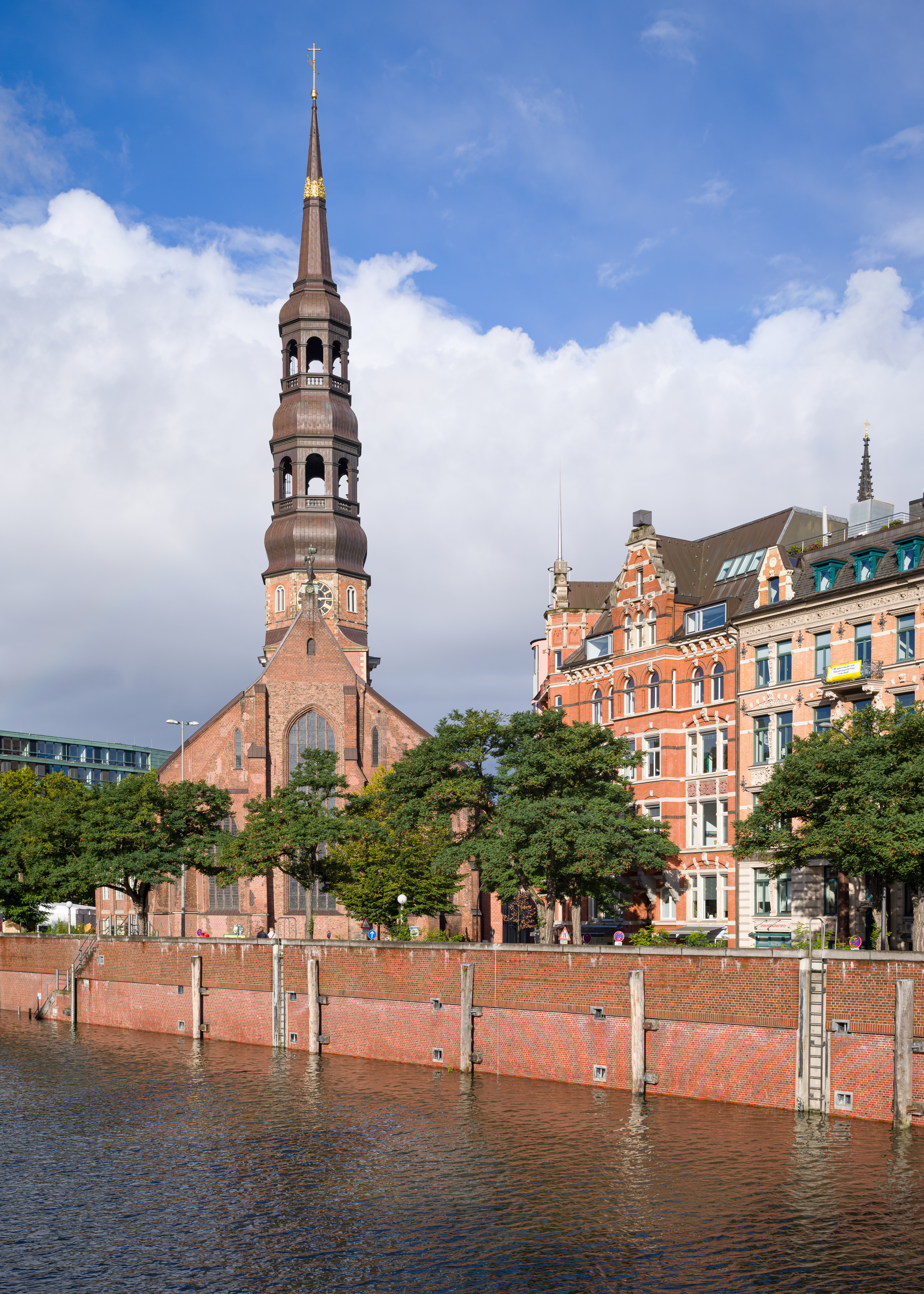
- St. Catherine’s Church in September 2022

- Location within Hamburg Location within Germany

Religion
- Affiliation: Protestant Church in Germany
- Ecclesiastical or organisational status: Cathedral

Location
- Location: Hamburg, Germany
- Coordinates: 53°32′45″N 9°59′39″E

Architecture
- Style: Brick Gothic
- Height (max): 115 m

St. Catherine's Church (German: St. Katharinen) is one of the five principal Lutheran churches (Hauptkirchen) of Hamburg, Germany. The base of its spire, dating from the 13th century, is the second oldest building preserved in the city, after the lighthouse on Neuwerk island. It is situated on an island near what was formerly the southern boundary of the medieval city, opposite the historic harbour area on the Elbe river. It traditionally served as the church of the seamen.

== History ==
The earliest attestation to the existence of the church dates back to 1256. The main body, consisting of a triple nave, was rebuilt during the mid-15th century in the north German Brick Gothic style. In 1657 a Baroque rooftop was added to the spire, which thus reached a height of 115 meters. The construction of the adjacent Speicherstadt and associated relocation of 20,000 people in the 1880s brought a substantial change to its parish. The church was mostly destroyed in an air-raid during World War II, on 30 July 1943, that left only the outer walls and the base of the spire standing. The building was restored between 1950 and 1957, and again between 2007 and 2012.

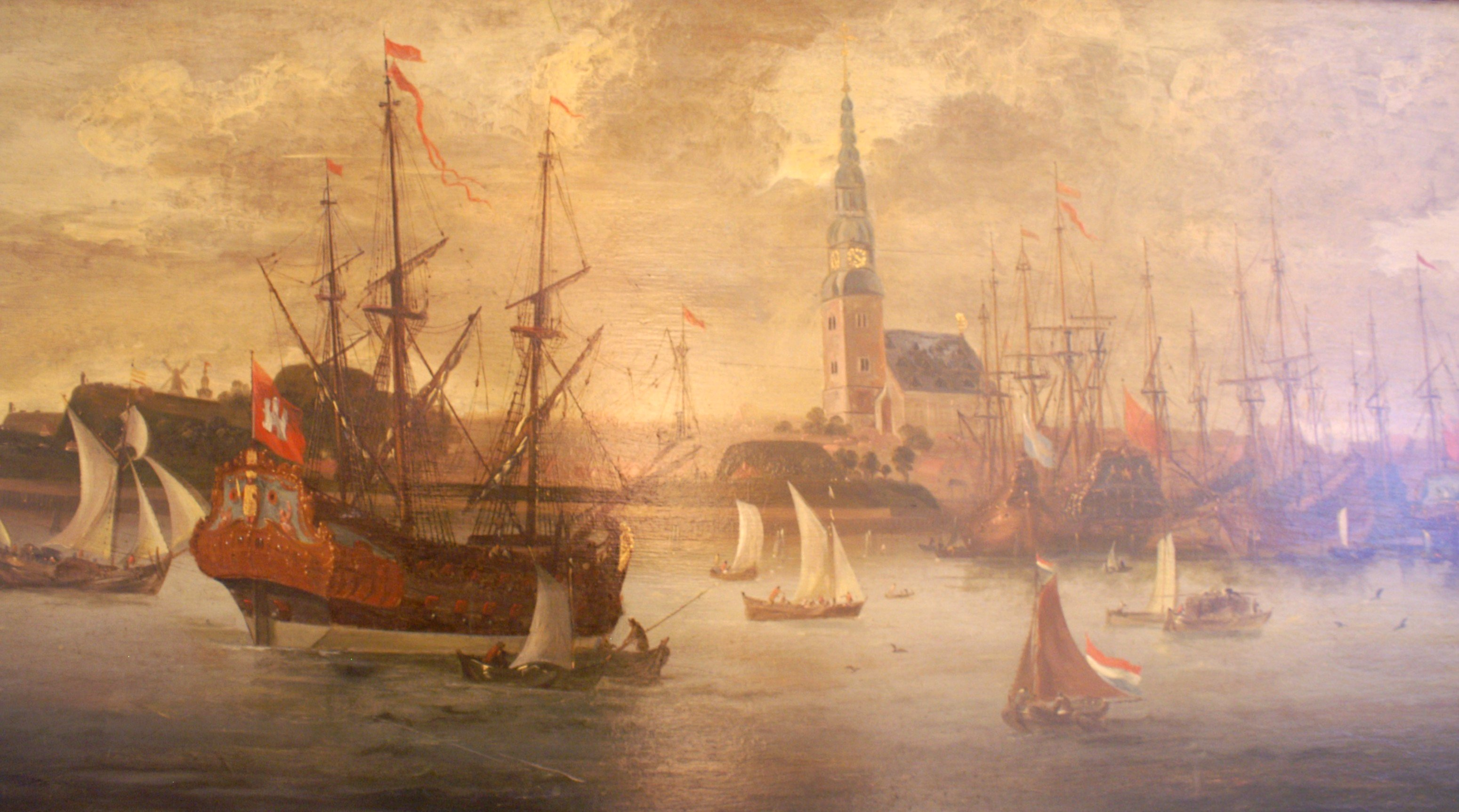
A 1688 painting by Johann Georg Stuhr depicts the ship Leopoldus Primus in Hamburg (from the southwest). St. Catherine's Church is visible in the background.

Famous pastors have included Joachim Westphal and Philipp Nicolai.

== Organ ==
St. Catherine's had an organ as early as the late 15th century, and by the 16th century it was considered the most important in Hamburg. This organ was replaced by a new organ built by Hans Stellwagen, rebuilt in 1670 and repaired by Johann Friederich Besser. In 1720, according to Johann Mattheson, this organ consisted of some 58 stops and approximately 88 ranks—disposed over 4 manuals and pedals—which may have made it the largest organ in the world at that time.

Among the organists who played here were Heinrich Scheidemann, Johann Adam Reinken (organist there for more than 40 years), and Johann Sebastian Bach. Bach first visited the church in the summer of 1701 and played here again in October/November 1720 when he auditioned for the post of organist at the nearby Jacobikirche; his Fantasy and Fugue in G minor, BWV 542 dates to this occasion. Bach greatly admired this organ, which featured two 32-foot ranks in the pedal, with four 16-foot ranks on the Hauptwerk (or Great) division and 16 diagonal shoe bellows to supply the wind to the instrument's windchests. Repairs were made in 1742, and a new lavishly carved decorated case was built; it was adorned with gilding and cherubs along with statues of angels playing trumpets.

The organ and its case were destroyed during bombing of Hamburg during the Second World War, though 520 pipes from 20 different stops were preserved. Together with photographs of the case and a pre-1943 description, these pipes form the starting point for a scientific reconstruction of the instrument. The restoration was conducted by the Flentrop firm. The project was titled "Eine Orgel für Bach" (An Organ for Bach), and was scheduled to be completed in June 2013. The Rückpositiv is already playable and was inaugurated on Easter Sunday 2009. The building of the three other manuals and the pedal towers started in September 2012. Two new registers will be added to the 58 described by Mattheson, bringing the total to 60.

The stops are as following:

Hauptwerk

Principal 16' Quintadena 16' Bordun 16' Octava 8' Querflöte 8' Spitzflöte 8' Octava 4' Octava 2' Rausch-Pfeiffe II Mixtura X Trommete 16' Trommete 8'

Rückpositiv

Principal 8' Gedact 8' Quintadena 8' Octava 4' Blockflöte 4' Hohlflöte 4' Quintflöte 1 1/2' Sifflet 1' Sesquialtera II Scharff VIII Regal 8' Oboe d'Amore 8' Schallmey 4'

Oberwerk

Principal 8' Hohlflöte 8' Viola di Gamba 8' Octava 4' Flöte 4' Nassat 3' Gemshorn 2' Waldflöte 2' Scharff VI Trommete 8' Zincke 8' Trommete 4'

Brustpositiv

Principal 8' Octava 4' Quintadena 4' Waldpfeife 2' Scharff VII Dulcian 16' Regal 8'

Pedal

Principal 32' Principal 16' Sub-Bass 16' Octava 8' Gedact 8' Octava 4' Nachthorn 4' Rauschpfeiffe II Mixtura V Cimbel III Groß-Posaune 32' Posaune 16' Dulcian 16' Trommete 8' Krumhorn 8´ Schalmey 4´ Cornet-Baß 2'

Speelhulpen

Schuifkoppel OW/HW Schuifkoppel BW/OW

2 Cymbelsterren Vogelgeschrei Timpani

Tremulant RW Tremulant BW Tremulant generaal

Recordings

Bach - Pièce d'Orgue BWV 572 - Leo van Doeselaar
Bach - Ich ruf zu dir, Herr Jesu Christ BWV 639 - Leo van Doeselaar
Bach - Fantasia Super: Komm, Heiliger Geist BWV 651 - Leo van Doeselaar
Bach - Fugue in B minor BWV 579 - Leo van Doeselaar
Bach - Concerto in D minor BWV 596
Bach - Sonata no. 1 in E-flat major BWV 525 - Wolfgang Zerer (German Wiki Page)
Bach - Wachet auf, ruft uns die Stimme BWV 645
Bach - O Lamm Gottes, unschuldig BWV 656
Bach - Wo soll ich fliehen hin BWV 646

== Burials ==
- Philipp Nicolai
- Johann Heinrich Scheidemann
- Johann Adam Reincken
