= Ministerial association =

Ecumenical Christian group

A ministerial association is an ecumenical Christian group that is active on the local level. Clergy from various congregations, including Anglican, Baptist, Catholic, Congregationalist, Lutheran, Methodist, Moravian, Orthodox, Presbyterian, and Reformed, often meet monthly to discuss local issues that they can collectively address, in addition to hosting events such as community Lenten services, or an interdenominational Good Friday service.

== United Methodist Church clusters ==
In the United Methodist Church there are church clusters which consist of three of more congregations.

== See also ==
- Local ecumenical partnership
