= Evangelical-Lutheran Church of Hanover =

- Evangelisch-lutherische Landeskirche Hannovers
- Type: Landeskirche, member of the Protestant Church in Germany
- Classification: Protestant
- Orientation: Lutheran
- Associations: • Protestant Church in Germany • United Evangelical Lutheran Church of Germany • Lutheran World Federation • Confederation of Protestant Churches in Lower Saxony
- Region: Lower Saxony
- Members: 2,096,179 (2025); 36.7% of total population
- Official website: www.landeskirche-hannovers.de

The Evangelical-Lutheran Church of Hanover (German: Evangelisch-lutherische Landeskirche Hannovers) is a Lutheran church body (Landeskirche) in the northern German state of Lower Saxony and the city of Bremerhaven covering the territory of the former Kingdom of Hanover.

The seat of the Landesbischof (bishop) is the Lower Saxon state capital Hanover. The Marktkirche is the preaching venue of the bishop.

Evangelical-Lutheran Church of Hanover

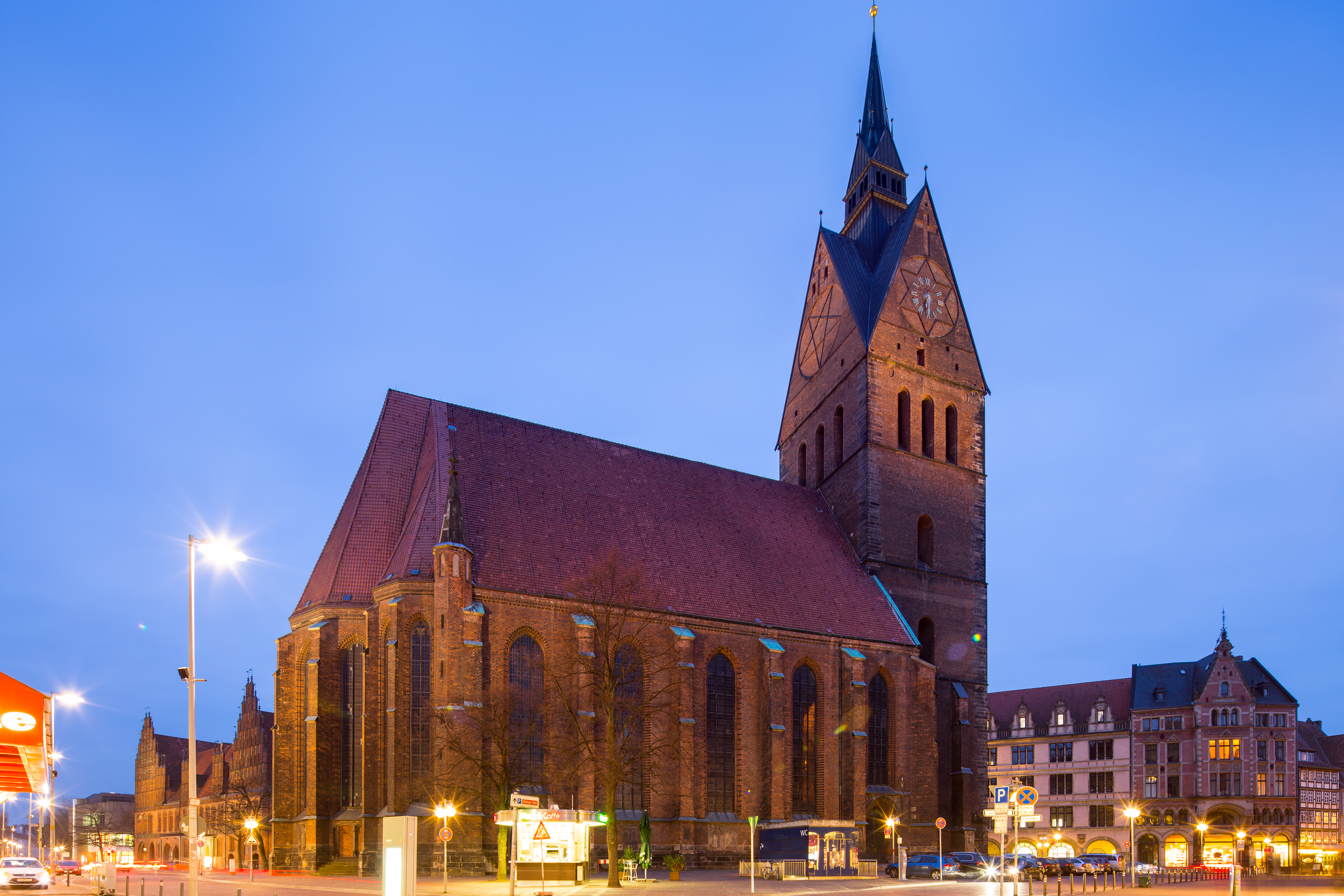
Markt Church, since 1925 bishop church

== Creeds and memberships ==
The teachings of the Church of Hanover are based on the teachings brought forward by Martin Luther during the Reformation. The Church of Hanover is a full member of the Protestant Church in Germany (EKD), the Confederation of Protestant Churches in Lower Saxony, the United Evangelical Lutheran Church of Germany (VELKD), the Community of Protestant Churches in Europe and the Lutheran World Federation.

== History ==
Before the formation of the Evangelical Lutheran State Church of Hanover in 1863/1864, there were several regional Protestant churches earlier established by and within the borders of previous principalities and regions, combined as the Kingdom of Hanover in 1814. These churches were:

- the General Diocese of Aurich (1815–1922, since 1863 a subdivision of the all-Hanoverian church), formed in East Frisia when annexed to Hanover,
- the General Diocese of Bremen-Verden (est. 1651, since 1863 a subdivision of the all-Hanoverian church), comprising the High-Bailiwick of Stade except for the Land of Hadeln,
- the Lutheran Church of the Land of Hadeln (1525–1885, since 1863 a subdivision of the Hanoverian church) based in Otterndorf,
- the old-Hanoverian Church (1705-merger of Calenberg [est. 1589] and Lunenburg-Celle [est. 1531] Lutheran state churches with subdivisions of its own), with its consistory based in Hanover city,
- the Loccum jurisdiction (Bezirk Loccum),
- the Osnabrück city jurisdiction (Bezirk Osnabrück-Stadt), and
- the Osnabrück land jurisdiction (Bezirk Osnabrück-Land).

All these churches were state churches in the Kingdom of Hanover, with the king being summus episcopus (Supreme Governor of the Lutheran churches), but otherwise without any joint bodies. In 1848 the Lutheran parishes were democratised by the introduction of presbyteries (German: Kirchenvorstand/Kirchenvorstände, sg./pl.; lit. in English: church board), elected by all major male parishioners and chairing each congregation in co-operation with the pastor, prior being the sole chairman. This introduction of presbyteries was somewhat revolutionary in the rather hierarchically structured Lutheran churches.

Whereas liberal Lutherans demanded the establishment of elected synods (general or regional church assemblies) too, feeling encouraged by the general development of parliamentarianism, the revivalist Lutherans strove for self-rule within the Lutheran churches in order to strengthen religion and faith against the government's interference in ecclesiastical affairs, considered by them as too rationalistic and too much inspired by ideas of the enlightenment. So liberal and revivalist Lutherans aimed at forming an ecclesiastical body, as provided by the 1833 constitution of Hanover, consisting of elected and appointed clergy and laymen.

Especially the catechism used since 1790 was unwelcome among revivalists as being too much inspired by ideas of the Enlightenment. So the Royal government, more precisely its ministry of cult and education, prepared a catechism reform to be prepared by government-appointed experts. The outcome was a new catechism, based on that of 1634, and on 14 April 1862 decreed by the government. If the outcome would have been less controversial the royal administration might have had the opportunity to continue its church policy the monarchic supreme-governor way. However, the new old-style catechism, including regular confession, desired by King George V, but meanwhile widely out of use and considered among many liberal Lutherans as too Catholic and un-Protestant, caused an outrage, the Hanover Catechism Strife, surprising the Royal administration.

Inspired by the protest note "Prüfet Alles" (about English: put all on trial!) by Pastor Karl Gustav Wilhelm Baurschmidt, later nicknamed the Luther of the Wendland, a movement evolved. When summoned by the Hanover Consistory in order to explain himself, a crowd of thousand accompanied him through the streets of that city and military was sent suppressing any gathering and subsequent street riots in town.

George V gave in, he dismissed his minister of cult, finally even his complete cabinet and, under the tensions occurring, he withdrew the reformed catechism. George V agreed to get the catechism reform revised by an ecclesiastical body formed according to the 1833 constitution. In autumn 1862 the new minister of cult, Carl Lichtenberg (term: 1862–1865), convened this body, called the Vorsynode (i.e. proto-synod, a preliminary church legislative assembly), comprising 72 members, 64 elected, eight appointed, half of them clergy, the others laymen. The proto-synod met and negotiated several times until 6 October 1863, becoming the founding body of the Evangelical Lutheran State Church of Hanover, uniting synodals from all the seven existing old Lutheran state churches in the kingdom.

Its then 72 male members were to design a church constitution, including the regulations as to the synod. The formation of the Church of Hanover was thus started by defining all the then existing Lutheran congregations in the kingdom as part of the to-be-represented church electorate. In October 1864 the Estates Assembly of Hanover (the parliament Ständeversammlung) adopted the first law, outlined by the proto-synod, as to the constitution of the all-Hanoverian Lutheran state church, its component subdivisions (dioceses and jurisdictions), and its legislative state synod (German: Landessynode; historically state synod is the correct translation, as to the post-1918 function, without state churches anymore, regional synod is more appropriate).

After the Prussian conquest in 1866, on 19 September 1866, the day before the official Prussian annexation took place and with the last king, George V, already in exile, the Kingdom's six government-appointed consistories established the joint all-Hanoveran state consistory (Landeskonsistorium), based in Hanover too, consisting of representatives from each provincial consistory. The provincial consistories were in Aurich, a simultaneously Lutheran and Reformed consistory dominated by Lutherans (for East Frisia) and the Lutheran consistories in Hanover (for the former Electorate of Brunswick and Lunenburg proper), in Ilfeld (for the County of Hohenstein, a Hanoverian exclave in the Eastern Harz mountains), in Osnabrück (for the former Prince-Bishopric of Osnabrück), in Otterndorf (existed 1535-1885 for the Land of Hadeln) as well as in Stade (existed 1650-1903, until 1885 for the former Bremen-Verden proper without Hadeln, then including the complete Stade Region). Thus with the Church of Hanover the elected state synod came first and the formation of a steady nationwide executive, the Landeskonsistorium (state consistory) followed as the second step in 1866.

The first ordinary state synod (Landessynode), succeeding the proto-synod, only convened in 1869, when after the Prussian annexation the Hanoverian Lutherans desired a representative body separate from Prussian rule, though it was restricted to Lutheran matters only. The Church of Hanover became a stronghold of Hanoverian separatism and therefore somewhat politicised. It opposed the Prussian Union, comprising the Protestant parishes in the Prussian territory prior the 1866 annexations, not only for its being a stronghold of Prussian patriotism, but for being a united church of Lutheran and Calvinist congregations, with a preponderance of Calvinism because the Calvinist Hohenzollern dynasty wielded its influence in the unification of Lutherans and Calvinists in then Prussia in 1817.

The Hanoverian Lutherans managed to maintain their independence, with the Prussian government refraining from imposing the Prussian Union onto them. The reconciliation of the Lutheran majority of the citizens in annexed Hanover with their new Prussian citizenship was not to be further complicated by religious quarrels. Until 1903 all provincial consistories except for the one in Aurich were dissolved, their functions taken over by the state consistory.

The Weimar Constitution of 1919 provided for the separation of state and religion. After the system of state churches had disappeared with the monarchies in the German states, the question arose why the Protestant church bodies within Germany did not merge. Besides the smaller Protestant denominations of the Mennonites, Baptists or Methodists, which were organised across state borders along denominational lines, in 1922 there were 29 (later 28) church bodies organised along territorial borders of the German states or Prussian provinces.

In fact, a merger was permanently under discussion, but never materialised due to strong regional self-confidence and traditions as well as the denominational fragmentation into Lutheran, Calvinist (Reformed) and United and uniting churches. Following the Swiss example of 1920, the Evangelical Lutheran State Church of Hanover and 28 other territorially defined German Protestant churches founded the German Evangelical Church Confederation in 1922, which was no new merged church, but a loose federation of the existing independent church bodies. In 1922 the Church of Hanover counted 2,414,000 parishioners.

Since the adoption of the Leuenberg Agreement in 1973 the Church of Hanover practises church fellowship with many non-Lutheran Protestant churches in Germany and the world, understood as pulpit and table fellowship as well as full communion in witness and service.

After Margot Käßmann's resignation as bishop in February 2010, Hans-Hermann Jantzen served as vicar (acting bishop) until Ralf Meister's investiture as her successor on 26 March 2011.

== Practices ==
Ordination of women and blessing of same-sex marriages were allowed.

== Today's subdivisions ==
The Church of Hanover is divided into 6 dioceses of land districts (German: Sprengel) in which a regional bishop presides:

- district of Hanover (Sprengel Hannover) - regional bishop: Petra Bahr
  - with the City Church Association Hanover (Stadtkirchenverband Hannover): (city superintendent (German: Stadtsuperintendent): Hans-Martin Heinemann)
- district of Hildesheim-Göttingen (Sprengel Hildesheim-Göttingen) - regional bishop:Eckhard Gorka
- district of Lüneburg (Sprengel Lüneburg) - regional bishop: Dieter Rathing
- district of Osnabrück (Sprengel Osnabrück) - regional bishop: Burkhard Krause
- district of East Frisia/Emsland (Sprengel Ostfriesland) - regional bishop: Detlef Klahr
- district of Stade (Sprengel Stade)- regional bishop: Hans Christian Brandy

Each district is in turn divided into smaller deaneries (Kirchenkreis), each of which is led by a superintendent. The 56 deaneries are divided into 1320 parishes.

== Bodies ==
The Evangelical-Lutheran Church of Hanover has six constitutional bodies, these are the Bishop, the Church Senate, the Synode, the Territorial Synodal Committee, the Church Office and the Council of Bishops.

=== Synod ===
The Synode (Landessynode, i.e. historically state synod is the correct translation, as to the post-1918 situation, without state churches anymore, regional synod is the more appropriate translation) is the parliament of the Church. Since 1869 the Landessynode was elected for three year terms, with the interruption - due to the Struggle of the Churches between 1934 and 1946.

Today the members of the Synod, the synodals, are elected every six years in constituencies. Today's Landessynode comprises 75 synodals, 63 elected, ten appointed by the church senate, one delegated by the Lutheran theological faculty of the George Augustus University in Göttingen and the Abbot of Loccum, as an ex officio member.

The Synod meets twice a year. Its duties are similar to those of political parliaments. The Landessynodalausschuss (synodal committee) is the elected steady board representing the synod between synodal meetings. President of the Synod is Matthias Kannengiesser.

=== Bishop ===
Since its new constitution of 1925, accounting for the separation of religion and state by the Weimar Constitution (1919), the Head of the Church of Hanover is the bishop (Landesbischof) who is elected by the Synod. The bishop usually retires at the age of 65. Until 1918 there was supreme governorship (summepiscopacy) by the respective monarch, whereas the actual executive of the church (Landeskonsistorium) was led by its presidents, competent to sign contracts of the church.

The bishop also has his or her headquarters in Hanover, the Marktkirche there is the bishop's preaching venue. The Bishop is chairman of the College in the church office (see below).

Bishops

- 1925–1947: August Marahrens
- 1947–1971: Johannes Lilje
- 1971–1988: Eduard Lohse
- 1988–1999: Horst Hirschler
- 1999–2010: Margot Käßmann
- 2010–2011: vacancy, Hans-Hermann Jantzen acting per pro as vicar
- since 26 March 2011: Ralf Meister

==== Presidents of the State Consistory ====
- 1866–1883: Carl Lichtenberg, last Hanoverian Kultusminister (minister of culture)
- 1883–1885: vacancy
- 1885–1893: Otto Mejer
- 1894–1903: Bodo Voigts
- 1903–1910: Heinrich Franz Chalybäus
- 1911: Wilhelm Heinichen
- 1912–1920: Hermann Steinmetz
- 1921–1924: Ernst Lohmann

=== Bischofsrat (council of Bishops) ===
On all matters concerning ecclesiastical life, the Bischofsrat consults at regular meetings. It consists of the Landesbischof (bishop) of the Church of Hannover and the regional bishop, the spiritual heads of today's six dioceses (Sprengel). The Bischofsrat is in charge of recommending agendas, hymn books and catechisms.

=== Church Senate ===
Another important body is the Church Senate (Kirchensenat). It is the steady directing collegial body combining the bishop, the president of the church office, the president of the synod, the president of the synodal committee, one clerical member of the Church Office, one of the six regional bishops, three synodals, and four other members of the Church of Hanover (but not synodals).

The Church Senate prepares bills and may issue ordinances within the scope of church laws passed by the synod. The church senate proposes up to three candidates for the bishop elections, it appoints the regional bishops and supervises them, it appoints ten members of the synod, it appoints the presidents and vice-presidents of the church office, chooses the Church of Hanover delegates for the Protestant Church in Germany meetings, it demarks the competences of the bishop, the regional bishops, and the church office.

=== Church Office ===
The Regional Church Office (German: Landeskirchenamt Hannover) is the administrative center of the Church of Hanover. The Bishop is chairman of the College in the church office (or less the "government" of the Church), which includes, besides the bishop, the president of the Church Office, the Spiritual Vice President (since 2006: Arend de Vries), the Legal Vice President ( since 2002: Rolf Krämer)) and the theological and legal supreme regional church councillors (German: Oberlandeskirchenräte). There are currently (2008) 210 employees working in the Church Office.

==== Presidents ====
- 1924–1929: Viktor Lampe
- 1930–1933: Max Schramm
- 1933–1946: Friedrich Schnelle
- 1946–1952: Gustav Ahlhorn
- 1952–1970: Karl Wagenmann
- 1970–1983: Johann Frank
- 1984–2008: Eckhart von Vietinghoff
- 2008- 2013: Burkhard Guntau
- since 2013: Stephanie Springer

==== Spiritual Vice Presidents ====
- 1924–1932: Karl Wagenmann
- 1932–1933: Paul Fleisch
- 1933–1934: Gerhard Hahn
- 1953–1965: Christhard Mahrenholz
- 1965–1969: Friedrich Bartels
- 1969–1984: Hans Philipp Meyer
- 1984–1999: Günter Linnenbrink
- 1999–2001: Hans Schmidt
- 2001–2002: Ernst Kampermann
- 2002–2006: Martin Schindehütte
- since 2006: Arend de Vries

== Mission ==
The Evangelical-Lutheran Mission in Lower Saxony (ELM), which was founded in 1977 as a common organisation for the Churches of Hanover, of Brunswick and of Schaumburg-Lippe, maintains relationships with the overseas partner churches of the Hanoverian regional church. Its history dates back to 1849 when Pastor Ludwig Harms began training the first missionaries. The headquarters of the ELM is in Hermannsburg in the Südheide.

== Haus kirchlicher Dienste ( House of Church Services) ==
The Haus kirchlicher Dienste (since 2002) (House of Church Services), founded in September 1937 as Amt für Gemeindedienst (Office for congregational services) are the service and competence center for the Church of Hanover and supports the work of the Church of Hannover and the parishes. The house provides facilities and agencies for work areas in the Church of Hanover. In 2011, the House of Church Services had 200 employees. The House of Church Services also includes the Hanns-Lilje-House (Hanns-Lilje-Haus) and the Bursfelde Abbey.

The departments are:

- Department 1 includes the areas of library work, the deacons (German: Diakone), volunteers, deans' secretaries, community consultation and organisational development, community management, sexton, media (Media Centre of the Church of Hanover), and parish secretaries.
- Department 2 oversees the Bursfelde Abbey, faith and Bible classes, home groups, church tourism, church for vacationers, spa and leisure ministry, missionary service, the missionary center Hanstedt I, open churches and pilgrimage and meditation paths.
- Department 3 comprises the work with older people, visiting services, women's work, men's work, sports, and the World Day of Prayer.
- Department 4 is the youth ministry.
- Department 5 includes the areas of ecumenism, church in Europe, the relationships with Islam and Judaism, migrants, the topic of ethnic and Eastern Churches, and the assistance for Chernobyl children, philosophical issues, art and culture, the Decade to Overcome Violence development-related education, peace building and support of community service and volunteer services.
- Department 6 includes the areas of work, business and social affairs, church service for trade and commerce, rural areas and agriculture, and ecology and environmental management.

in cooperation with the Confederation of Protestant churches in Lower Saxony:

- Church service in police and customs
- Evangelical adult education in Lower Saxony (Evangelische Erwachsenenbildung Niedersachsen)
- The Protestant village assistants' work (Evangelisches Dorfhelferinnenwerk Niedersachsen)

religious associations:

- The Evangelical Association of Family Education Center Hanover
- Central Association meeting Christians and Jews e.V.
- Evangelical Partners Help e.V.

Church Office Hanover:

- Audit Office
- Staff Office
- Fund of the Church

In addition, sections of the Evangelical Media Service Centre

=== Director ===
- (1937) 1941-1953: Oberkirchenrat Adolf Cillien
- 1953-1956: Landessuperintendent Theodor Laasch (per pro)
- 1956-1961: Former Superintendent Paul Kurth
- 1965-1975: Former Superintendent Rudolph Herrfahrdt
- 1975-1990: Professor Paul Gerhard Jahn
- 1990-1999: Pastor Hans Joachim Schliep
- 1999-2008: Pastor Dine Fecht
- Since 2008: Pastor Ralf Tyra

The Director is the Chairman of the Executive Committee (Former: Leadership Conference), which, in addition to the directors, the CEO, the head of the department and the pedagogical head of Protestant adult education in Lower Saxony (Ev. Erwachsenenbildung Niedersachsen) be a member of. From 1979 to 2002, the director of the Office of Congregational Service (now: House of Church Services) was the Commissioner for the Environment of the Confederation of Protestant Churches in Lower Saxony.

== Institutions of the Church ==
In Loccum, the church maintains a Protestant academy and a theological seminary, which is located in the Loccum Abbey. Other facilities are the Religion Pedagogical Institute, the Center for Health Ethics (German: Zentrum für Gesundheitsethik) and the Hanns-Lilje Foundation (Hanns-Lilje-Stiftung).
