= Evangelical-Lutheran Church in Württemberg =

Protestant church of Württemberg, Germany

Evangelical-Lutheran Church in Württemberg

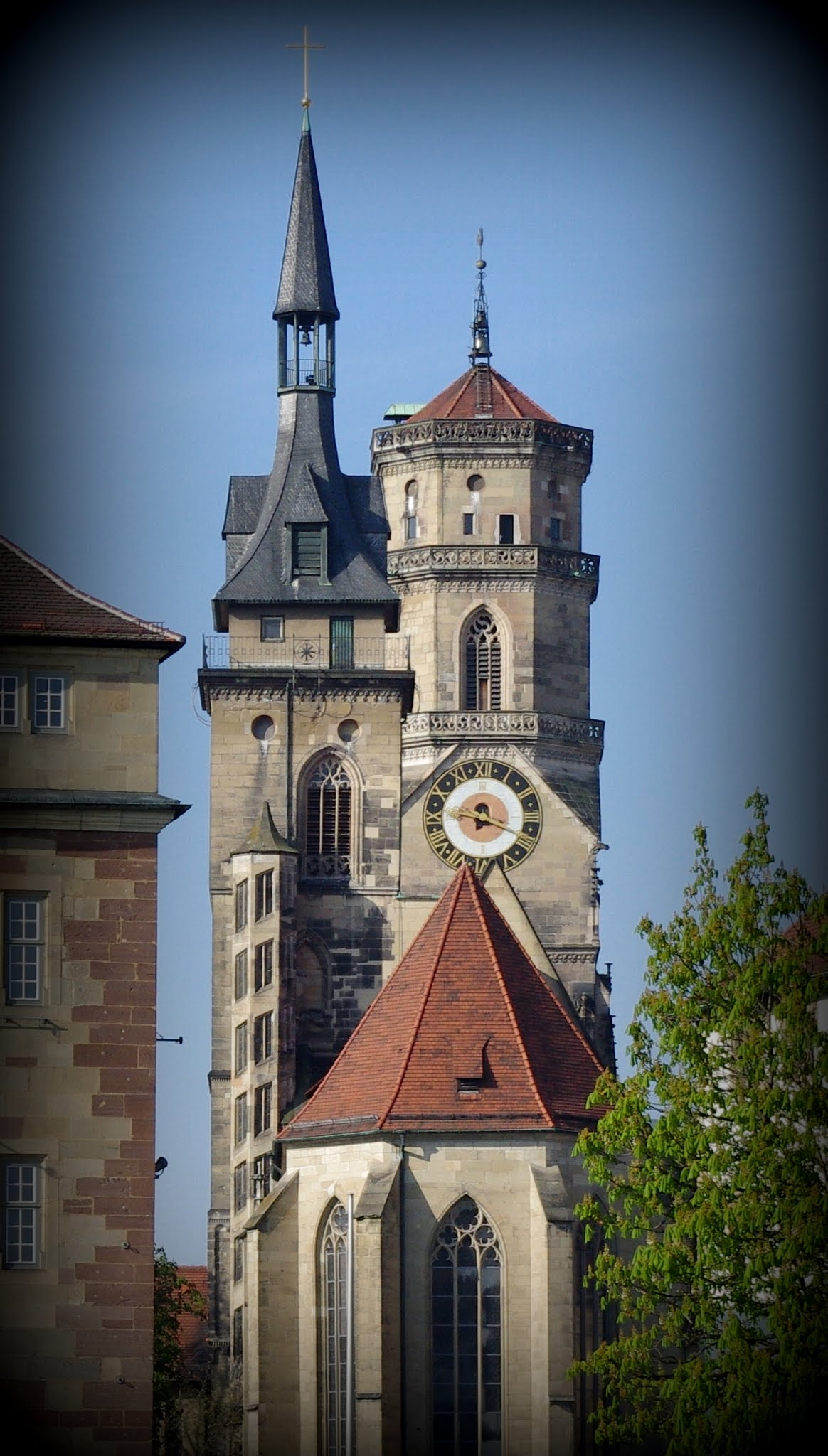
Stift Church in Stuttgart

The Evangelical-Lutheran Church in Württemberg (German: Evangelische Landeskirche in Württemberg) is a Lutheran member church of the Protestant Church in Germany in the former German state of Württemberg, now part of the state of Baden-Württemberg.

The seat of the church is in Stuttgart. It is a full member of the Protestant Church in Germany (EKD), and is a Lutheran Church. In 2025, the presiding bishop (Landesbischof) of the church is Ernst-Wilhelm Gohl; he succeeded bishop Frank Otfried July in 2022. There are four regional bishops (Regionalbischöfe). The regional bishops are located at Heilbronn, Stuttgart, Ulm, and Reutlingen.

The Evangelical-Lutheran Church of Württemberg is one of 20 Lutheran, united and reformed churches of the EKD. In 2020, the church had 1,914,425 members in about 1,300 parishes; by 2025, this was down to 1,673,041. It is the most important Protestant denomination in eastern Baden-Württemberg. The Lutheran Church of Württemberg is a member church of the Community of Protestant Churches in Europe. It is a member of the Lutheran World Federation and a guest member of the United Evangelical Lutheran Church of Germany. The Church runs a minister training house in Tübingen called Tübinger Stift. Its most prominent churches are the Stiftskirche in Stuttgart, the Minster in Ulm, St Kilian's church in Heilbronn, St. Mary's Church, Reutlingen, the city church St. Dionysius in Esslingen, and St. Michael's church in Schwäbisch Hall. The ordination of women, like in all other EKD churches, has been allowed. In March 2019, the Church allowed blessing of same-sex unions.

== History ==
In 1534, Ulrich, Duke of Württemberg enforced the Protestant Reformation in his Duchy of Württemberg. The Duke, who later became the King of Württemberg, was the head of the state church as the summus episcopus, meaning the ruler united secular and religious power in his person. The former Catholic bishops lost all privileges. Johannes Brenz was empowered to reform the state church following the teachings of Martin Luther. He is entombed in the Stuttgart Stiftskirche.

The state church in Württemberg was from the beginning a Lutheran church. However, the form of the church service followed the Reformed tradition, meaning that it is rather plain. The form of the Lutheran church service is hardly ever practised. It is however practised in Hohenzollern. Huguenot, Hussite and Waldensian immigrants had found refuge in the duchy. The Bible Institute was established in Urach by the lord of Sonneck, Hans von Ungnad. He also printed 30,000 Bibles and smuggled them over the borders guarded by local hunters.

Up to 1806 the Duchy of Württemberg was a purely Protestant territory. Only after Württemberg became a kingdom and, due to Napoleon, larger Catholic territories (Upper Swabia) were added did the uniform religious structure end. Protestant parishes have also been established in the former Catholic territories of (southern) Württemberg since the late 19th century.

After the end of World War I, all titles of nobility were abolished in newly republican Germany and so William II of Württemberg was forced to abdicate. The church therefore formally had no leader. When William died in October 1921, his successor as head of the former royal house was Albrecht, Duke of Württemberg, but as a Catholic the Lutheran state church could not accept him as summus episcopus. As a result, the state church in Württemberg enacted a new constitution in 1923/24 and installed a church president as the leader of the church; in 1933 the leader was given the title Landesbischof. During World War II, the YMCA was involved in supporting millions of POWs. "One of the most important tasks of the Y.M.C.A. delegates was, if time permitted, to sit down and talk to the internees about their personal problems and, thereafter, try to establish the contacts with families and friends in the outside world and to secure the items wished for." "Wartime Logs", William Hilsley, Tagebuch eines internierten Musikers.

In 1945, the Protestant deanery (Kirchenkreis) of the Evangelical Church of the old-Prussian Union in the Province of Hohenzollern adopted provisional supervision by the Evangelical State Church in Württemberg. On April 1, 1950, the deanery joined the latter church body and terminated its supervision by the prior old-Prussian Ecclesiastical Province of the Rhineland.

The state church in Württemberg hosted the 11th General Assembly of the Lutheran World Federation in Stuttgart, Germany, on 20–27 July 2010.

== Leaders and bishops ==
- 1924–1929: Johannes von Merz, church president
- 1929–1948: Theophil Wurm, bishop (until 1933 church president)
- 1948–1962: Dr. Martin Haug, bishop
- 1962–1969: Dr. Erich Eichele, bishop
- 1969–1979: Helmut Claß, bishop
- 1979–1988: Hans von Keler, bishop
- 1988–1994: Theo Sorg, bishop
- 1994–2001: Eberhardt Renz, bishop
- 2001–2005: Gerhard Maier, bishop
- 2005 –2022: Frank Otfried July, bishop
- since 2022: Ernst-Wilhelm Gohl, bishop

== Synod ==
The election of the synod is for six years.

== Youth ==
Child and Youth work is running on the YMCA (CVJM-Gesamtverband). The local state office (Landesstelle) is a free democratic organisation "Evangelisches Jugendwerk in Württemberg "working in order of the Lutheran Church in Württemberg. Trumpet choir (Posaunenchor) groups without age limit may take part in the "Evangelisches Jugendwerk in Württemberg ". The biennial Trombone Choir Day (Landesposaunentag) takes place in Ulm.

The Überbündische meeting (in short "ÜT") took place in 1977 and 2017 in the Böttingen (Heuberg) courtyard of the Protestant church youth. A total of 3,400 people took part in over 45 different societies and institutions of scouts and the youth movement. A total of 70.000 people attended the European young adults meeting in Stuttgart in 1996. The Parish Youth is working stably on a largely self-organising basis in order of the Lutheran Church in Württemberg, in Tailfingen by the elected youth church council.

== Parishioners ==
- 1922: 1,668,000 members
- 2007: 2,286,893 members
- 2025: 1,673,041 members

== See also ==
- Wachet auf, ruft uns die Stimme

== Sources ==
- Breyer, Mirko (1952). O starim i rijetkim jugoslavenskim knjigama: bibliografsko-bibliofilski prikaz. Izdavački zavod Jugoslavenske akademije znanosti i umjetnosti.
- Society (1990). Slovene Studies: Journal of the Society for Slovene Studies. The Society.
