= Ralf Tyra =

German Lutheran theologian and pastor (born 1958)

Ralf Tyra (born 1958, in Osnabrück) is a German Lutheran theologian and pastor. Since September 2008 he is the Director of the House of church Offices of the Evangelical-Lutheran Church of Hanover.

== Career ==
Ralf Tyra studied theology in Münster and Tübingen. After serving as vicar in Osnabrück, he became a research associate at the School of Theology in Berlin. From 1989 to 1996 was Ralf Tyra pastor at the St. Paul Church in Wolfsburg. In 1996, Tyra was appointed Secretary and CEO of the Hanns-Lilje Foundation (Hanns-Lilje-Stiftung (in German)). In 2008 Pastor Ralf Tyra was director of the House of church Offices. He is member of the convent of the Loccum Abbey.
