= Ralf Meister =

German Lutheran theologian

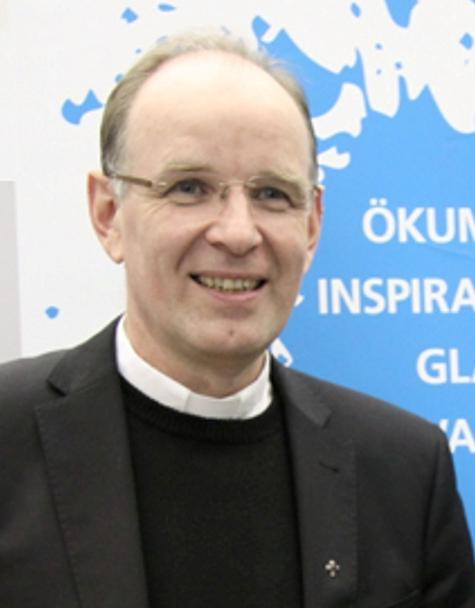
Ralf Meister (2013)

Ralf Meister (born 5 January 1962 in Hamburg-Neugraben) is a German Lutheran theologian, former General Superintendent (regional bishop) of Berlin, and Landesbischof of the Evangelical-Lutheran Church of Hanover.

== Biography ==
Meister studied at the University of Hamburg and the Hebrew University of Jerusalem Theology and Jewish Studies. He was ordained at St. Michaelis Church, Hamburg on 28 May 1992. In September 2001 he became Provost of the Lübeck district of the North Elbian Evangelical Lutheran Church. On Pentecost 2008 he was invested as General Superintendent of Berlin at the Kaiser Wilhelm Memorial Church, succeeding Martin-Michael Passauer, who retired. On 25 November 2010 the Synod of the Evangelical-Lutheran Church of Hanover elected Meister as Landesbischof, winning 64 of 76 votes in the second round. Meister's investment as bishop will be held at the Marktkirche in Hanover on 26 March 2011. He succeeded Margot Käßmann who stepped down as Landesbischof on 24 February 2010.

On 22 January 2005 he gave the "Wort zum Sonntag" on the German national television for the first time.

Ralf Meister is married to Dagmar Ulrich-Meister and has three children, Juval, Lotta and Tom-Lasse.

== Demands for resignation in 2024 ==
In early 2024, Meister came under criticism after it had become known that the Evangelical-Lutheran Church of Hanover had not evaluated the personnel files as contractually agreed for the large-scale ForuM study on the processing of sexual violence in the Protestant Church in Germany (EKD), but only the disciplinary files. In March 2024, Meister was criticized again after the presentation of a scientific report on the way the Evangelical-Lutheran Church of Hanover dealt with a survivor of sexual violence. This report showed that even after 2010, the year in which many survivors of German churches spoke out, Meister’s church tried not to further process the case. The survivor contacted Meister’s church repeatedly, but to no avail and was turned away. This survivor of the Oesede case demanded Meister's resignation which Meister, however, refused, claiming he had searched his conscience thoroughly. He stated that sexualized violence abuse was not the only issue in his church ad referred that there were positive developments in the church which he then claimed were results of his actions. During a press conference in March 2024, Meister admitted that he had prevented contact with survivors of sexual violence in the past. At the beginning of June 2024, more than 200 pastors and other church employees signed an open letter criticizing Meister's handling of sexual abuse cases. In June 2024, the a survivors’ initiative named “Meisterhafte Vertuschung beenden” - a wordplay on Meister’s surname, meaning “end the masterly cover-up”' called for his resignation. In July 2024, the regional church revised the number of victims of sexual violence upwards from 140 to 190 and admitted that more cases were known than had been previously communicated. In fact, survivors themselves had discovered through inspection of files that the Evangelical-Lutheran Church of Hanover had not included all cases that were known to it in the official statistics and in the ForuM study. More survivors joined the initiative "End the Masterful Cover-up" and also called for Ralf Meister's resignation. The Evangelical-Lutheran Church of Hanover also admitted that victims of sexual violence who had contacted the regional church with information in the past were regularly turned away.

Titles in Lutheranism
Preceded by Margot Käßmann	Landesbischof of Hanover; 2011-present	Incumbent
