= Mejer =

Mejer is a surname. Notable people with the surname include:

- Johannes Mejer (1606–1674), Danish mathematician and cartographer
- Otto Mejer (1818–1893), German canon law specialist and church historian
- Poul Mejer (1931–2000), Danish footballer
