= Ilsemarie Meyer =

German lawyer and judge

President of the Bremen State Court

President of the Bremen Higher Administrative Court
- In office November 2008 – 2019

President of the Court of Justice of the Confederation of Protestant Churches in Lower Saxony
- Incumbent
- Assumed office 2004

Personal details
- Born: Wulmstorf, Lower Saxony, Germany
- Occupation: Lawyer, judge

Ilsemarie Meyer is a German lawyer, judge and the recently retired president of the Bremen State Court. She has also served, since 2004, as president of the Court of Justice of the Confederation of Protestant Churches in Lower Saxony.

== Life ==
Ilsemarie Meyer was born at Wulmstorf (Thedinghausen), a short distance upriver from Bremen. She attended school in nearby Verden, passing her Abitur (school final exam) in 1971, thereby opening the way to university level education. Between 1971 and 1977 Meyer studied Jurisprudence at the Philipps University in Marburg. She passed her level 1 national law exams in February 1977. This was followed by a two year legal traineeship in the district covered by the District High Court in Bremen. She passed her level 2 national law exams during 1979.

In 1980 Meyer took a post as a probationary judge at the Administrative Court (Verwaltungsgericht) in Oldenburg. In February 1983 the judicial appointment was confirmed and made permanent. Between September 1990 and June 1991 she served as a judge at the Bremen Administrative Court (Verwaltungsgericht). In July 1991 she accepted an invitation to return to Lower Saxony, (Note: For reasons of history Bremen and its immediate surrounds are administered as a stand-alone federal state, surrounded on all sides by the federal state of Lower Saxony (Niedersachsen).) taking a judicial appointment at the Regional High Court (Oberverwaltungsgericht) at Lüneburg. In parallel, she was sent back to fill a gap at Administrative Court (Verwaltungsgericht) in Bremen where she temporarily took on the duties of court vice-president. In 1992, however, it was Karen Buse who took the post of vice-president in Bremen, while Ilsemarie Meyer pursued her judicial career in Lüneburg for the next sixteen years.

On 5 June 1998 she was appointed senior judge (Vorsitzenden Richterin) at the Regional High Court. On 22 August 2005 Ilsemarie Meyer received from the hands of Court President Herwig van Nieuwland her certificate of appointment as vice-president of the Lower Saxony Regional High Court (Oberverwaltungsgericht), in succession to Hans Karsten Schmaltz, who had retired the previous November.

On 2008 she returned to Bremen, appointed in November as president of the Bremen Higher Administrative Court (Oberverwaltungsgericht). In 2011 she also took over as president of the Bremen State Court. On 1 July 2019, by now aged 66, Ilsemarie Meyer retired from her secular judicial appointments.

Alongside her judicial work in the secular courts, in 2004 Ilsemarie Meyer took over as president of the Court of Justice of the Confederation of Protestant Churches in Lower Saxony (Rechtshof der Konföderation evangelischer Kirchen in Niedersachsen) in succession to Manfred-Carl Schinkel. Since 2017 she has also served as a member of the national constitutional court of the Evangelical Church in Germany (Evangelische Kirche in Deutschland / EKD) federation of protestant churches.
