= Hanns Lilje =

German Lutheran bishop

His Eminence Hanns Lilje
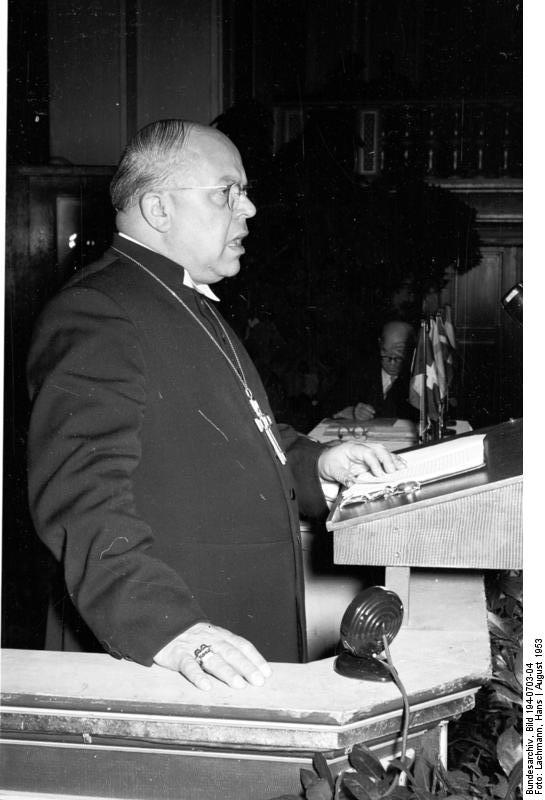
- Lilje in 1953
- Church: Lutheran
- Diocese: Hanover
- See: Presiding Bishop of the VELKD
- Installed: 1955
- Term ended: 1969
- Predecessor: Hans Meiser
- Successor: Hans-Otto Wölber
- Other post: Landesbischof of Hannover

Personal details
- Born: 20 August 1899 Hannover, Kingdom of Prussia, German Empire
- Died: 6 January 1977 (aged 77) Hannover, West Germany
- Buried: Loccum Abbey
- Denomination: Lutheran

Johannes (Hanns) Ernst Richard Lilje (20 August 1899, in Hannover – 6 January 1977, in Hannover) was a German Lutheran bishop and one of the pioneers of the ecumenical movement.

Lilje was general secretary of the German Student Christian Movement 1924–34. He was involved in Confessing Church struggle in Nazi Germany from 1933 onwards. After World War II he became the bishop of the Evangelical Lutheran State Church of Hanover in 1947 until his retirement. He was also the presiding bishop of the United Evangelical Lutheran Church of Germany 1955–69, president of the Lutheran World Federation and World Council of Churches. He was also abbot of Loccum under title Johannes XI.

Following WWII Lilje authored "The Valley of the Shadow" about his experiences during his imprisonment by the Nazis. He was at Dachau concentration camp before being transferred to Buchenwald where he was held in solitary confinement. He was tortured to extract a confession as well as reveal names of other clergy who were working to rid Germany of Hitler. Even his Bible was taken from him but he knew the scriptures well enough to find strength in various verses. His favorite was Romans 14:8 "For whether we live unto the Lord or die unto the Lord; whether we live therefore or die, we are the Lord's!"

In 1964, Lilje consecrated Stefano Moshi, first presiding bishop of the Evangelical Lutheran Church in Tanzania.

Titles in Lutheranism
Preceded by Hans Meiser	Presiding Bishop of the VELKD; 1955–1969	Succeeded by Hans-Otto Wölber
Preceded by August Marahrens	Landesbischof of Hanover; 1947–1971	Succeeded by Eduard Lohse
