= Gerhard Müller (Lutheran theologian) =

German Lutheran theologian (1929–2024)

- Müller, c. 2000
- Born: 10 May 1929; Marburg, Prussia, German Republic
- Died: 10 May 2024 (aged 95); Erlangen, Bavaria, Germany
- Education: University of Marburg; University of Göttingen; University of Tübingen
- Religion: Lutheranism
- Church: Lutheran Church in Brunswick
- Offices held: Landesbischof

Gerhard Müller (10 May 1929 – 10 May 2024) was a German Lutheran theologian. He served as Landesbischof of the Lutheran Church in Brunswick between 1982 and 1994, during German reunification, when he also was the leading bishop of the United Lutheran Church of Germany. As a theologian, teaching in Erlangen and Göttingen, he focused on the history of the Reformation, and was editor of the Theologische Realenzyklopädie. He received international recognition such as a membership of the Royal Netherlands Academy of Arts and Sciences and an honorary doctorate from the University of St Andrews.

== Life and career ==
Müller was born in Marburg on 10 May 1929. He studied Protestant theology at the University of Marburg, University of Göttingen and the University of Tübingen. Müller was professor of historical theology at the University of Erlangen for 15 years, from 1967 to 1982. He focused on church history, especially as a scholar of Martin Luther and the Reformation. He was editor of the Theologische Realenzyklopädie.

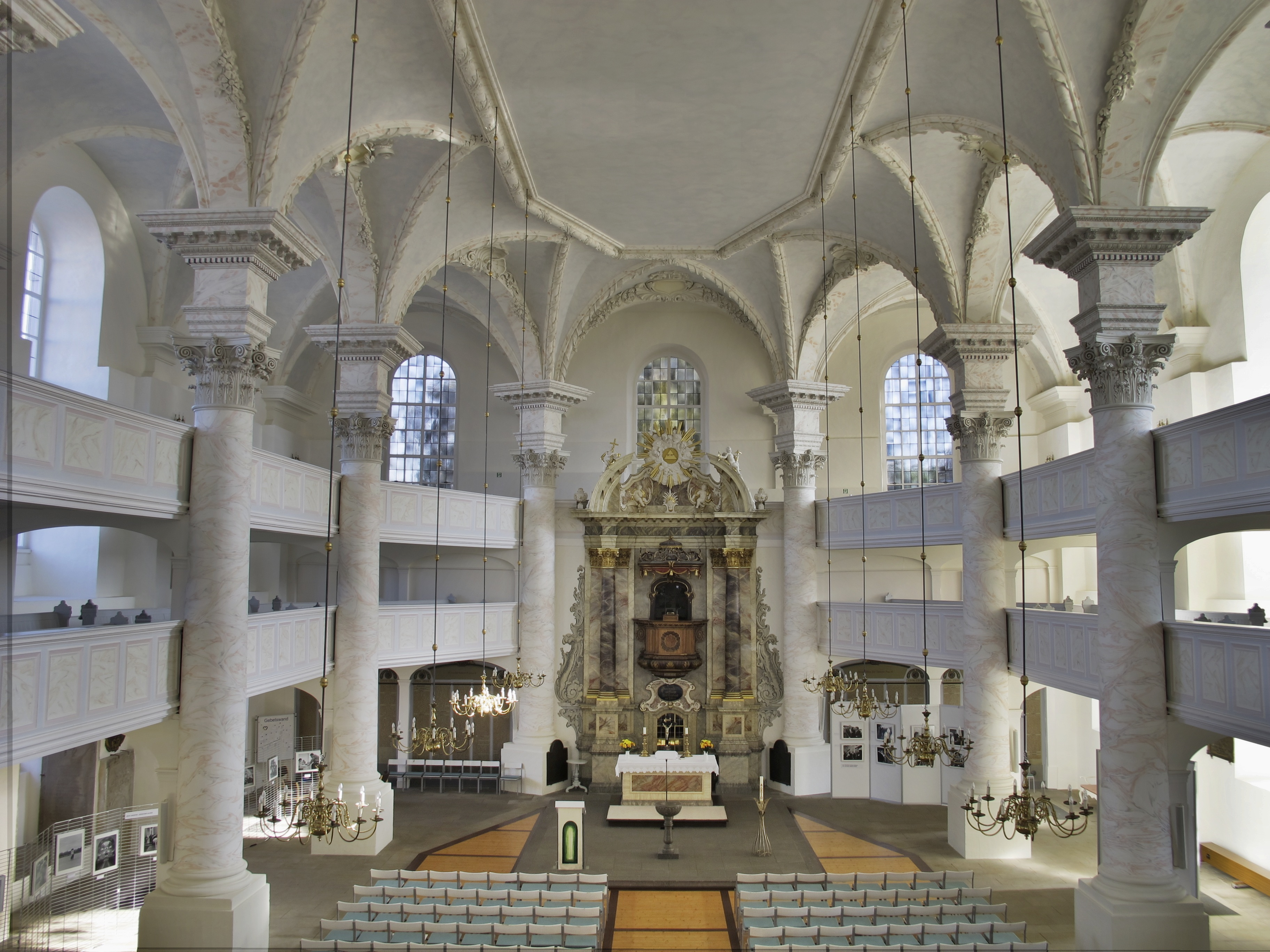
TSt. Trinitatis, Wolfenbüttel

On 1 October 1982, he became Landesbischof of the Lutheran Church in Brunswick, with its seat in Wolfenbüttel, serving until 31 May 1994. He focused on the spiritual care of pastors and their families. Faced with rising numbers of people leaving the church, he supported projects seeking more intense contact with members such as the missionary "Neu anfangen". He contacted also influential people outside the church such as mayors, managers and scientists. After German reunification, two parishes, Blankenburg and Calvörde, were returned into the Brunswick Church in 1992. Müller had visited Blankenburg immediately when the border was opened, to establish contact. During his tenure as bishop, he taught church history at the Göttingen University.

From 1990 to 1993, Müller also served as Leading Bishop (German: Leitender Bischof) of the United Lutheran Church of Germany, after three years as vice bishop.

Müller was elected a foreign member of the Royal Netherlands Academy of Arts and Sciences in 1979. He was a member of the Akademie der Wissenschaften und der Literatur. Müller received an honorary doctorate from the University of St Andrews in 1980.

Müller died in Erlangen on 10 May 2024, his 95th birthday, after a long illness.

== Publications ==
- Einsichten Martin Luthers – damals und jetzt. Analyse und Kritik, Martin-Luther-Verlag, Erlangen 2015, ISBN 978-3-87513-188-8.
- with Hägglund, Bengt: Kirche in der Schule Luthers. Festschrift für D. Joachim Heubach, Martin-Luther-Verlag, Erlangen 1995, ISBN 978-3-87513-100-0.
- Zwischen Reformation und Gegenwart.
  - vol. 1: Vorträge, Aufsätze, Predigten. Lutherisches Verlags-Haus, Hannover 1983, ISBN 3-87502-148-7.
  - vol. 2: Vorträge und Aufsätze. Lutherisches Verlags-Haus, Hannover 1988, ISBN 3-7859-0554-8.
- Die Rechtfertigungslehre. Geschichte und Probleme. Gütersloher Verlagshaus Mohn, Gütersloh 1977, ISBN 3-579-04460-5.
