= Theologische Realenzyklopädie =

German encyclopedia on religion and theology

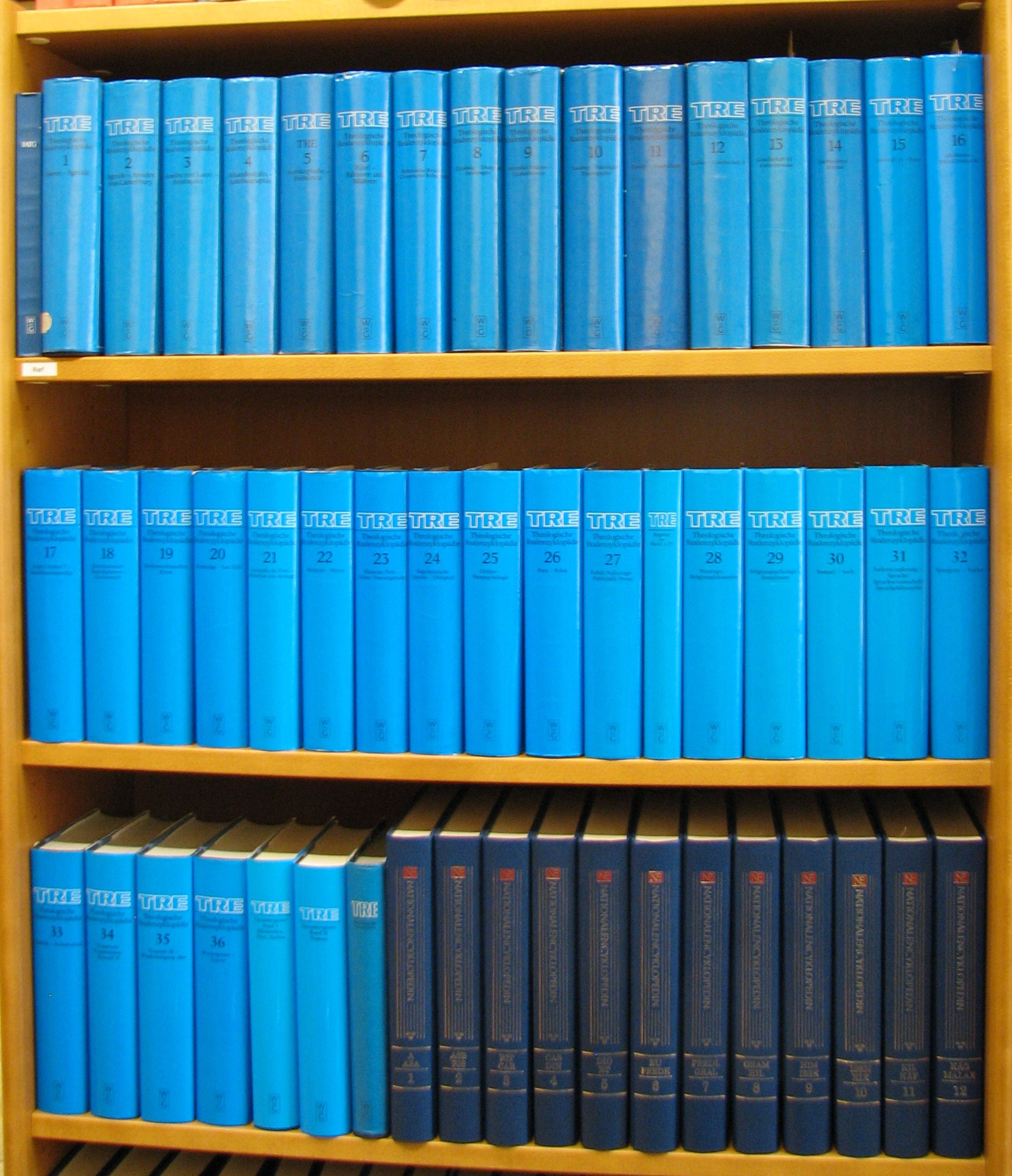
Theologische Realenzyklopädie

The Theologische Realenzyklopädie (TRE) is a German encyclopedia of theology and religious studies. It contains some 2000 articles in 36 volumes. The first installment was published in 1977, the last in 2004.

== Genesis and editors ==
The Theologische Realenzyklopädie is published by Walter de Gruyter and continues the nineteenth-century tradition of specialized encyclopedias, specifically that of the Realenzyklopädie für protestantische Theologie und Kirche, published in Leipzig between 1896 and 1913. But in contrast to the latter, the TRE treats its subjects in an ecumenical fashion.

The TRE was edited by fourteen main editors. The primary editor was the bishop of the Lutheran Church in Brunswick and church historian Gerhard Müller. Until volume 12 his fellow main editor was Gerhard Krause, professor of theology at the University of Bonn.

== Publication information ==
- Gerhard Müller, Horst Balz, Gerhard Krause (eds.): Theologische Realenzyklopädie. 36 vols. De Gruyter, Berlin 1976–2004. ISBN 3-11-002218-4 / ISBN 3-11-013898-0 / ISBN 3-11-016295-4; Compact edition: ISBN 3-11-013898-0 / ISBN 3-11-016295-4

== See also ==
- Biographisch-Bibliographisches Kirchenlexikon
- Lexikon für Theologie und Kirche
- List of encyclopedias by branch of knowledge
