= Margot Käßmann =

German theologian and bishop (born 1958)

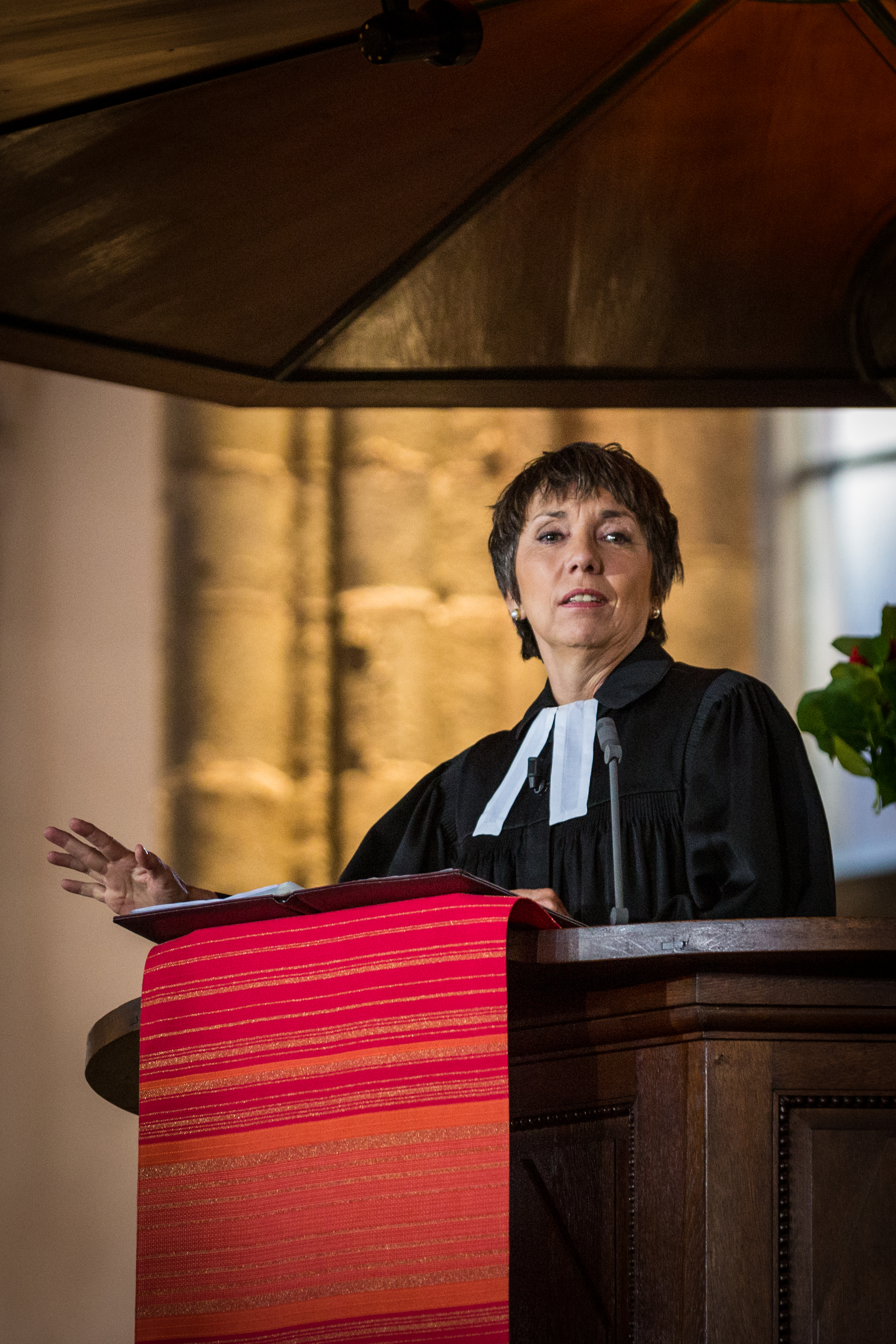
- Käßmann preaching in Strasbourg, France, October 2015
- Born: Margot Schulze; 3 June 1958 (age 68); Marburg, West Germany
- Education: University of Tübingen; New College, Edinburgh; University of Göttingen; University of Marburg
- Spouse: Eckhard Käßmann (m. 1981; div. 2007)
- Children: 4

Margot Käßmann (German: [ˈmaʁɡɔt ˈkɛːsman]; born 3 June 1958) is a Lutheran theologian, who was Landesbischöfin (bishop) of the Evangelical-Lutheran Church of Hanover in Germany. On 28 October 2009, she was also elected to lead the Protestant Church in Germany, a federation of Protestant church bodies in Germany. (Note: In the German context, "Evangelical" corresponds roughly to "mainline Protestant" rather than to "Evangelicalism" as understood in English-speaking countries.) She stepped down from both offices on 24 February 2010 following a drink-driving incident. After serving as a "Reformation Ambassador" for the 500th anniversary of the Reformation, she retired in 2018.

== Biography ==
Käßmann was born Margot Schulze in Marburg. She passed her Abitur at the Elisabethschule Marburg in 1977 and studied Protestant theology at the universities of Tübingen, Edinburgh, Göttingen and Marburg. During her studies, she participated among other things in archaeological excavations in 1978 of several weeks' duration in Akko, Israel. In 1983 she became a "Vikarin" (German for a pastor in the practical training phase of her education) in Wolfhagen, near Kassel. She also attended the Hotchkiss School on a scholarship by ASSIST.

She participated as a youth delegate in the 1983 plenary assembly of the World Council of Churches (WCC) in Vancouver, where she became the youngest member of the central committee. Between 1991 and 1998, she was a member of the executive committee of the WCC.

After her ministerial ordination in 1985, she became the village pastor of Frielendorf-Spieskappel in the Schwalm-Eder-Kreis, together with her husband, from whom she was divorced in 2007.

Käßmann earned her Ph.D. under Konrad Raiser, at the Ruhr University Bochum, with a thesis on the topic "Poverty and Wealth as an Inquiry into the Unity of the Church". In 1990, she was assigned to the Evangelical Church's volunteer service, and from 1992 to 1994, she was director of studies at the Evangelical Academy at Hofgeismar. Between 1994 and 1999, she was General Secretary of the Deutscher Evangelischer Kirchentag (German Protestant Church Congress). In 1999, she was elected bishop of the Evangelical Lutheran Church of Hanover; she was the first woman to hold this office. In 2006 she underwent a breast cancer operation.

In 2002 she resigned from the WCC Central Committee after the results of a Special Commission on the participation of Orthodox churches in the WCC recommended that the term "ecumenical worship" be dropped, and that there be much clearer guidelines about what was termed "interconfessional common prayer". She is currently a member of the central committee of the Conference of European Churches.

Margot Käßmann currently sits on the Advisor Board for the German Foundation for World Population. In addition, she was involved as an ambassador for the 2006 FIFA World Cup for people with mental handicaps, held in Germany.

Käßmann is vocal in her objections to the political far right. She argued for a ban on the National Democratic Party of Germany claiming that the church ought not to "avert its eyes" as it had in 1933. She asked: "How can we tell young people that they should not support this party if it is officially permitted?"

In January 2009, Käßmann expressed the opinion that it might be better to tear down former and unused churches than to allow them to be used for purposes that could damage their image. As examples of such purposes, she mentioned conversion into restaurants, discothèques, or mosques. A reassignment to a synagogue, however, she found positive. After protests from Muslims, she slightly qualified her statement, saying: "If a Christian congregation is convinced that the use as a mosque can happen in deepest peace, I concur, but at the moment I do not see that possibility."

In May 2010, Käßmann was a keynote speaker at the 2nd Ecumenical Kirchentag (German Evangelical Lutheran Church and Roman Catholic Church Congress) in Munich, Bavaria, where she also led the night prayer at Marienplatz on the final evening of the event. She taught at Emory University from August – December 2010. As of 1 January 2011, she was a guest professor at the Ruhr University Bochum where she had earned her PhD in 1989.

Käßmann has supported, over the years, the Freya von Moltke Foundation in many ways. In 2011 she conducted a speech for Freya von Moltke's 100 birthday celebration in Cologne.

She is a pacifist and believes there can be no just wars.

== Family ==
Käßmann has four daughters. She was the first German bishop to file for divorce, in 2007, and on 6 August 2007 it was communicated to the church senate that her divorce was legally valid. The church senate and the leadership of the Church of Hanover supported Käßmann and endorsed her continued tenure of the bishop's office, as did the leader of a conservative center.

== Chair of the Council of the Protestant Church in Germany ==
She was a member of the Council of the Protestant Church in Germany, and on 28 October 2009 she was elected Chair of the Council, the first woman in that position. She received 132 of the 142 votes cast, and said she wanted the church to be more contemporary and hoped to attract more people to it.

Her election provoked negative reactions from the leadership of the Russian Orthodox Church which declared that it was ready to suspend its dialogue with German Lutherans because of Käßmann's non-traditional views and her unusual status as a female Protestant bishop.

On 20 February 2010, Käßmann was pulled over for driving through a red traffic light in Hanover. A blood test measured her blood alcohol level at 1.54 per mille (1.54 g/L or 0.154%), above the legal limit of 0.5 per mille (0.5 g/L or 0.05%). Her license was confiscated immediately. Despite receiving a vote of confidence from the council of the Protestant Church in Germany, she stepped down from her office as leader of the Evangelical Church and as bishop on 24 February 2010. The following month, Käßmann accepted a sentence comprising a fine of €8000 and withdrawal of her driver's license for a minimum of 10 months.

Käßmann caused widespread comment and controversy in 2017 when she criticized right-wing political party AfD policy, saying at a Bible workshop during the Evangelical Church Convention:

No longer a question, now it is clear. Women should have children if they are 'bio-German'. This is a new right-wing definition of native in accordance with the so-called little Aryan paragraph of the National Socialists: two German parents, four German grandparents. That's when you know from where the brown wind is really blowing.

== Honours ==
- 2001: Käßmann received the preaching prize (Predigtpreis) for exemplary achievements in the area of the proclamation of the Gospel.
- 2002: She received an honorary doctorate from the faculty of pedagogy at Hannover University.

== Russo-Ukrainian War ==
After the start of the 2022 Russian invasion of Ukraine, Käßmann repeatedly criticized the delivery of weapons to Ukraine, calling for a diplomatic solution to the conflict instead. In February 2023, Käßmann was one of the initial signers of Manifest für Frieden, a petition calling for an end to military support to Ukraine.

== Published works ==
- Die eucharistische Vision (The Eucharistic Vision). Gütersloh 1992, ISBN 3-579-02071-4
- with Rüdiger Runge (ed.): Kirche in Bewegung. 50 Jahre Deutscher Evangelischer Kirchentag. (Church in Flux: Fifty Years of the Deutscher Evangelischer Kirchentag) Gütersloher Verlagshaus, Gütersloh 1999
- Gewalt überwinden. Eine Dekade des Ökumenischen Rates der Kirchen. (Overcoming violence: A decade of the WCC) Hannover 2000, ISBN 3-7859-0803-2
- Erziehen als Herausforderung (The Challenge of Childraising) Freiburg 2002, ISBN 978-3-451-05197-5
- Auf gutem Grund. Standpunkte und Predigten (On Good Ground: Standpoints and Homilies) Hannover 2002, ISBN 978-3-7859-0877-8
- Kirche in gesellschaftlichen Konflikten. Kirchenleitende Predigten (The Church in social conflict: Homilies for Church Leaders) Stuttgart 2003, ISBN 978-3-17-017901-1
- Was können wir hoffen – was können wir tun? Antworten und Orientierung. (What can we hope – what can we do? Answers and Advice) Freiburg 2003, ISBN 978-3-451-05385-6
- Ökumene am Scheideweg. (Ecumenical Christianity at a Schism) Hannover 2003, ISBN 978-3-7859-0878-5
- Wenn das Leben voller Fragen ist. Briefe der Zuwendung (When life is full of questions: letters of devotion) Freiburg 2004, ISBN 978-3-451-05460-0
- Gut zu leben. Gedanken für jeden Tag. (It's good to be alive: prayers of thanks for every day) Freiburg 2004, ISBN 978-3-451-05552-2
- In der Welt habt ihr Angst... (You are afraid in the world...) Mit Beiträgen von Angelika Beer, Dorothea Bobzin, Horst Hirschler, Wolfgang Schäuble u. a. Hannover 2004, ISBN 978-3-7859-0905-8
- Wurzeln, die uns Flügel schenken (Roots, which give us wings) Gütersloh 2005, ISBN 978-3-579-06908-1
- with Wolfgang Huber and Manfred Kock: Wenn eure Kinder morgen fragen. Zur Zukunft der evangelischen Kirche. Im Gespräch. (If your children ask tomorrow: on the future of the evangelical church – in interview) Freiburg 2005, ISBN 978-3-451-28600-1
- Wie ist es so im Himmel? Kinderfragen fordern uns heraus. (What's it like in Heaven? Children's questions challenge us) Freiburg 2006, ISBN 978-3-451-29035-0
- (ed.): Ökumene bewegt. Die Kirchen auf dem Weg zueinander. (Ecumenism in motion: churches moving together) Stuttgart 2006, ISBN 978-3-7831-2530-6
- Mehr als fromme Wünsche. Was mich bewegt. (More than pious wishes: what moves me) Freiburg 2007, ISBN 978-3-451-05852-3
- Gesät ist die Hoffnung. 14 Begegnungen auf dem Kreuzweg Jesu. (Hope has been sown: Fourteen Encounters on Jesus' Way of the Cross) Freiburg 2007, ISBN 978-3-451-29356-6
- Matthias Micheel (Hrsg.): Ein Engel möge dich begleiten.(An Angel would like to accompany you) Texte von Hermann Multhaupt, Anselm Grün, Margot Käßmann, Norbert Blüm u. a. Leipzig 2007, ISBN 978-3-7462-2310-0 (new edition)
- Mit Herzen, Mund und Händen. Spiritualität im Alltag leben. Gütersloh 2007, ISBN 978-3-579-06442-0; English translation: With Hearts, Hands and Voices: Spirituality for Everyday Life. Geneva 2007, ISBN 978-2-8254-1522-1
- Mit Leib und Seele auf dem Weg. Handbuch des Pilgerns in der hannoverschen Landeskirche. Hannover 2007, ISBN 978-3-7859-0946-1

== Notes ==
Titles in Lutheranism
Preceded by Horst Hirschler	Landesbischof of Hanover; 1999–2010	Succeeded by Ralf Meister
