= United Evangelical Lutheran Church of Germany =

German Christian denomination

The United Evangelical Lutheran Church of Germany (German: Vereinigte Evangelisch-Lutherische Kirche Deutschlands, VELKD) was founded on July 8, 1948, in Eisenach, Germany. Its total membership is 7.3 million people. All its member churches belong to the Protestant Church in Germany, with which it co-operates closely. In 2018 it has been reduced from an independent legal entity to an administrative unit within the larger Protestant Church in Germany.

The seat of the VELKD is in Hanover. The leading bishop (German: Leitender Bischof) is Ralf Meister.

== Leading Bishops of the VELKD ==
- 1948–1949: Wilhelm Henke
- 1949–1955: Hans Meiser
- 1955–1969: Johannes Lilje
- 1969–1975: Hans-Otto Wölber, Land Bishop of Hamburg
- 1975–1978: Eduard Lohse
- 1978–1981: Gerhard Heintze
- 1981–1990: Karlheinz Stoll
- 1990–1993: Gerhard Müller
- 1993–1999: Horst Hirschler
- 1999–2005: Hans Christian Knuth
- 2005–2011: Johannes Friedrich
- 2011-2018: Gerhard Ulrich
- since 2018: Ralf Meister

== President of the Church Office of the VELKD ==
- 1949-1963: Heinz Brunotte
- 1963-1967: Max Keller-Hüschemenger
- 1968-1976: Hugo Schnell
- 1976–1982: Günther Gaßmann
- 1983-2000: Friedrich-Otto Scharbau
- 2000-2015: Friedrich Hauschildt ( also Vice-President of the Office of the Protestant Church in Germany (EKD), between 2007 and 2015)
- 2015-2023: Horst Gorski (also Vice-President of EKD between 2015 and 2023)
- since 2023: Stephan Schaede (also Vice-President of EKD since 2023)

== Members ==
- Evangelical Lutheran Church in Bavaria
- Evangelical Lutheran State Church of Brunswick
- Evangelical Lutheran Church of Hanover
- Evangelical Lutheran Church in Northern Germany
- Evangelical Lutheran Church of Saxony
- Evangelical Lutheran State Church of Schaumburg-Lippe
- Evangelical Church in Central Germany (since 2009)
