= Elisabethschule Marburg =

Coordinates: 50°48′N 8°45′E

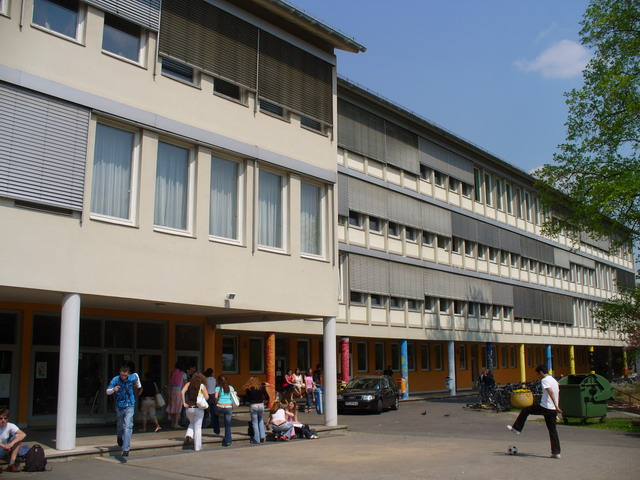
Elisabethschule
| School type: | Gymnasium |
| Location: | Marburg, Germany |
| Established: | 1879 |
| Enrollment: | 1237 |
| Faculty: | 105 |
| Principal: | Gunnar Merle |
Contact
| Address: | Elisabethschule Marburg; Gymnasium; Leopold-Lucas-Straße 5; 35037 Marburg |
| Website: | www.elisabethschule.de |

The Elisabethschule is a Gymnasium in Marburg.

== History ==
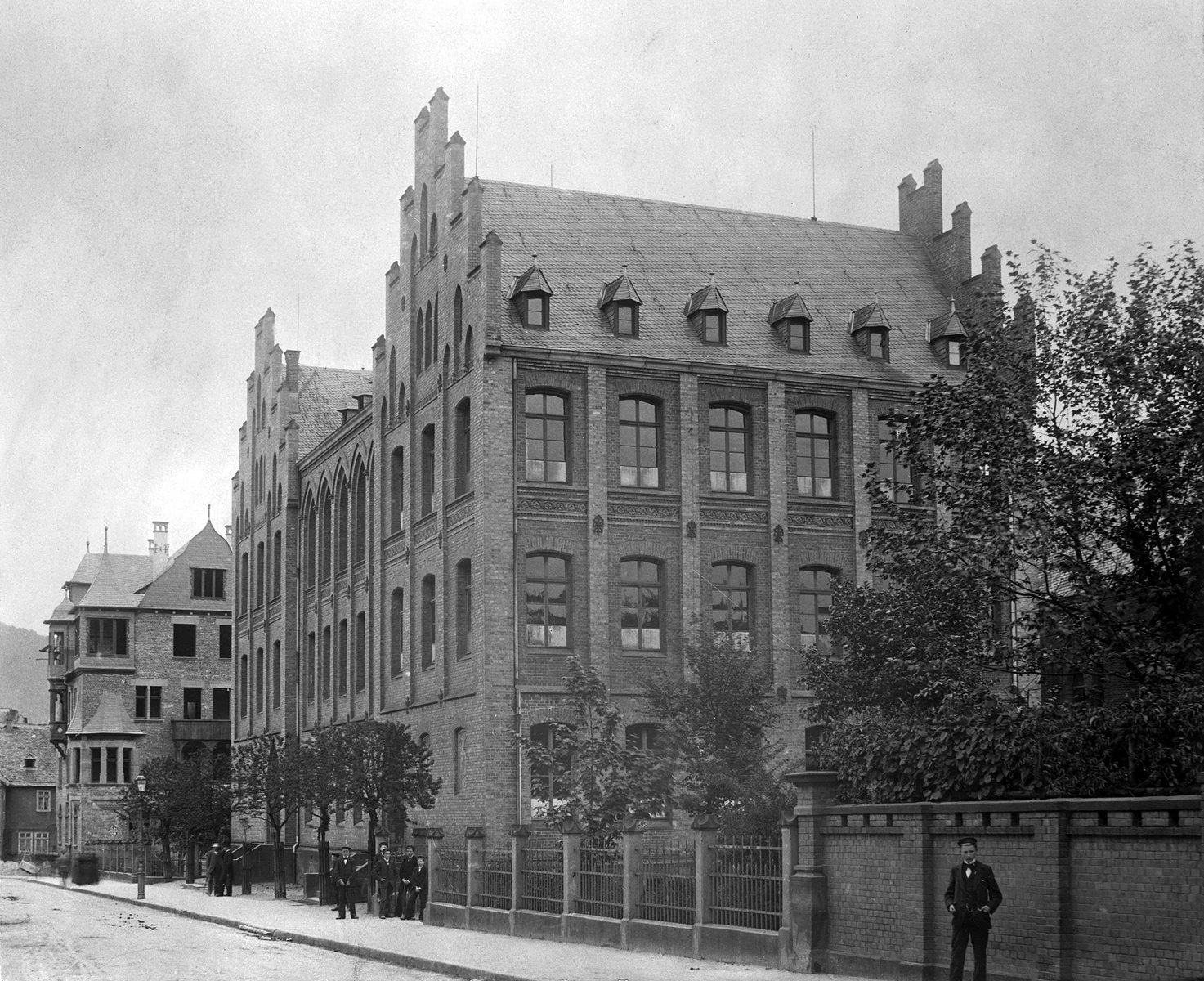
The first school building in the Universitätsstraße about 1898

The Elisabethschule was founded in 1879 as Höhere Töchterschule. It was a school only for girls in this time. The first school building was located in the Universitätsstraße in the centre of Marburg. During the 1950s the new building in the Leopold-Lucas-Straße in Marburg Ockershausen was established. Since 1969 also boys were allowed to attend the school.

Between 1936 and 1938 all jewish school girls and teachers were forced to leave the school. In 1993 a memorial was established in the form of a star of David for the 66 jewish victims of the school (pupils and teachers) caused by the Nazi regime.

== Foreign languages ==
The first foreign language is English starting in 5th grade. In the 6th grade French or Latin is offered and in the 8th grade the student can choose another modern language like Spanish.

== Notable alumni ==
- Margot Käßmann - bishop of the Evangelical Church of Hanover
- Roland Suso Richter - film director
- Victoria Mayer - actress
- Lars Weißenfeldt - football (soccer) player

== Partner schools ==
The Elisabethschule has a partnership with the Redland High School for Girls in Bristol, England and with some other schools in Europe.
