= August Marahrens =

German bishop (1875-1950)

- Landesbischof
- Church: Evangelical-Lutheran Church of Hanover

Personal details
- Born: August Friedrich Karl Marahrens; October 11, 1875 Hanover, Lower Saxony, Germany
- Died: May 3, 1950 (aged 74) Loccum, Lower Saxony, Germany
- Denomination: Lutheran

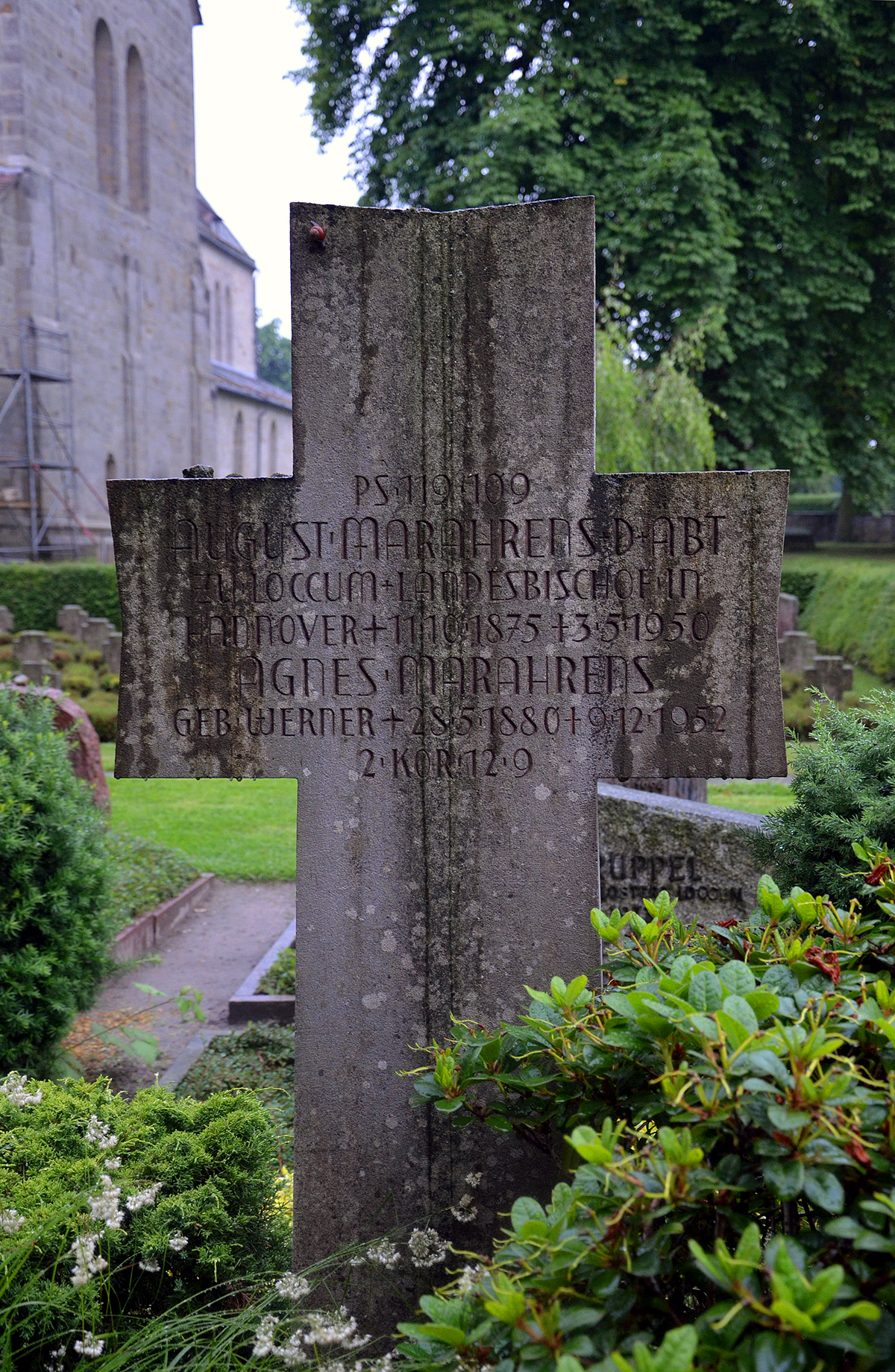
Marahrens' tomb.

August Friedrich Karl Marahrens (11 October 1875, in Hanover – 3 May 1950, in Loccum, Lower Saxony) was a German Protestant bishop who served as Landesbischof of the Evangelical-Lutheran Church of Hanover

== Bibliography ==
- Paul Fleisch: Landesbischof D. Marahrens. In: Lutherische Kirche, Heft 20, 1935, 353–356.
- Friedrich Duensing (ed.): Der Landesbischof und die Kirche. 1935.
- Friedrich Duensing: Der Abschied Seiner Hochwürden des Landesbischofs D. Marahrens aus dem Bischofamte. 1947.

Titles in Lutheranism
New title	Landesbischof of Hanover; 1925–1947	Succeeded by Hanns Lilje
