= Paul Gerhard Jahn =

German professor and theologian

Paul Gerhard Jahn (9 May 1925 in Berlin - 12 July 2004 in Hanover) was a German professor and theologian. He was a founding principal of the Evangelic University of Hanover and Director of the Office for Community Service (Today: House of church Offices), the Evangelical Lutheran Church of Hanover.

== Life ==
After studying theology was Jahn Arbeiterprädikant and later social welfare pastor in the Evangelical Academy of Friedewald. From 1961 to 1971 he headed the Wichern-School of Social Work in Hanover. As of 1971, Jahn served as founding rector of the Protestant University of Applied Sciences and Arts. In 1975 he was appointed director of the Office of Community Service. From the year 1979, he was also the first Commissioner for the Environment (German: Umweltbeauftragter) of the Evangelical Lutheran Church of Hanover and the Confederation of Protestant Churches in Lower Saxony(German: Konföderation evangelischer Kirchen in Niedersachsen). In 1990 he went into retirement.
