= Landeskirchenamt Hannover =

Authority for the administration of the Evangelical Lutheran Church of Hanover

Coordinates: 52.371617°N 9.728072°E

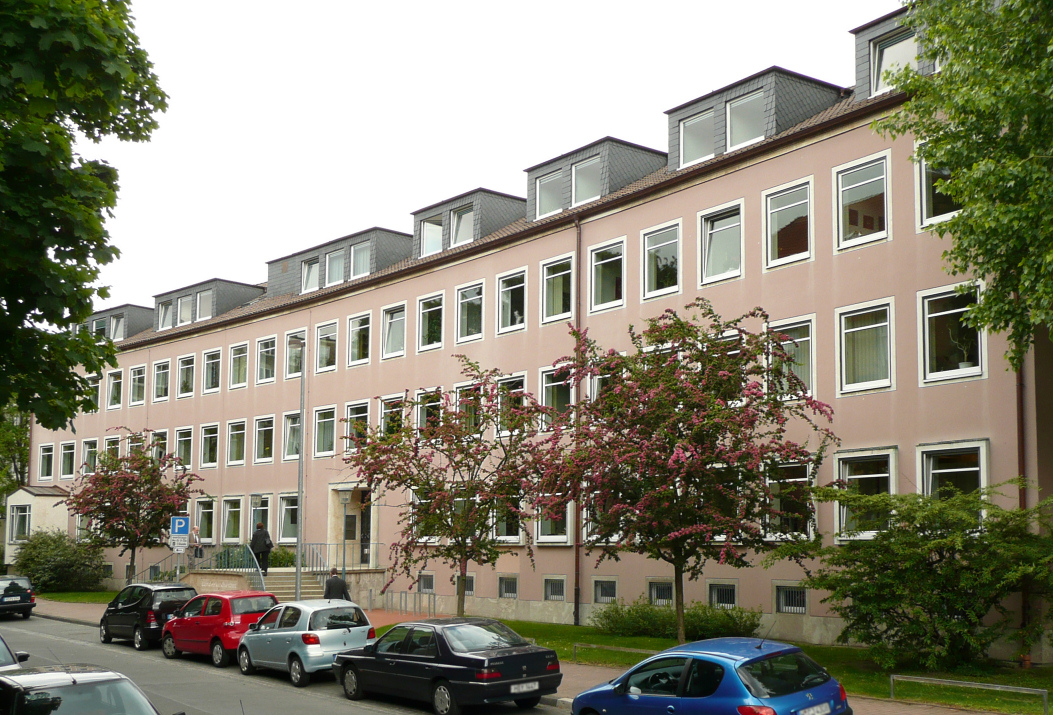
Entrance of the Regional Church Office

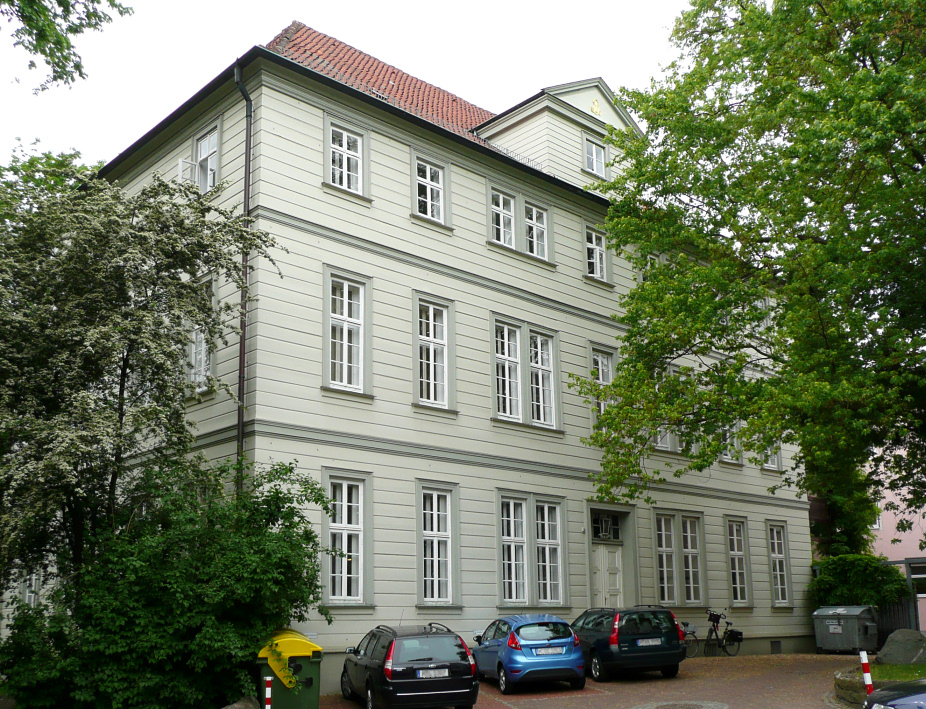
Fürstenhof at the back of the Regional Church Office with the seat of some offices

The Hanover Regional Church Office (LKA) serves as the supreme administrative authority for the administration of the Evangelical Lutheran Church of Hanover and was formed from the Consistory of this regional church. The Regional Church Office is one of the five Church Governing Constitutional Organs of the Regional Church of Hanover. The ecclesiastical authority is headquartered at Rote Reihe 6 street in the Calenberger Neustadt district in Hanover, in Germany's state of Lower Saxony.

== History ==
After World War II, the Regional Church Office was located in the Hanns-Lilje-Haus from 1947 to 1957.

== Tasks ==
The Regional Church Office manages the affairs of the regional church and supervises the ecclesiastical corporations within the regional church, represents the regional church in legal and administrative matters, and oversees Church Office holders. Primary tasks of the Regional Church Office include handling theological fundamental questions, representing church positions in society, culture, and politics, preserving and developing church law and the efficient organization of the regional church, and securing the finances of the regional church.

The Regional Church Office is the publisher of the Church Official Gazette for the Evangelical Lutheran Church of Hanover.

== Organization ==
=== Departments ===
Since 2010, the agency has been divided into eight departments, to which bureaus are assigned, and other service and business offices. Until 2010, the Regional Church Office was divided into more than twenty Departments.

- Department 1: Leadership with the accompaniment of the church governing bodies, Church and State
- Department 2: Theology and Congregation, ecclesiastical fields of action, Mission and Ecumenism
- Department 3: Personnel, Training and Further Education
- Department 4: Education, School, Children and Youth
- Department 5: Diakonie
- Department 6: Financial Economy and Information Technology
- Department 7: Legal Department
- Department 8: Real Estate Economy, Environmental Protection

The Regional Church Office houses the office of the Synod of the regional church and is the seat of the Personnel Committee, which is formed by the church governing bodies. It was until 2019 the seat of the office of the Church Senate. About 220 employees work at the Regional Church Office on 193.60 positions, including 95 church officials (as of 2014). In 1992, there were still 296 positions. In 2023, 350 employees are employed at the Regional Church Office and the affiliated offices.

The spokesperson for the Hanoverian Regional Church works for all church governing bodies of the regional church and for the Confederation of Protestant Churches in Lower Saxony and is assigned to the president. He is integrated into the Evangelical Media Work (EMA) of the regional church. The Hanover Regional Church Office (service building Rote Reihe 6) is the seat of the office of the Confederation of Protestant Churches in Lower Saxony. The president is assigned additional staff and specialist offices, such as the specialist office for sexualized violence or the future process #Church 2030.

=== Regional Church Office branches at other locations in Hanover ===
- Goethestraße 27: Hanover Regional Church Archive.
- Knochenhauerstr. 38-40: Audit Office of the Evangelical Lutheran Church of Hanover (Central Seat, Leadership), plus five regional offices (Hannover, Lüneburg, Bremerhaven – Stade, Aurich – Osnabrück, Göttingen – Hildesheim) (directly assigned to the President)
- Rote Reihe: Library of the Regional Church Office of the Evangelical Lutheran Church of Hanover in the Fürstenhof.
- Brandstraße 3: Regional Church Cash Office and staff office in the House of Church Services of the Evangelical Lutheran Church of Hanover.
- Archivstraße 3: Department for Environmental Affairs in the House of Church Services (together with the Church and Environmental Protection working field in the HkD)
- Archivstraße 3: Evangelical Media Work (EMA) in the House of Church Services
- Ebhardtstraße 3: Diakonie of the Evangelical Churches in Lower Saxony (Diakonie department).
- Haarstraße 6: Chancellery of the State Bishop (directly assigned to the Regional Church Office).
- Goseriede 7: School Work of the Evangelical Lutheran Church of Hanover (directly assigned to the Regional Church Office)
- Goethestraße 29: Art Department of the Evangelical Lutheran Church of Hanover (integrated into the Regional Church Office).

=== Other Offices ===
- Offices for Building and Art Conservation of the Evangelical Lutheran Church of Hanover: Nine main and branch offices distributed across the territory of the regional church.
- Detmold, Doktorweg 2: Office of the Supplementary Pension Fund of the Evangelical Lutheran Church of Hanover.

== Leadership of the Regional Church Office as an Administrative Authority ==
The President is remunerated according to the B 7 pay scale, and the Vice Presidents according to B 4. In 2023, it is intended to evaluate the position of the President, the President's position according to B6. The regional church applies the Lower Saxony civil service salary scale.

=== President ===
The Regional Church Office is led as an administrative authority by a lawyer who also heads Department 1. The President is the superior of all employees and responsible for all fundamental matters of the organization of the Regional Church Office as well as for coordinating the departments. He handles fundamental administrative matters and is responsible for the church governing bodies of the regional church as well as for the EKD and VELKD. He is responsible for state and European legal issues. He represents the Regional Church Office and the regional church in public and in ecclesiastical, political, and social committees.

- 1924–1929: Viktor Lampe
- 1930–1933: Max Schramm
- 1933–1946: Friedrich Schnelle
- 1946–1952: Gustav Ahlhorn
- 1952: Ernst-Viktor Benn (1898–1990)
- 1952–1970: Karl Wagenmann
- 1970–1983: Johann Frank
- 1984–2008: Eckhart von Vietinghoff
- 2008–May 2013: Burkhard Guntau
- August 30, 2013-October 2023: Stephanie Springer
- From mid-2024: Jens Lehmann (designate)

Since October 23, 2023, until the new appointment of the President, the office leadership is exercised by the Vice Presidents Ralph Charbonnier and Rainer Mainusch.

=== Vice Presidents ===
The Vice Presidents support the President in the exercise of leadership duties. They coordinate the work of the committees of the Collegium assigned to them. They can be informed about all work processes of the departments assigned to them and reserve the right to their final processing.

==== Spiritual/Theological Vice President ====
The Theological Vice President, until November 2020 Spiritual Vice President, heads Department 2 and the Theology Committee. He is responsible for ecclesiastical/theological fundamental and legal questions, the works and institutions (in principle), the theological faculties and church universities, and for the Landessuperintendentures of the regional church. He wears an official cross.

- 1924–1932: Karl Wagenmann
- 1932–1933: Paul Fleisch
- 1933–1934: Gerhard Hahn
- 1953–1965: Christhard Mahrenholz
- 1965–1969: Friedrich Bartels
- 1969–1984: Hans Philipp Meyer
- 1984–1999: Günter Linnenbrink
- 1999–2001: Hans Schmidt
- 2001–2002: Ernst Kampermann
- 2002–2006: Martin Schindehütte
- 2006–2020: Arend de Vries

==== Legal/Juridical Vice President (incomplete) ====
The Legal Vice President, currently Juridical Vice President, heads Department 7 and the Legal Committee. He is responsible for fundamental legal issues (as of December 2021).

- 1936–1938: Constanz Brüel
- 1938–1952: vacant
- 1953–1958: Constanz Brüel
- 1958–1968: Erich Ruppel
- 1968–1977: Herbert Wiese
- 1977–1993: Werner Knüllig
- 1993–2002: Klaus Grüneklee
- 2002–2021: Rolf Krämer
- since 12/2021: Rainer Mainusch

== Regional Church Office as a Church Governing Body ==
=== Chairman ===
The State Bishop, as chairman of the Regional Church Office, is to be informed about all fundamental matters. He regularly conducts service meetings with the President and the Vice Presidents. He is represented in the Collegium by the President. The State Bishop is remunerated according to the Salary Group B 8 of the Salary Order B.

=== Collegium ===
The State Bishop is the chairman of the Regional Church Office. In addition to the State Bishop, the Collegium includes the President, the Theological and the Juridical Vice Presidents, the spiritual (theological) and legal Senior Church Councillors (OLKR) as ordinary members of the Regional Church Office, and other individuals (lawyers/theologians) as extraordinary members (a.o. Senior Church Councillor/Senior Church Councillor). The members of the Regional Church Office are appointed by the Personnel Committee of the regional church. The Regional Church Office decides as a Collegium and usually meets twice a month. The Collegium is reserved for all matters of fundamental or significant theological, legal, or financial importance, such as drafts of church laws to the Synod, drafts for the budget plan, regulations for the institutions of the regional church. It makes nomination proposals for the election of Superintendents (heads of church districts) and appoints pastors to a general ecclesiastical mission, as far as it is associated with leadership tasks, and sends representatives to ecclesiastical and non-ecclesiastical bodies. The Collegium undertakes supervisory measures according to service or labor law as well as measures according to disciplinary law and the law of teaching objections. In addition to the State Bishop and the President, 7 ordinary members (previously up to 16 ordinary members, plus additional participants) of the Regional Church Office (as of September 2023) belong to the Collegium. The spiritual members wear an official cross. The Personal Assistant to the State Bishop and a representative of the Press Office participate in the meetings. The President may invite additional staff of the Regional Church Office, experts, and guests to the meetings if the Collegium does not object. The Collegium regularly meets with the Regional Bishops (Bishop's Council), until 2019 Superintendents of the regional church, for joint consultations.

==== Members ====
- State Bishop Ralf Meister (chairman)
- Theological Vice President Ralph Charbonnier
- Juridical Vice President Rainer Mainusch
- OLKR'in Kerstin Gäfgen-Track
- OLKR Hans-Joachim Lenke
- OLKR Fabian Spier
- OLKR Adalbert Schmidt
- OLKR'in Nicola Wendebourg

(As of October 2023)

== Miscellaneous ==
Some scenes for the Tatort episode The Last Patient with Maria Furtwängler as Charlotte Lindholm were filmed in the building of the Regional Church Office Hanover. In the film, the Church Office serves as the Youth and Social Office Hanover-Center.
