= Jochen Bohl =

German Lutheran bishop (1950–2026)

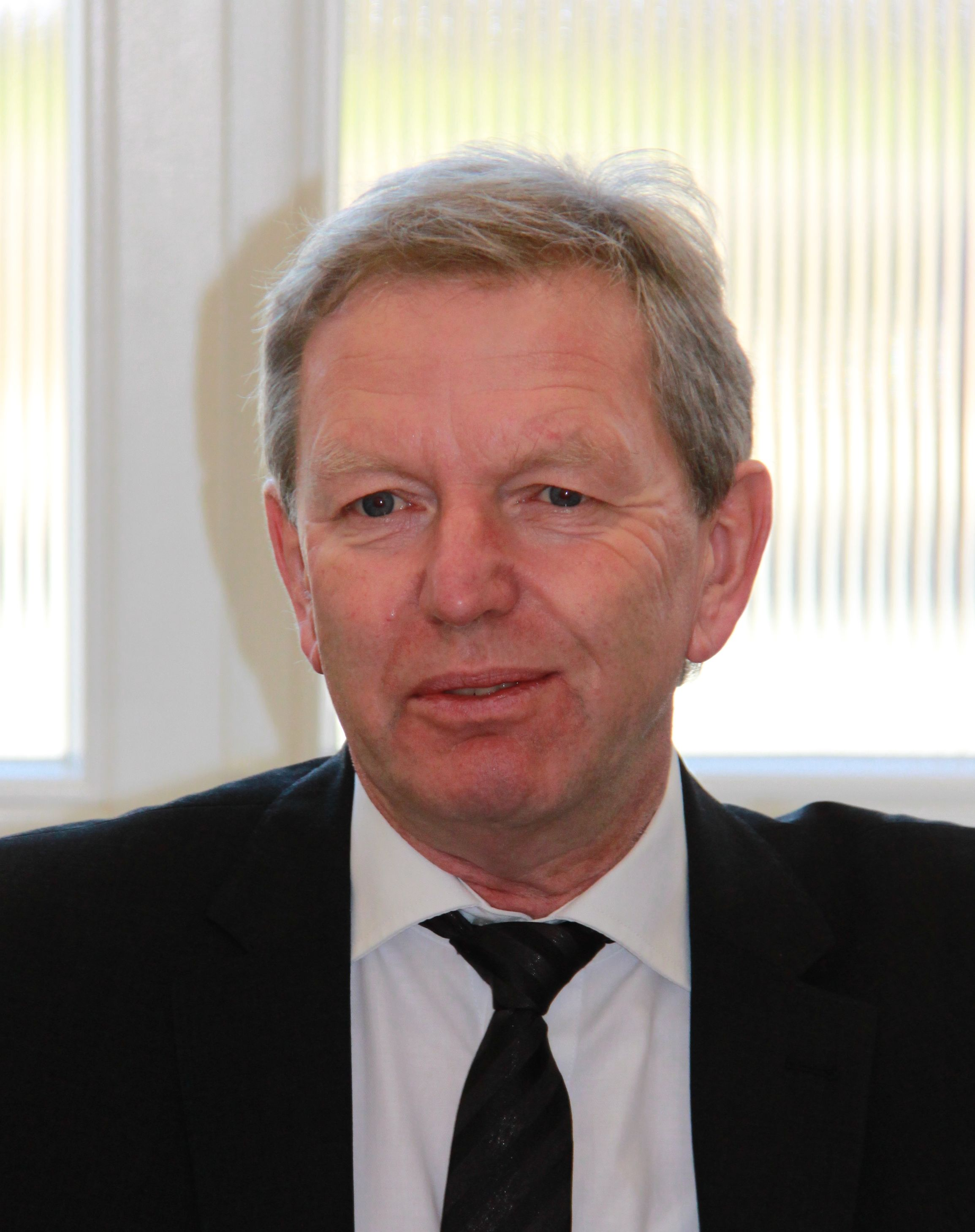
Bohl in 2011

Jochen Bohl (19 April 1950 – 29 July 2026) was the bishop of the Evangelical-Lutheran Church of Saxony having been in office from 2004 to 2015. One of his most memorable moments was the reconsecration of the rebuilt Frauenkirche in Dresden in October 2005. Since 9 November 2010, he was vice president of the council of the Evangelical Church in Germany (EKD). Bohl died on 29 July 2026, at the age of 76.
