= Confederation of Protestant Churches in Lower Saxony =

Christian organization in Germany

The Confederation of Protestant Churches in Lower Saxony is the union of the five regional Protestant churches located in the Lower Saxony. The confederation meets only tasks assigned to it by the national churches. It represents the interests of Protestant regional churches towards the state of Lower Saxony.

== Member churches ==
The Confederation of Protestant Churches in Lower Saxony represents about four million church members (as of 2010) in more than 2,200 communities. It comprises the following regionally delineated national churches, which are all member churches of the Evangelical Church in Germany (EKD):

- Evangelical Lutheran Church in Brunswick
- Evangelical Lutheran Church of Hanover
- Evangelical Lutheran Church in Oldenburg
- Evangelical Reformed Church in Germany
- Evangelical Lutheran Church of Schaumburg-Lippe

=== Facilities ===
The confederation runs common facilities for all member churches, including:

- Rechtshof as a common constitutional and administrative courts
- Labor and employment law committees
- Arbitration and conciliation commissions
- examination Office

Bodies under the auspices of the House of church Offices:

- Protestant village assistants work Niedersachsen (Evangelisches Dorfhelferinnenwerk Niedersachsen (in German))
- Protestant adult education of Lower Saxony (EEB) (Evangelische Erwachsenenbildung Niedersachsen (in German))
- Church service in the police and customs

== Administration ==
The confederation has a council of the Confederacy, in which the presiding Bishops and officials of the regional churches are represented. The confederation has its own synod (church assembly). The Synod will decide on laws and finances of the Confederacy. The management of the Confederacy takes over an office that is housed in the regional church office in Hanover.
