= Hans Meiser =

German theologian (1881–1956)

- Born: 16 February 1881; Nuremberg
- Died: 8 June 1956 (aged 75); Munich, West Germany
- Occupation: Theologian

Hans Meiser (16 February 1881, Nuremberg - 8 June 1956, Munich) was a German Protestant theologian, pastor, and from 1933 to 1955 the first 'Landesbischof' of the Evangelical Lutheran Church in Bavaria.

Today Meiser's political stance between 1933 and 1945 is intensely studied and debated within the parameters of Germany's Culture of Remembrance. In his unsuccessful attempt to maintain his 'landeskirche' and its independence, he decided to make several compromises with the Nazi state. His attitude towards Judaism is also controversial in light of studies of the Shoah.

Theologically, Meiser was in the tradition of Wilhelm Loehe, supporting a single church with a single clear Lutheran confessional identity. Unlike other Bavarian theology professors such as Werner Elert, Paul Althaus and Hermann Sasse, Meiser explicitly recognized the Barmen Theological Declaration and engaged with the links it brought to Unitarians and the Reformed Church. His confessional orientation aligned him with Theophil Wurm and divided him from Martin Niemöller.

== Life ==
In 1933, Hitler sought to centralize his control over Germany's Protestant Churches by establishing a 'Reich Church' which would put all 28 Protestant bishops under the authority of one Reich bishop, answerable to Hitler. Despite the agreement to this plan by the vast majority of Protestant bishops, Bishop Hans Meiser of the Bavarian Diocese, together with Theophil Wurm, a Bishop of the neighboring diocese, refused. Their objection was not due to theological reasons, but was instead an insistence that their churches maintain their traditional independence. Meiser and Wurm did not protest the Nazi regime or Hitler.

Following their refusals, Meiser and Wurm mobilized their congregations in opposition to the Reich Church. Through speaking Meiser was able to produce popular opinion throughout Protestant Bavaria that the regional Nazis could not overturn. For example, "some six thousand gathered in support of Meiser while only a few dutifully showed up at a meeting of the region's party leader, Julius Streicher." This mobilization and the information given to church members increased numbers in protests and protest services. The regional paper accused Bishop Meiser of treason in prominent headlines. In October 1934, Hitler's Reich Bishop (Reichsbischof) Ludwig Müller placed Bishops Meiser and Wurm under house arrest, declared that they were no longer Church officials, and named successors to be bishops in their place. In the two weeks following Meiser's arrest, mass public protest spread into "one of the largest" protests in the Third Reich.

After the Bishops were under house arrest for two weeks, Hitler backed down, released Meiser and Wurm, and restored them as Bishops of their dioceses. In addition, Reich Bishop Müller was removed. These dramatic events illustrated how this protest movement tested the regime and its limits. Compared to brutal backlashes of the regime like the Night of the Long Knives, Hitler chose to appease the Protestant protesters even though, in effect, his hopes for a Reich Church were now negated.

== See also ==
- Gleichschaltung

Titles in Lutheranism
New title	Landesbischof of Bavaria; 1933-1955	Succeeded by Hermann Dietzfelbinger
