= Evangelical-Lutheran Church of Saxony =

Regional Lutheran church body of Saxony, Germany

Coordinates: 51°09′58″N 13°28′17″E

- Evangelisch-Lutherische Landeskirche Sachsens
- Type: Landeskirche, member of the Protestant Church in Germany
- Classification: Protestant
- Landesbischof: Tobias Bilz
- Associations: United Evangelical Lutheran Church of Germany; Protestant Church in Germany; Lutheran World Federation
- Region: 14,900 km^{2} in Saxony
- Headquarters: Dresden
- Origin: 1539
- Congregations: 289
- Members: 557,793; 15.1% of total population (2025)
- Official website: https://www.evlks.de/

The Evangelical-Lutheran Church of Saxony (Evangelisch-Lutherische Landeskirche Sachsens) is one of 20 member Churches of the Protestant Church in Germany (EKD), covering most of the state of Saxony. Its headquarters are in Dresden, and the seat of the bishop (styled Bishop of Saxony) is at Meissen Cathedral. Prior to the propagation of state atheism in the German Democratic Republic (East Germany), it was the largest Evangelical Lutheran church in Germany.

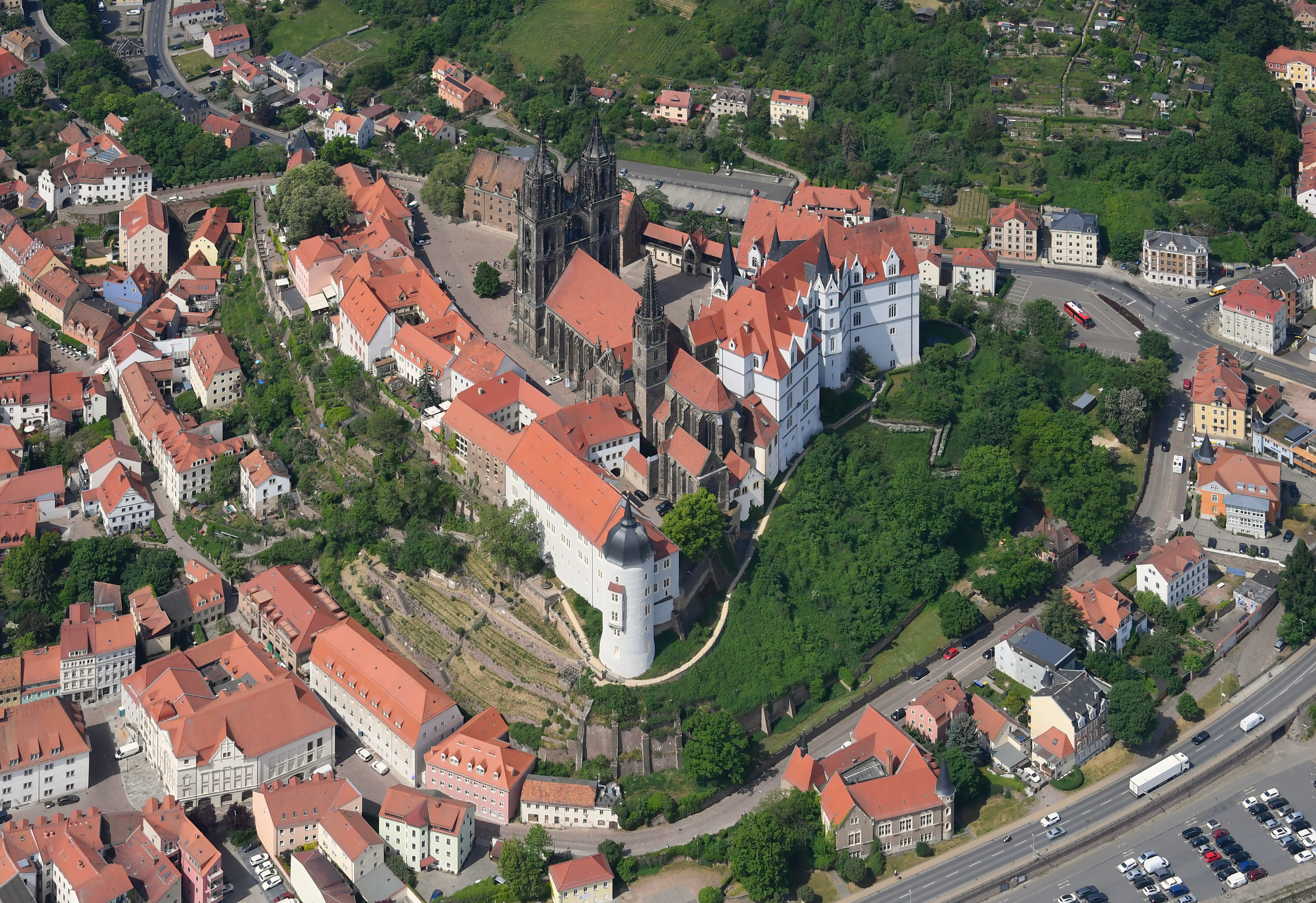
Aerial view of Meissen Cathedral

The church has 557,793 parishioners in 289 parishes (as of December 31, 2025).

== History ==
Historically, the church's organisation became an example for other Protestant churches to be founded throughout Europe, the so-called "Saxon model" of a church as introduced by Martin Luther. It was closely tied to the state, whereby the Elector of Saxony protected the evangelical faith in his jurisdiction. Since the Reformation, the Lutheran orthodoxy (the "purest form" of Lutheranism) prevailed among the general population in Saxony and was secured first by its Ernestine and later Albertine Wettin rulers. Beginning in the 17th century, Pietism also gained a significant following, especially among the working class.

In 2019, Carsten Rentzing, bishop of the church since 2015, resigned his position after controversy arose about his connections to far-right parties and groups.

== Bishops ==
- 1922–1933: Ludwig Heinrich Ihmels
- 1933–1945: Friedrich Otto Coch
- 1945–1947: Franz Lau
- 1947–1953: Hugo Hahn
- 1953–1971: Gottfried Noth
- 1971–1994: Johannes Hempel
- 1994–2004: Volker Kreß
- 2004–2015: Jochen Bohl
- 2015–2019: Carsten Rentzing
- since 2020: Tobias Bilz

== Parishioners ==
- 1922: 4,509,000, the largest Lutheran church in Germany at that time
- 2012: 764,000
- 2013: 754,451
- 2015: 713,648
- 2017: 689,858
- 2018: 677,064
- 2019: 663,525
- 2020: 647,238

== Practices ==
Ordination of women and blessing of same-sex unions were allowed.
