= Otto Mejer =

German canon law specialist

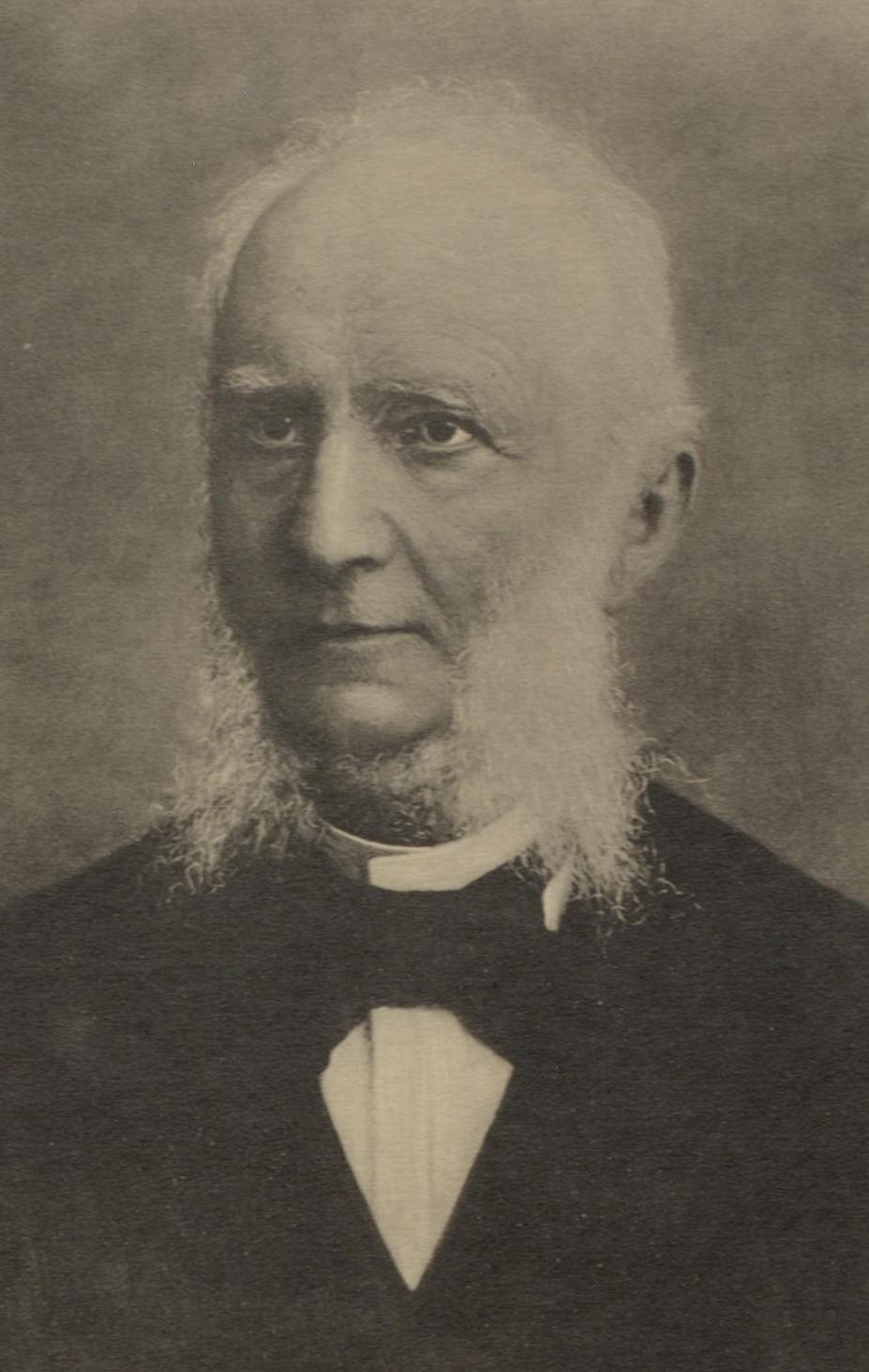
Otto Mejer

Otto Karl Alexander Mejer (27 May 1818, Zellerfeld – 24 December 1893, Hanover) was a German canon law specialist and church historian.

He studied law at the universities of Göttingen, Berlin and Jena, receiving his doctorate at Göttingen in 1841. While a student in Berlin, he was deeply influenced by the teachings of Friedrich Carl von Savigny. Not long after graduation, he became a lecturer at Göttingen, and in 1845/46 took an extended study trip to Rome.

In 1847 he became a full professor of law at the University of Königsberg, which was followed by professorships at Greifswald (1850) and Rostock (1851). In 1874 he returned as a professor to Göttingen, where he taught classes until his retirement in 1883. From 1885 to 1893 he was president of the State Consistory at the Evangelical-Lutheran Church of Hanover, then the highest-ranking office of the church.

== Principal works ==
- Institutionen des gemeinen deutschen Kirchenrechtes, 1845 – Institutions of common German canon law.
- Die Propaganda, ihre Provinzen und ihr Recht. Mit besonderer Rücksicht auf Deutschland (2 volumes), 1853 – Propaganda, provinces and their rights, with a special reference to Germany.
- Eine Erinnerung an Barthold Georg Niebuhr, 1867 – In memorance of Barthold Georg Niebuhr.
- Lehrbuch des deutschen Kirchenrechts (3rd edition, 1869) – Textbook of German canon law.
- Zur Geschichte der römisch-deutschen Frage (3 volumes), 1871-75 – History of the Roman-German question. A description involving the development of legal relations between the state and the Catholic Church within the German states.
- Febronius, Weihbischof Johann Nikolaus von Hontheim und sein Widerruf, 1880 – Johann Nikolaus von Hontheim and his revocation.

He was also the author of 14 articles in the Allgemeine Deutsche Biographie.
