= Loccum =

Village in Lower-Saxony, Germany

Coordinates: 52°27′N 9°09′E

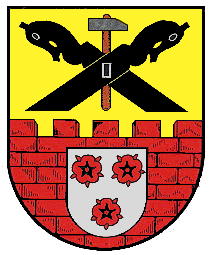
Former coat of arms

Loccum (German pronunciation: [ˈlɔkʊm]) is a village situated about 50 kilometres (31 mi) west-northwest of Hanover in the district of Nienburg in Lower-Saxony, Germany. It has been a part of the city of Rehburg-Loccum since 1974. Loccum covers an area of 32 square kilometres (12 sq mi) with a population of about 3166 people in 2003.

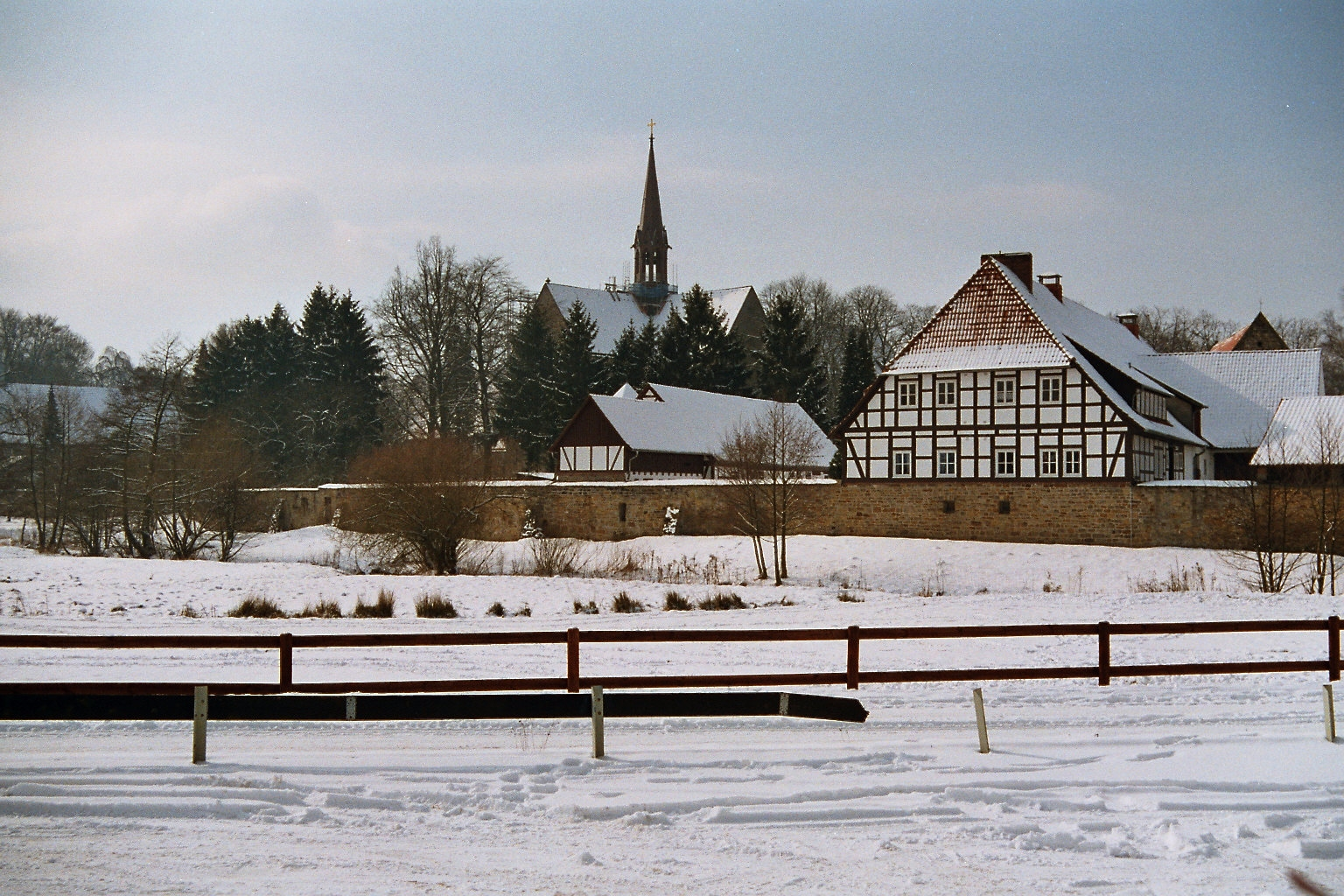
Loccum Abbey

Loccum Abbey was founded in 1163 by Cistercian monks from Volkenroda Abbey in Thuringia, becoming a Lutheran monastery around 1600. It is one of the best preserved buildings of its kind in Germany.

Loccum is home to a Protestant academy for prospective ministers.
