= Summus episcopus =

German sovereigns functioned as summus episcopus (Supreme Bishop) of the Protestant national church; these bishops were created on the principle of cuius regio, eius religio. Similar systems were used in Scandinavia and England. Reformed churches were also tied to the government without having a summus episcopus.

== Holy Roman Empire ==
Within the Holy Roman Empire, princes gained the territorial ecclesiastical governance over time and acted as emergency bishops. By the 19th century, a distinction was made between the Kirchenhoheit (Latin: iura circa sacra), the rights of the government on all religions and denominations, and said "Kirchenregiment" (Latin: iura in sacra), the internal government of the religion and the rights of the territorial lord within his denomination. The Peace of Augsburg suspended the jurisdiction of Catholic bishops over Protestant territories and the Episkopalsystem transferred it to the Protestant Imperial Estates. The Elector of Brandenburg stayed summus episcopus of the Lutherans after his conversion to Calvinism. When Augustus II the Strong converted to catholicism, the Electorate of Saxony remained head of the corpus evangelicorum and the duke remained the head of the Saxon church with his duties being executed by his Lutheran Geheimräte. The King of Bavaria also acted as supreme bishop of the Protestant church of Bavaria despite being Catholic. Their tasks included calling in colloquia and synods to ensure "the purity of the teachings" and appoint pastors and teachers. "Bishops" and "arch-bishops" appointed by the Prussian king were nominal titles with the king keeping his authority over the church. Eventually, most responsibilities to govern the Landeskirchen were transferred to consistories. These were abolished with in 1918 after the collapse of the German Empire. The Landesbischof took over the leadership of the regional churches.

== Other Lutheran denominations ==
The King of Sweden was called summus episcopus of the Swedish and Finnish Churches. According to the 1809 Instrument of Government of Sweden, the King of Sweden appoints and promote the civil servants which include spiritual positions. The new constitution of 1974, reduced the role of the king with the Government of Sweden taking much its formal role including in regards to the Church of Sweden. In 2000, the church was officially separated from the state. The King of Norway was the head of the Church of Norway until 2012. After the amendment in 2012, the only provision remained, is the mandatory membership for the king. The Church of Denmark kept the Danish king as its figurehead. Since 1992, it has been optional for pastors to mention the royal family in prayers.

After the Great Northern War, Swedish Estonia, Ingria and Livonia came under Russian rule but the Swedish church constitution remained in force. The (Orthodox) Russian czar was represented by the Baltic knighthoods as summus episcopus. In 1832, Nicholas I of Russia created the Evangelical Lutheran Church in Russia, modeled after Western churches, which was headed by the Russian czar as summus episcopus. The church united all protestants including the Calvinists within the Russian Empire (excluding Finland and Poland). The president and General Superintendent of the Evangelical-Lutheran General-Consistory were appointed by the tsar.

== Anglican Communion ==
King Henry VIII became Supreme Head of the Church of England with the passing of the Act of Supremacy 1534. The Church of Ireland followed suit in 1537 with another Act of Supremacy. The position was abolished with the Second Statute of Repeal in 1555. The Act of Supremacy 1558 introduced the new title Supreme Governor. The king has to be Protestant since the Act of Settlement 1701. The Acts of Union 1707 secured the status of the Church of Scotland as a Presbyterian (Reformed) church and declared that the King of the United Kingdom is required to preserve and protect the kirk without being its supreme governor.

The German "summus episcopus" is sometimes translated as "Supreme Governor", in other contexts "supreme governor" is described as a weaker form.

== See also ==
- Caesaropapism
- Magisterial Reformation
