= Evangelical Lutheran Church in Brunswick =

Member of the Protestant Church in Germany

The Evangelical Lutheran Church in Brunswick (German: Evangelisch-Lutherische Landeskirche in Braunschweig) is a Lutheran church in the German states of Lower Saxony and Saxony-Anhalt.

Evangelical Lutheran Church in Brunswick

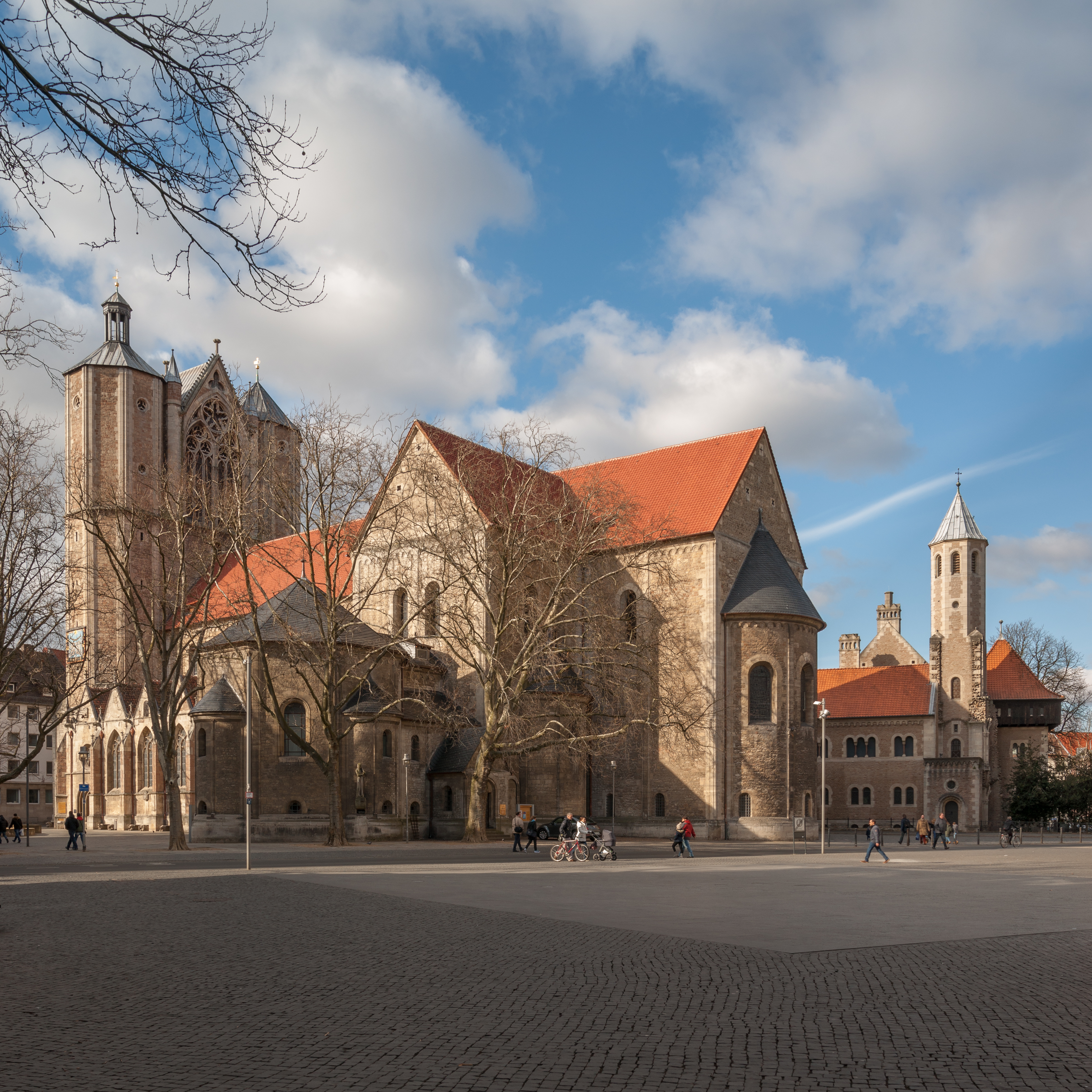
Brunswick cathedral

The seat of the Landesbischof (bishop) is Wolfenbüttel. Its district as a Landeskirche covers the former Free State of Brunswick in the borders of 1945. As of 2025, the church had 264,300 members in 239 parishes. It is a full member of the Protestant Church in Germany (EKD), and is based on the teachings brought forward by Martin Luther during the Reformation. It is also a member of the United Evangelical Lutheran Church of Germany, the Community of Protestant Churches in Europe, the Lutheran World Federation, and the World Council of Churches. It is linked with the Church of England Diocese of Blackburn. Leading bishop of the church is Christoph Meyns (since 2014). The Church of Brunswick owns about 480 churches; the most famous of these is Brunswick Cathedral.

== History ==
The Church of Brunswick originated as the state church (German: Landeskirche) of the Principality of Brunswick-Wolfenbüttel, where the Protestant Reformation was ultimately introduced in 1568. The ruling duke acted as bishop of the church. In 1704, Wolfenbüttel introduced religious tolerance, so that parishes not belonging to the state church could be founded. After the monarchy was abolished in 1918, the Church of Brunswick became an independent organization, but retained — like all former state churches — certain privileges. In 1922, the Brunswickian church counted 464,000 parishioners.

== Practices ==
Ordination of women and blessing of same-sex marriages are allowed.

== Bishops ==
- 1923–1933 Alexander Bernewitz
- 1933–1934 Wilhelm Beye (1903–1975)
- 1934 Oskar Evers (1889–1961)
- 1934–1947 Helmuth Johnsen
- 1947–1965 Martin Erdmann
- 1965–1982 Gerhard Heintze
- 1982–1994 Gerhard Müller
- 1994–2002 Christian Krause
- 2002–May 2014 Friedrich Weber
- 2014-May 2026 Christoph Meyns
- since May 2026 Christina-Maria Bammel

== Mission ==
The Evangelical-Lutheran Mission in Lower Saxony (ELM), which was founded in 1977 as a common organisation for the Evangelical Lutheran State Churches of Brunswick, Hanover and Schaumburg-Lippe, looks after relationships with the overseas partner churches of the Brunswick State Church. The headquarters of the ELM is in Hermannsburg in the Südheide. Since 2003, Pastor Martina Helmer-Pham Xuan has been the director of the mission.
