= Loccum Abbey =

Lutheran monastery near Lake Steinhude, Lower Saxony, Germany

Coordinates: 52°27′07″N 9°09′02″E

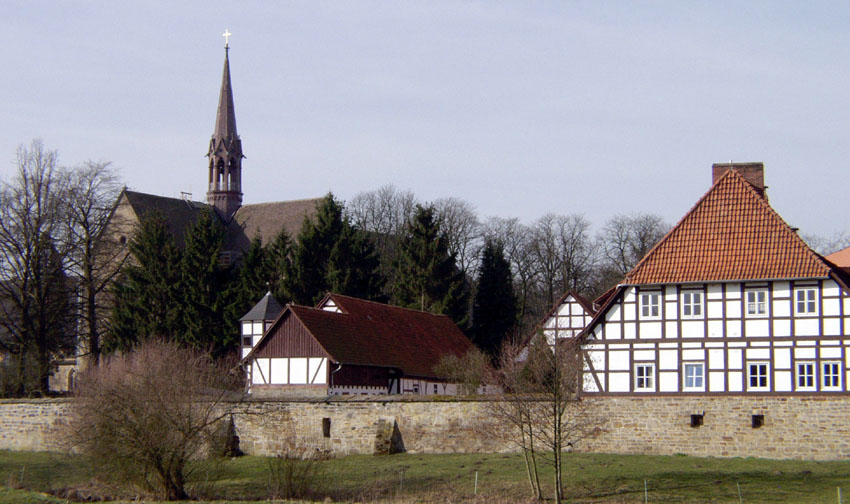
View of Loccum Abbey

Loccum Abbey (German: Kloster Loccum) is a Lutheran monastery in the Cistercian tradition, located in the town of Rehburg-Loccum, near Lake Steinhude, Lower Saxony, Germany.

== History ==
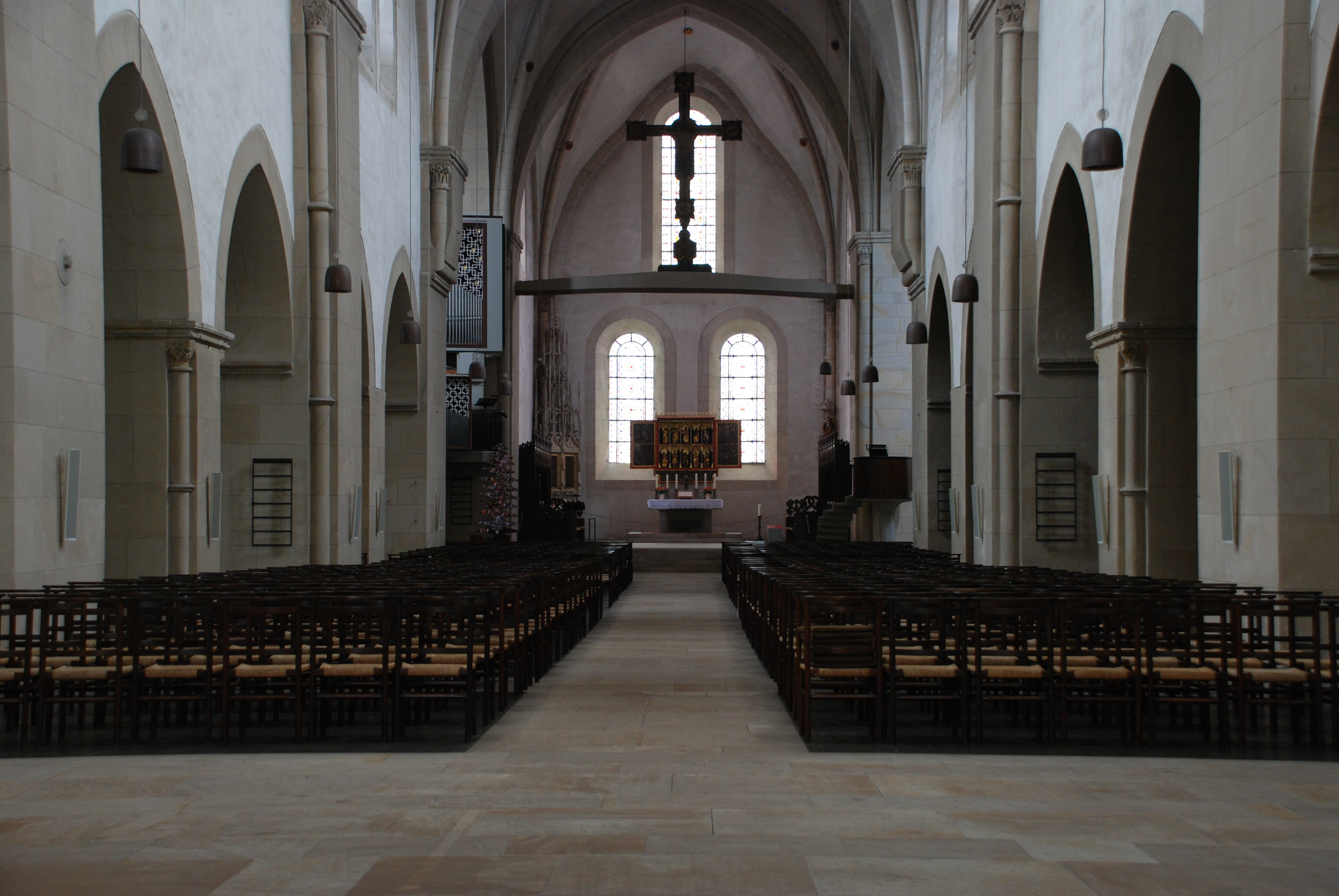
Interior of the abbey church

Founded as a Roman Catholic monastery run by the Cistercians, Loccum Abbey originated as a foundation of Count Wilbrand of Hallermund, and was settled from Volkenroda Abbey under the first abbot, Ekkehard, in 1163. An ancient account describes it as being "in a place of horror and a desert of solitude and a dwelling of thieves and brigands" (Latin: in loco horroris et vastæ solitudinis et prædonum et latronum commorationis); (Note: Quoted in the Catholic Encyclopedia without a reference.) and adds that, after suffering much from want and from the barbarity of their neighbours, the monks in time brought the land into cultivation, and the people to the fear of God. Loccum very quickly grew wealthy and was under the direct protection of the Pope and the Emperor as an Imperial abbey (i.e., territorially independent).

In the 16th century in Protestant Reformation it became Lutheran. By 1700 the abbot of Loccum was permitted to marry and the Loccum Hof was built at Hanover to accommodate his spouse. The monastery retained its property and wealth until the agrarian reforms of the 19th century, when it was included in the territory of the Duchy of Braunschweig-Lüneburg, otherwise Hanover.

Since 1891 the monastery has also operated as a Protestant seminary and academy, a tradition going back to around the start of the 19th century. The title of abbot is retained, anomalously.

== Modern community ==
The community today generally consists of between four and eight members, most of whom are also in holy orders. In addition the Lutheran Bishop of Hanover and the Director of Studies of the seminary are members ex officio. The abbot and prior are chosen from among the members.

== Buildings ==
The abbey is known for its extremely well preserved monastic buildings from the late Romanesque period with church, cloister and associated rooms, chapter-house, sacristy, dormitory, refectory, library, lay-brothers' wing, as well as the various service buildings. The buildings as a whole are considered of equal architectural worth with Maulbronn Abbey and Bebenhausen Abbey. The monastery's ponds and woods also throw an interesting light on the abbey's medieval economy.

Construction of the abbey church of Saints Mary and George – now St. George's parish church – was completed around 1250.

== Recent abbots ==
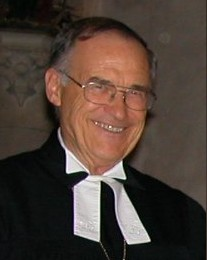
Horst Hirschler, retired bishop and abbot of Loccum Abbey

- Gerhard Wolter Molanus (1677–1722)
- Just Christopherus Böhmer (1722–1732)
- Georg Wilhelm Ebell (1732–1770)
- Christoph Heinrich Chappuzeau (1770–1791)
- Johann Christoph Salfeld (1791–1829)
- August Ludwig Hoppenstedt (1830), vacant till 1832
- Friedrich Rupstein (1832–1876)
- Gerhard Uhlhorn (1878–1901)
- Georg Hartwig (1902–1927)
- August Marahrens (1928–1950)
- Johannes Lilje (1950–1977)
- Eduard Lohse (1977–2000)
- Horst Hirschler (since 2000)

== Burials ==
- Valdemar of Denmark (bishop)

== General references ==
- Hirschler, Horst; Berneburg, Ernst, eds. (1980). Geschichten aus dem Kloster Loccum. Studien, Bilder, Dokumente (in German). Hanover: Lutherhaus Verlag. ISBN 3875021401. OCLC 720748885.
- Siegmund, Johannes Jürgen (2003). "2001 dissertation at Kirchliche Hochschule in Neuendettelsau". Bischof Johannes Lilje, Abt zu Loccum. Eine Biographie (in German). Göttingen: Vandenhoeck & Ruprecht. ISBN 3525554478. OCLC 612540965.
