= Superintendent (Christianity) =

Head of an administrative division of a Protestant church

Superintendent is the title given to a person who is a leader of a Christian denomination at the regional or national level in some Protestant denominations. They usually perform the function of an elected bishop, but are constrained by synodical governance and do not claim episcopal apostolic succession in a sacramental sense, but mearly ministerial apostolic succession.

== Lutheran usage ==
This title has been used in Lutheranism since 1527 for pastors leading a denomination at the regional level. The office was similar to that of bishop, but instead of being ordained by the archbishop, the superintendent was appointed by the Crown. This new model of ecclesiastical polity was partly political, as the Roman Catholic bishops before the Reformation held considerable political power and often used it against the king who was the summus episcopus. Superintendents' loyalty was supposed to lie with the head of the church, the monarch. Before 1918, some churches used even the title Generalsuperintendent in favour of bishop. In modern times some German Lutheran churches dismissed the title and returned to more ecclesiastical titles like Dean or regional bishop.

== Reformed usage ==
The Presbyterian Church of Scotland's First Book of Discipline of 1560 provided for Scotland to be divided into ten dioceses with superintendents.

All Hungarian Reformed churches in Europe organise life into districts led by elected bishops (püspök).

== Methodist usage ==
The term superintendent is used for several varying positions in Methodism worldwide since 1784. In the American sense, specifically within the United Methodist Church, the title is used not to refer to a minister who is equivalent to a bishop but to the supervisor of a district, which is a regional subdivision below an episcopal area (equivalent to a diocese). According to the Book of Discipline of the United Methodist Church,

The offices of bishop and district superintendent exist in The United Methodist Church as particular ministries. Bishops are elected and district superintendents are appointed from the group of elders who are ordained to be ministers of Word, Sacrament, and Order and thereby participate in the ministry of Christ, in sharing a royal priesthood which has apostolic roots (I Peter 2:9; John 21:15-17; Acts 20:28; I Peter 5:2-3; I Timothy 3:1-7).

In the British Methodist Church and its offshoots, a superintendent (sometimes shortened to "super") is a minister who serves in a supervisory position over a Methodist circuit (a grouping of local churches to which ministers are appointed).

The role of superintendent evolved in Britain before the death of Methodist founder John Wesley and was a description of the responsibilities of some of his assistants (a role which later evolved into what is now known as ordained presbyteral ministry).

== Pentecostal usage ==
In some Pentecostal denominations, the title is used, such as Assemblies of God since 1914, regionally and nationally.
