= Evangelical Lutheran Church of Schaumburg-Lippe =

Lutheran Christian church in Germany

The Evangelical Lutheran Church of Schaumburg-Lippe (German: Evangelisch-Lutherische Landeskirche Schaumburg-Lippe) is a Lutheran member church (Landeskirche) of the Protestant Church in Germany. It covers the former principality of Schaumburg-Lippe and seated in Bückeburg.

Evangelical Lutheran Church of Schaumburg-Lippe

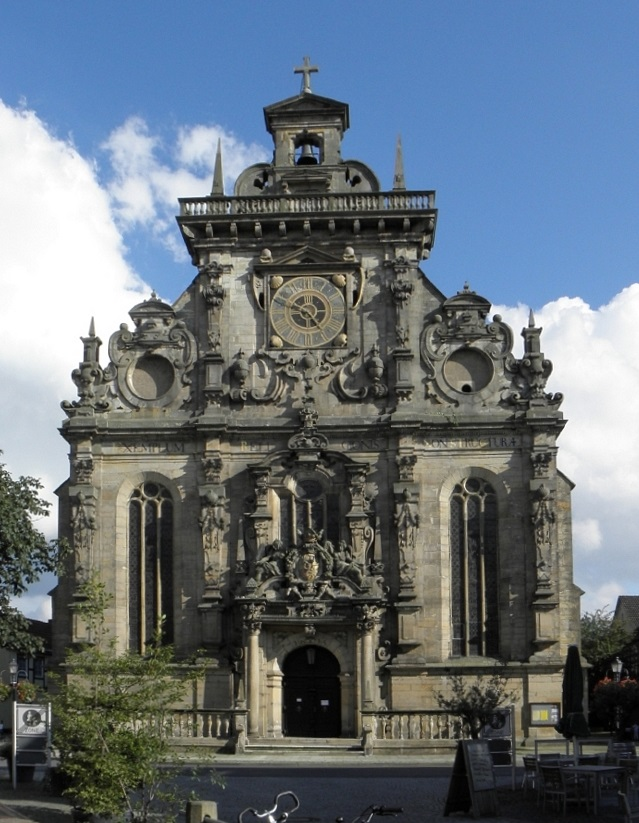
Church Bückeburg

The church has 41,946 members and is one of the smallest regional Protestant churches in Germany. The church is one of the members of the United Evangelical Lutheran Church of Germany (VELKD) and of the Confederation of Protestant Churches in Lower Saxony. The ordination of women and blessing of same-sex marriages has been allowed.

== Bishops ==
- 1949–1966: Wilhelm Henke
- 1966–1979: Johann Gottfried Maltusch
- 1979–1991: Joachim Heubach
- 1991–2001: Heinrich Herrmanns
- 2001–2009: Jürgen Johannesdotter
- 2009–2024: Karl-Hinrich Manzke
- since 2024: Oliver Schuegraf
