= Landesbischof =

Head of some churches in Germany

A Landesbischof (German: [ˈlandəsˌbɪʃɔf]) is the head of some Protestant regional churches in Germany. Based on the principle of summus episcopus (German: landesherrliches Kirchenregiment), after the Reformation each Lutheran prince assumed the position of supreme governor of the state church in his territory. After the First World War, all the German monarchies were abolished and in some regional churches a member of the clergy was elected as Landesbischof.

Regional churches not using the term Landesbischof for their chairpersons, and often also allowing laypersons to take that office, use titles such as bishop (Bischof, only clergy), church president (Kirchenpräsident), praeses (Präses), state superintendent (Landessuperintendent, only clergy) or secretary (Schriftführer).

== Churches with chairpersons titled Landesbischof ==
- Protestant Church in Baden, title used since 1933
- Evangelical Lutheran Church in Bavaria, title used since 1933
- Evangelical Lutheran State Church in Brunswick, title used since 1923
- Evangelical Lutheran State Church of Eutin (1921–1976, merged in the NEK), title used since 1961
- Evangelical Lutheran Church in the Hamburg State (1529–1976, merged in the NEK), title used since 1933
- Evangelical-Lutheran State Church of Hanover, title used since 1925
- Evangelical Lutheran Church in the Lübeck State (merged in the NEK in 1976), title used since 1934
- Evangelical Lutheran State Church of Mecklenburg (ELLM) (1933–2012, merged in the Evangelical Lutheran Church in Northern Germany), title used since 1933
- Evangelical Lutheran State Church of Mecklenburg-Schwerin (1850–1933, merged in the ELLM), title used since 1921
- Mecklenburg-Strelitz State Church (merged in the ELLM in 1933), title used since 1921
- Evangelical State Church in Nassau (1817–1934/1947, merged in the Protestant Church in Hesse and Nassau), title used from 1827 to 1882, and again from 1922 to 1934
- Evangelical Church in Middle Germany (EKM), title used since 2009
- Evangelical Lutheran Church in Northern Germany, Landesbischof since 2013
- Evangelical Church of the (old-Prussian) Union (1817–2003), title used between 1933 and 1935
- Evangelical Lutheran State Church of Saxony, title used since 1922
- Evangelical Lutheran State Church of Schaumburg-Lippe, title used since 1949
- Evangelical Lutheran State Church of Schleswig-Holstein (1866–1976; merged in the NEK), title used between 1933 and 1945
- Evangelical Lutheran Church in Thuringia (1920–2008; merged in the EKM), title used since 1933
- Evangelical State Church in Württemberg, title used since 1934

== Churches with chairpersons titled Bischof ==
- Evangelical Church in Berlin, Brandenburg and Silesian Upper Lusatia
- Evangelical Church of Kurhessen-Waldeck
- Evangelical Lutheran Church in Oldenburg

== Churches with chairpersons titled church president (Kirchenpräsident) ==
- Protestant Church in Hesse and Nassau
- Protestant Church of Anhalt
- Protestant Church of Palatinate
- Evangelical Reformed Church in Germany

== Churches with chairpersons titled Präses ==
- Evangelical Church in the Rhineland
- Evangelical Church of Westphalia

== Churches with chairpersons titled Schriftführer ==
- Evangelical Church of Bremen

== Churches with chairpersons titled Landessuperintendent ==
- Church of Lippe
