= List of churches in Hamburg =

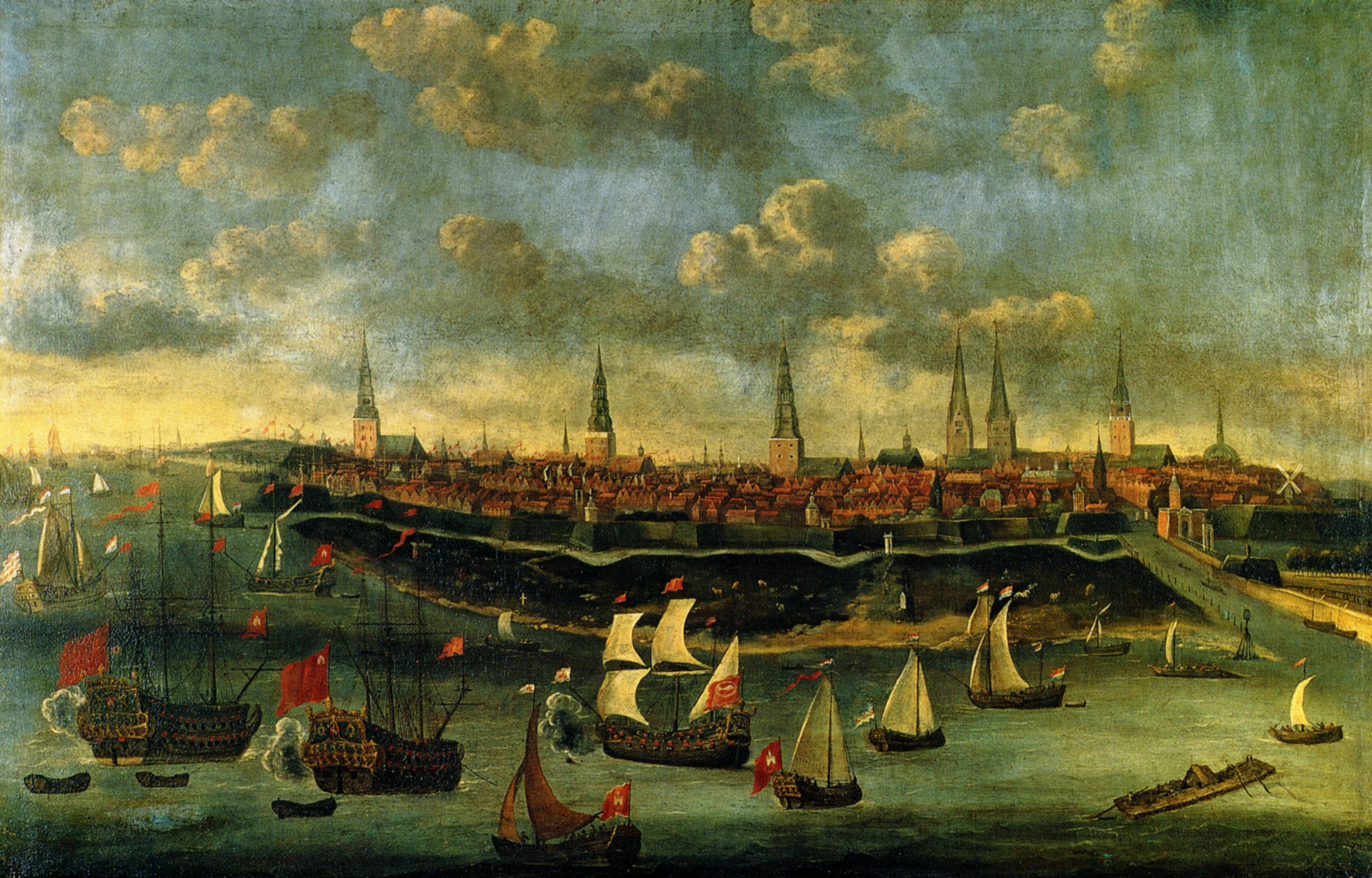
Elias Galli (1650–1714), View of Hamburg or Stadtansicht von Hamburg, circa 1680, oil on canvas, Hamburg Museum, Hamburg

This is a list of churches in the Free and Hanseatic City of Hamburg. There are many famous local churches in and around Hamburg. The St. Michaelis church is a famous Hamburg landmark, St. Nikolai church was the tallest building in the world in the 1870s and remains the second tallest structure in Hamburg.

== List ==
Legend

- Lutheran church
- Catholic Church

Name	German name	Year ^{[A]}	Location^{[B]}	Image	Notes
St. Peter's Church	Hauptkirche St. Petri; Petrikirche	1195; 1418 (rebuild); 1842 (fire)	Mönckebergstraße, Altstadt	Petrikirche	Gothic-style building
St. Catherine's Church	Hauptkirche Sankt Katharinen	1256; 16th century (rebuild)	Altstadt	In 2004	
St. James's Church	Hauptkirche Sankt Jacobi	1255; 1963 (rebuild)	Altstadt		
St Mary's Church	Kirchengemeinde St. Marien	1960	Fuhlsbüttel		
St. Matthew's Church	Matthäuskirche	1919			
St. Michaelis Church	Hauptkirche Sankt Michaelis; Michel	1647; 1750 (fire)	Neustadt		
St. Nikolai	Hauptkirche St. Nikolai	1874; 1943 (fire)	Altstadt		world's tallest building from 1874 to 1876. ruins since 1940s
	Sankt Nikolai	1951	Harvestehude		Replaced old St. Nikolai
	Thomaskirche		Hausbruch	A church	
	Auferstehungskirche		Lohbruegge	A modern church	
	Tonndorfer Kirche		Tonndorf	A church	
	Herz Jesu Kirche		Hamm	A church	
	Sankt Erich Kirche		Rothenburgsort	A church	
	Paul-Gerhardt-Kirche		Bahrenfeld	A modern church	
	Kirche der Stille		Altona	A church	
	Martinskirche		Rahlstedt	A church	
Church of Saint John of Kronstadt	Kirche des Hl. Johannes von Kronstadt, formerly Gnadenkirche		St. Pauli	A church	Gemeinde des Hl. Johannes von Kronstadt, Russian Orthodox church, former Lutheran church
	St. Maria Magdalena Kirche		Moorburg	A church	
	St. Nicolai		Altengamme	A church	
	Russische Kirche des heiligen Prokop			A church	Russian Orthodox church
	Neuer Mariendom, former Pfarrkirche St. Marien		St. Georg	A red brick building, with two towers	

1. Construction date or first mentioned on record., secondary dates are major events including fires and reconstruction but not additions.
2. Borough or quarter of current political location.

== See also ==
- List of museums and cultural institutions in Hamburg
- List of castles in Hamburg
