= Hauptkirche =

Hauptkirche (German for "Main Church") may refer to five churches in the city of Hamburg:

- St. Michael's Church, Hamburg
- St. Nicholas' Church, Hamburg
- St. Peter's Church, Hamburg
- St. James' Church, Hamburg
- St. Catherine's Church, Hamburg
