= Fuhlsbüttel station =

Railway station in Hamburg, Germany

Coordinates: 53.6325°N 10.0264°E

Fuhlsbüttel
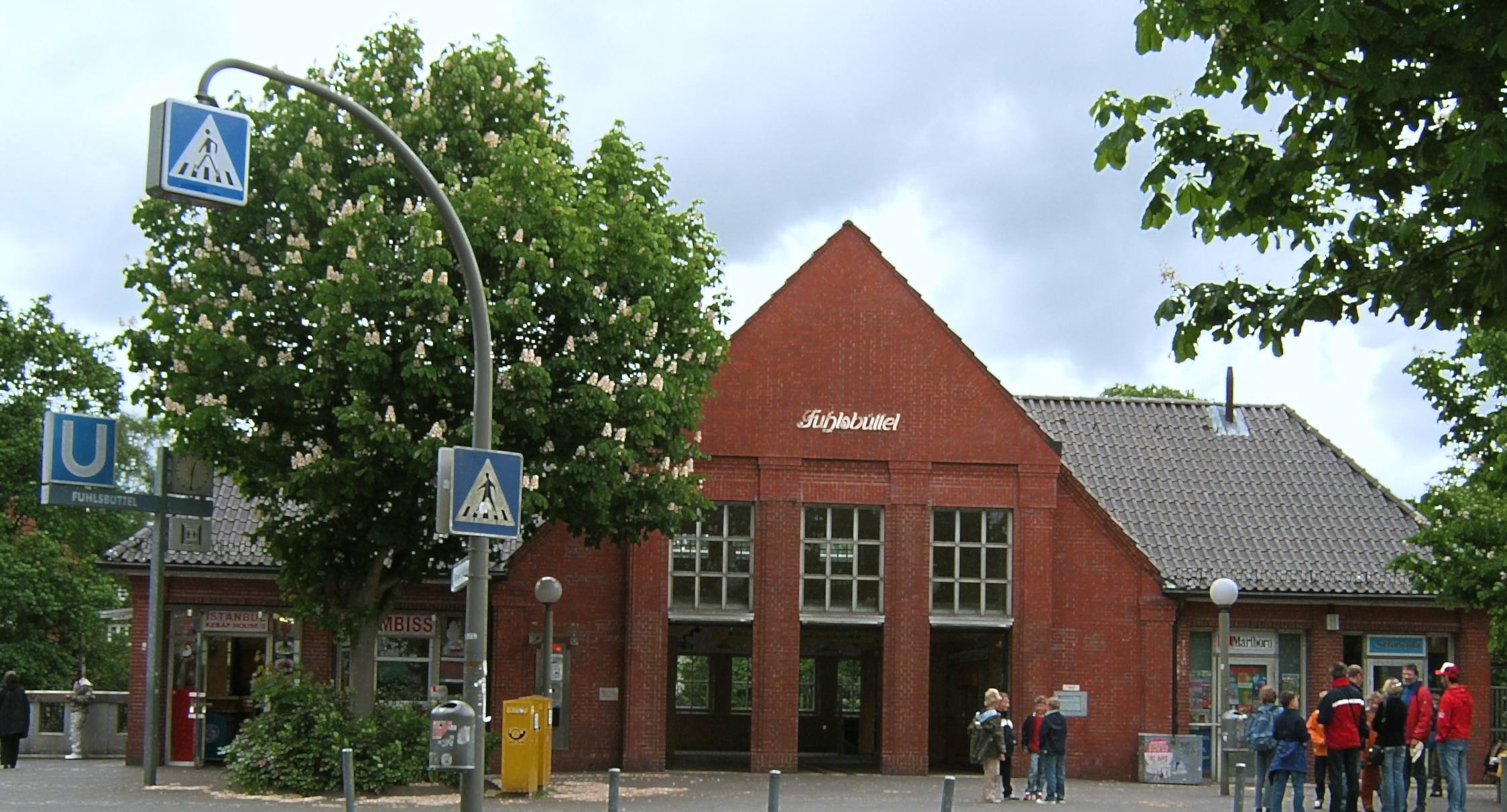

General information
- Location: Kleekamp; 22339 Hamburg, Germany
- System: Hamburg U-Bahn station
- Operator: Hamburger Hochbahn AG
- Line: U1
- Platforms: 1 island platform
- Tracks: 2
- Connections: Bus

Construction
- Structure type: Terrain cutting
- Accessible: Yes

Other information
- Station code: HHA: FU
- Fare zone: HVV: A/203 and 204

History
- Opened: 1 July 1921

Services
Preceding station	Hamburg U-Bahn	Following station
Fuhlsbüttel Nord towards Norderstedt Mitte	U1	Klein Borstel towards Großhansdorf or Ohlstedt
Location

Fuhlsbüttel is a station on the Hamburg U-Bahn line U1. It was opened in July 1921 and is located in Hamburg, Germany, in the quarter of Fuhlsbüttel. Fuhlsbüttel is part of the borough of Hamburg-Nord.

== History ==
The station was opened in July 1921, after the Langenhorn railway was in preliminary operation with steam trains since 5 January 1918. The steam trains then used the track of the freight railway from Ohlsdorf to Ochsenzoll, which was located east of the U-Bahn tracks. It was used until 1991 and removed in 2008. In 1990 the station was fully renovated, and a lift was added then.

== Station layout ==
The station is located in a terrain cutting with an island platform and two tracks. The station is fully accessible for handicapped persons, as there is a lift.

== Service ==
=== Trains ===
Fuhlsbüttel is served by Hamburg U-Bahn line U1; departures are every 5 minutes, every 10 minutes in non-busy periods. Bus lines 118, 174, and night bus line 607 have a stop in front of the station.

== See also ==
- List of Hamburg U-Bahn stations
