= St. Michael's Church, Hamburg =

Lutheran church in Hamburg, Germany

St. Michael's Church Hauptkirche St. Michaelis Michel
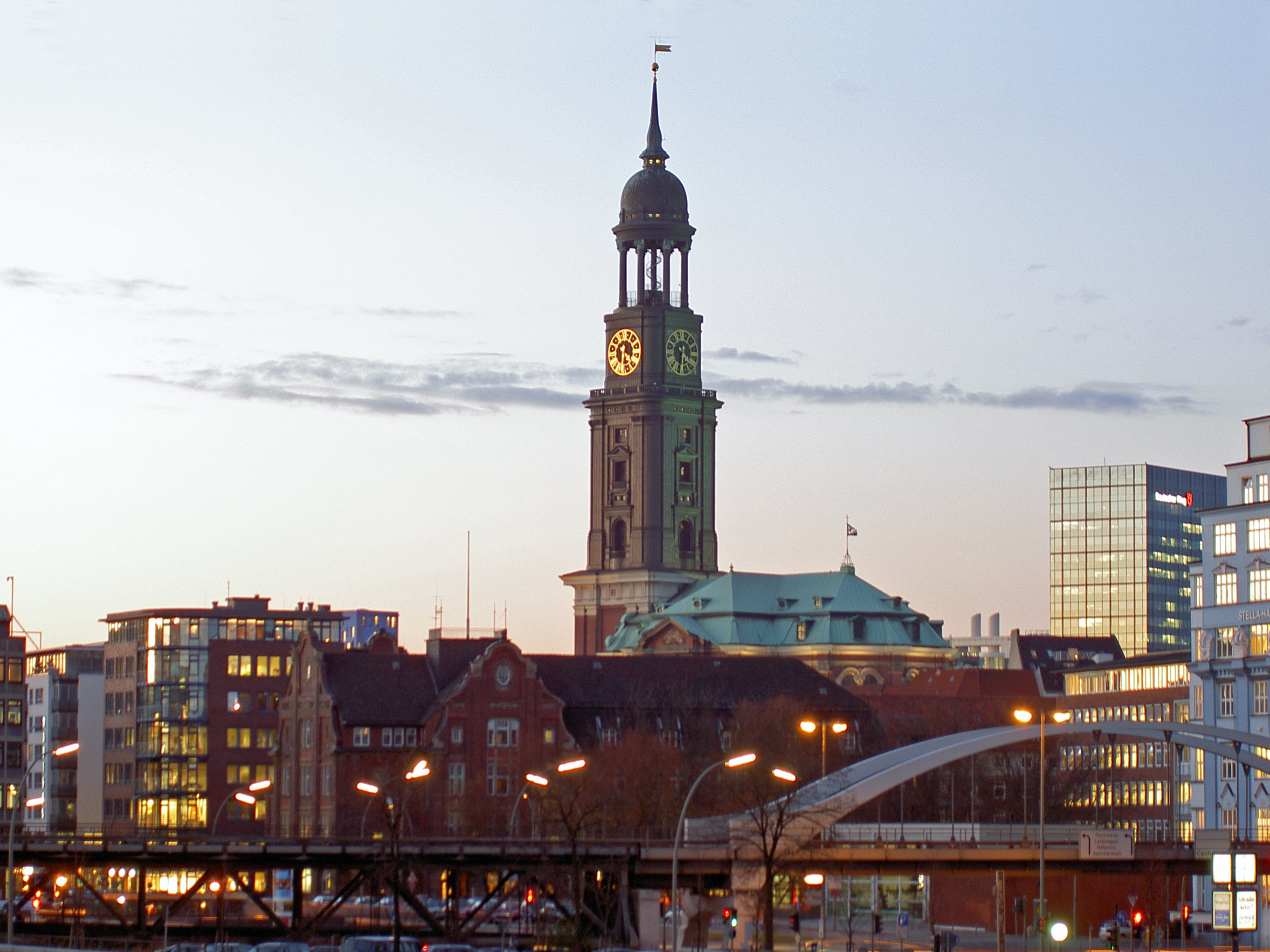
- View of St. Michael's from the Port of Hamburg

- Location within Hamburg Location within Germany

Religion
- Affiliation: Evangelical Lutheran Church in Northern Germany
- Ecclesiastical or organisational status: Hauptkirche

Location
- Location: Quarter of Neustadt, Hamburg, Germany
- Coordinates: 53°32′54″N 9°58′44″E

Architecture
- Style: Baroque
- Completed: 1669/1786/1912
- Height (max): 132 m

Website
- www.st-michaelis.de

St. Michael's Church (German: Hauptkirche Sankt Michaelis), colloquially called Michel (German: [ˈmɪçl̩]), is one of Hamburg's five Lutheran main churches (Hauptkirchen) and one of the most famous churches in the city. St. Michael is a landmark of the city and is considered one of the most important Protestant Baroque churches in northern Germany. The church was purpose-built as a Protestant church, unlike many other Hamburg churches that were originally built by Roman Catholics and converted to Protestantism during the Reformation. It is dedicated to the Archangel Michael. A large bronze statue above the church's main portal shows the archangel conquering the devil.

The 132-metre-high Baroque spire, covered with copper, is a prominent feature of Hamburg's skyline and has long served as a landfall mark for ships sailing up the river Elbe.

== History ==
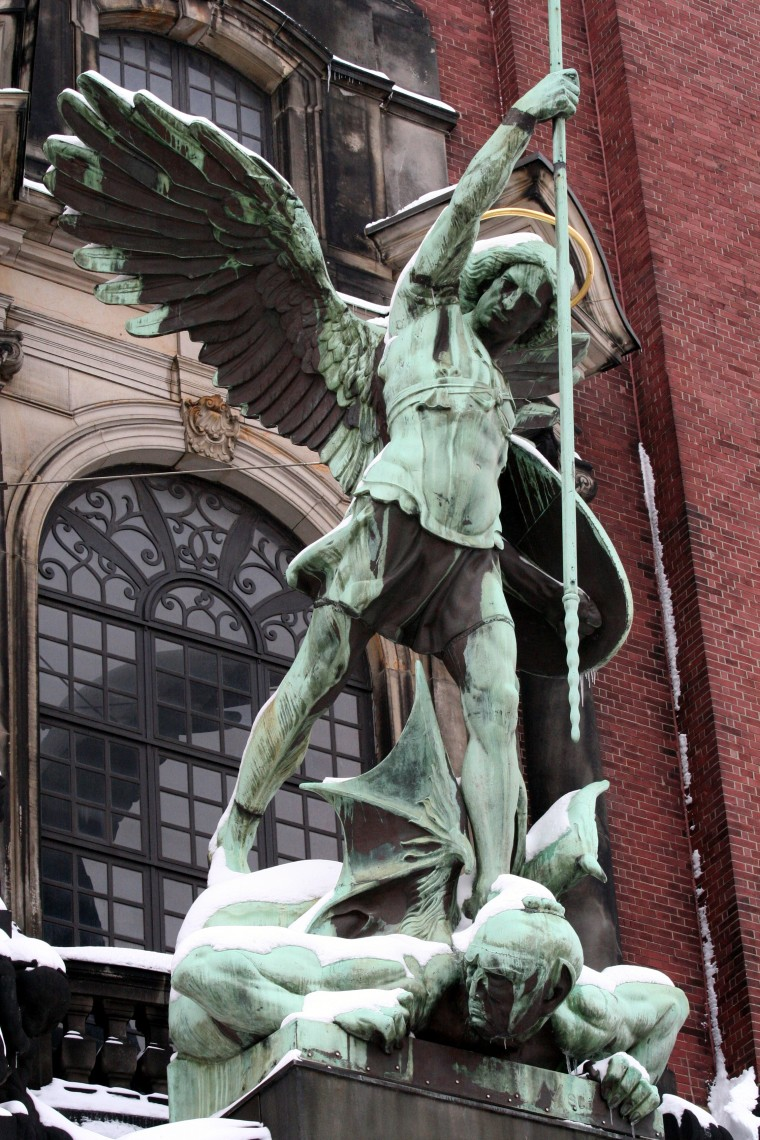
St. Michael's Victory over the Devil, sculpture above the main entrance

St. Michael's history began around 1600 with a cemetery chapel near the site of the present Kleiner Michel, outside Hamburg's walls. It soon became too small, and in good weather people in the churchyard listened to sermons through the open windows.

The present church building is the third one at this site. The first one was built from 1647 to 1669. It was consecrated in 1661, before it had a tower. Christoph Corbinus directed the work at first; Peter Marquard took over after his death. It became the church of the new town (Neustadt), which was created in 1625 inside the new city walls and grew steadily thereafter. In 1685, the Michel became the fifth main church (Hauptkirche), as the new town (Neustadt) became a parish. That church was destroyed on March 10, 1750, by a lightning strike. The fire went unnoticed for about two hours, and rebuilding plans began the following day.

In 1751, the foundation stone for the second church was laid. Construction was interrupted for three years from 1753 amid disputes over the roof. In 1762, the new building, designed by Johann Leonhard Prey and Ernst Georg Sonnin, was inaugurated with an oratorio by Georg Philipp Telemann, who had served as the city's musical director since 1721, overseeing music at its five major Protestant Lutheran churches. Prey had died in 1757, leaving Sonnin in sole charge of the project. The consecration took place on October 19, while the tower remained unfinished. After the church board complained about the missing tower in 1776, Sonnin was appointed to complete it. It was not until 1786 that this new building was completed with the construction of the tower. This design largely established the church's present form.

In 1802, the astronomer Johann Benzenberg attempted to confirm Earth's rotation by dropping metal balls inside the church tower and measuring their eastward deviation from the vertical. The 76.3 m drops produced an average eastward displacement of 8.7 mm. The experiment preceded Foucault's pendulum demonstration by about fifty years.

During the French occupation of Hamburg from 1806 to 1814, St. Michael's was not converted into a military stable like other main churches. Twelve parishioners provided space for the 500 horses assigned to it.

The composer and pianist Johannes Brahms was baptized on May 26, 1833, in this church and confirmed at the age of fifteen by Pastor von Ahlsen, who had married Brahms's parents. He had been born earlier that month in Hamburg's Gängeviertel.

On July 3, 1906, a fire broke out in the tower during soldering work on damaged copper plates: tar gas produced during the work ignited the wooden cladding. The tower keeper Carl Beurle alerted the fire brigade by Morse signals, but could not save himself.

Old manuscripts, communion and baptismal vessels, the marble baptismal font of 1763, and the iron offertory box donated by Ernst Georg Sonnin in the same year were saved from the Michel. The Senate decided the following day to rebuild the church in its previous form.

There was nevertheless heated debate over the form of the reconstruction, and prominent architects including Fritz Schumacher opposed rebuilding from the old plans. In view of the Michel's character as a landmark and the wishes of the population, the old exterior form was ultimately restored, but with a more fire-resistant steel-and-concrete structure in place of the former wooden construction.

The work, led by Julius Faulwasser, lasted six years, and the Michel reopened on October 19, 1912. Photos by Wilhelm Weimar helped recreate the interior.

An anecdote about St. Michael's claims that some of the gilding on the orb atop its tower came from gold melted down in connection with the Doppelkronensache, with the Reichsbank supposedly supplying surplus fine gold to the church's construction workshop. The present tower orb was not installed until the rebuilding after the 1906 fire. The Doppelkronensache, however, had already been settled in 1878.

In 1917, military authorities requisitioned nine of the church's ten bells, the copper roof and the organ facades for weapons production. Five replacement bells were consecrated in 1924.

During World War II, the area surrounding St. Michael's was badly damaged by Allied bombing, while the church itself initially remained almost undamaged. The nave was hit in 1944 and 1945; incendiary bombs pierced the roof and destroyed the pews, the organ and large parts of the interior.

The crypt's reinforced-concrete ceiling protected people who used it as an air-raid shelter. The damage was repaired by 1952, and the church was reconsecrated on October 19 that year.

A major renovation program began in 1983 after corrosion was found in the tower's steel frame. Researchers involved in the tower restoration examined records from the 1906 to 1912 rebuilding and found mentions of gold supplied through the Reichsbank. This appears to be when the gold was first linked to the Doppelkronensache and the anecdote began. The tower work ended in 1996. Further restoration followed, and the church was rededicated on November 29, 2009.

== Architecture ==
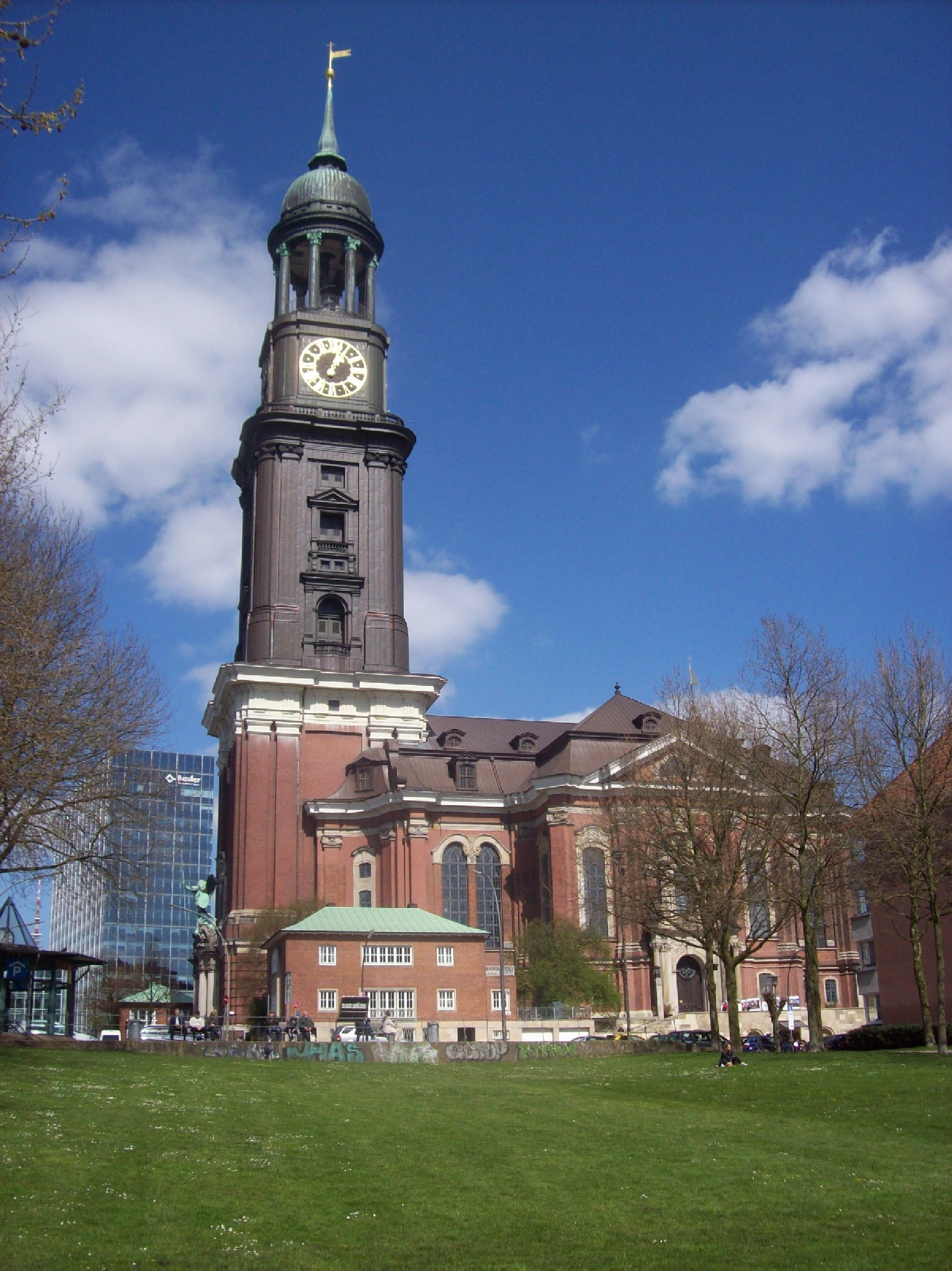
South facade

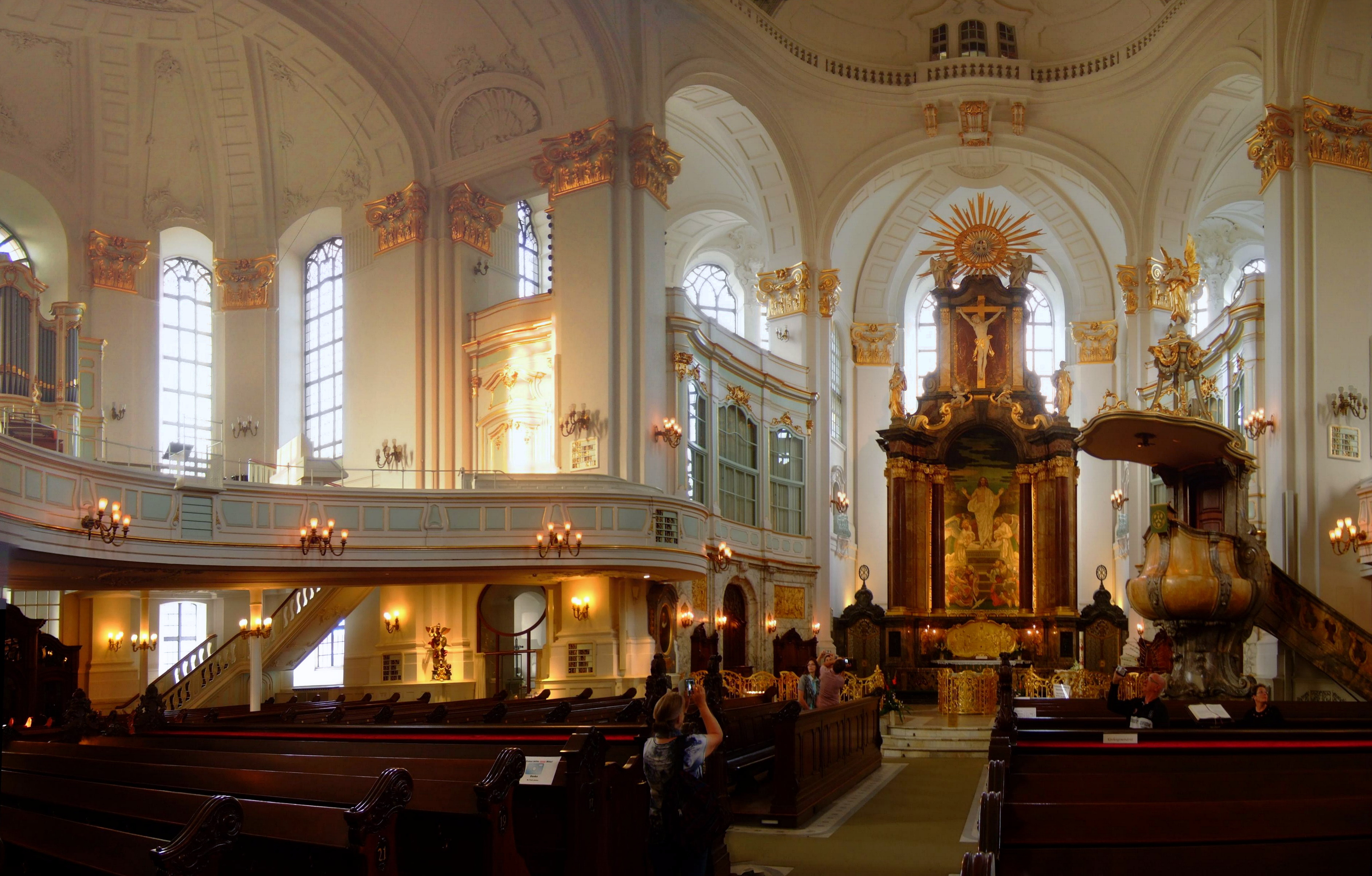
Interior

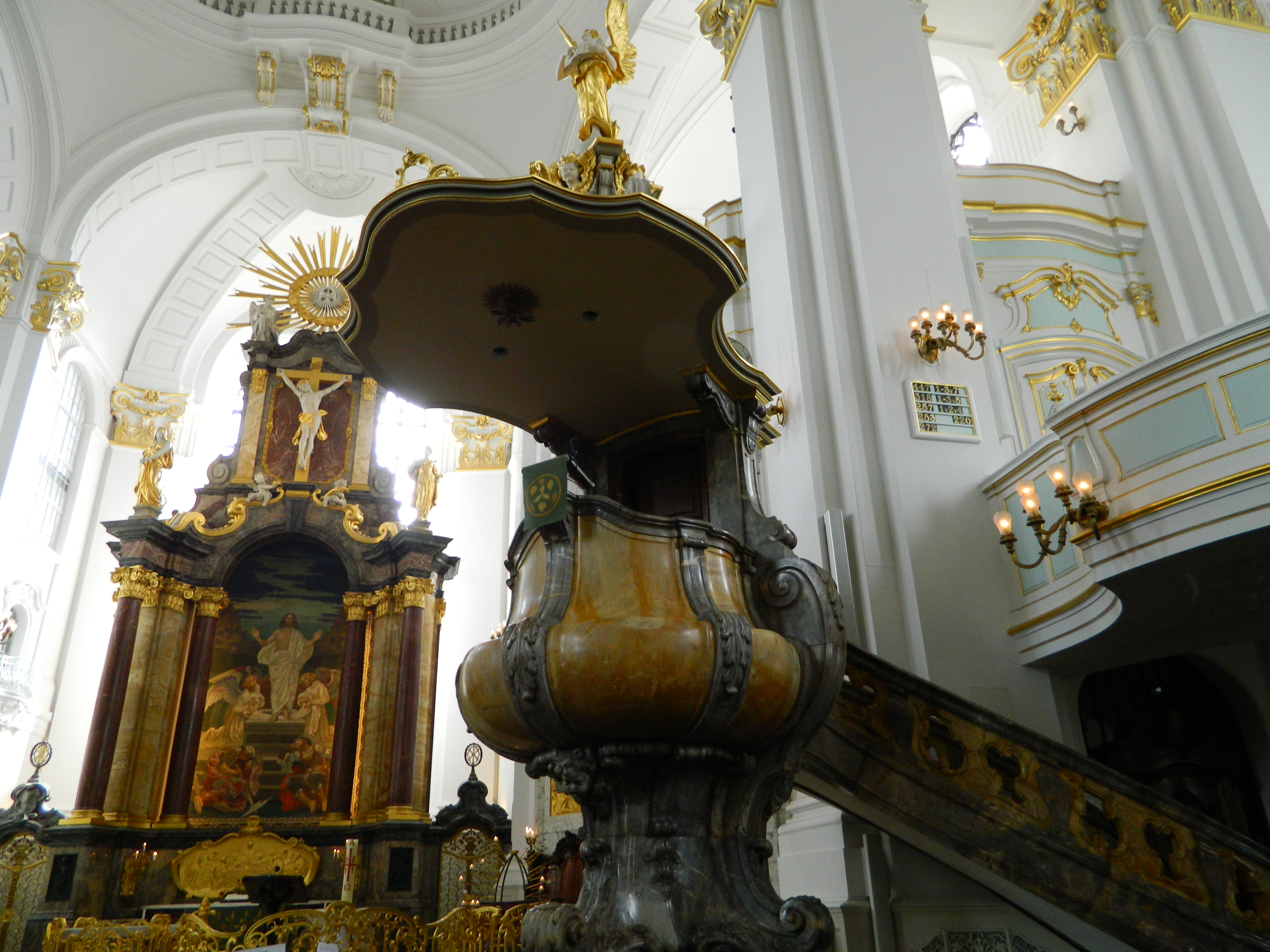
The baroque pulpit and altar of St. Michael's Church

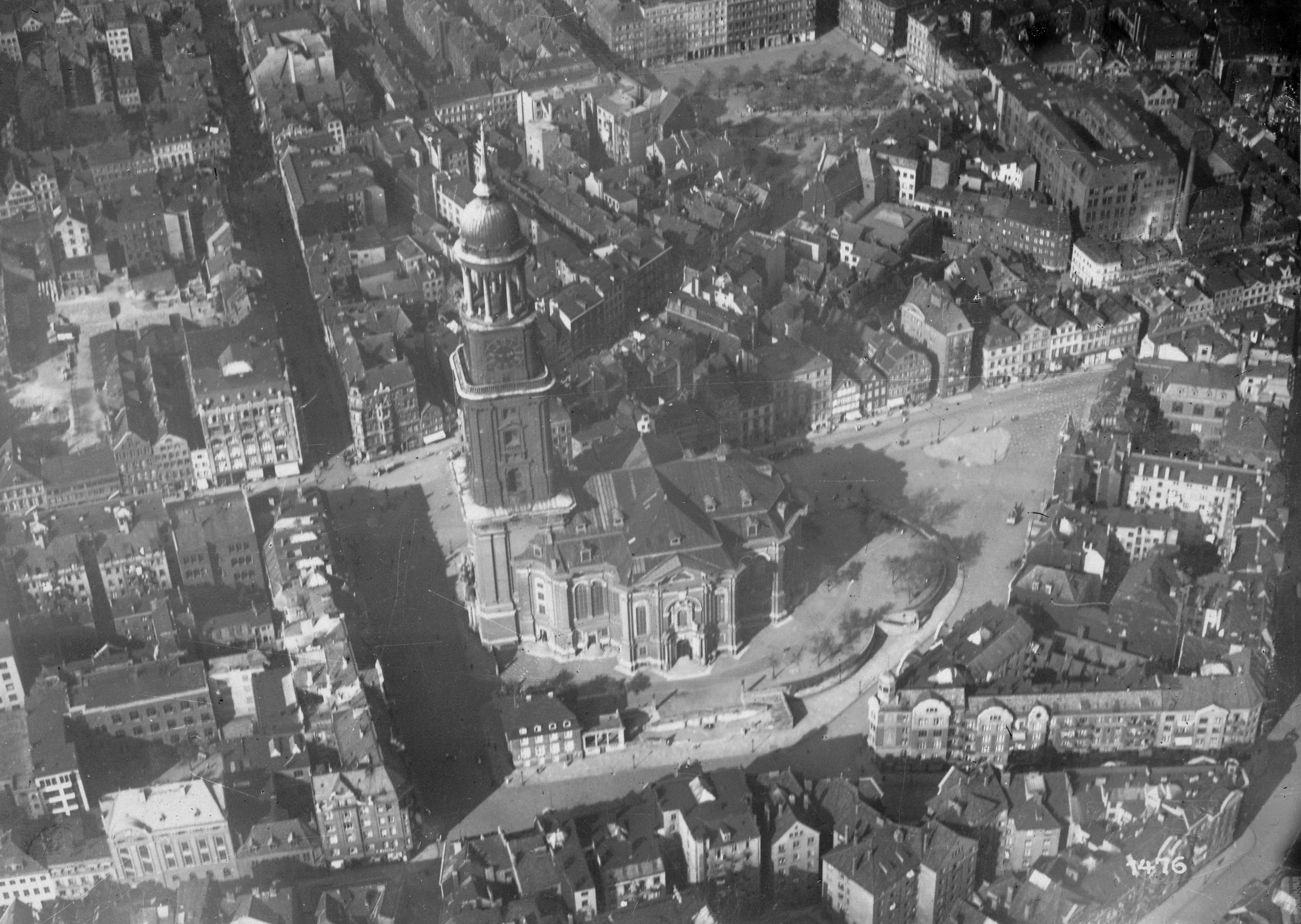
Aerial photo from about 1920

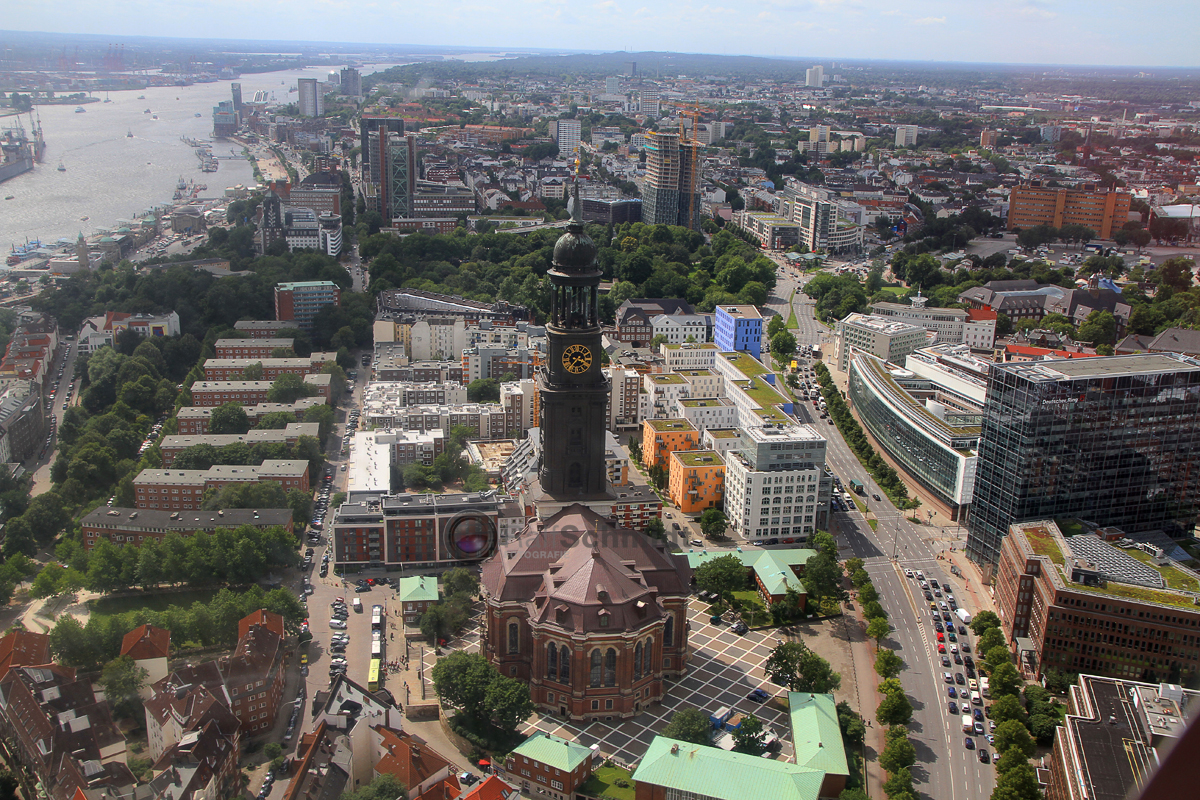
Current aerial view

With 2,500 seats, the Michel is the largest church in Hamburg. The church has a Latin cross plan, measuring 44 m (144 ft) wide, 52 m (171 ft) long and 27 m (89 ft) high.

Some of the front rows of pews are wider and more comfortable than the others. These Senate pews, whose ends bear Hamburg's coat of arms, are intended for members of the government at ceremonial events or funerals.

Since 1913, a memorial plaque in the church has commemorated Hamburg soldiers who died in the German Empire's colonial wars in China and the African colonies. In September 2025, St. Michael's and the Ecumenical Centre of the Evangelical Lutheran Church in Northern Germany organised the public symposium Colonial Heritage in the Church Interior to examine the background and discuss how the plaque should be dealt with in future.

The 132 m (433 ft) clock tower is a significant feature of the city skyline and was a navigation aid for ships sailing on the river Elbe. Its observation deck is about 83 m (272 ft) above ground and 106 m (348 ft) above the Elbe, offering a panoramic view of the city and harbour.

The tower's four 8 m (26 ft) clock faces are the largest in Germany. The minute hands are 4.91 m (16.1 ft) long and the hour hands 3.65 m (12.0 ft) long.

The church has five organs, including a Marcussen concert organ and a large Steinmeyer organ with 86 registers, five manuals and 6,674 pipes. The fifth is a romantic Striebel organ of 1917 in the crypt, named after Felix Mendelssohn Bartholdy.

The pulpit was crafted from marble by the sculptor Otto Lessing in 1910. Designed as a rounded chalice, it has a large staircase and is crowned by the Angel of the Annunciation.

The white-marble baptismal font was made in Livorno in 1763 and donated by Hamburg merchants who lived there. It is reminiscent of a seashell and is supported by three baptismal angels.

The 20 m (66 ft) altar was built from costly marble in 1910. Its three sections illustrate key scenes from the life of Jesus Christ: the central image portrays the Resurrection of Jesus, a relief below it depicts the Last Supper, and a large crucifix stands above.

At the top, the altar crown takes the form of a dove, symbolising the Holy Spirit and surrounded by a radiant circle. Two angels kneel to the right and left of the circle with their heads bowed.

== Traditions ==
In accordance with a 300-year-old custom, the tower keeper of the Michel plays a chorale on his trumpet from the tower windows in all four directions at 10 a.m. and 9 p.m. on weekdays; on Sundays and church holidays this takes place only at noon. Until 1861, it was the signal for the opening and closing of the city gates.

== Crypt ==
The crypt was constructed with the second church and was intended for burials within the building; the sale of burial places helped finance the church. More than 2,000 people were buried there, including its architect Ernst Georg Sonnin and the composers Johann Mattheson and Carl Philipp Emanuel Bach.

Each grave chamber held up to five coffins. During the French occupation of Hamburg in 1813, burials within the city—and thus in the crypt—were prohibited.

During the crypt's 2004–07 restoration, some grave chambers were opened and scientifically documented; the finds are displayed in the crypt. During World War II, the crypt was used as an air-raid shelter, and it is now used for church services and concerts.

== Lutheran bishops ==
St. Michael's is one of the preaching churches of the bishop for the Hamburg and Lübeck district of the Evangelical Lutheran Church in Northern Germany; the other is Lübeck Cathedral.

== Burials ==
- Carl Philipp Emanuel Bach
- Johann Mattheson
- Ernst Georg Sonnin

== See also ==
- List of churches in Hamburg
- List of tallest church towers
- List of largest clock faces
- Hauptkirche (disambiguation)
- Baroque architecture
- The Reformation and its influence on church architecture
