= St. Matthew's Church, Hamburg =

Coordinates: 53°35′20″N 10°00′38″E

St. Matthew's Church
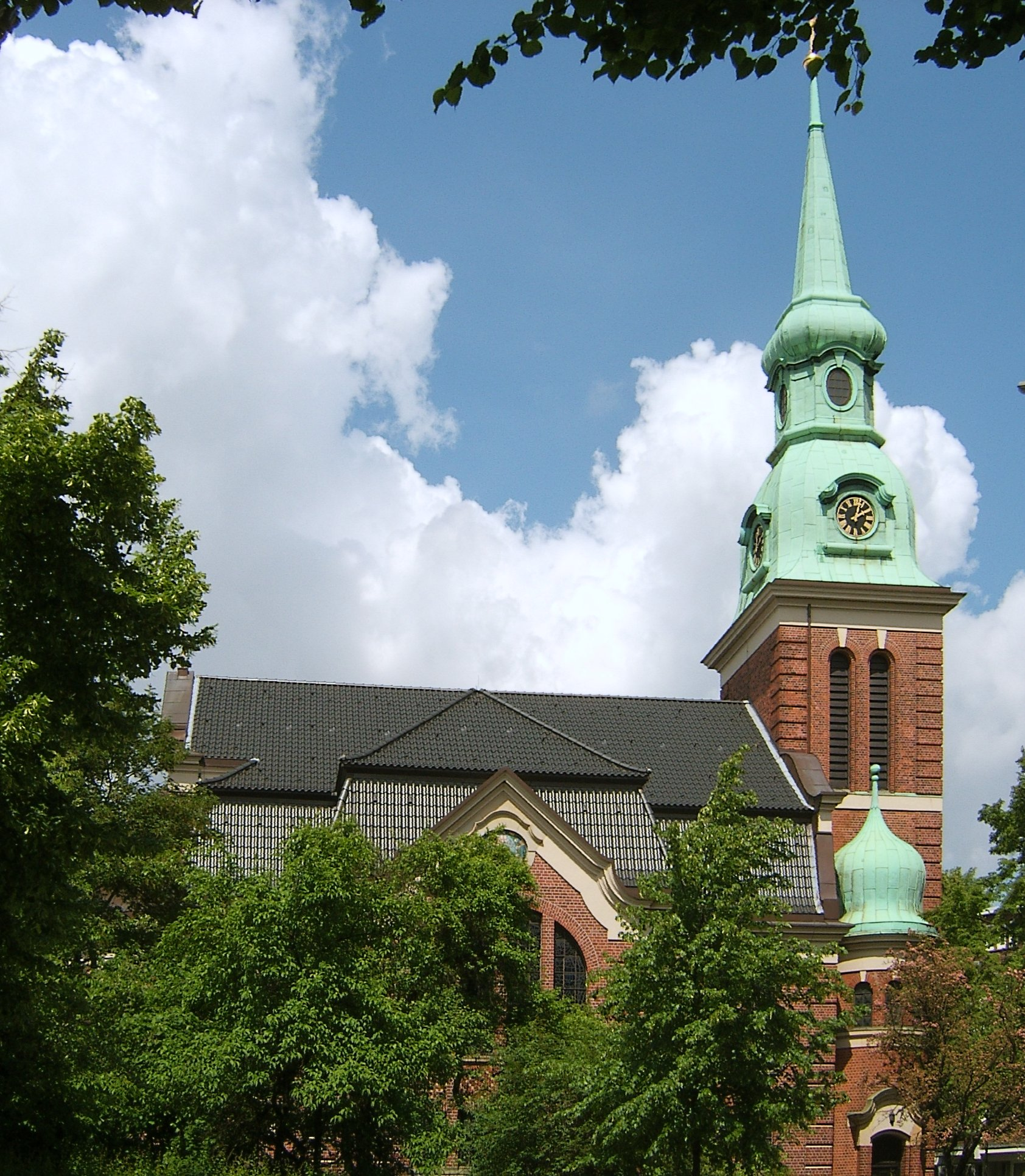
- St. Matthew's Church
- Location: Winterhude, Hamburg
- Country: Germany
- Denomination: Lutheranism

St. Matthew's Church (German: Matthäuskirche) in Winterhude, Hamburg, is a brick Lutheran church built from 1910 to 1912 in the baroque style.

The church is adorned with the colorful windows of Charles Crodel, who also made the stained-glass windows for the main church of St. James's and for St. Mary's Church in Fuhlsbüttel. St. Matthew's windows were created 1961 to 1971,
