= Wilhelm Weimar =

German museum scientist, draftsman, typographer and photographer

Johann Wilhelm Weimar, known as Wilhelm Weimar, (3 December 1857 – 25 June 1917) was a German museum scientist, draftsman, typographer and photographer.

== Early life ==
Weimar was born in Wertheim and studied there at the local Gymnasium until 1872. He went on to train as an engraver in Pforzheim, combining his studies with another four-year training course in draft-drawing and model-making at the Kunstgewerbeschule (vocational school for students working in art and design as an industry) also in Pforzheim. After this, until August 1879 he lived in Karlsruhe training at the Kunstgewerbeschule Karlsruhe. Following this he worked as a building surveyor for the building of the House of Fürstenberg in Donaueschingen. From 1881 till Summer 1882, he studied in the atelier of Karl Hammer in Karlsruhe. From June 1882 onwards, Weimar drew for the Bichweiler'sche Kunstgewerbliche Anstalt in Hamburg.

== Museum career ==
In 1883, Justus Brinckmann, the founding director of the Hamburg Museum für Kunst und Gewerbe (Hamburg Museum of Art and Design), employed Weimar as an assistant draftsman at the museum. By 1888, he was the holder of a newly created position, designed just for him, as "wissenschaftlicher Assistent II. Klasse" (scientific assistant, second class). He was Brinckmann's first and, until 1894, only colleague at the museum. Weimer cataloged the museum's existing decorative arts collection. Along with this he also created art industry equipment, calligraphic diplomas, documentation and literature. The type foundry Genzsch & Heyse published Weimar's fonts Alte Schwabacher, Leibniz-Fraktur and die Hamburger Druckschrift after Weimar's death. They first appeared in the newspaper, Die Heimat.

Weimar died in Hamburg on 25 June 1917.

== Photography ==
After he began his job in 1883, Weimar painted hundreds of the museum exhibits. These painting were used in the first "Führer durch das Museum durch das Hamburgische Museum für Kunst und Gewerbe (Guide through the Hamburg Museum of Art and Design)". After 1890, he began to use halftone reproduction methods which enabled him to produce half-tone pictures of exhibits for use in books and newspapers. At short time later, he began to produce diapositive slides for guides to the museum collection.

Around the turn of the century, he produced a photographic herbarium for the museum, which was published in 1901. Between 1897 and 1917, this wealth of botanical information, with its excellent sense of composition and beauty was an important resource for leaves, plants and flowers. In spring 1915, the museum gave this photographic collection its own exhibition.

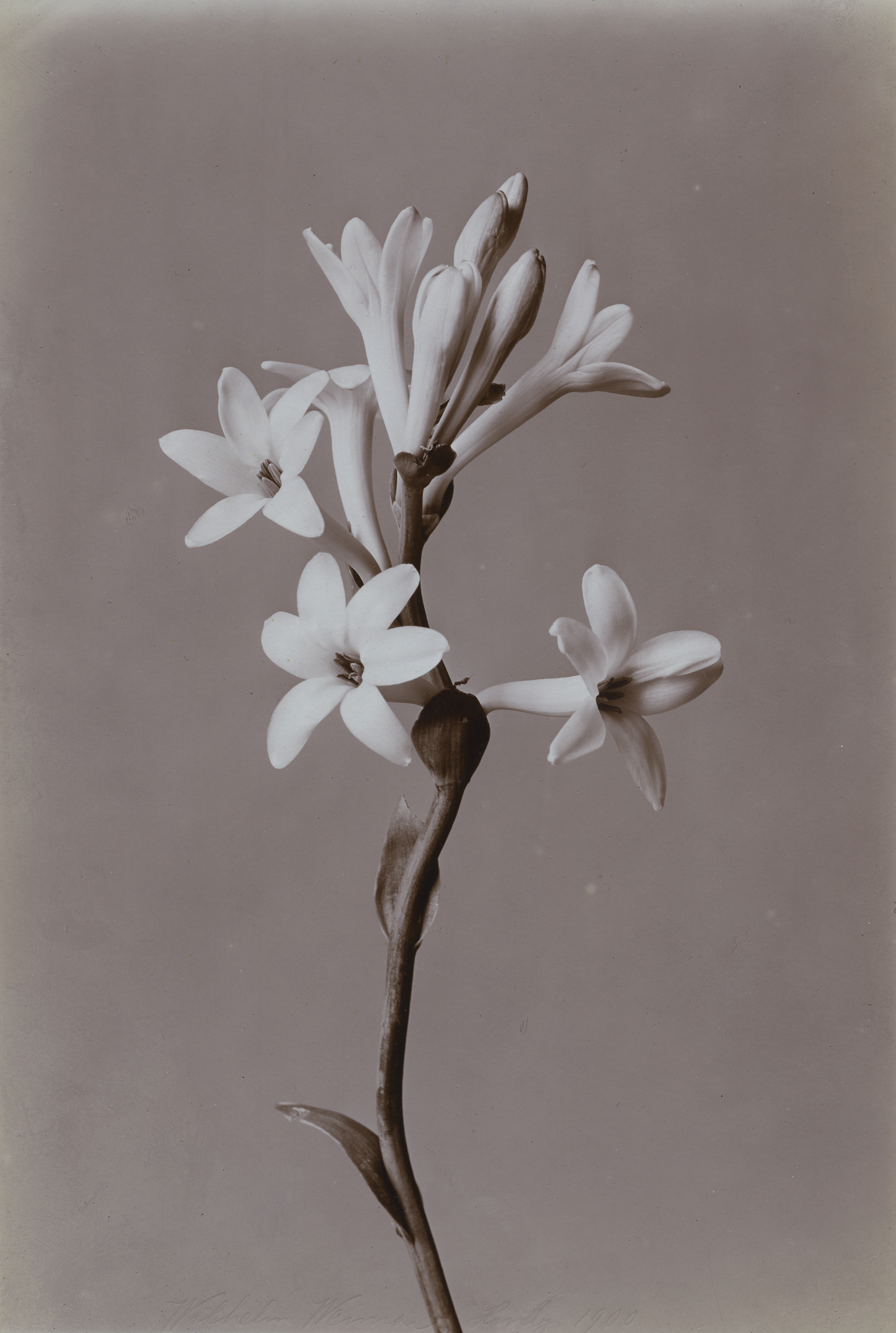
Photo of a Tuberose from the photographic Herbarium of the Museum für Kunst und Gewerbe Hamburg

After it was invented in 1904, Weimar began to use the autochrome method to produce colour photographs of the museum collection. Because of his technical and artistic skills, he was often asked for advice on similar projects at other museums, including the Museum of Hamburg.

Weimar was one of the first to document the beginnings of photography as an art-form and the history of photographic ateliers and their masters, particularly in Hamburg.

In 1915, he collected his detailed research about photography in Hamburg in the book Die Daguerreotypie in Hamburg 1839–1860 (The Daguerreotype in Hamburg 1839–1860). The book is still held up today as both a pioneering work and as an authoritative work in the field.

Together with Brinckmann, Weimar developed a special form of inventorying Hamburg's memorials and monuments. The novelty of their method was that, instead of the central feature of the description of the object being a written description, a photography was used instead. Brinckmann also tasked Weimar with not just capturing the statues in the inner city of Hamburg but also those in surrounding region, where they were in far greater danger of being forgotten and lost. At that time, the wider region of Hamburg still had a lot of older reed-thatched houses, which contained objects that it was vital to catalogue but often fell victim to fires. Houses of this type are often called Low German Houses in English works. Weimar produced many photo-series of the houses and churches of the Vierlande and Marschlande, part of the Bergedorf region of Hamburg, which he catalogued accurately and in great detail. With the same skill and care, he also documented the 1906 building of the Bismarck monument. In 1900, he had thoroughly documented the structures of St. Michael's Church, which burnt down in 1906. Weimar's studies and photographs were the basis for the rebuilding work on the church.

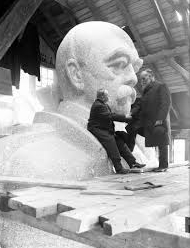
Head of Bismarck from the Bismarck Monument, with the engineers who designed it, Studer und Klemann, 1906

Up until 1912, Weimar continued to develop the art and science of his photography, taking 1200 photographic plates which he labeled with the place and date the photograph was taken, along with information on the time of day, the light conditions and what lens stop he used. Alongside the image he himself produced, Weimar systematically collected daguerreotypes. Because of Weimar's work, the Hamburg Museum für Kunst und Gewerbe could say that it hosted a world-leading collection of photographs. The largest part of the collection is now housed in the Museum für Bergedorf und die Vierlande, which is housed in Bergedorf Castle, the only castle in Hamburg. The majority of the photographic collection is stored in what was formally the magazine of the castle.

Weimar was a member of the Hamburger Künstlerverein von 1832. His work features in the Europeana Photography Collection. Hamburg Museum has also featured his work, particularly on the historical buildings of Hamburg.

== Works ==
- Die Daguerreotypie in Hamburg 1839–1860 (1. Beiheft zum Jahrbuch der Hamburgischen Wissenschaftlichen Anstalten, XXXII, 1914,) [The Daguerreotype in Hamburg 1839-1860 (1st Supplement to the Yearbook of the Hamburg Scientific Society, XXXII, 1914)] Verlag Otto Meissner, Hamburg, 1915.
- Die Daguerreotypie und ihre Ausübung in Hamburg, (8. Sitzung am 22. Februar [1911]), [The Daguerreotype and its Exercise in Hamburg] in Verhandlungen des Naturwissenschaftlichen Vereins in Hamburg, 3. Folge XIX, L. Friedrichsen & Co., Hamburg, 1912, S. LXVII–LXVIII.
- Über photographische Aufnahmen von Pflanzen und Blättern mit durchfallendem Tageslicht; Silhouetten von Blättern, blühenden Pflanzen und Porträts, (32. Sitzung am 27. November [1907]), [About the photography of plants and leaves in failing daylight: silhouettes of leaves, blooming plants and portraits] in: Verhandlungen des Naturwissenschaftlichen Vereins in Hamburg, 3. Folge XV, L. Friedrichsen & Co., Hamburg, 1908, S. LXXXIX–XCI.
