= Bismarck Monument (Hamburg) =

Monument in Hamburg, Germany

Bismarck monument
- Bismarck-Denkmal
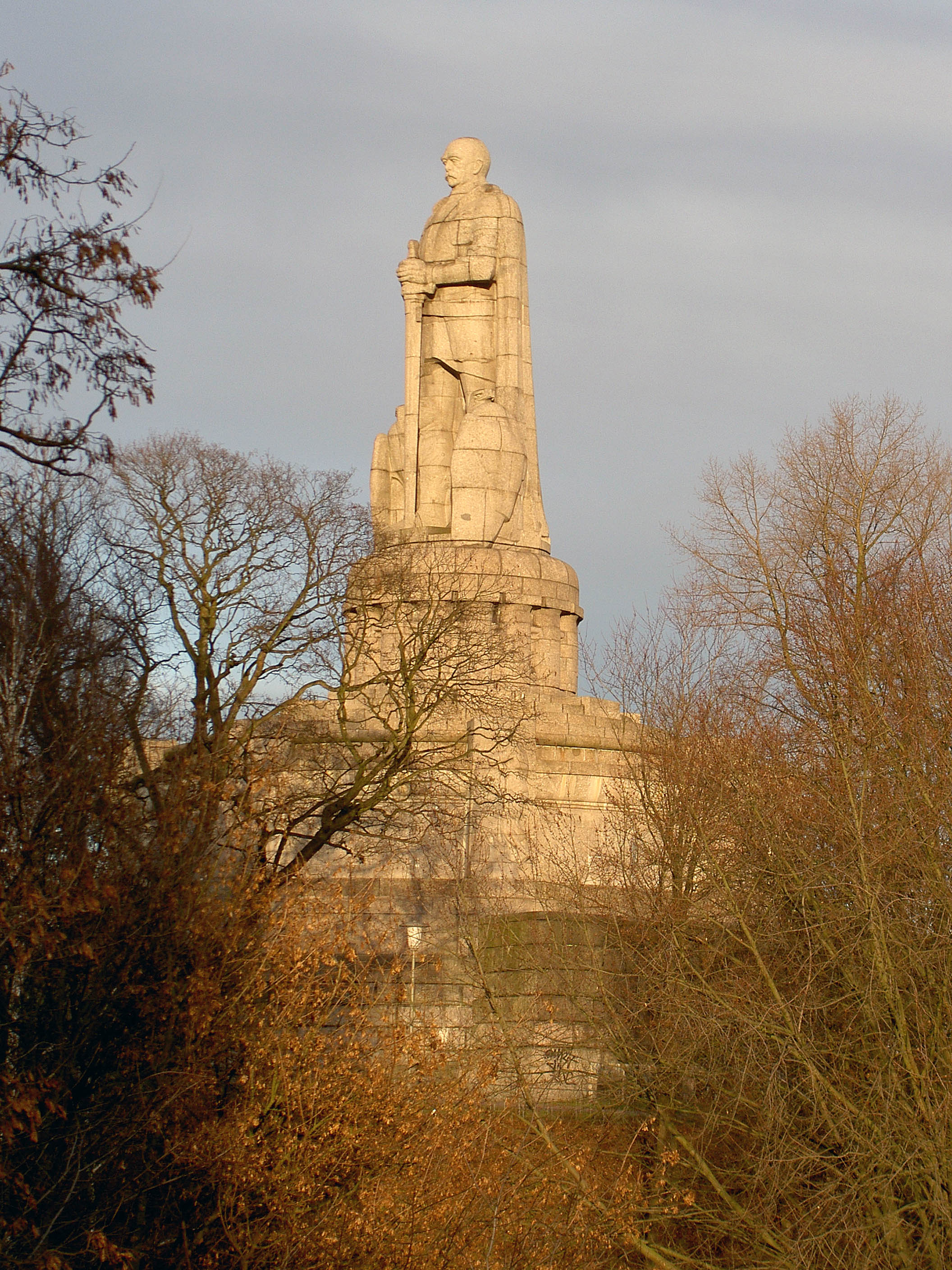
- View of the monument from the southwest in 2004
- Interactive map of Bismarck monument
- Location: Hamburg, Germany
- Coordinates: 53°32′55″N 9°58′19″E
- Designer: Architect: Johann Emil Schaudt; Sculptor: Hugo Lederer
- Material: Granite
- Height: 35 m (115 ft)
- Opening date: 2 June 1906
- Dedicated to: Otto von Bismarck

The Bismarck Monument (German: Bismarck-Denkmal) in Hamburg is a memorial sculpture located in the St. Pauli quarter dedicated to Otto von Bismarck. It is one of 240 memorials to Bismarck worldwide and is the largest and probably best-known of these Bismarck towers. The monument stands near the jetties of Hamburg port on the Elbhöhe, today a local recreation area. The architect was Johann Emil Schaudt; the sculptor was Hugo Lederer.

== History ==
The site of the monument was previously occupied by the Elbpavillon restaurant which was removed in 1901. Mayor Johann Georg Mönckeberg established a citizens' commission to erect the monument at the site.

The Bismarck Monument cost 500,000 Goldmarks to erect, and it was completed in 1906. The building of the monument was documented by the photographer Wilhelm Weimar, who worked for the Hamburg Museum für Kunst und Gewerbe.

== Architecture ==
The monument is approximately 35 m (115 ft) high, weighs 600 t (590 long tons; 660 short tons), and is the world's largest Bismarck monument.

The designers created a large network of catacombs beneath the monument. In the years 1939 to 1940, they became an air-raid shelter, offering protection for up to 650 people. The architect's intent for the catacombs remain unknown, however, as they, and the whole interior of the monument, are no longer accessible for safety reasons. In the 1970s, a soldier who had served in the British army during the occupation in Germany discovered a tunnel beneath the Bismarck memorial which led to a Nazi hideout while in Hamburg. He contacted the Daily Mirror newspaper which, in turn, contacted the Burgermeister in Hamburg. After viewing the tunnel that the soldier had described, authorities decided to seal it.

== See also ==
- Bismarck Monument
- Bismarck Memorial
- Bismarck tower

== Literature ==
- Jörg Schilling: Distanz halten - Das Hamburger Bismarckdenkmal und die Monumentalität der Moderne, Wallstein-Verlag, Göttingen 2006, ISBN 3-8353-0006-7
