= Hugo Lederer =

German sculptor (1871–1940)

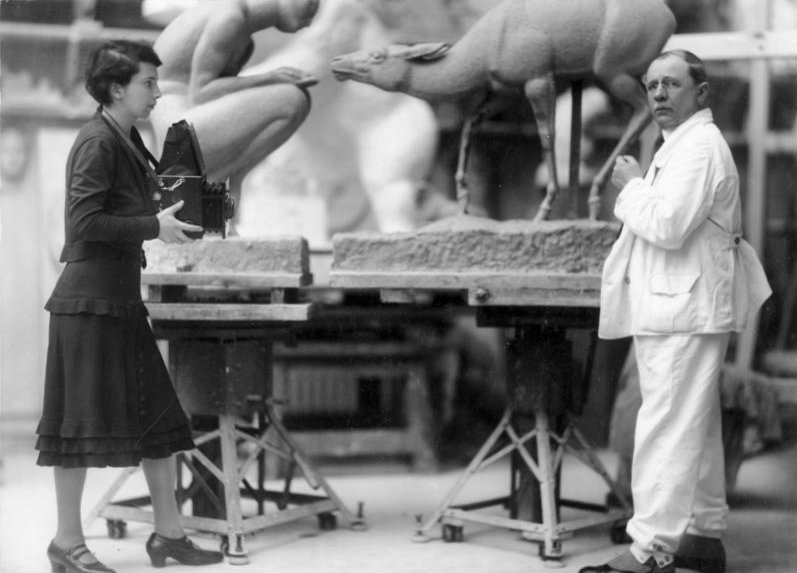
Hugo Lederer with Yva

Hugo Lederer (16 November 1871 – 1 August 1940) was an Austro-Hungarian-born German sculptor.

== Biography ==
Lederer was born on 16 November 1871 in Znojmo. He studied in Dresden under sculptor John Schilling from 1890, then briefly under Christian Behrens. His greatest success came in 1902 with the commission for the Bismarck Monument in the center of Hamburg. In 1919 Lederer went to the Academy of Arts in Berlin; among his students was Josef Thorak. Lederer's last major work was for the Krupp organization.

Lederer died on 1 August 1940 in Berlin. He is buried in Wilmersdorfer Waldfriedhof in Stahnsdorf near Berlin.

== Sculptural works ==
- Schicksal, 1896, Ohlsdorf Cemetery, Hamburg
- Bismarck-Denkmal, 1902–1906, Elbhöhe, Hamburg (with architect Emil Schaudt)
- Fechter-Brunnen, 1904, Universitätsplatz, Breslau
- Kaiser Friedrich III.-Reiterstandbild (), 1911, Kaiserplatz, Aachen
- Löwendenkmal, Theodor Tantzen-Platz, Oldenburg
- Ringer, 1908, Heerstraße, Berlin-Charlottenburg
- Bismarck-Standbild, 1911, in Wuppertal-Barmen
- Gedenkrelief für Freiherr vom Stein, 1914, Rathaus Berlin-Schöneberg
- Bärenbrunnen, 1928, Werderscher Markt, Berlin-Mitte
- Säugende Bärin, 1929, Rathaus/Finanzamt, Berlin-Zehlendorf
- Grabmal Gustav Stresemann, Friedensnobelpreisträger, 1929–1930, Luisenstädtischer Friedhof, Berlin-Kreuzberg
- Fruchtbarkeits-Brunnen, 1927–1934, Arnswalder Platz, Prenzlauer Berg, Berlin
- Regiments-Kriegerdenkmal 1914–1918 des Grenadier-Regiments zu Pferde (Neumärkisches) No. 3, 1923 eingeweiht, Treptow a. Rega, Farther Pomerania
- Kriegerdenkmal 1914–1918, c. 1925, Marktplatz, Altdamm, Farther Pomerania

== Gallery ==
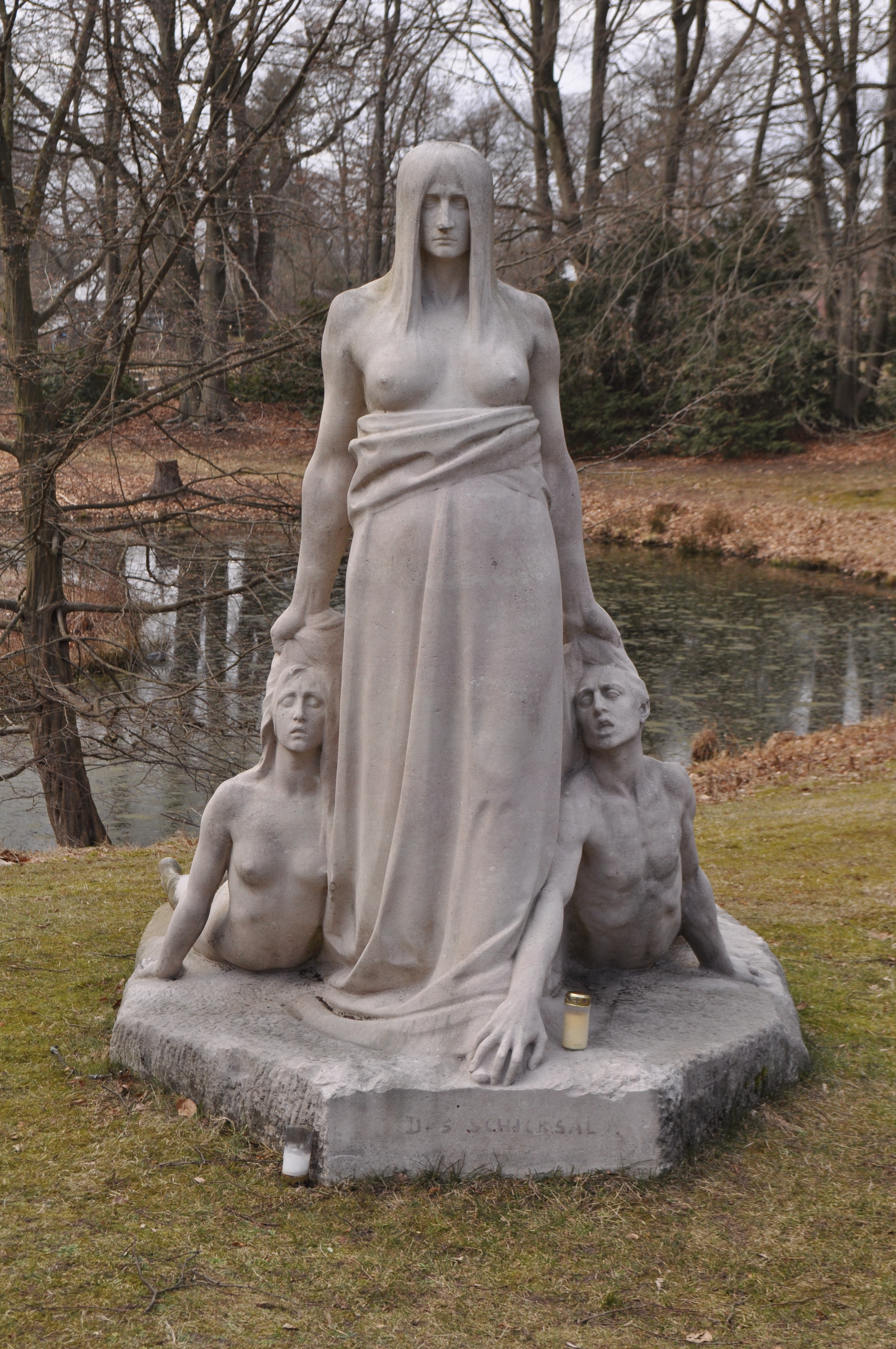
Schicksal, Ohlsdorf Cemetery, Hamburg, 1896

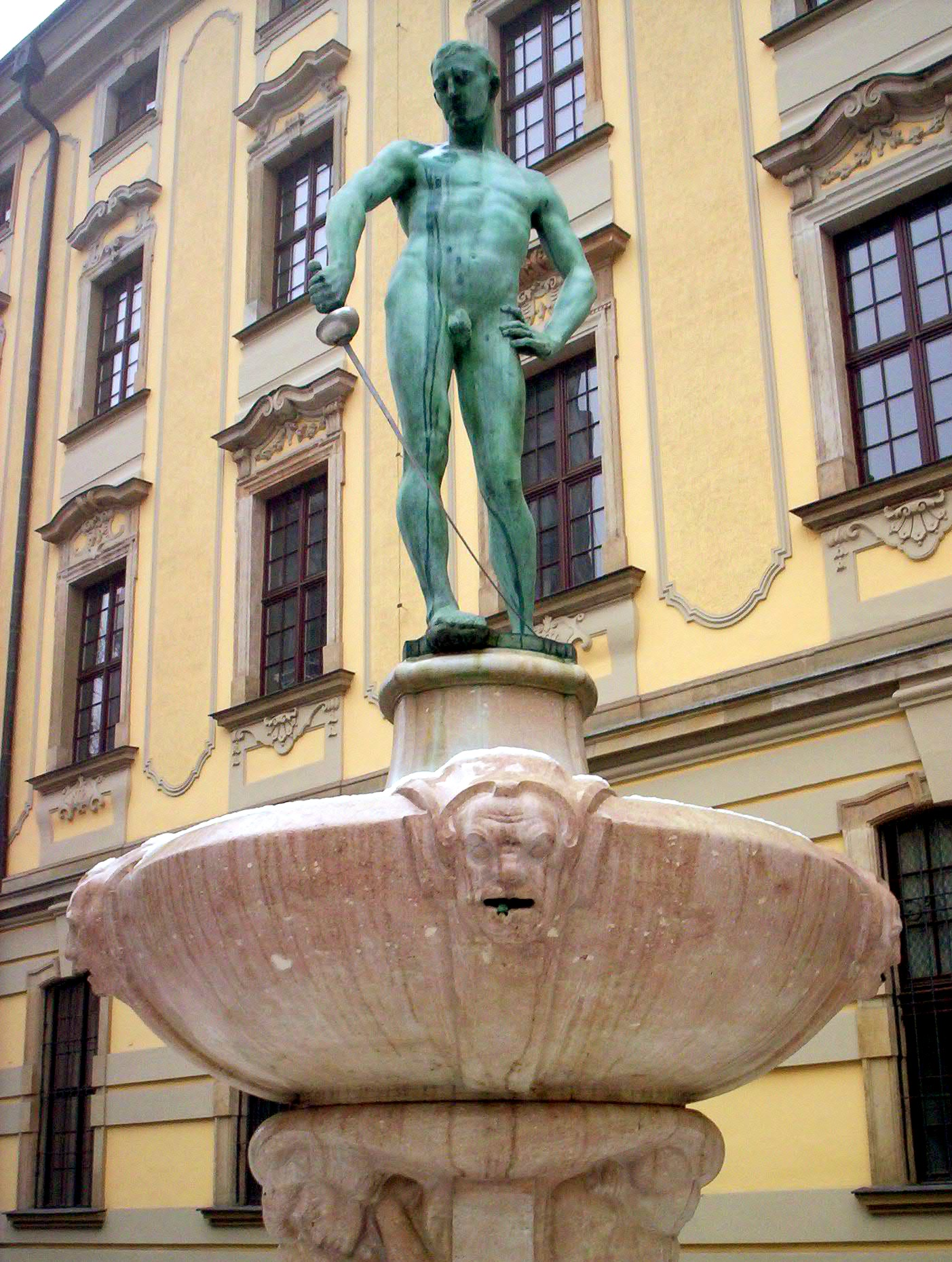
Fountain in Wrocław

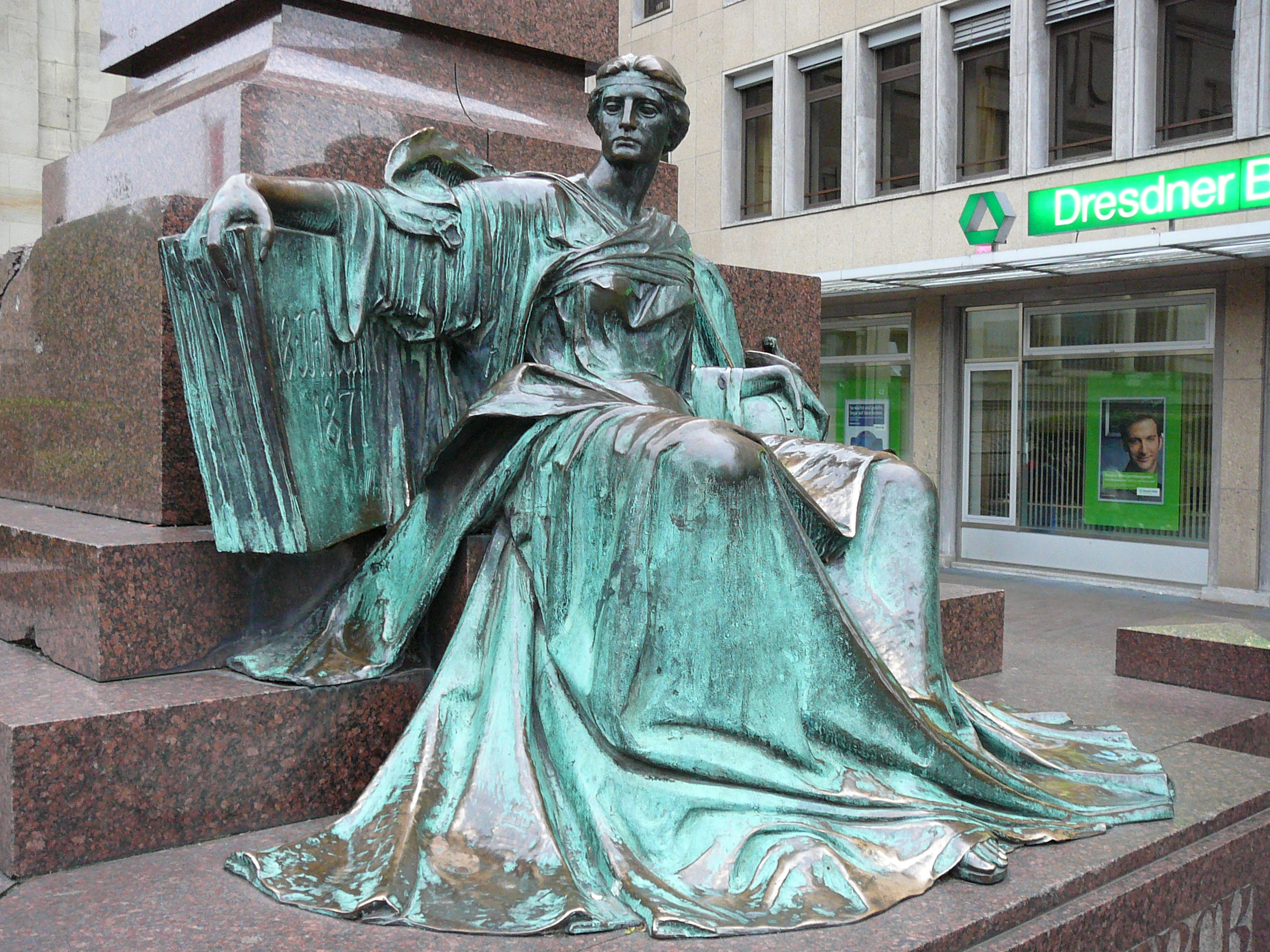
Clio, in front of a Bismarck monument in Barmen, 1900

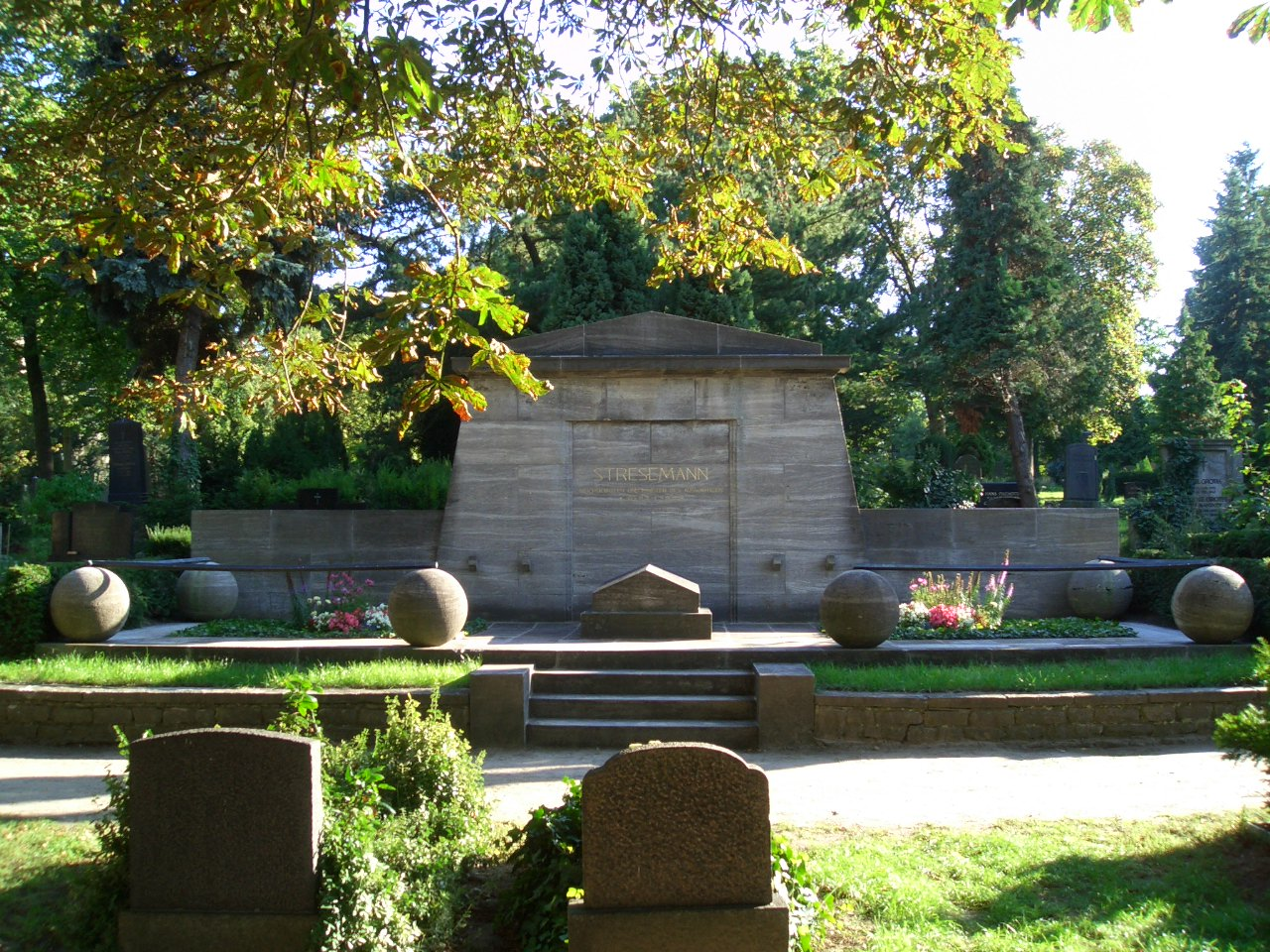
Gravesite of Gustav Stresemann, Luisenstadt Cemetery, 1930

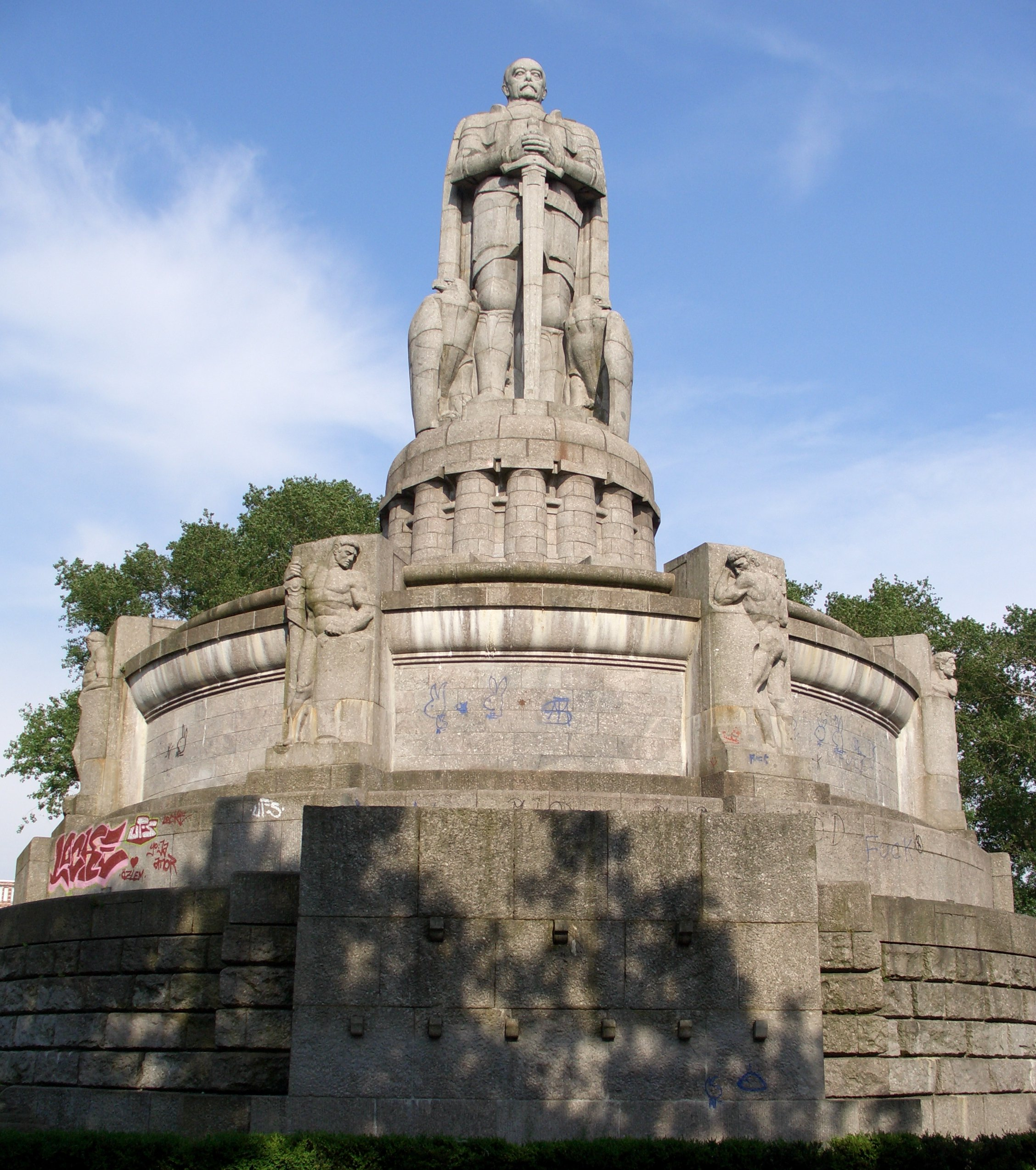
Bismarck Memorial, Hamburg, front view
