= Jan Valtin =

German author

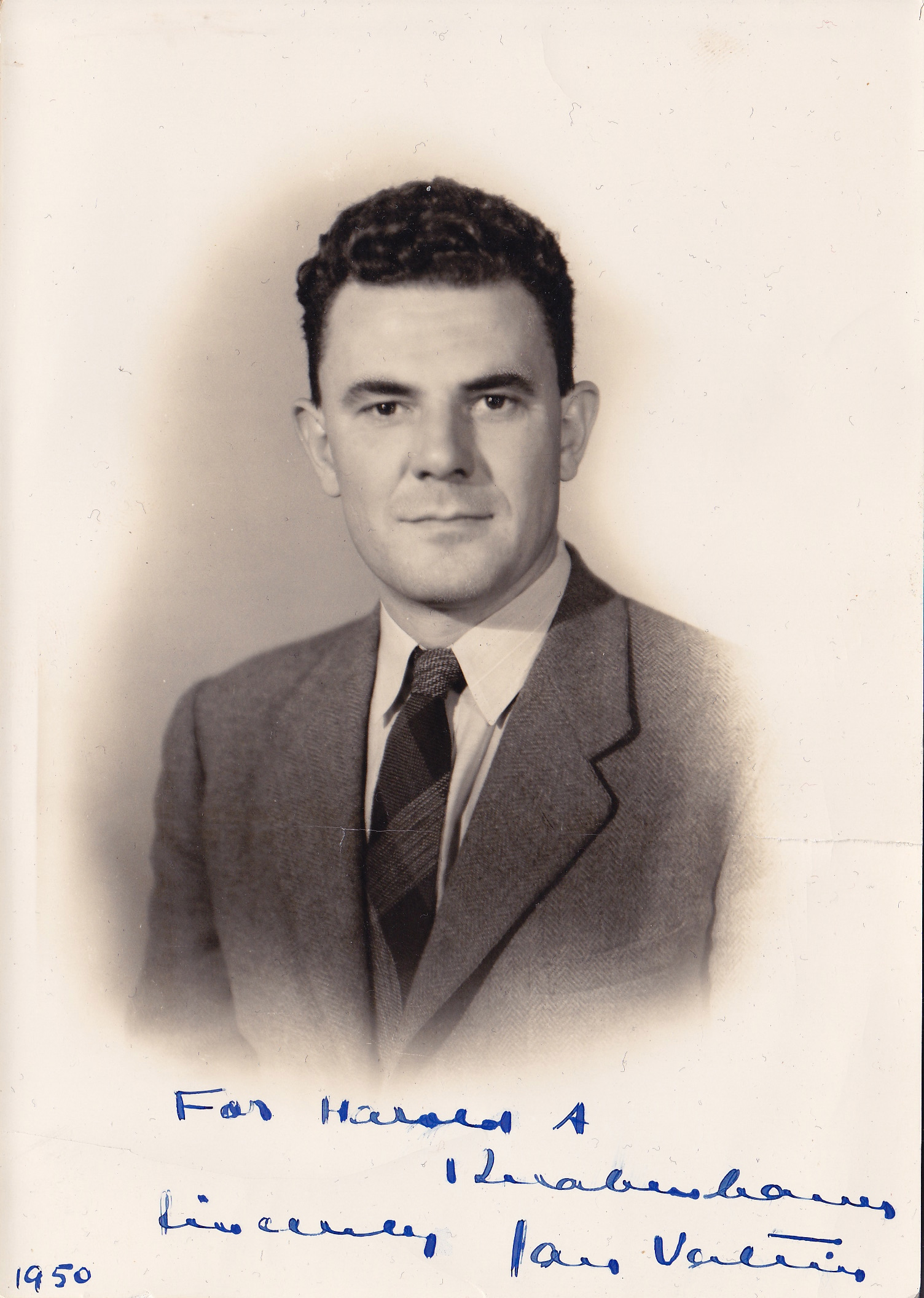
Jan Valtin in 1950

Richard Julius Hermann Krebs (December 17, 1905 - January 1, 1951), better known by his alias Jan Valtin, was a German writer during the interwar period. He settled in the United States in 1938, and in 1940 (as Valtin) wrote his bestselling book Out of the Night.

== Background ==
Krebs became active in the Communist movement as a boy, when his father was involved in the naval mutiny that heralded the German Revolution of 1918–19.

== Career ==
In the second week of May 1923, Valtin joined the German Communist Party, and participated in the Hamburg Uprising. Valtin stated, "I learned well the Party principle that the heart of the Comintern...must consist of an inner organization of men and women whose one and only aim in life is to work for the revolution; who are ready for any personal sacrifice the Party should demand, who are pledged to unreserved obedience to their Central Committee and utmost unity of aims."

Valtin was selected to attend the Leningrad Communist University. Subjects ranged according to Valtin, "from "Marx's ' theory of surplus value' to the 'application of Clausewitz's Rules of Warfare in the conduct of strikes,' from 'revolutionary defeatism and the transformation of an imperialist war into a civil war' to 'mass psychology and propaganda'."

=== Arrest ===
In 1926, working as a courier, he stowawayed to Victoria, British Columbia and then hitch hiked to San Francisco and made contact with the Comintern. Valtin was assigned to execute someone in Los Angeles, but failed in the attempt, was caught, and sentenced to San Quentin State Prison. During the 1000 days he spent there, he studied Bowditch's American Practical Navigator, astronomy, journalism, map making, English, French, and Spanish. After being released in December 1929, he returned to Europe.

In January 1931, while in Germany, he participated in the "United action of the Communist Party and the Hitler movement to accelerate the disintegration of the crumbling democratic bloc which governs Germany." After graduating with a navigator's certificate, he was assigned as the Soviet skipper transporting the Pioner from the Bremer Vulkan shipyard to Murmansk.

=== Out of the Night ===
In February 1933, Valtin states, "We in the upper ranks of the Party had no illusions as to the terror that would soon be unleashed against us by the Hitler movement. Our wild general strike call was a God-send to Hitler. It enabled him to proceed to the crushing even of liberal anti-Nazi forces under the cry, 'Save Germany from Bolshevism and Civil War!'."

On 30 November 1933, Valtin was arrested by the Gestapo. Held at Concentration Camp Fuhlsbuettel, Valtin states, "I had thought much about the black, humiliating defeat of the Communist Party of Germany, and I could not find a satisfying answer. The Gestapo broke me on March 11, 1934."

On 29 September 1936, still a prisoner of the Gestapo, Valtin was told by the Comintern to seek undercover work within the Gestapo organization. On 17 February 1937, he pledged "...my willingness to accept and execute to the best of my abilities all and any orders issued to me by the Secret State Police of Germany (Gestapo)." By May 1937, he departed Germany as ordered to establish contact with the Comintern in Copenhagen. By September, Valtin states, "I accused myself of allowing my love for my wife and child to make me waver in my life-long commitment to Stalin's cause...I began to hate the movement I served, hate its hypocrisy, hate the brigands who led it."

Severing ties with the Gestapo, Valtin was arrested by the G.P.U. in Copenhagen. However, in January 1938, Valtin was able to escape. In December, he received word that his wife Firelei had perished in Fuhlsbuettel.

In 1938, he returned to the United States to settle, this time under his most famous alias, Jan Valtin - where he published the highly publicized autobiography Out of the Night. In the book he described in detail the actions he supposedly had carried on as a secret agent of the Soviet State Political Directorate, or GPU. The 1926 attempted murder was described by Krebs/Valtin as a GPU operation. The book received great critical acclaim. A 1940 review for the Saturday Review of Literature reads: "No other books more clearly reveals the aid which Stalin gave to Hitler before he won power".

=== Congressional testimony ===
Valtin/Krebs was invited to testify before the Dies Committee as regards Soviet secret activities in Europe.

On May 26, 1941, Richard Julius Krebs testified before the House of Representatives' Subcommittee of the Special Committee to Investigate Un-American Activities (the "Dies Committee") that he had worked for the Gestapo for the Comintern. Research director J.B. Matthews had Sender Garlin had reviewed Out of the Night unfavorably in the Daily Worker newspaper of January 21, 1941. Garlin claimed no "Jan Valtin" existed and that the book's authors were Isaac Don Levine, Walter Krivitsky, and Freda Utley (known ex- or anti-communists). Krebs said he had defected in December 1937 - January 1938.

=== Arrest ===
In November 1942, Krebs was also indicted as a Gestapo agent. He was arrested in December 1942 and found innocent in May 1943. The Los Angeles court record revealed that the 1926 crime had no political purpose. This event marked the end of Krebs/Valtin's career as a "Soviet expert". The New York Mirror said about his book Out of the Night: "In effect, the decision means he perpetrated a huge literary hoax."

=== US war service ===
In August 1943, Krebs was drafted as an infantryman and deployed in February 1944 to the Philippines in fighting the Japanese in the Pacific War. In 1946, his book Children of Yesterday, an anecdotal history of the 24th Infantry Division was published, describing in graphic detail the horrors of the fighting and everyday life of the division's troops.

He was granted citizenship in 1947.

== Personal life and death ==
On 27 September 1932, Jan's first wife Firelei, gave birth to their son Jan. According to elder Jan, "On the wall above the bed was a picture showing Lenin in a pensive pose. A Party physician and a nurse from the corps of communist Samaritans attended."

Valtin/Krebs married again, before 1941, to Abigail Harris, an American. At the time of his death The Evening Star newspaper reported that he had been married three times, his third wife being Clara Medders of Chestertown, Md., and that he had three sons from his previous marriages.

Richard Krebs died at the Kent-Queen Anne's Hospital on the evening of January 1, 1951 from lobar pneumonia. Prior to his death he had resided in Betterton, Md. for about six years.

The Board of Immigration Appeals declared:

His life has been so marked with violence, intrigue and treachery that it would be difficult, if not wholly unwarranted, to conclude that his present reliability and good character have been established. [...] Within the past five years the subject has been considered an agent of Nazi Germany. On the record before us it appears he has been completely untrustworthy and amoral."

The truth, however, is more complex. After he served his time in custody as ordered by US immigration authorities, he led a useful life putting the allegations of amorality and untrustworthiness to the lie. Then, late in life, Richard Krebs came to the service of his country in the clandestine anti-communist efforts launched by the US intelligence agencies still operating in Europe in the early years of the Cold War. To understand this view see SPYWRITER: Richard Krebs’ Astonishing Journey from German Communist Conspirator to American Combat Hero.

== Works ==
- Out of the Night (1940)
- Bend in the River (1942)
- Children of Yesterday (1946)
- Castle in the Sand (1947)
- Wintertime (1950)
