= Klein Borstel station =

Railway station in Hamburg, Germany

Coordinates: 53.6278°N 10.0333°E

Klein Borstel
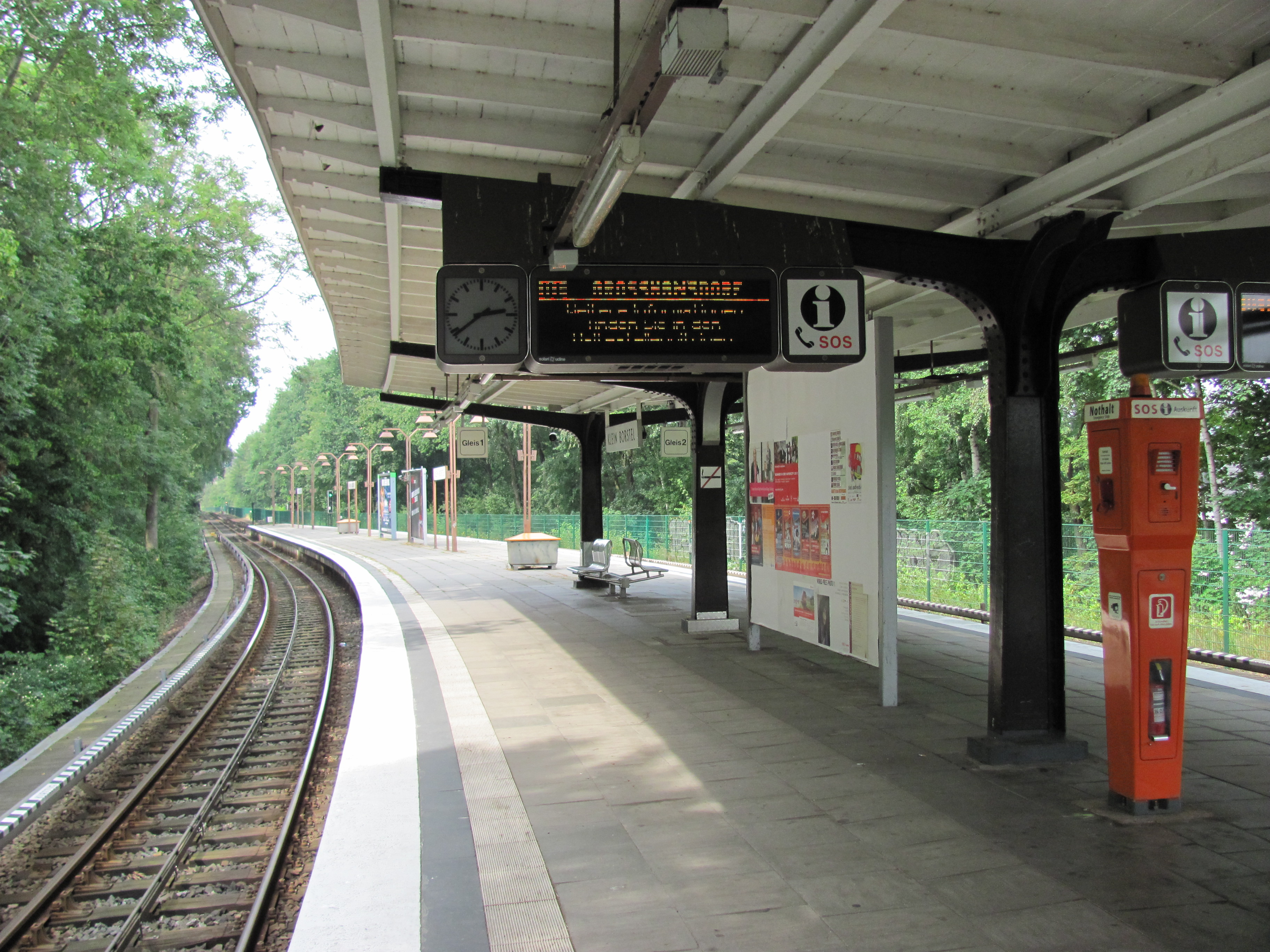

General information
- Location: Wellingsbüttler Landstraße; 22337 Hamburg, Germany
- System: Hamburg U-Bahn station
- Operator: Hamburger Hochbahn AG
- Line: U1
- Platforms: 1 island platform
- Tracks: 2

Construction
- Structure type: Elevated
- Accessible: Yes

Other information
- Station code: HHA: KB
- Fare zone: HVV: A/203 and 204

History
- Opened: 25 May 1925

Services
Preceding station	Hamburg U-Bahn	Following station
Fuhlsbüttel towards Norderstedt Mitte	U1	Ohlsdorf towards Großhansdorf or Ohlstedt
Location

Klein Borstel is a station on the Hamburg U-Bahn line U1. It was opened in May 1925 and is located in Hamburg, Germany, in the suburb of Klein Borstel in the quarter of Ohlsdorf. Ohlsdorf is part of the borough of Hamburg-Nord.

== History ==
The station was opened in May 1925, it was the last to open on the Langenhorn railway. The station is one of the less frequented stations of the Hamburg U-Bahn. It was fully renovated in 1955. In 1939 and in 1974 the platform was extended to allow the stop of longer trains.

The track of the freight railway from Ohlsdorf to Ochsenzoll was located east of the U-Bahn tracks. It was used until 1991 and removed in 2008.

== Station layout ==
The station is an elevated station with an island platform and two tracks. As of 2025, The station is accessible for handicapped persons with help, as there is a lift.

== Service ==
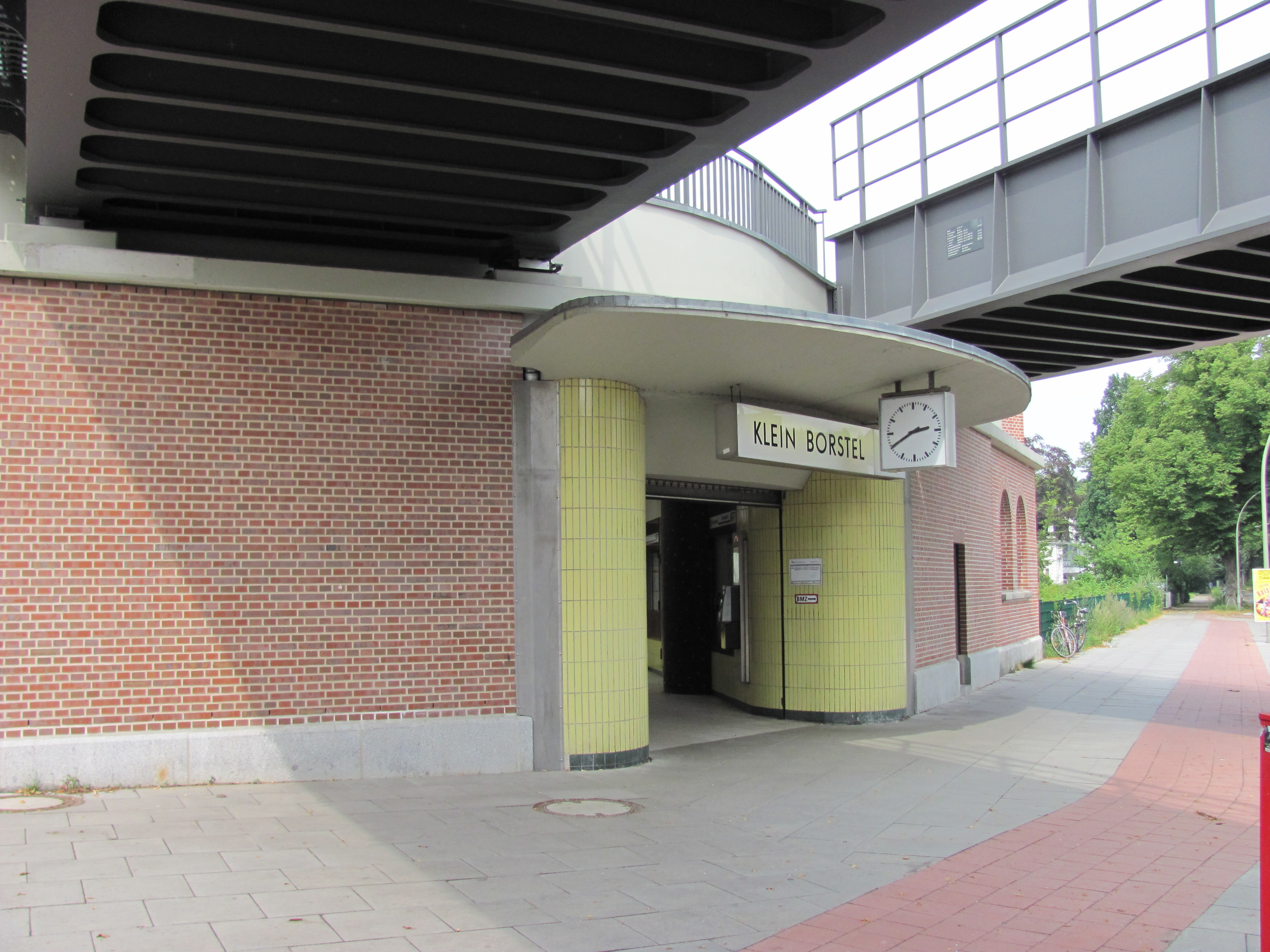
The station's entrance

=== Trains ===
Klein Borstel is served by Hamburg U-Bahn line U1; departures are every 5 minutes, every 10 minutes in non-busy periods.

== See also ==
- List of Hamburg U-Bahn stations
