= Fritz Schumacher =

Fritz Schumacher may refer to:

- Fritz Schumacher (architect) (1869–1947), German architect and urban designer
- E. F. Schumacher (Ernst Friedrich "Fritz" Schumacher, 1911–1977), economist and founder of the charity Intermediate Technology Development Group

== See also ==
- Friedrich Schumacher, World War I German flying ace
