= St. James' Church, Hamburg =

Church in Hamburg, Germany

St. James' Church
- Hauptkirche St. Jacobi
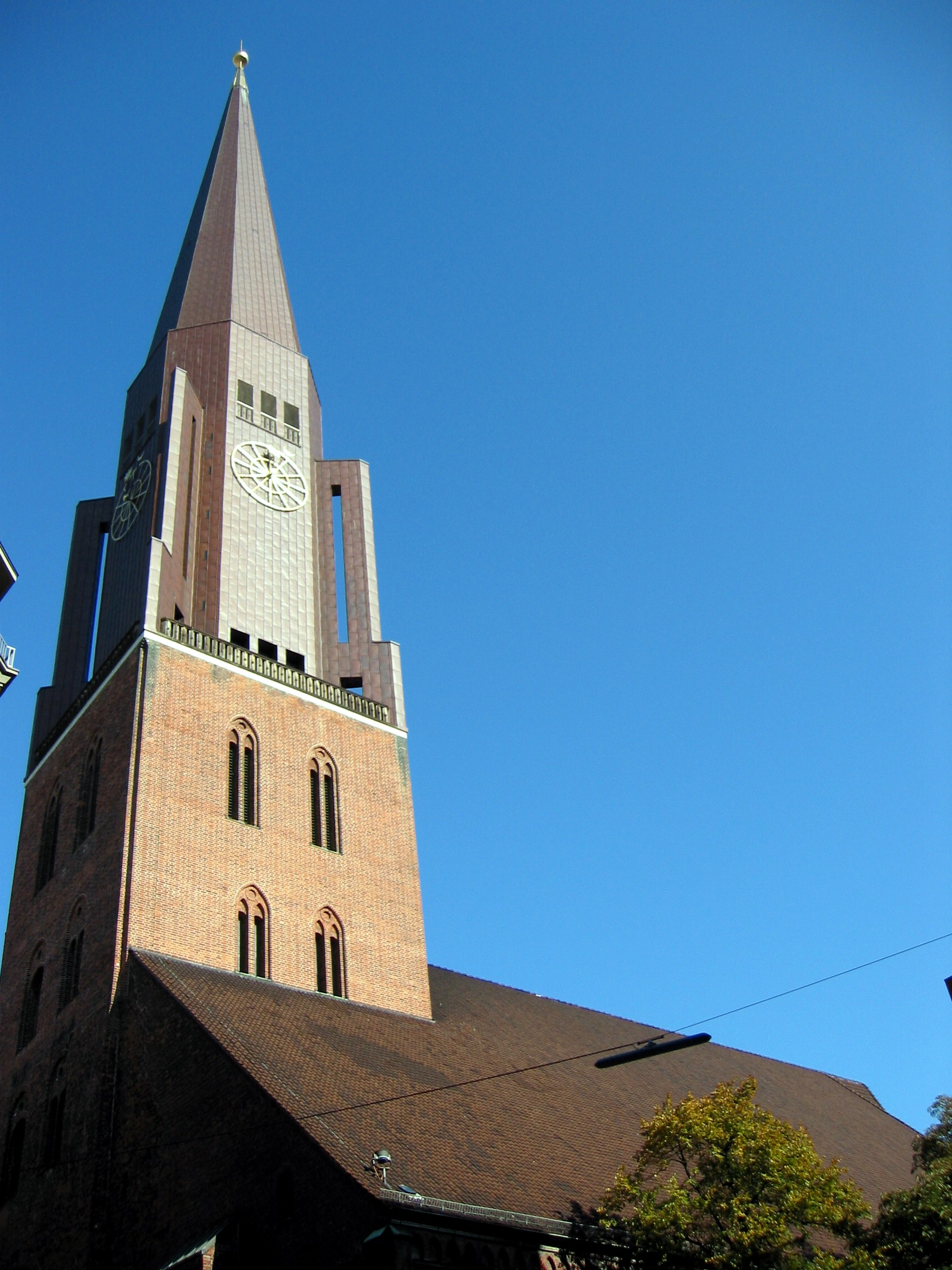
- St. James' Church
- 53°33′01″N 10°00′02″E
- Location: Quarter Neustadt, Hamburg, Germany
- Denomination: Lutheran
- Previous denomination: Roman Catholic

History
- Status: Cathedral

Architecture
- Style: Gothic

St. James' Church (German: Hauptkirche St. Jacobi) is one of the five principal churches (Hauptkirchen) of Hamburg. In 1529, it became a Lutheran church. It is located directly in the city centre, has a 125 m-tall (410 ft) tower and features a famous organ by Arp Schnitger from 1693. It is dedicated to St James the Greater and often incorrectly referred to in English as St Jacob's.

== History ==
The history of the church goes back to 1255 when St. James' was a small Roman Catholic chapel located outside the Hamburg city walls. After these were extended in 1260, it became part of the Hamburg city territory. It is now in the heart of the city, hidden behind one of the main shopping streets (Mönckebergstraße).

Between 1350 and 1400, the chapel was replaced by a hall church with three naves, similar to St. Peter's. Around one hundred years later, a fourth nave was added to the south side of the structure. The sacristy in the northeast also comes from this time (1438) and is today Hamburg's only example of secular gothic architecture.

From 1806 to 1813, when Hamburg was occupied by Napoleonic troops, the church was used mainly as stables.

The second tower, erected in 1826/27 after the previous one had become dilapidated, was destroyed in 1944, along with the rest of the church building, by bombing during World War II. Only the historic interior furnishings were saved. It was not until 1963 that St. James' re-emerged, built to the medieval design, albeit with a modern spire.

== Notable features ==
The building sits a few metres east of the 10th meridian east longitude, which runs through the city centre.

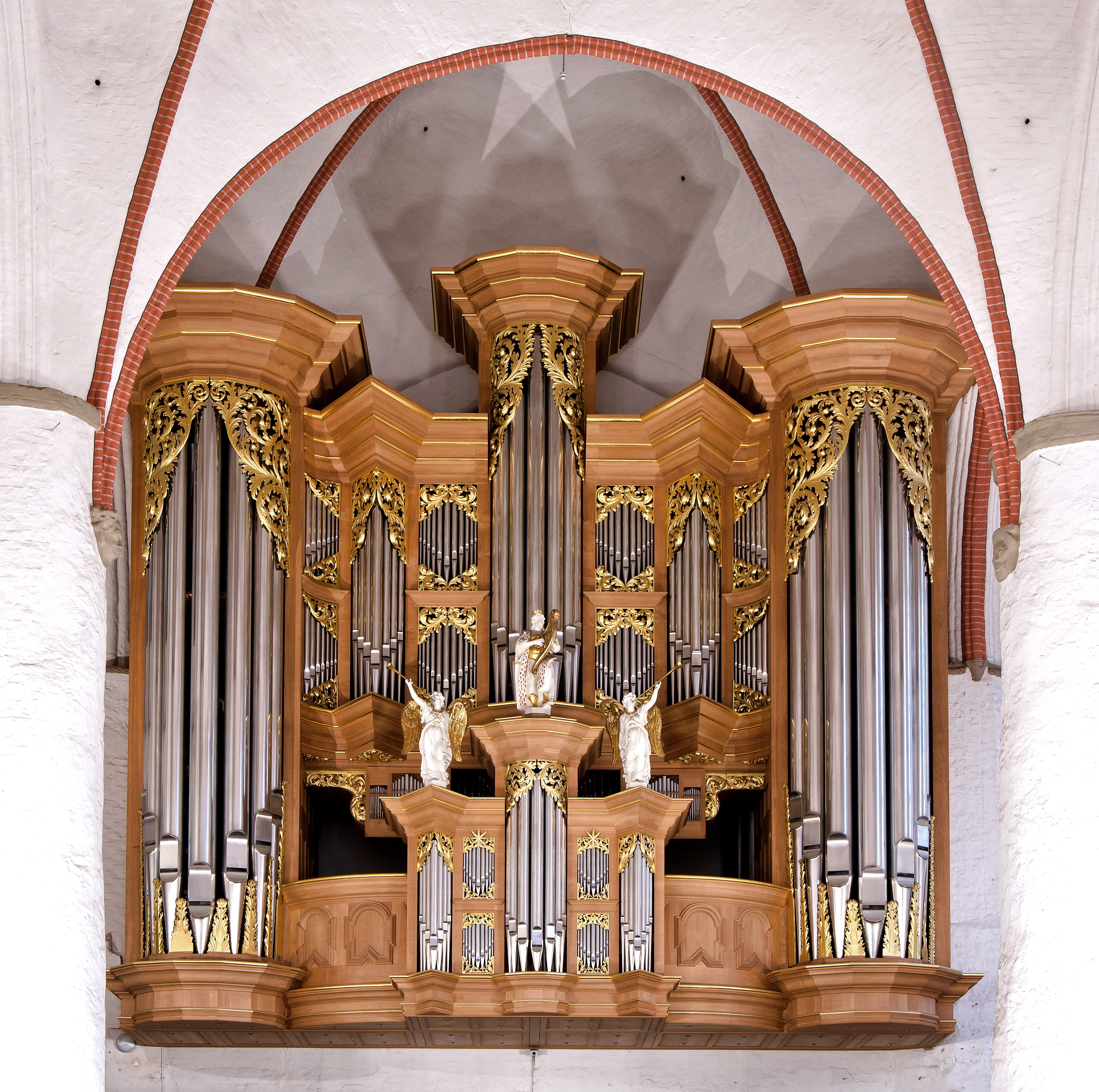
The Arp Schnitger Organ

The famous Arp Schnitger organ of 1693 in the west gallery, with 60 registers and around 4,000 pipes, is the largest baroque organ in Northern Europe. From 1989 to 1993, the organ was completely restored, and since its rededication at Easter 1993 it can be heard every Sunday during services.

The 34 pictures in the organ gallery are the works of Otto Wagenfeldt and Joachim Lundt. They were created to portray the Bible in illustrations which everyone could appreciate and understand.

St. James' has three medieval altars: the Holy Trinity Altar in the Main Choir (c. 1518), the St. Peter Altar in the first south nave (1508), and the St. Luke Altar in the second south nave (1500) that originally comes from the Hamburg Cathedral. The St. Luke Altar was built by the former Guild of St. Luke. All three were built originally to serve as Roman Catholic altars.

Also worthy of notice is the Ministers' Room, which originally served as a library. Since 1543, it has been the collection room of the Cathedral ministers, and was remodelled in 1710. The ceiling murals, with their civic virtues, show the importance of maintaining parish to the city regiment. They were painted, like the landscape paintings on the wall, by Johann Moritz Riesenberger. Coats of arms on the walls name the pastors, vicars, and jurors who have served the parish since the sixteenth century.

== Windows ==
The stained-glass windows are the work of Charles Crodel, who also created the windows of St. Matthew's Church in Winterhude and those of St. Mary's Church in Fuhlsbüttel.

The windows depict in the main important events in the ecclesiastical year viz. Annunciation, Christmas, Passion, Good Friday, Easter, Pentecost.

== Burials ==
- Matthias Weckmann
