= St. Mary's Church, Fuhlsbüttel, Hamburg =

St. Mary's Church
- Kirche St. Marien
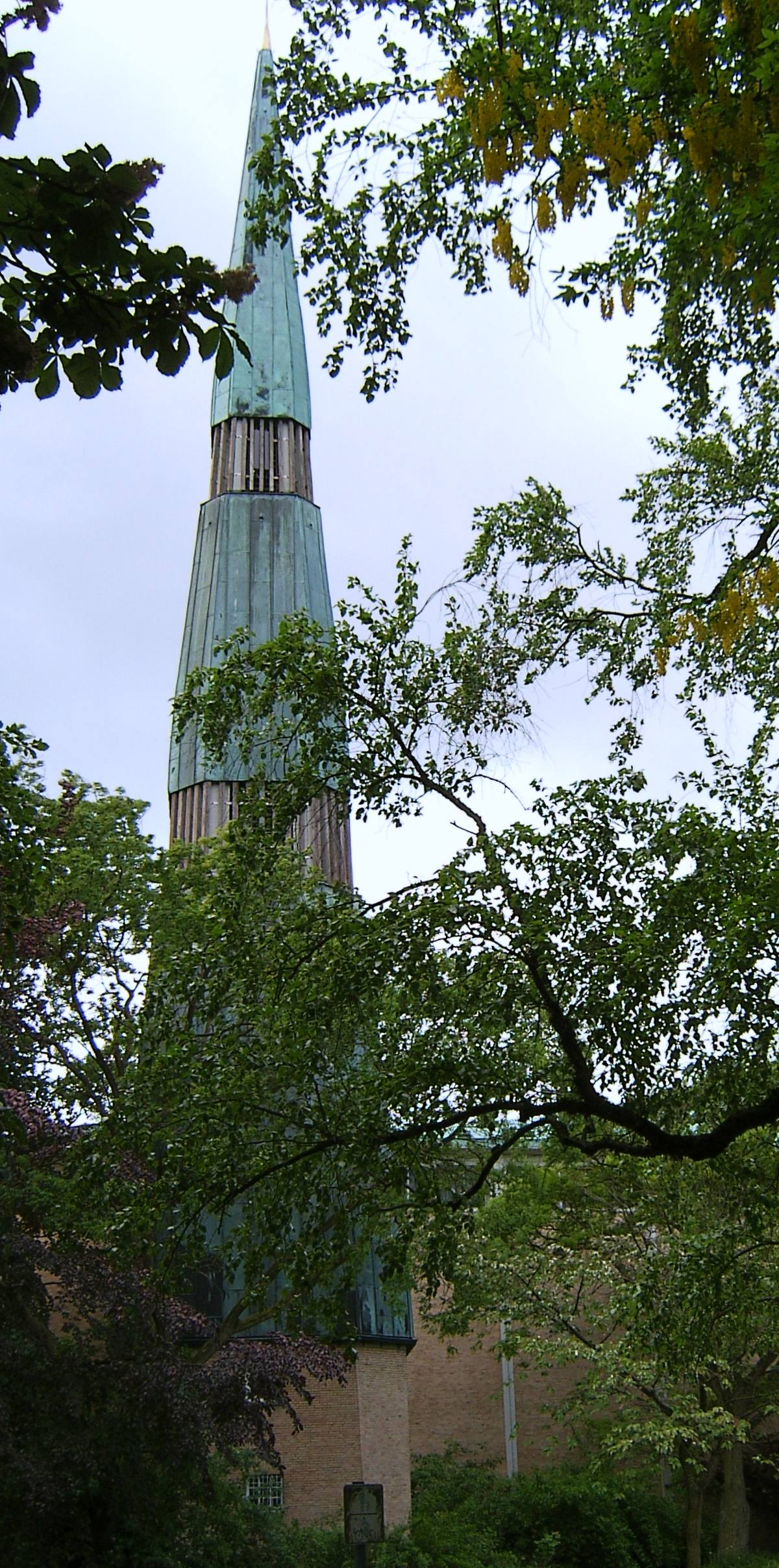
- Steeple of St. Mary's Church

- Shown within Hamburg St. Mary's Church, Fuhlsbüttel, Hamburg (Germany)

General information
- Type: Lutheran church
- Location: Hamburg, Germany, Am Hasenberge 44, 22337 Hamburg
- Coordinates: 53.622222°N 10.026944°E
- Inaugurated: 1960

St. Mary's Church (Kirchengemeinde St. Marien) is a Lutheran church in the Fuhlsbüttel quarter of Hamburg. It was designed by local architects Bernhard Hopp and Rudolf Jäger.

The church was dedicated on February 14, 1960. The twelve small stained-glass windows in the choir loft were made by Charles Crodel, who also created the windows for the main church of St. James's and the parish church of St. Matthew's in the quarter of Winterhude.
