= Fuhlsbüttel =

- Quarter of Hamburg
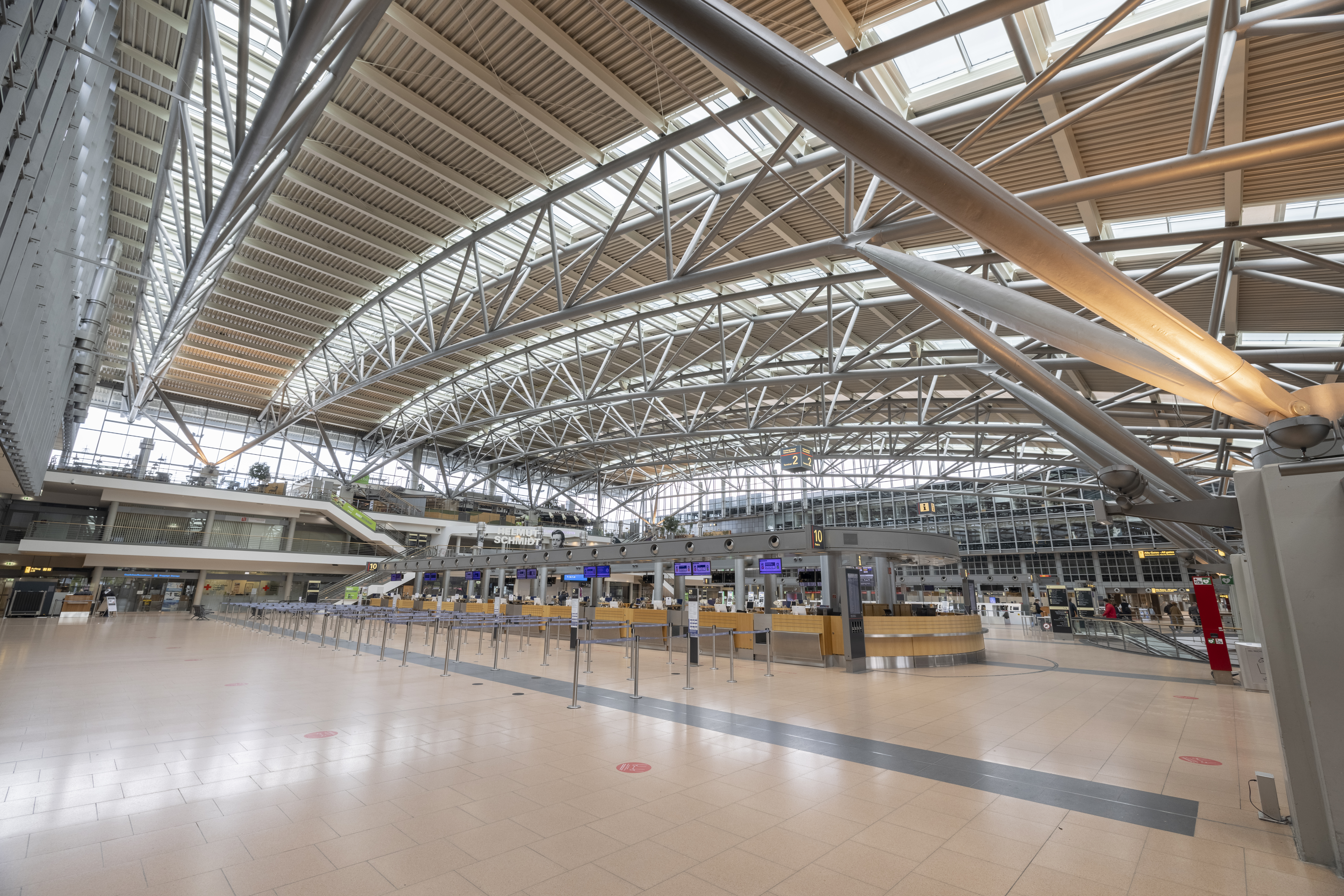
- Hamburg Airport Terminal 2

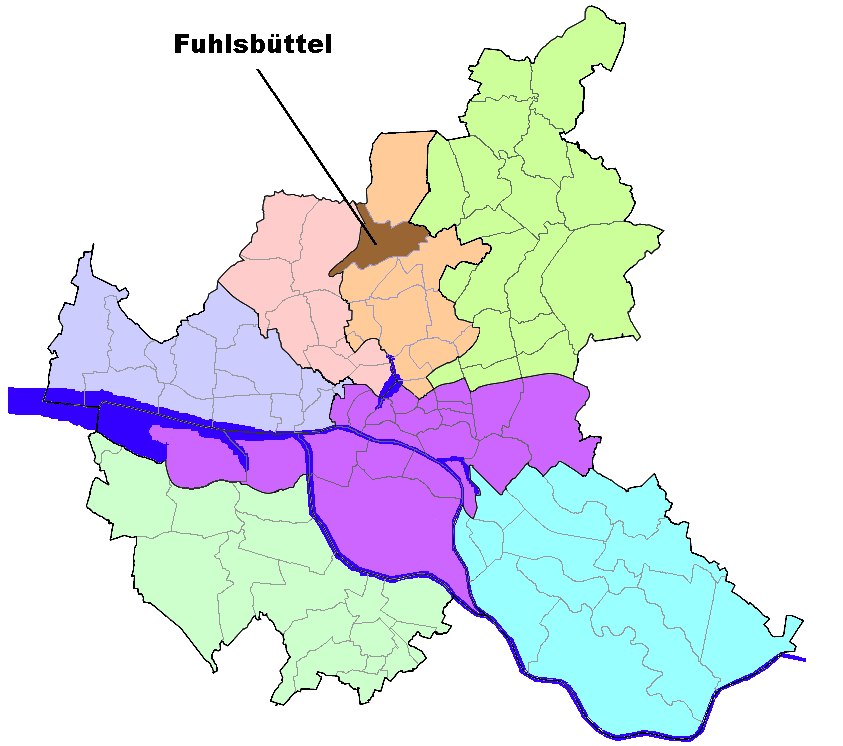
- Location of Fuhlsbüttel in the city of Hamburg
- Interactive map of Fuhlsbüttel
- Location within Germany Location within Hamburg
- Coordinates: 53°38′6″N 10°0′58″E
- Country: Germany
- State: Hamburg
- City: Hamburg
- Borough: Hamburg-Nord

Area
  - Total: 6.6 km^{2} (2.5 sq mi)

Population (2024-12-31)
  - Total: 13,984
  - Density: 2,100/km^{2} (5,500/sq mi)
- Time zone: UTC+01:00 (CET)
  - Summer (DST): UTC+02:00 (CEST)
- Dialling codes: 040
- Vehicle registration: HH

Fuhlsbüttel (German pronunciation: [fuːlsˈbʏtl̩]) is an urban quarter in the north of Hamburg, Germany in the Hamburg-Nord district. It is known as the site of Hamburg's international airport, and as the location of a prison which served as a concentration camp in the Nazi system of repression. As a result of boundary changes, JVA Fuhlsbüttel prison is now in Ohlsdorf, Hamburg.

== History ==
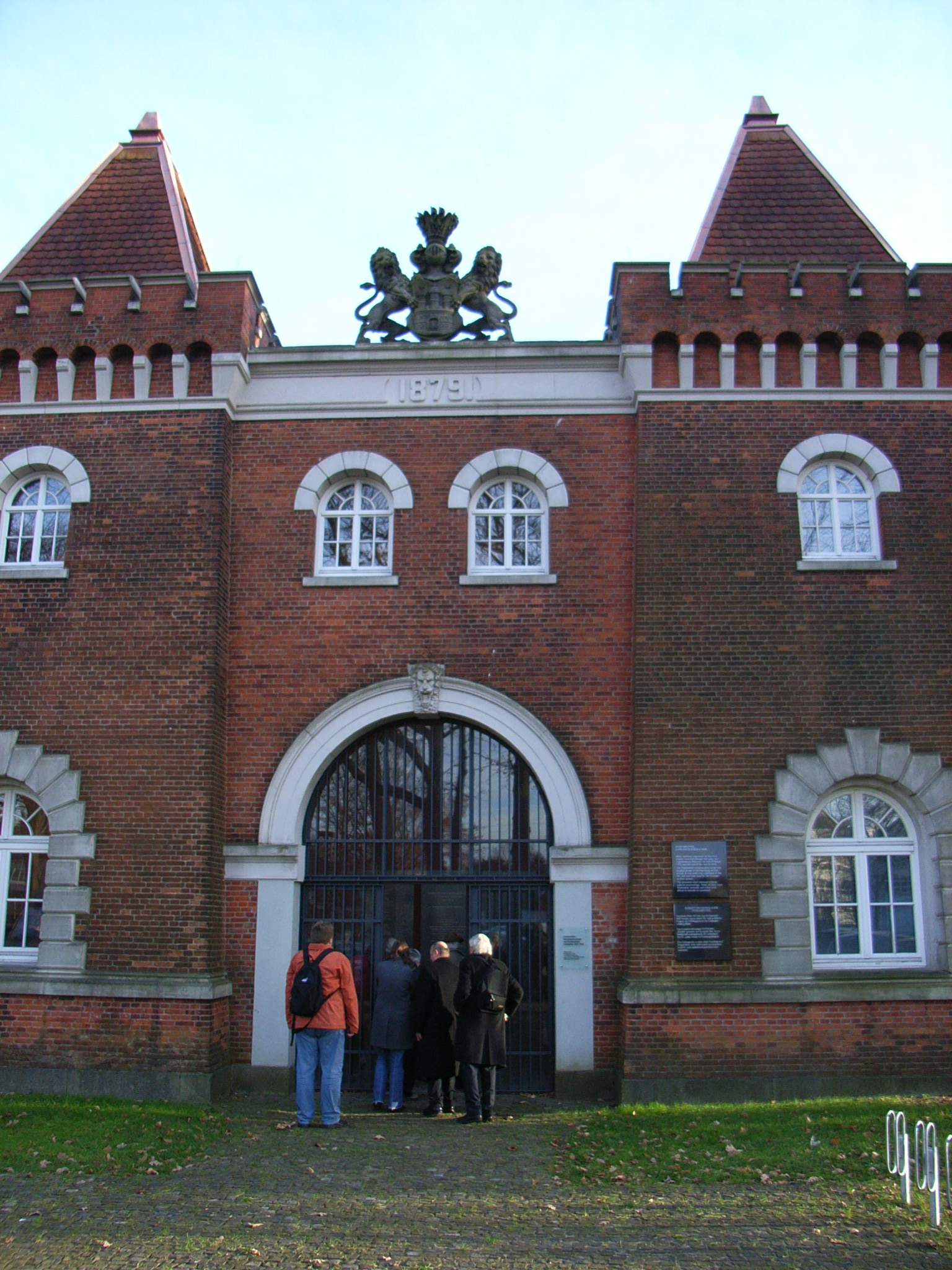
Entrance of the Camp memorial Fuhlsbüttel

In 1871, at the declaration of the German Reich the village of Fuhlsbüttel was given to the State of Hamburg.

=== Fuhlsbüttel airship base ===
From 1912 Luftschiffhafen (Airship Port) Fuhlsbüttel was the first hangar and headquarters of the Marine-Luftschiff-Abteilung (Naval Airship Division) of the German Kaiserliche Marine (Imperial Navy). From there and several new bases recon missions over the North Sea and bombing mission against England were flown during World War I.

=== Fuhlsbüttel concentration camp ===
On 4 September 1933, seven months after Hitler's appointment as Chancellor of Germany, parts of Fuhlsbüttel prison were converted into a concentration camp. It was initially placed under the command of the SA. Most of the inmates were Communists, Social Democrats and other political opponents of Nazism, Jews, Jehovah's Witnesses, Romani, homosexual men and others whom the regime wanted to lock up. In 1936, the Gestapo began running the camp, then called Polizeigefängnis Fuhlsbüttel (police prison). Over 700 people were interned in the camp following Kristallnacht in 1938. Fuhlsbüttel concentration camp was referred to in common parlance as KolaFu (abbreviated from Konzentrationslager Fuhlsbüttel) and became a synonym for oppression and death through hard labor. Fuhlsbüttel was often an initial point of incarceration for prisoners who were sent on to other camps such as Buchenwald, Esterwegen, Neuengamme, Ravensbrück or Sachsenhausen. The camp was liberated on 3 May 1945, by which time over 250 people had been murdered there, though hundreds more had set out on a forced march to the Neuengamme camps south and southeast of Hamburg on 11 April. Many inmates on this death-march fell by the roadside through exhaustion, some shot by SS Guards.

There is a memorial for the camp nearby. A famous political prisoner held at the camp was First World War veteran – turned pacifist – Kapitänleutnant Hellmuth von Mücke. Women were also held at the camp, including Mary Pünjer, who was accused of lesbianism. In 1933 and 1934, Jan Valtin was held at the camp. French-Jewish memoirist and novelist, Maurice Sachs, was held here and was one of those who collapsed on the third day of the march, 14 April, and received a bullet to the back of his neck.

== Geography ==
In 2006 according to the statistical office of Hamburg and Schleswig-Holstein, the quarter Fuhlsbüttel has a total area of 6.6 square kilometres (3 sq mi).

=== Climate ===
Fuhlsbuettel has a typical oceanic climate (Köppen: Cfb).

Climate data for Hamburg-Fuhlsbuttel (Hamburg Airport), elevation: 15 m, 1961-1990 normals and extremes
Month	Jan	Feb	Mar	Apr	May	Jun	Jul	Aug	Sep	Oct	Nov	Dec	Year
Record high °C (°F)	12.8 (55.0)	16.7 (62.1)	23.0 (73.4)	29.7 (85.5)	29.2 (84.6)	32.7 (90.9)	33.2 (91.8)	34.8 (94.6)	30.3 (86.5)	24.0 (75.2)	20.2 (68.4)	15.7 (60.3)	34.8 (94.6)
Mean daily maximum °C (°F)	2.7 (36.9)	3.8 (38.8)	7.2 (45.0)	11.9 (53.4)	17.0 (62.6)	20.2 (68.4)	21.4 (70.5)	21.6 (70.9)	18.0 (64.4)	13.3 (55.9)	7.6 (45.7)	4.0 (39.2)	12.4 (54.3)
Daily mean °C (°F)	0.5 (32.9)	1.1 (34.0)	3.7 (38.7)	7.3 (45.1)	12.2 (54.0)	15.5 (59.9)	16.8 (62.2)	16.6 (61.9)	13.5 (56.3)	9.7 (49.5)	5.1 (41.2)	1.9 (35.4)	8.7 (47.6)
Mean daily minimum °C (°F)	−2.2 (28.0)	−1.8 (28.8)	0.4 (32.7)	3.0 (37.4)	7.2 (45.0)	10.4 (50.7)	12.2 (54.0)	11.9 (53.4)	9.4 (48.9)	6.3 (43.3)	2.5 (36.5)	−0.7 (30.7)	4.9 (40.8)
Record low °C (°F)	−20.8 (−5.4)	−18.7 (−1.7)	−13.8 (7.2)	−6.5 (20.3)	−2.2 (28.0)	0.6 (33.1)	4.2 (39.6)	1.8 (35.2)	−0.6 (30.9)	−3.3 (26.1)	−15.4 (4.3)	−18.5 (−1.3)	−20.8 (−5.4)
Average precipitation mm (inches)	61.0 (2.40)	41.0 (1.61)	56.0 (2.20)	51.0 (2.01)	57.0 (2.24)	74.0 (2.91)	82.0 (3.23)	70.0 (2.76)	70.0 (2.76)	63.0 (2.48)	71.0 (2.80)	72.0 (2.83)	768 (30.23)
Average precipitation days (≥ 1.0 mm)	12.0	9.0	11.0	10.0	10.0	11.0	12.0	11.0	11.0	10.0	12.0	12.0	131
Mean monthly sunshine hours	42.2	67.0	104.7	160.7	216.8	221.8	206.7	207.3	141.1	100.7	53.0	35.2	1,557.2
Source: NOAA View climate chart 1986-2016 or 1960-1990

== Demographics ==
As of 2006, 11,890 people were living in the Fuhlsbüttel quarter. The population density was 1,806/km^{2} (4,678/sq mi). 14.6% were children under the age of 18, and 20.5% were 65 years of age or older. 9.7% were immigrants. 508 people were registered as unemployed. In 1999 there were 6,768 households and 49.7% of all households were made up of individuals.

According to the Department of Motor Vehicles (Kraftfahrt-Bundesamt), 5,004 private vehicles were registered in the Fuhlsbüttel quarter (425 vehicles/1,000 people).

There were two elementary schools and one secondary school in the Fuhlsbüttel quarter and 26 physicians in private practice and five pharmacies.

== Politics ==
These are the results of Fuhlsbüttel in the Hamburg state election:

Election	SPD	Greens	CDU	Left	AfD	FDP	Others
2020	39,9 %	25,7 %	9,4 %	8,1 %	5,6 %	5,1 %	6,2 %
2015	49,3 %	10,8 %	16,0 %	7,2 %	6,1 %	7,0 %	3,6 %
2011	53,0 %	9,8 %	20,4 %	5,5 %	–	7,0 %	4,3 %
2008	34,1 %	9,7 %	43,9 %	5,8 %	–	4,5 %	2,0 %
2004	30,3 %	11,0 %	49,5 %	–	–	2,9 %	6,3 %
2001	37,5 %	8,5 %	26,3 %	0,5	–	5,2 %	24,0 %

== Transport ==
Fuhlsbüttel is served by the Hamburg U-Bahn (underground) line U1, with two stations, Fuhlsbüttel and Fuhlsbüttel Nord (formerly called Flughafenstraße).

Since December 2008, Fuhlsbüttel has also been served by the Hamburg S-Bahn S1 with the Hamburg Airport station.

== Notable buildings ==
- St. Marien Lutheran Church
