= Religious views of Adolf Hitler =

The religious beliefs of Adolf Hitler, the dictator of Nazi Germany from 1933 to 1945, have been a matter of debate. His opinions regarding religious matters changed considerably over time. During the beginning of his political career, Hitler publicly expressed favorable opinions towards traditional Christian ideals, but later deviated from them. Most historians describe his later posture as adversarial to organized Christianity and to established Christian denominations. He also staunchly criticized atheism.

Hitler was born to a practicing Catholic mother, Klara Hitler, and was baptized in the Roman Catholic Church; his father, Alois Hitler, was a free-thinker and skeptical of the Catholic Church. In 1904, he was confirmed at the Roman Catholic Cathedral in Linz, Austria, where the family lived. (Note: Bullock) According to John Willard Toland, witnesses indicate that Hitler's confirmation sponsor had to "drag the words out of him ... almost as though the whole confirmation was repugnant to him". Toland offers the opinion that Hitler "carried within him its teaching that the Jew was the killer of God. The extermination, therefore, could be done without a twinge of conscience since he was merely acting as the avenging hand of God".

Toland is wrong with regard to the official teaching of the Church, since during this period, the church already taught that the Jews were not collectively (or rather, exclusively) responsible for deicide, and that instead all human beings of a sinful fomes peccati were responsible for the death of their Lord and Saviour, especially—and perhaps ironically—the Catholic Church itself (Catechism of Trent).

Michael Rissmann notes that, according to several witnesses who lived with Hitler in a men's home in Vienna, he never again attended Mass or received the sacraments after leaving home at 18 years old.

After becoming absolute dictator of Germany, Hitler in December 1934 was reported by newspapers declaring that National Socialism was "based on positive Christianity. This comprises positive Catholicism and positive Protestantism. The essential element of positive Christianity is faith, coupled with Christian neighborly love."

Hitler seemingly praised Islam during several talks with intimate political and military allies, describing Islam as a religion of warriors.

In a speech in 1932, Hitler declared himself "not a Catholic and not a Protestant, but a German Christian". The German Christians were a Protestant group that supported Nazi ideology. Both Hitler and the Nazi Party promoted "nondenominational" positive Christianity, a movement which rejected most traditional Christian doctrines such as the divinity of Jesus, supernatural miracles as well as Jewish elements such as the Old Testament. In one widely-quoted remark, Hitler described Jesus as an "Aryan fighter" who struggled against "the power and pretensions of the corrupt Pharisees" and against Jewish materialism. Hitler spoke often of Protestantism and Lutheranism, stating, "Through me the Evangelical Protestant Church could become the established church, as in England", and that the "great reformer" Martin Luther "has the merit of rising against the Pope and the Catholic Church".

In the field of policy, the Nazis applied the practice of Gleichschaltung ('coordination') to the disparate Christian churches in Germany. Within months of coming to power, Hitler's régime launched an effort toward coordination of German Protestants into a joint Protestant Reich Church, and also moved early to eliminate political Catholicism. Hitler agreed to his 1933 Reich concordat with the Vatican, but then routinely ignored it, and permitted persecutions of the Catholic Church.

Several historians have insisted that Hitler and his inner circle were influenced by other religions. In a eulogy for a friend, Hitler called on him to enter Valhalla but he later stated that it would be foolish to re-establish the worship of Odin (or Wotan) within Germanic paganism. Most historians argue he was prepared to delay conflicts for political reasons and that he had long-term intentions to eliminate Christianity in Germany, or at least to reform it to suit a Nazi outlook.

== Historiography ==
Alan Bullock wrote that Hitler had been raised Catholic, but, though impressed by its organizational powers, repudiated Christianity on what he considered to be rational and moral grounds. Bullock wrote that Hitler believed neither in "God nor conscience", but found both "justification and absolution" in a view of himself echoing Hegel's view that heroes were above conventional morality, and that the role of "world-historical individuals" as the agents by which the "Will of the World Spirit", the plan of Providence is carried out. Following his early military successes, Hitler "abandoned himself entirely to megalomania" and the "sin of hubris", an exaggerated self-pride, believing himself to be more than a man. Once the war was over, wrote Bullock, Hitler wanted to root out and destroy the influence of the churches, though until then he would be circumspect for political reasons:

In Hitler's eyes, Christianity was a religion fit only for slaves; he detested its ethics in particular. Its teaching, he declared, was a rebellion against the natural law of selection by struggle and the survival of the fittest.

— Alan Bullock, Hitler: A Study in Tyranny

At the turn of the century, leading Hitler expert Ian Kershaw wrote an influential biography of Hitler which used new sources to expound on Hitler's religious views. He concluded that Hitler was spiritual, but nevertheless critical of the churches:

...making the German Army "into the first army in the world, in training, in the raising of units, in armaments, and, above all, in spiritual education (in der geistigen Erziehung)" was vital. If this did not happen, then "Germany will be lost," [Hitler] declared.

...

However much Hitler on some occasions claimed to want a respite in the conflict [with the churches], his own inflammatory comments gave his underlings all the license they needed to turn up the heat on the "Church Struggle", confident that they were working towards the Fuhrer...Hitler's impatience with the churches prompted frequent outbursts of hostility. In early 1937, he was declaring that "Christianity was ripe for destruction" (Untergang), and that the churches must therefore yield to the "primacy of the state", railing against "the most horrible institution imaginable"

British historian Richard J. Evans, who writes primarily on Nazi Germany and World War II, noted Hitler claiming that Nazism is founded on science: "Science, he declared, would easily destroy the last remaining vestiges of superstition' Germany could not tolerate the intervention of foreign influences such as the Pope and 'Priests', he said, were 'black bugs', 'abortions in black cassocks'."

British historian Richard Overy, biographer of Hitler, sees Hitler as having been a skeptic of religion: "Both Stalin and Hitler wanted a neutered religion, subservient to the state, while the slow programme of scientific revelation destroyed the foundation of religious myth." Overy writes of Hitler as skeptical of all religious belief, but politically prudent enough not to "trumpet his scientific views publicly", partly in order to maintain the distinction between his own movement and the godlessness of Soviet Communism. In 2004, he wrote:

He was not a practising Christian but had somehow succeeded in masking his own religious skepticism from millions of German voters. Though Hitler has often been portrayed as a neo-pagan, or the centrepiece of a political religion in which he played the Godhead, his views had much more in common with the revolutionary iconoclasm of the Bolshevik enemy. His few private remarks on Christianity betray a profound contempt and indifference ... Hitler believed that all religions were now "decadent"; in Europe it was the "collapse of Christianity that we are now experiencing". The reason for the crisis was science. Hitler, like Stalin, took a very modern view of the incompatibility of religious and scientific explanation.

Historian Percy Ernst Schramm describes Hitler's personal religious creed, after his rejection of the Christian beliefs of his youth, as "a variant of the monism so common before the First World War". According to Schramm, these views were indirectly influenced by the work of Ernst Haeckel and his disciple, Wilhelm Bölsche. Schramm quotes Dr. Hanskarl von Hasselbach, one of Hitler's personal physicians, as saying that Hitler was a "religious person, or at least one who was struggling with religious clarity". According to von Hasselbach, Hitler did not share Martin Bormann's conception that Nazi ceremonies could become a substitute for church ceremonies, and was aware of the religious needs of the masses. "He went on for hours discussing the possibility of bridging the confessional division of the German people and helping them find a religion appropriate to their character and modern man's understanding of the world."

Hitler's personal conception of God was as "Providence". For instance, when he survived the assassination attempt of July 20, 1944, he ascribed it to Providence saving him to pursue his tasks. In fact, as time went on, Hitler's conception of Providence became more and more intertwined with his belief in his own inability to make an error of judgment. Alfred Jodl stated at Nuremberg that Hitler had "an almost mystical conviction of his infallibility as leader of the nation and of the war". Another of his physicians, Dr. Karl Brandt, said that Hitler saw himself as a "tool of Providence. He was ... consumed by the desire to give the German people everything and to help them out of their distress. He was possessed by the thought that this was his task and that only he could fulfill it."

BBC historian Laurence Rees characterises Hitler's relationship to religion as one of opportunism and pragmatism: "his relationship in public to Christianity – indeed his relationship to religion in general – was opportunistic. There is no evidence that Hitler himself, in his personal life, ever expressed any individual belief in the basic tenets of the Christian church". Considering the religious allusions found in Mein Kampf, Rees writes that "the most coherent reading" of the book is that Hitler was prepared to believe in an initial creator God, but did "not accept the conventional Christian vision of heaven and hell, nor the survival of an individual 'soul'."

Max Domarus has written that Hitler replaced belief in the Abrahamic God with belief in a peculiarly German "god". He promoted the idea of this god as the creator of Germany, but Hitler "was not a Christian in any accepted meaning of that word." Domarus writes that Hitler neither believed in organized religion nor saw himself as a religious reformer. Hitler had fully discarded belief in the Judeo-Christian conception of God by 1937, writes Domarus, but continued to use the word "God" in speeches – but it was not the God "who has been worshiped for millennia", but a new and peculiarly German "god" who "let iron grow". Thus Hitler told the British journalist Ward Price in 1937: "I believe in God, and I am convinced that He will not desert 67 million Germans who have worked so hard to regain their rightful position in the world." Although Hitler did not "abide by its commandments", Domarus believed that he retained elements of the Catholic thinking of his upbringing even into the initial years of his rule: "As late as 1933, he still described himself publicly as a Catholic. Only the spreading poison of his lust for power and self idolatry finally crowded out the memories of childhood beliefs and in 1937 he jettisoned the last of his personal religious convictions, declaring to comrades, 'Now I feel as fresh as a colt in the pasture'".

Author Konrad Heiden has quoted Hitler as stating, "We do not want any other god than Germany itself. It is essential to have fanatical faith and hope and love in and for Germany." Derek Hastings considers it "eminently plausible" that Hitler was a believing Catholic as late as his trial in 1924, but writes that "there is little doubt that Hitler was a staunch opponent of Christianity throughout the duration of the Third Reich".

The biographer John Toland, recounts that in the aftermath of an attempted assassination in 1939, Hitler told dinner guests that Pope Pius XII would rather have seen the "plot succeed" and "was no friend of mine", but also writes that in 1941 Hitler was still "a member in good standing of the Church of Rome despite his detestation of its hierarchy" According to Guenter Lewy, Hitler was not excommunicated from the Catholic Church prior to his death. Although he had received the Catholic sacraments of Baptism as an infant, and Confirmation later in his youth, there is little evidence he considered himself subject to the teaching of the Church from adolescence onward, whatever cultural affiliation he claimed.

Samuel Koehne of Deakin University wrote in 2012: "Was Hitler an atheist? Probably not. But it remains very difficult to ascertain his personal religious beliefs, and the debate rages on." While Hitler was emphatically not "Christian" by the traditional or orthodox notion of the term, he did speak of a deity whose work was nature and natural laws, "conflating God and nature to the extent that they became one and the same thing" and that "For this reason, some recent works have argued Hitler was a Deist". In his writings on Hitler's recurrent religious images and symbols, Kenneth Burke concluded that "Hitler's modes of thought are nothing more than perverted or caricatured forms of religious thought".

Richard Steigmann-Gall finds Hitler a Christian. He wrote in 2003 that even after Hitler's rupture with institutional Christianity (which he dated to around 1937), he sees evidence that he continued to hold Jesus in high esteem, and never directed his attacks on Jesus himself. Use of the term "positive Christianity" in the Nazi Party Program of the 1920s is commonly regarded as a tactical measure, but Steigmann-Gall believes it may have had an "inner logic" and been "more than a political ploy". He considers that Hitler was Christian at least until the early 1930s, and that he saw Jesus as an Aryan opponent of the Jews.

== Hitler's contemporaries on his religious beliefs ==
=== Albert Speer on Hitler's religious beliefs ===
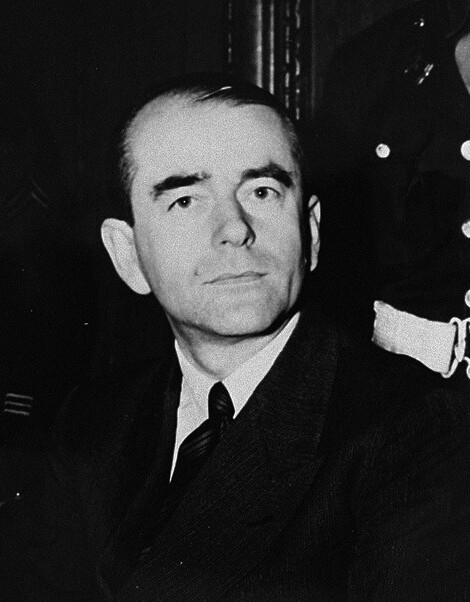
Albert Speer, c. 1946

In his memoirs, Hitler's confidant, personal architect, and Minister of Armaments Albert Speer, wrote: "Amid his political associates in Berlin, Hitler made harsh pronouncements against the church", yet "conceived of the church as an instrument that could be useful to him":

Around 1937, when Hitler heard that at the instigation of the party and the SS vast numbers of his followers had left the church because it was obstinately opposing his plans, he nevertheless ordered his chief associates, above all Goering and Goebbels, to remain members of the church. He too would remain a member of the Catholic Church he said, although he had no real attachment to it. And in fact he remained in the church until his suicide.

— Extract from Inside the Third Reich, Speer's memoir

The Goebbels Diaries also remark on this policy. Goebbels wrote on 29 April 1941 that though Hitler was "a fierce opponent" of the Vatican and Christianity, "he forbids me to leave the church. For tactical reasons."

According to Speer, Hitler's private secretary, Martin Bormann, relished recording any harsh pronouncements by Hitler against the church. Speer considered Bormann to be the driving force behind the regime's campaign against the churches. Speer thought that Hitler approved of Bormann's aims, but was more pragmatic and wanted to "postpone this problem to a more favourable time":

"Once I have settled my other problem," [Hitler] occasionally declared, "I'll have my reckoning with the church. I'll have it reeling on the ropes." But Bormann did not want this reckoning postponed ... he would take out a document from his pocket and begin reading passages from a defiant sermon or pastoral letter. Frequently Hitler would become so worked up ... and vowed to punish the offending clergyman eventually ... That he could not immediately retaliate raised him to a white heat ...

— Extract from Inside the Third Reich, the memoir of Albert Speer

Hitler, wrote Speer, viewed Christianity as the wrong religion for the "Germanic temperament": Speer wrote that Hitler would say: "You see, it's been our misfortune to have the wrong religion. Why didn't we have the religion of the Japanese, who regard sacrifice for the fatherland as the highest good? The Mohameddan religion too would have been much more compatible to us than Christianity. Why did it have to be Christianity with its meekness and flabbiness?" Speer also wrote of observing in Hitler "quite a few examples", and that he held a negative view toward Himmler and Rosenberg's mystical notions.

=== Martin Bormann on Hitler's religious beliefs ===
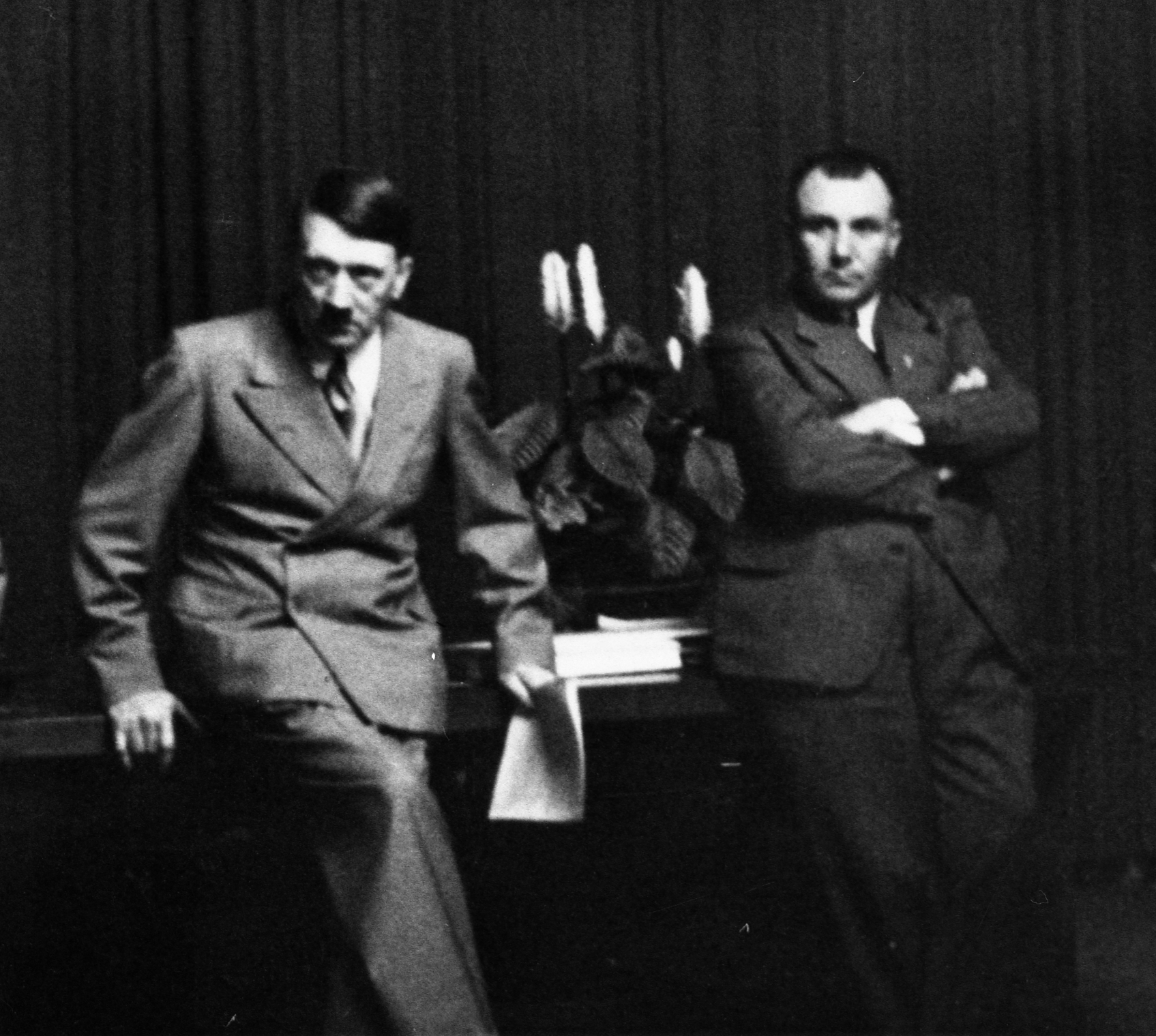
Hitler (left) with Martin Bormann (right) in 1939

Martin Bormann, who was serving as Hitler's private secretary, persuaded Hitler to allow a team of specially picked officers to record in shorthand his private conversations for posterity. Between 1941 and 1944, Hitler's words were recorded in transcripts now known as Hitler's Table Talk. The transcripts concern not only Hitler's views on war and foreign affairs, but also his characteristic attitudes on religion, culture, philosophy, personal aspirations, and his feelings towards his enemies and friends. Speer noted in his memoirs that Bormann relished recording any harsh pronouncements made by Hitler against the church: "there was hardly anything he wrote down more eagerly than deprecating comments on the church". Within the transcripts, Hitler speaks of Christianity as "absurdity" and "humbug" founded on "lies" with which he could "never come personally to terms."

The widespread consensus among historians is that the views expressed in Hugh Trevor-Roper's translation of Table Talk, are credible and reliable, although as with all historical sources, a high level of critical awareness about its origins and purpose are advisable. The remarks from Table Talk accepted as genuine include such quotes as "Christianity is the prototype of Bolshevism: the mobilization by the Jew of the masses of slaves with the object of undermining society." Alan Bullock's seminal biography Hitler: A Study in Tyranny quotes Hitler as saying, "Taken to its logical extreme, Christianity would mean the systematic cultivation of the human failure"; found also in Table Talk, and repeats other views appearing in Table Talk such as: the teachings of Christianity are a rebellion against the natural law of selection by struggle and survival of the fittest.

Michael Burleigh contrasted Hitler's public pronouncements on Christianity with those in Table Talk, suggesting that Hitler's real religious views were "a mixture of materialist biology, a faux-Nietzschean contempt for core, as distinct from secondary, Christian values, and a visceral anti-clericalism." Richard Evans also reiterated the view that Nazism was secular, scientific and anti-religious in outlook in the last volume of his trilogy on Nazi Germany: "Hitler's hostility to Christianity reached new heights, or depths, during the war". Hitler's Table Talk has the dictator often voicing stridently negative views of Christianity, such as: "The heaviest blow that ever struck humanity was the coming of Christianity. Bolshevism is Christianity's illegitimate child. Both are inventions of the Jew. The deliberate lie in the matter of religion was introduced into the world by Christianity."

Transcripts in Table Talk have Hitler favoring science over Christianity. On 14 October 1941, in an entry concerning the fate of Christianity, Hitler says: "Science cannot lie, for it's always striving, according to the momentary state of knowledge, to deduce what is true. When it makes a mistake, it does so in good faith. It's Christianity that's the liar. It's in perpetual conflict with itself." Religion will crumble before scientific advances, says Hitler: "The dogma of Christianity gets worn away before the advances of science. Religion will have to make more and more concessions. Gradually the myths crumble. All that's left is to prove that in nature there is no frontier between the organic and the inorganic. When understanding of the universe has become widespread, when the majority of men know that the stars are not sources of light but worlds, perhaps inhabited worlds like ours, then the Christian doctrine will be convicted of absurdity."

Hitler feared the collapse of the pact with churches would lead to "the state of the animal" — atheism. "I'm convinced that any pact with the Church can offer only a provisional benefit, for sooner or later the scientific spirit will disclose the harmful character of such a compromise. Thus the State will have based its existence on a foundation that one day will collapse. An educated man retains the sense of the mysteries of nature and bows before the unknowable. An uneducated man, on the other hand, runs the risk of going over to atheism (which is a return to the state of the animal) as soon as he perceives that the State, in sheer opportunism, is making use of false ideas in the matter of religion, whilst in other fields it bases everything on pure science. That's why I've always kept the Party aloof from religious questions."

According to Table Talk, Hitler believed that Jesus' true Christian teachings had been corrupted by the apostle St Paul, who had transformed them into a kind of Jewish Bolshevism, which Hitler believed preached "the equality of all men amongst themselves, and their obedience to an only god. This is what caused the death of the Roman Empire."

In Table Talk, Hitler praised Julian the Apostate's Against the Galileans, an anti-Christian tract from AD 362, in the entry dated 21 October 1941, stating: "When one thinks of the opinions held concerning Christianity by our best minds a hundred, two hundred years ago, one is ashamed to realise how little we have since evolved. I didn't know that Julian the Apostate had passed judgment with such clear-sightedness on Christianity and Christians. ... Originally, Christianity was merely an incarnation of Bolshevism the destroyer. Nevertheless, the Galilean, who later was called the Christ, intended something quite different. He must be regarded as a popular leader who took up His position against Jewry.... and it's certain that Jesus was not a Jew. The Jews, by the way, regarded Him as the son of a whore—of a whore and a Roman soldier. The decisive falsification of Jesus's doctrine was the work of St. Paul. He gave himself to this work with subtlety and for purposes of personal exploitation. For the Galilean's object was to liberate his country from Jewish oppression. He set Himself against Jewish capitalism, and that's why the Jews liquidated Him. Paul of Tarsus (his name was Saul, before the Road to Damascus) was one of those who persecuted Jesus most savagely."

Richard Carrier made some isolated comparisons of passages from the German, French and English editions of Table Talk, and found in each case that the English edition by Trevor-Roper was a translation of the French edition by Francois Genoud, rather than from the German editions; and also that the French translation contained significant distortions, which generally heightened the impression of Hitler's hatred for Christianity. Carrier concluded that "the Trevor-Roper edition is to be discarded as worthless." However, Carrier found that three German versions "have a common ancestor, which must be the actual bunker notes themselves", and recommended that scholars needed to work directly with the German editions. In his introduction to a 2013 edition of Trevor-Roper's Table Talk, Gerhard Reinberg agreed that the Trevor-Roper edition "derives from Genoud's French edition and not from either of the German texts." After examining Trevor-Roper's personal correspondence and papers, Mikael Nilsson concluded that Trevor-Roper was fully aware of the fact that his edition was based on the French text, but failed to reveal the problems in public.

=== Joseph Goebbels on Hitler's religious beliefs ===
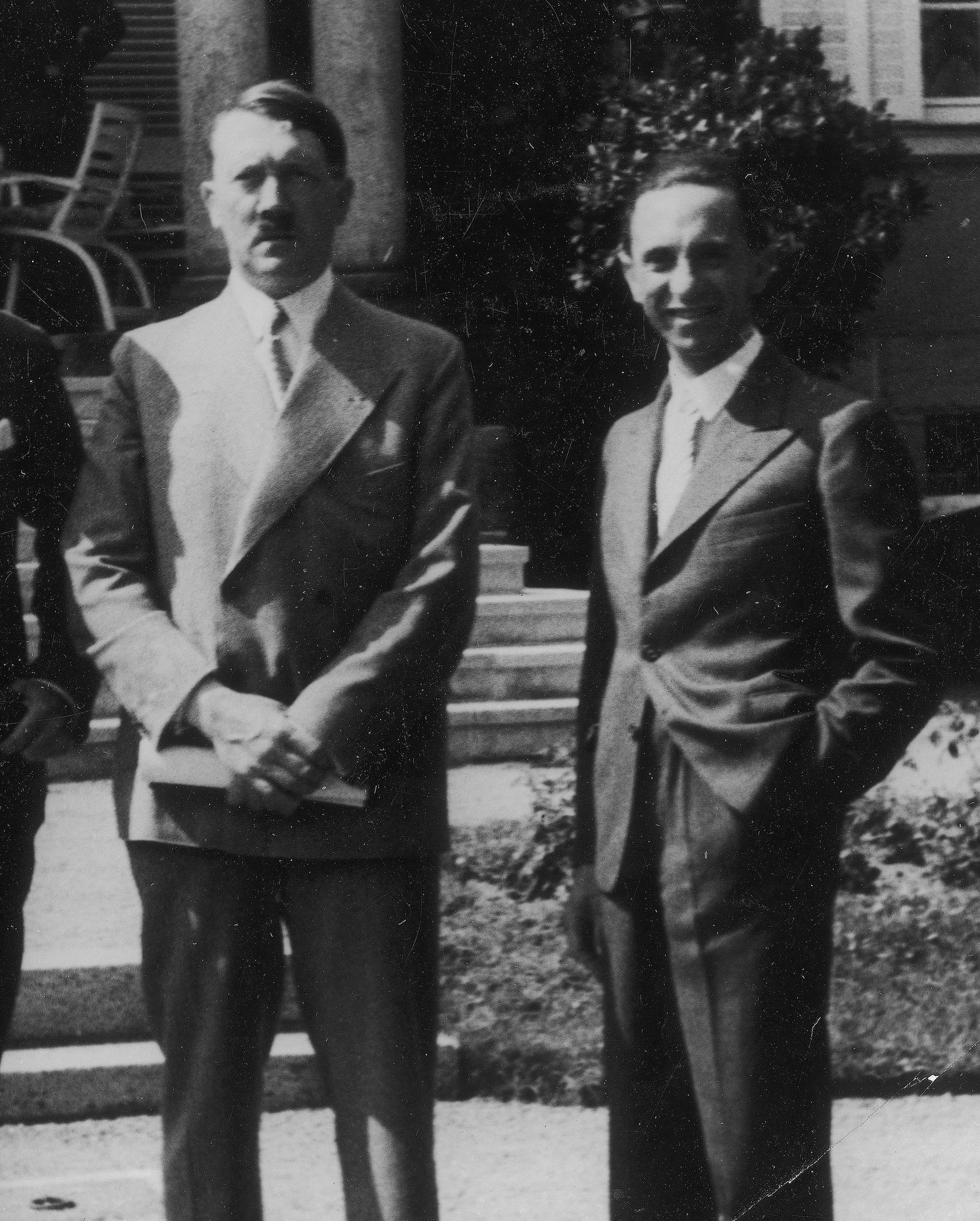
Hitler (left) with Joseph Goebbels (right) in 1934

The Goebbels Diaries, written by Hitler's Propaganda Minister Joseph Goebbels, provide important insights into Hitler's thinking and actions. In a diary entry of 28 December 1939, Goebbels wrote that "the Fuhrer passionately rejects any thought of founding a religion. He has no intention of becoming a priest. His sole exclusive role is that of a politician." In an 8 April 1941 entry, Goebbels wrote "He hates Christianity, because it has crippled all that is noble in humanity."

In 1937, Goebbels noted that Hitler's impatience with the churches "prompted frequent outbursts of hostility. In early 1937 he was declaring that 'Christianity was ripe for destruction', and that the Churches must yield to the "primacy of the state", railing against any compromise with "the most horrible institution imaginable". In his entry for 29 April 1941, Goebbels noted long discussions about the Vatican and Christianity, and wrote: "The Fuhrer is a fierce opponent of all that humbug".

In 1939, Goebbels wrote that the Führer knew that he would "have to get around to a conflict between church and state" but that in the meantime "The best way to deal with the churches is to claim to be a 'positive Christian'."

In another entry, Goebbels wrote that Hitler was "deeply religious but entirely anti-Christian". Goebbels wrote on 29 December 1939:

The Führer is deeply religious, though completely anti-Christian. He views Christianity as a symptom of decay. Rightly so. It is a branch of the Jewish race. This can be seen in the similarity of their religious rites. Both (Judaism and Christianity) have no point of contact to the animal element, and thus, in the end they will be destroyed.

— Goebbels Diaries, 29 December 1939

Goebbels notes in a diary entry in 1939 a conversation in which Hitler had "expressed his revulsion against Christianity. He wished that the time were ripe for him to be able to openly express that. Christianity had corrupted and infected the entire world of antiquity." Hitler, wrote Goebbels, saw the pre-Christian Augustan Age as the high point of history, and could not relate to the Gothic mind nor to "brooding mysticism".

The diaries also report that Hitler believed Jesus "also wanted to act against the Jewish world domination. Jewry had him crucified. But Paul falsified his doctrine and undermined ancient Rome."

=== Ernst Hanfstaengl and Otto Strasser on Hitler's religious beliefs ===
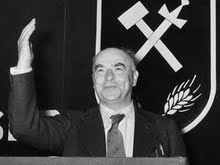
Otto Strasser: German politician and an early member of the Nazi Party.

Otto Strasser was a German politician and an early member of the Nazi Party, he together with his brother Gregor Strasser, was a leading member of the party's left-wing faction. "Despite the fact that Hitler never renounced his membership in the Catholic Church, before he seized power in 1933 and for about two months thereafter", wrote Weikart, during the conversation with his brother in 1920, Strasser stated that he was disappointed with Hitler because:

We are Christians; without Christianity Europe is lost. Hitler is an atheist.

— Otto Strasser

Ernst Hanfstaengl was a German-American businessman and intimate friend of Hitler. He eventually fell out of favour with Hitler, however, and defected from Nazi Germany to the United States. He later described Hitler to be an atheist to all intents and purposes by the time he got to know him:

He was to all intents and purposes an atheist by the time.

— Ernst Hanfstaengl

=== Other sources ===
The Anschluss saw the annexation of Austria by Nazi Germany in early 1938. The Austrian chancellor, Kurt Schuschnigg, had traveled to Germany to meet Hitler, who, according to Schuschnigg's later testimony, went into a threatening rage against the role of Austria in German history, saying, "Every national idea was sabotaged by Austria throughout history; and indeed all this sabotage was the chief activity of the Habsburgs and the Catholic Church." This ended in Hitler's ultimatum to end Austrian independence and hand the nation to the Nazis.

Following the 1944 assassination attempt in the "20 July plot", Hitler credited his survival to fate in a radio broadcast the following day. German deputy press chief Helmut Suendermann declared, "The German people must consider the failure of the attempt on Hitler's life as a sign that Hitler will complete his tasks under the protection of a divine power".

Following a meeting with Hitler, Cardinal Michael von Faulhaber, a man who had "courageously criticized the Nazi attacks on the Catholic Church—went away convinced that Hitler was deeply religious", noted Kershaw. In November 1936 the Roman Catholic prelate met Hitler at Berghof for a three-hour meeting. He left the meeting and wrote "The Reich Chancellor undoubtedly lives in belief in God. He recognises Christianity as the builder of Western culture". Kershaw cites Faulhaber's case as an example of Hitler's ability to "pull the wool over the eyes of even hardened critics", demonstrating Hitler's "evident ability to simulate, even to potentially critical church leaders, an image of a leader keen to uphold and protect Christianity".

Krieger claims that Hitler had abandoned the Catholic Church while Hitler's last secretary asserted that he was not a member of any church. Otto Strasser stated critically of the dictator, "Hitler is an atheist" for his unsettling sympathy to "Rosenberg's paganism."

In his post-war memoirs, under the entry for August 6, 1938, titled 'Church (Question) – Mu(nich)', Gerhard Engel wrote: “He [Hitler] said he was still a member of the Catholic Church and would remain so.” Engel later noted the following under the entry for January 20, 1940, titled 'Relationship to the Church': “‘F. spoke at length again about religious belief and his attitude to the churches. Undoubtedly under sniper fire from B(ormann) and H(immler) a less conciliatory attitude is developing. Whereas in the past he wanted to live and let live, he is now determined to fight the churches. F. literally: ‘The war, here as in many other areas, presents a favourable opportunity to dispose of it (the church question) root and branch.’”

== Public and private evolution of Hitler's beliefs ==
=== Youth ===
Adolf Hitler was raised in a Roman Catholic family in the Austrian monarchy (Roman Catholics were the dominant religious group there). However, reliable historical details on his childhood are scarce. According to Hitler historian Ian Kershaw, the reflections Hitler provided on his own life in Mein Kampf are "inaccurate in detail and coloured in interpretation", while information that was given during the Nazi period is "dubious", as can be the postwar recollections of family and acquaintances.

Hitler was baptised as a Catholic in the same year he was born, 1889. Hitler's father Alois, though nominally a Catholic, was somewhat religiously skeptical and anticlerical, while his mother Klara was a devout practising Catholic. A. N. Wilson wrote: "Much is sometimes made of the Catholic upbringing of Hitler ... it was something to which Hitler himself often made allusion, and he was nearly always violently hostile. 'The biretta! The mere sight of these abortions in cassocks makes me wild!'" Hitler boasted of expressing skepticism to clergyman-teachers when taught religious instruction in school. He attended several primary schools. For six months, the family lived opposite a Benedictine Monastery at Lambach, and on some afternoons, Hitler attended the choir school there. Hitler later wrote in Mein Kampf that at this time he dreamed of one day taking holy orders.

Hitler was confirmed on 22 May 1904. According to Rissmann, as a youth Hitler was influenced by Pan-Germanism and began to reject the Catholic Church, receiving confirmation only unwillingly. Biographer John Toland wrote of the 1904 ceremony at Linz Cathedral that Hitler's confirmation sponsor said he nearly had to "drag the words out of him... almost as though the whole confirmation was repugnant to him". Rissmann notes that, according to several witnesses who lived with Hitler in a men's home in Vienna, Hitler never again attended Mass or received the sacraments after leaving home.

In 1909, Hitler moved to Vienna and according to Alan Bullock his intellectual interests there vacillated and his reading included "Ancient Rome, Eastern religions, Yoga, Occultism, Hypnotism, Astrology, Protestantism, each in turn excited his interest for a moment ... He struck people as unbalanced. He gave rein to his hatreds – against the Jews, the priests, the Social Democrats, the Habsburgs – without restraint".

In Percy Ernst Schramm's "The Anatomy of a Dictator", which was based on an analysis of the transcripts of the "Table Talk" recordings, Hitler is quoted as saying that "after a hard inner struggle" he had freed himself from the religious beliefs of his youth, so that he felt "as fresh as a foal in the pasture".

=== Adulthood and political career ===
==== Public rhetoric and writings about religion ====
Although personally skeptical, Hitler's public relationship to religion was one of opportunistic pragmatism. In religious affairs, he readily adopted a strategy "that suited his immediate political purposes." He typically tailored his message to his audience's perceived sensibilities and Kershaw considers that few people could really claim to "know" Hitler, who was "a very private, even secretive individual", able to deceive "even hardened critics" as to his true beliefs. In private, he scorned Christianity, but when out campaigning for power in Germany, he made statements in favour of the religion.

Hitler's public utterances were peppered with references to "God" and "Spirit". In Hitler and Stalin: Parallel Lives, Bullock wrote that Hitler, like Napoleon before him, frequently employed the language of "divine providence" in defence of his own personal myth, but ultimately shared with the Soviet dictator Joseph Stalin "the same materialist outlook, based on the nineteenth-century rationalists' certainty that the progress of science would destroy all myths and had already proved Christian doctrine to be an absurdity":

Hitler's own myth had to be protected, and this led him, like Napoleon, to speak frequently of Providence, as a necessary if unconscious projection of his sense of destiny which provided him with both justification and absolution. 'The Russians', he remarked on one occasion 'were entitled to attack their priests, but they had no right to assail the idea of a supreme force. It's a fact that we're feeble creatures and that a creative force exists'".

— Excerpt from Hitler and Stalin: Parallel Lives by Alan Bullock

Hitler had an "ability to simulate, even to potentially critical Church leaders, an image of a leader keen to uphold and protect Christianity [from Bolshevism]" wrote Kershaw, which served to deflect direct criticism of him from Church leaders, who instead focused their condemnations on the known "anti-Christian party radicals".

==== Religion in Mein Kampf ====
"The political leader should not estimate the worth of a religion by taking some of its shortcomings into account, but he should ask himself whether there be any practical substitute in a view which is demonstrably better. Until such a substitute be available only fools and criminals would think of abolishing the existing religion.... In this conflict victory will nearly always be on the side of science, even though after a bitter struggle, while religion will suffer heavily in the eyes of those who cannot penetrate beneath the mere superficial aspects of science." — Adolf Hitler, Mein Kampf

Mein Kampf (1924–1925), written while Hitler was in prison after his failed 1923 putsch, contains numerous references to "God", "the Creator", "Providence" and "the Lord".

Laurence Rees described the thrust of the work as "bleak nihilism" revealing a cold universe with no moral structure other than the fight between different people for supremacy: "What's missing from Mein Kampf", wrote Rees – "and this is a fact that has not received the acknowledgement it should – is any emphasis on Christianity" – though Germany, Rees noted, had been Christian for a thousand years. So, concluded Rees, "the most coherent reading of Mein Kampf is that whilst Hitler was prepared to believe in an initial creator God, he did not accept the conventional Christian vision of heaven and hell, nor the survival of an individual "soul" ... we are animals and just like animals we face the choice of destroying or being destroyed."

Paul Berben wrote that insofar as the Christian denominations were concerned, Hitler declared himself to be neutral in Mein Kampf – but argued for clear separation of church and state, and for the church not to concern itself with the earthly life of the people, which must be the domain of the state. According to William Shirer, Hitler "inveighed against political Catholicism in Mein Kampf and attacked the two main Christian churches for their failure to recognise the racial problem", while also warning that no political party could succeed in "producing a religious reformation".

In Mein Kampf, Hitler wrote that Jesus "made no secret of his attitude toward the Jewish people, and when necessary he even took the whip to drive from the temple of the Lord this adversary of all humanity, who then as always saw in religion nothing but an instrument for his business existence. In return, Christ was nailed to the cross."

Hitler wrote of the importance of a definite and uniformly accepted Weltanschauung (world view), and noted that the diminished position of religion in Europe had led to a decline in necessary certainties – "yet this human world of ours would be inconceivable without the practical existence of religious belief". The various substitutes hitherto offered could not "usefully replace the existing denominations".

Examining how to establish a new order, Hitler argued that the greatness of powerful organizations was reliant on intolerance of all others, so that the greatness of Christianity arose from the "unrelenting and fanatical proclamation and defence of its own teaching". Hitler rejected a view that Christianity brought civilization to the Germanic peoples, however: "It is therefore outrageously unjust to speak of the pre-Christian Germans as barbarians who had no civilization. They never have been such." Foreshadowing his conflict with the Catholic Church over euthanasia in Nazi Germany, Hitler wrote that the churches should give up missionary work in Africa, and concentrate on convincing Europeans that it is more pleasing to God if they adopt orphans rather than "give life to a sickly child that will be a cause of suffering and unhappiness to all". The churches should forget about their own differences and focus on the issue of "racial contamination", he declared.

The two Christian denominations look on with indifference at the profanation and destruction of a noble and unique creature who was given to the world as a gift of God's grace. For the future of the world, however, it does not matter which of the two triumphs over the other, the Catholic or the Protestant. But it does matter whether Aryan humanity survives or perishes.

— Hitler, Mein Kampf

When he arrived in Vienna as a young man, Hitler claimed, he was not yet antisemitic: "In the Jew I still saw only a man who was of a different religion, and therefore, on grounds of human tolerance, I was against the idea that he should be attacked because he had a different faith." Hitler was a strong supporter of Austrian politician George Schonerer's pan-Germanic movement which advocated anti-Catholic ideas. Acclaiming Schonerer's anti-Catholic campaign, Hitler wrote:

The root of the whole evil lay, particularly in Schonerer's opinion, in the fact that the directing body of the Catholic Church was not in Germany; and that for this very reason alone it was hostile to the interests of our nationality. ... The attitude of the Pan-German movement toward the Catholic Church was determined far less by its position on science, etc., than by its inadequacy in the championing of German rights and, conversely, its continued aid and comfort to Slavic arrogance and greed. Georg Schonerer was not the man to do things by halves. He took up the struggle toward the Church in the conviction that by it alone he could save the German people.

— Hitler, "Mein Kampf"

Hitler thought that antisemitism based on religious, rather than racial grounds, was a mistake: "The anti-Semitism of the Christian-Socialists was based on religious instead of racial principles." Instead, Hitler argued that Jews should be deplored on the basis of their "race". Outlining a parallel between militantism and Christianity's rise to power as the Roman Empire's official state religion, Hitler wrote:

The individual may establish with pain today that with the appearance of Christianity the first spiritual terror entered into the far freer ancient world, but he will not be able to contest the fact that since then the world has been afflicted and dominated by this coercion, and that coercion is broken only by coercion, and terror only by terror. Only then can a new state of affairs be constructively created. Political parties are inclined to compromises; philosophies never. Political parties even reckon with opponents; philosophies proclaim their infallibility.

Elsewhere in Mein Kampf, Hitler speaks of the "creator of the universe" and "eternal Providence". He also states that the Aryan race was created by God, and that it would be a sin to dilute it through racial intermixing:

The völkisch-minded man, in particular, has the sacred duty, each in his own denomination, of making people stop just talking superficially of God's will, and actually fulfill God's will, and not let God's word be desecrated. For God's will gave men their form, their essence and their abilities. Anyone who destroys His work is declaring war on the Lord's creation, the divine will.

In Mein Kampf, Hitler saw Jesus as against the Jews rather than one of them: "And the founder of Christianity made no secret indeed of his estimation of the Jewish people. When He found it necessary, He drove those enemies of the human race out of the Temple of God."

Derek Hastings writes that, according to Hitler's personal photographer Heinrich Hoffmann, the strongly antisemitic Hieronymite Catholic priest Bernhard Stempfle was a member of Hitler's inner circle in the early 1920s and frequently advised him on religious issues. He helped Hitler in the writing of Mein Kampf. He was killed by the SS in the 1934 purge.

==== Hitler on Christianity and "positive Christianity" ====
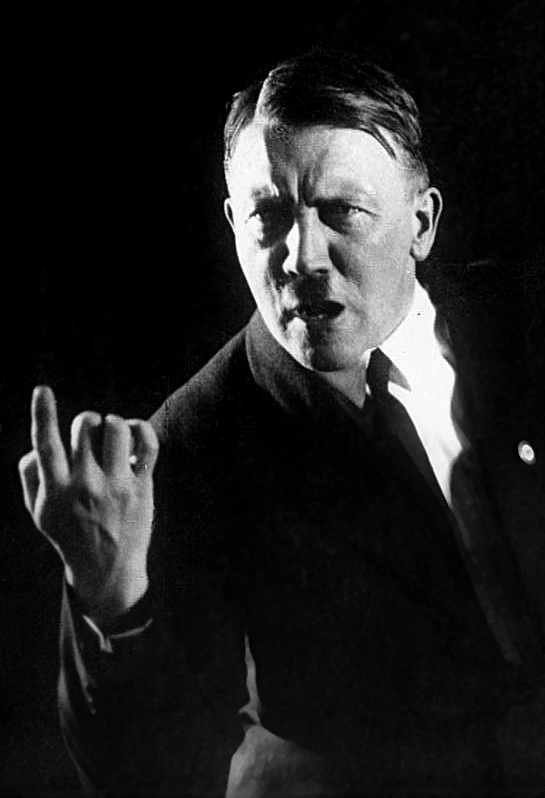
Adolf Hitler in 1927, rehearsing his oratorical gestures; photo by Heinrich Hoffmann, Bundesarchiv.

Article 24 of Hitler's National Socialist Programme of 1920 had endorsed what it termed "positive Christianity", but placed religion below party ideology by adding the caveat that it must not offend "the moral sense of the German race". Nondenominational, the term could be variously interpreted, but allayed fears among Germany's Christian majority as to the oft-expressed anti-Christian convictions of large sections of the Nazi movement. It further proposed a definition of a "positive Christianity" which could combat the "Jewish-materialistic spirit".

In 1922, a decade before Hitler took power, former prime minister of Bavaria Count von Lerchenfeld-Köfering stated in a speech before the Landtag of Bavaria that his beliefs "as a man and a Christian" prevented him from being an antisemite or from pursuing antisemitic public policies. Hitler turned Lerchenfeld's perspective of Jesus on its head, telling a crowd in Munich:

I would like here to appeal to a greater than I, Count Lerchenfeld. He said in the last session of the Landtag that his feeling 'as a man and a Christian' prevented him from being an anti-Semite. I say: My feeling as a Christian points me to my Lord and Savior as a fighter. It points me to the man who once in loneliness, surrounded only by a few followers, recognized these Jews for what they were and summoned men to fight against them and who, God's truth! was greatest not as a sufferer but as a fighter. In boundless love as a Christian and as a man I read through the passage which tells us how the Lord at last rose in His might and seized the scourge to drive out of the Temple the brood of vipers and adders. How terrific was his fight against the Jewish poison. Today, after two thousand years, with deepest emotion I recognize more profoundly than ever before the fact that it was for this that He had to shed his blood upon the Cross. As a Christian, I have no duty to allow myself to be cheated, but I have the duty to be a fighter for truth and justice.

In a 1928 speech, he said: "We tolerate no one in our ranks who attacks the ideas of Christianity ... in fact our movement is Christian."

In light of later developments, Rees notes, "The most persuasive explanation of [Hitler's] statements is that Hitler, as a politician, simply recognised the practical reality of the world he inhabited ... Had Hitler distanced himself or his movement too much from Christianity it is all but impossible to see how he could ever have been successful in a free election. Thus his relationship in public to Christianity – indeed his relationship to religion in general – was opportunistic. There is no evidence that Hitler himself, in his personal life, ever expressed any individual belief in the basic tenets of the Christian church". Richard Evans considers that the gap between Hitler's public and private pronouncements was due to a desire not to cause a quarrel with the churches that might undermine national unity.

In 1932, Hitler came up with the name German Christians (Deutsche Christen) for a pro-Nazi group within Protestantism. "Hitler saw the relationship in political terms. He was not a practicing Christian, but had somehow succeeded in masking his own religious skepticism from millions of German voters", wrote Overy, who considered that Hitler found the arrangement useful for a time, but ultimately expected Christianity to wilt and die before "the advances of science". In this early period, the "German Christian" movement sought to make the Protestant churches in Germany an instrument of Nazi policy. Adherents promoted notions of racial superiority and race destiny. Hitler backed the formal establishment of the "German Christians" in 1932. It was nationalistic and antisemitic and some of its radicals called for repudiation of the Old Testament (the Hebrew Scriptures) and the Pauline epistles of the New Testament – because of their Jewish authorship.

Hitler's movement was not united on questions of religion. The consensus among historians is that Nazism as a whole was either unrelated to Christianity or actively opposed to it. Use of the term "positive Christianity" in the Nazi Party Program of the 1920s is generally regarded as a tactical measure, rooted in politics rather than religious conviction. Author Steigmann-Gall has put forward a minority interpretation, that positive Christianity had an "inner logic" and been "more than a political ploy". He believes Hitler saw Jesus as an Aryan opponent of the Jews. Though anti-Christians later fought to "expunge Christian influence from Nazism" and the movement became "increasingly hostile to the churches", Steigmann-Gall wrote that even in the end, it was not "uniformly anti-Christian".

Samuel Koehne, a Research Fellow at the Alfred Deakin Research Institute, working on the official Nazi views on religion, answers the question Was Hitler a Christian? thus: "Emphatically not, if we consider Christianity in its traditional or orthodox form: Jesus as the son of God, dying for the redemption of the sins of all humankind. It is nonsense to state that Hitler (or any of the Nazis) adhered to Christianity of this form. ... However, it is equally true that there were leading Nazis who adhered to a form of Christianity that had been 'aryanised.'" and "Was Hitler an atheist? Probably not."

==== Nazi seizure of power ====
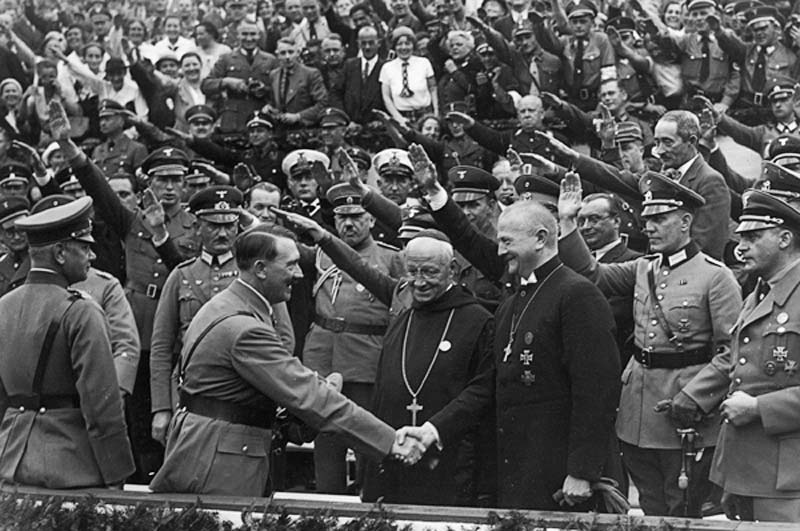
Hitler shaking hands with Lutheran Bishop Ludwig Müller in Germany in the 1930s

Prior to the Reichstag vote for the Enabling Act of 1933, under which Hitler gained the "temporary" dictatorial powers with which he went on to permanently dismantle the Weimar Republic, Hitler promised the German Parliament that he would not interfere with the rights of the churches. However, with power secured in Germany, Hitler quickly broke this promise.

Through 1933 and into 1934, the Nazi leader required a level of support from groups like the German conservatives and the Catholic Centre Party in the Reichstag, and of the conservative President von Hindenburg, in order to achieve his takeover of power with the "appearance of legality". In a proclamation on February 1, 1933, Hitler stated, "The National Government will regard it as its first and foremost duty to revive in the nation the spirit of unity and co-operation. It will preserve and defend those basic principles on which our nation has been built. It regards Christianity as the foundation of our national morality, and the family as the basis of national life."

On 21 March 1933, the Reichstag assembled in the Potsdam Garrison Church, to show the "unity" of Nazism with the old conservative Germany of President von Hindenburg. Two days later, the Nazis secured passage of the Enabling Act, granting Hitler dictatorial powers. Less than three months later all non-Nazi parties and organizations, including the Catholic Centre Party, had ceased to exist.

Hitler sought to gain the votes of the Catholic Centre Party and German conservatives for the Enabling Act with a mix of intimidation, negotiation and conciliation. On 23 March 1933, just prior to the vote for the Enabling Act, he described the Christian faiths as "essential elements for safeguarding the soul of the German people" and "We hold the spiritual forces of Christianity to be indispensable elements in the moral uplift of most of the German people." "With an eye to the votes of the Catholic Centre Party", wrote Shirer, he added that he "hoped to improve relations with the Holy See".

The Centre Party asked for guarantees of the rights of the churches. Hitler promised that the institutions of the Weimar Republic and churches would be protected, and said his government saw the churches as "the most important factors for upholding our nationhood". Amid threats and talk of civil war, the Centre Party voted for the Act. Hitler's false promises of protection for the churches and institutions of the republic were never kept.

In January 1934, Hitler angered the churches by appointing the neo-pagan Alfred Rosenberg as official Nazi ideologist. The Fuhrer launched an effort toward coordination of German Protestants under a unified Protestant Reich Church under the Deutsche Christen Movement, but the attempt failed – resisted by the Confessing Church. In The Aryan Jesus: Christian Theologians and the Bible in Nazi Germany, Susannah Heschel noted that the Deutsche Christen differed from traditional Christians by rejecting the Hebrew origins of Christianity. In public statements made during his rule, Hitler continued to speak positively about a Nazi vision of Christian German culture, and his belief in an Aryan Christ. Hitler added that Saint Paul, as a Jew, had falsified Jesus' message – a theme Hitler repeated in private conversations, including, in October 1941, when he made the decision to murder the Jews.

Ian Kershaw said that Hitler had lost interest in supporting the Deutsche Christen from around 1934. However, in a speech 26 June 1934, Hitler stated:

The National Socialist State professes its allegiance to positive Christianity. It will be its honest endeavour to protect both the great Christian Confessions in their rights, to secure them from interference with their doctrines (Lehren), and in their duties to constitute a harmony with the views and the exigencies of the State of today.

In 1937, Hanns Kerrl, Hitler's Minister for Church Affairs, explained "positive Christianity" as not "dependent upon the Apostles' Creed", nor in "faith in Christ as the son of God", upon which Christianity relied, but rather, as being represented by the Nazi Party: "The Fuehrer is the herald of a new revelation", he said.

During negotiations leading to the Reichskonkordat with the Vatican, Hitler said, "Secular schools can never be tolerated because such schools have no religious instruction, and a general moral instruction without a religious foundation is built on air; consequently, all character training and religion must be derived from faith." However, as Hitler consolidated his power, schools became a major battleground in the Nazi campaign against the churches. In 1937, the Nazis banned any member of the Hitler Youth from simultaneously belonging to a religious youth movement. Religious education was not permitted in the Hitler Youth and by 1939, clergymen teachers had been removed from virtually all state schools. Hitler sometimes allowed pressure to be placed on German parents to remove children from religious classes to be given ideological instruction in its place, while in elite Nazi schools, Christian prayers were replaced with Teutonic rituals and sun-worship. By 1939 all Catholic denominational schools had been disbanded or converted to public facilities.

The propaganda of the Nazi party actively promoted Hitler as a saviour of Christianity and Nazi propaganda supported the German Christians in their formation of a single national church that could be controlled and manipulated.

If positive Christianity means love of one's neighbour, i.e. the tending of the sick, the clothing of the poor, the feeding of the hungry, the giving of drink to those who are thirsty, then it is we who are the more positive Christians. For in these spheres the community of the people of National Socialist Germany has accomplished a prodigious work

— Speech to the Old Guard at Munich 24 February 1939

==== Hitler on mysticism and occultism ====
According to Bullock, as an adolescent in Vienna, Hitler read widely, including books on occultism, hypnotism, and astrology. However, his interest in these subjects was fleeting, and there is no evidence that he ever subscribed to any of these schools of thought. Bullock found "no evidence to support the once popular belief that Hitler resorted to astrology" and wrote that Hitler ridiculed those in his own party like Himmler (who wanted to re-establish pagan mythology) and Hess (who believed in astrology). Albert Speer wrote that Hitler had a negative view toward Himmler and Rosenberg's mystical notions. Speer quotes Hitler as having said of Himmler's attempt to mythologize the SS:

What nonsense! Here we have at last reached an age that has left all mysticism behind it, and now [Himmler] wants to start that all over again. We might just as well have stayed with the church. At least it had tradition. To think that I may, some day, be turned into an SS saint! Can you imagine it? I would turn over in my grave ...

— Hitler quoted in Albert Speer's Inside the Third Reich

In a speech he made in Nuremberg on September 6, 1938, Hitler said that Christian mysticism creates dark forces, that there are no places of worship—but places of national anthem—that there are no cult places, there are national places, besides, he rejected mysticism and occultism:

I want to differentiate here between the Volk, i.e. the healthy, full-blooded mass of Germany loyal to the Volk, and a decadent, so-called high society, unreliable because only conditionally linked by blood. It is sometimes casually referred to as the 'upper class,' being, however, in reality no more than the scum produced by a societal mutation gone haywire from having had its blood and thinking infected by cosmopolitism. In this period of the most inward orientation, Christian mysticism demanded an approach to the solution of structural problems and hence to an architecture whose design not only ran contrary to the spirit, of the time, but which also helped produce these mysterious dark forces which made the people increasingly willing to submit themselves to cosmopolitism. ... This philosophy does not advocate mystic cults, but rather aims to cultivate and lead a Volk determined by its blood. [–] Therefore we do not have halls for cults, but halls for the Volk. Nor do we have places for worship, but places for assembly and squares for marches. We do not have cult sites, but sports arenas and play areas. And it is because of this that our assembly halls are not bathed in the mystical twilight of cult sites but rather are places of brightness and light of a beautiful and practical nature. In these halls, no cult rituals take place, they are exclusively the site of Volk rallies of the type which we conducted in the years of our struggle, which we have become accustomed to, and which we shall preserve in this manner. We will not allow mystically-minded occult folk with a passion for exploring the secrets of the world beyond to steal into our Movement. Such folk are not National Socialists, but something else – in any case, something which has nothing to do with us. At the head of our program there stand no secret surmisings but clear-cut perception and straightforward profession of belief. But since we set as the central point of this perception and of this profession of belief the maintenance and hence the security for the future of a being formed by God, we thus serve the maintenance of a divine work and fulfill a divine will – not in the secret twilight of a new house of worship, but openly before the face of the Lord.

Corroborating the Nuremberg speech of September 6, 1938, about Hitler's view on Church's architecture (which according to Hitler was inspired from Christian mysticism, which produced "dark forces") we find a similar thought which Hitler expressed to Goebbels about the "gloomy Cathedral", where he prefers the ancient Greek and Roman temples which according to Hiler were "light, airy" in contrast to the "gloomy" Gothic Cathedrals. It is also important to note that Hitler forbade bombing Athens when the Wehrmacht invaded Greece in 1941, due to his love for the ancient Greek temples/architecture, while the Luftwaffe specifically targeted Coventry Cathedral during the Coventry Blitz:

[The Führer] hates Christianity, because it has crippled all that is noble in humanity. According to Schopenhauer, Christianity and syphilis have made humanity unhappy and unfree. What a difference between the benevolent, smiling Zeus and the pain-wracked, crucified Christ. ... What a difference between a gloomy cathedral and a light, airy ancient temple. ... The Führer cannot relate to the Gothic mind. He hates gloom and brooding mysticism. He wants clarity, light, beauty. And these are the ideals of life in our time.

According to Ron Rosenbaum, some scholars believe the young Hitler was strongly influenced, particularly in his racial views, by an abundance of occult works on the mystical superiority of the Germans, like the occult and antisemitic magazine Ostara, and give credence to the claim of its publisher Jörg Lanz von Liebenfels that Hitler visited him in 1909 and praised his work. John Toland wrote that evidence indicates Hitler was a regular reader of Ostara. Toland also included a poem that Hitler allegedly wrote while serving in the German Army on the Western Front in 1915.

The seminal work on Ariosophy, The Occult Roots of Nazism by Nicholas Goodrick-Clarke, devotes its last chapter the topic of Ariosophy and Adolf Hitler. Not at least due to the difficulty of sources, historians disagree about the importance of Ariosophy for Hitler's religious views. As noted in the foreword of The Occult Roots of Nazism by Rohan Butler, Goodrick-Clarke is more cautious in assessing the influence of Lanz von Liebenfels on Hitler than Joachim Fest in his biography of Hitler.

Comparing Hitler to Erich Ludendorff, Fest writes: "Hitler had detached himself from such affections, in which he encountered the obscurantism of his early years, Lanz v. Liebenfels and the Thule Society, again, long ago and had, in Mein Kampf, formulated his scathing contempt for that völkisch romanticism, which however his own cosmos of imagination preserved rudimentarily." Fest refers to the following passage from Mein Kampf:

"The characteristic thing about these people [modern-day followers of the early Germanic religion] is that they rave about the old Germanic heroism, about dim prehistory, stone axes, spear and shield, but in reality are the greatest cowards that can be imagined. For the same people who brandish scholarly imitations of old German tin swords, and wear a dressed bearskin with bull's horns over their heads, preach for the present nothing but struggle with spiritual weapons, and run away as fast as they can from every Communist blackjack.

In a speech about Paul von Hindenburg on 7 August 1934 (five days after Hindenburg's death), Hitler said that a martyred commander would go to Valhalla:

Nearly twenty years ago today, the bells sounded here and echoed throughout Germany for the first time in honor of the name of the Field Marshal. Today, to the peal of these same bells, the nation has accompanied its venerable departed hero back to the great battlefield of his unequaled victory. It is here, in the midst of the slumbering grenadiers of his victorious regiments, that the tired commander shall find his peace. The towers of the castle shall be defiant guards of this, his last great headquarters in the East. Standards and flags shall salute him. And the German Volk will come to its dead hero to gather new strength for life in times of need, for even when the last trace of this body shall have been obliterated, his name will ever more be immortal. Dead Commander, enter into Valhalla now!

It is not clear if this statement is an attack at anyone specific. It could have been aimed at Karl Harrer or at the Strasser group. According to Goodrick-Clarke, "In any case, the outburst clearly implies Hitler's contempt for conspiratorial circles and occult-racist studies and his preference for direct activism." Hitler also said something similar in public speeches.

Older literature states that Hitler had no intention of instituting worship of the ancient Germanic gods in contrast to the beliefs of some other Nazi officials. In Hitler's Table Talk one can find this quote:

It seems to me that nothing would be more foolish than to re-establish the worship of Wotan. Our old mythology ceased to be viable when Christianity implanted itself. Nothing dies unless it is moribund.

In an article published by the Simon Wiesenthal Center, Jackson J. Spielvogel and David Redles assert that alleged influences of various portions of the teachings of H. P. Blavatsky (the founder of the Theosophical Society with doctrines as expounded by her 1888 book The Secret Doctrine) and the adaptations of her ideas by her followers, through Ariosophy, the Germanenorden and the Thule Society, constituted a popularly unacknowledged but decisive influence over the developing mind of Hitler. The scholars state that Hitler himself may be responsible for turning historians from investigating his occult influences. While he publicly condemned and even persecuted occultists, Freemasons, and astrologers, his nightly private talks disclosed his belief in the ideas of these competing occult groups – demonstrated by his discussion of reincarnation, Atlantis, world ice theory, and his belief that esoteric myths and legends of cataclysm and battles between gods and titans were a vague collective memory of monumental early events.

In his childhood, Hitler had admired the pomp of Catholic ritual and the hierarchical organization of the clergy. Later he drew on these elements, organizing his party along hierarchical lines and including liturgical forms into events or using phraseology taken from hymns. Because of these liturgical elements, Daim's claim of Hitler's messiah-like status and the ideology's totalitarian nature, the Nazi movement, like other fascist movements and communism, is sometimes termed a "political religion" that is anti-ecclesiastical and anti-religious.

Although Hitler expressed negative views towards the mystical notions of some of his senior Nazi underlings in private, he nevertheless appointed Heinrich Himmler and Alfred Rosenberg to senior positions in the Nazi movement. William L. Shirer wrote that, "under the leadership of Rosenberg, Bormann and Himmler – backed by Hitler – the Nazi regime intended to destroy Christianity in Germany, if it could, and substitute the old paganism of the early tribal Germanic gods with the new paganism of the Nazi extremists". The régime launched an effort toward coordination of German Protestants under a unified Protestant Reich Church (but this was resisted by the Confessing Church), and moved early to eliminate political Catholicism. Blainey wrote: "Nazism itself was a religion, a pagan religion, and Hitler was its high priest ... Its high altar [was] Germany itself and the German people, their soil and forests and language and traditions".

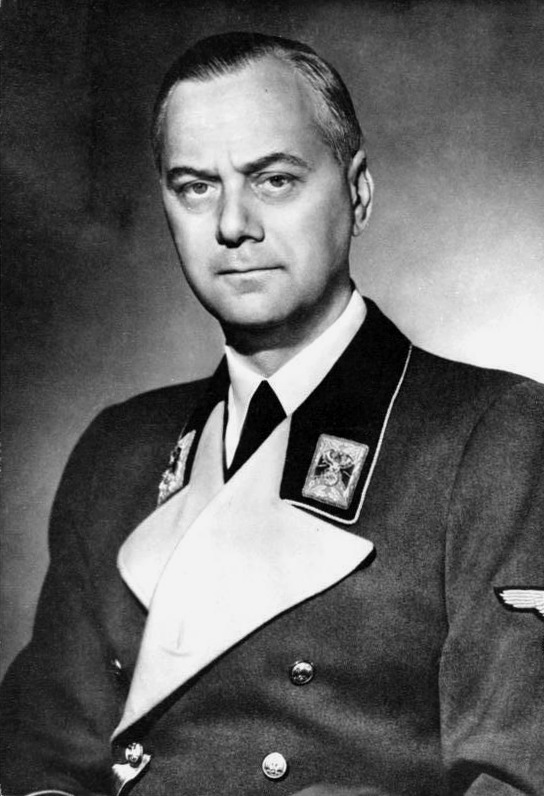
Hitler appointed the neo-Pagan Alfred Rosenberg as official Nazi ideologist.

In 1924, during his imprisonment, Hitler had chosen Alfred Rosenberg to lead the Nazi movement in his absence. In his seminal 1930 work The Myth of the Twentieth Century, Rosenberg wrote: "We now realize that the central supreme values of the Roman and the Protestant Churches ... hinder the organic powers of the peoples determined by their Nordic race ... they will have to be remodeled". Hitler called Rosenberg's book "derivative, pastiche, illogical rubbish!" But in January 1934, Hitler appointed Rosenberg as the cultural and educational leader of the Reich – the official Nazi philosopher and ideologist. Rosenberg was notoriously anti-Christian. Church officials were perturbed by Hitler's appointment of Rosenberg as Nazi philosopher as it apparently endorsed Rosenberg's anti-church and neo-pagan philosophy. The Vatican banned The Myth of the Twentieth Century in February 1934. During the war, Rosenberg outlined the future he envisioned for religion in Germany. Among its articles: the National Reich Church of Germany was to claim exclusive control over all churches; publication of the Bible was to cease; crucifixes, Bibles and saints were to be removed from altars; and Mein Kampf was to be placed on altars as "to the German nation and therefore to God the most sacred book"; and the Christian Cross was to be removed from all churches and replaced with the swastika. But Rosenberg was, in the end, a marginalised figure in the Hitler regime.

In 1929, Hitler selected Heinrich Himmler to head the Nazi Schutzstaffel (SS) security forces. Himmler saw the main task of the SS as "acting as the vanguard in overcoming Christianity and restoring a 'Germanic' way of living" in order to prepare for the coming conflict between "humans and subhumans": He set about making his SS the focus of a "cult of the Teutons". In 1937 Himmler wrote that it was "the mission of the SS to give the German people in the next half century the non-Christian ideological foundations on which to lead and shape their lives. This task does not consist solely in overcoming an ideological opponent but must be accompanied at every step by a positive impetus: in this case that means the reconstruction of the German heritage in the widest and most comprehensive sense."

==== Hitler on atheism ====
Hitler viewed atheists as uneducated, and atheism as the state of the animals. He associated atheism with Bolshevism, communism, and "Jewish materialism". Richard Overy cited Hitler's belief in racial biology as evidence of scientific views and atheism, but stated that Hitler was not a thorough atheist in that sense because of his theistic and spiritual ideologies:

Truth lay in natural science, and for Hitler that meant the truths of racial biology – natural selection, racial struggle, "identity of kind". Hitler was politically prudent enough not to trumpet his scientific views publicly, not least because he wanted to maintain the distinction between his own movement and the godlessness of Soviet Communism. Nor was he a thorough atheist. His public utterances are peppered with references to "God" and "Spirit". For Hitler the eschatological truths that he found in his perception of the race represented the real "eternal will that rules the universe"; in the infinite value of the race and the struggle to sustain it men find what they might call God, an inner sense of the unity and purposiveness of nature and history ...Such views could be detected in the development of critical theology in Germany before the First World War, which suggested that God should be experienced as inner feeling rather than as external morality... What Hitler could not accept was that Christianity could offer anything other than false "ideas" to sustain its claim to moral certitude.

— Excerpt from The Dictators: Hitler's Germany, Stalin's Russia by Richard Overy

The historian Geoffrey Blainey wrote that Hitler courted and benefited from fear among German Christians of militant Communist atheism. "The aggressive spread of atheism in the Soviet Union alarmed many German Christians", wrote Blainey, and with the National Socialists becoming the main opponent of Communism in Germany: "[Hitler] himself saw Christianity as a temporary ally, for in his opinion 'one is either a Christian or a German'. To be both was impossible." In early 1933, Hitler publicly defended National Socialism against charges that it was anti-Christian. Responding to accusations by Eugen Bolz, the Catholic Centre Party Staatspräsident of Württemberg, that the National Socialist movement threatened the Christian faith, he said:

And now Staatspräsident Bolz says that Christianity and the Catholic faith are threatened by us. And to that charge I can answer: In the first place it is Christians and not international atheists who now stand at the head of Germany. I do not merely talk of Christianity, no, I also profess that I will never ally myself with the parties which destroy Christianity. If many wish today to take threatened Christianity under their protection, where, I would ask, was Christianity for them in these fourteen years when they went arm in arm with atheism? No, never and at no time was greater internal damage done to Christianity than in these fourteen years when a party, theoretically Christian, sat with those who denied God in one and the same Government.

— Hitler, Speech delivered at Stuttgart, 15 February 1933

In a radio address October 14, 1933 Hitler stated, "For eight months we have been waging a heroic battle against the Communist threat to our Volk, the decomposition of our culture, the subversion of our art, and the poisoning of our public morality. We have put an end to denial of God and abuse of religion. We owe Providence humble gratitude for not allowing us to lose our battle against the misery of unemployment and for the salvation of the German peasant."

In a speech delivered in Berlin, October 24, 1933, Hitler stated: "We were convinced that the people needs and requires this faith. We have therefore undertaken the fight against the atheistic movement, and that not merely with a few theoretical declarations: we have stamped it out." In a speech delivered at Koblenz, August 26, 1934 Hitler said: "There may have been a time when even parties founded on the ecclesiastical basis were a necessity. At that time Liberalism was opposed to the Church, while Marxism was anti-religious. But that time is past. National Socialism neither opposes the Church nor is it anti-religious, but on the contrary, it stands on the ground of a real Christianity. The Church's interests cannot fail to coincide with ours alike in our fight against the symptoms of degeneracy in the world of today, in our fight against the Bolshevist culture, against an atheistic movement, against criminality, and in our struggle for the consciousness of a community in our national life, for the conquest of hatred and disunion between the classes, for the conquest of civil war and unrest, of strife and discord. These are not anti-Christian, these are Christian principles."

==== Hitler on Hinduism ====
Hitler's choice of the swastika as the Nazis' main and official symbol was linked to the belief in the Aryan cultural descent of the German people. They considered the early Aryans to be the prototypical white invaders and the sign of the Hakenkreuz or hooked cross, commonly misunderstood as the Hindu swastika, to be a symbol of the Aryan master race. The theory was inspired by the German archaeologist Gustaf Kossinna, who argued that the ancient Aryans were a superior Nordic race from northern Germany who expanded into the steppes of Eurasia, and from there into India, where they established the Vedic religion.

==== Hitler on Islam ====
Hitler's views on Islam are also a matter of controversy. On the one hand, Hitler privately demeaned ethnic groups he associated with Islam, notably Arabs, as racially inferior. On the other hand, he was also purported to make private and public statements expressing admiration for what was perceived to be the militaristic nature of Islam.

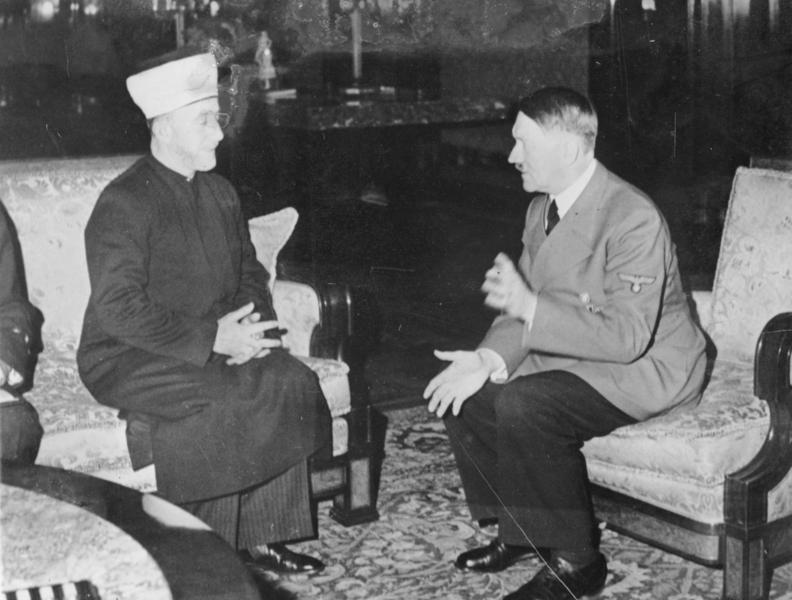
Hitler meeting Amin al-Husseini, the then Grand Mufti of Jerusalem. December 1941

Among Eastern religions, Hitler described religious leaders such as "Confucius, Buddha, and Muhammad" as providers of "spiritual sustenance". In this context, Hitler's connection to Amin al-Husseini, who served as the Grand Mufti of Jerusalem until 1937– which included his asylum in 1941 – has been interpreted by some as a sign of respect, while others characterize it as a relationship born out of political expediency. Starting in 1933, al-Husseini, who had launched a campaign to both expel the British from the Middle East and Jews from both Egypt and Palestine, became impressed by the Jewish boycott policies which the Nazis were enforcing in Germany, and hoped that he could use the antisemitic views which many in the Arab region shared with Hitler's regime in order to forge a strategic military alliance that would help him eliminate the Jews from Palestine. Despite al-Husseini's attempts to reach out to Germany, Hitler refused to form such an alliance with al-Husseini, fearing that it would weaken relations with Britain. During the 1936–1939 Arab revolt in Palestine, Husseini strengthened ties with Germany, fostering the spread of Nazi customs in Palestinian strongholds. The Muslim Brotherhood in Egypt followed suit. Hitler's influence grew in the region, with the German government approving financial and military support for Husseini and the Muslim Brotherhood in 1937. At times, Hitler blamed Christianity for the emergence of Islam.

During a meeting with a delegation of distinguished Arab figures, Hitler learned of how Islam motivated the Umayyad Caliphate during the invasion of Gaul. According to Albert Speer, referencing Hitler's Table Talk, Hitler wished that the Caliphate had won the Battle of Tours against the Franks in 732: "The Mohammedan religion would have been much more compatible to us than Christianity. Why did it have to be Christianity with its meekness and flabbiness?" "Had Charles Martel not been victorious at Poitiers – already, you see, the world had fallen into the hands of the Jews, so gutless a thing was Christianity! – then we should in all probability have been converted to Mohammedanism, that cult which glorifies heroism and which opens the seventh Heaven to the bold warrior alone. Then the Germanic races would have conquered the world. Christianity alone prevented them from doing so." According to Speer, Hitler believed that if Islam had taken root in central Europe, the Germanic people would have become the "heirs of that religion" and would have "stood at the head of this Mohammedan Empire" as Islam, according to him suited the Germanic temperament. The remarks are problematic as they originate with Hitler's Table Talk. Historian Mikael Nilsson has noted that the Table Talks where Hitler's comment came from were heavily distorted and revised, especially by Francois Genoud, who also forged The Testament of Adolf Hitler and likely inserted pro-Arab phrases to reconcile his own support for Arab Nationalism and Terrorism. It contrasts sharply with other comments he has known to have made referencing Islam. Many of which was kept by the stenographers of the German Foreign Ministry. In March 1944 Hitler stated that Germany was defending Europe as it had done in the past when it "broke the Arab wave at Poitiers", and prevented south-eastern Europe from being "lost forever" in the Great Turkish War. Hitler compared Islam to Communism—and Christian Europe's wars against Islamic empires to his war against the Soviet Union—on numerous occasions, such as in December 1942 (where he contrasted the "inner process" of Germany's Protestant Reformation with the foreign world view and foreign races that the Islamic world and Soviet Union represented), January 1943, February 1943 (in a letter to Benito Mussolini), and a second time during March 1944, where he compared the alliance between the Soviet Union and the United Kingdom with the Franco-Ottoman Alliance against the Holy Roman Empire of the German Nation—saying that like France the British were allying themselves with an "anti-European power", and he referred to Islam as the empowering ideology of the anti-European world similar to Communism in his own day, and like Islam (that he said was built around a "Muslim race"), he claimed Communism flew under a second banner of "Pan-Slavism". In the table talks themselves he gives approval to historical Christian powers fighting against Islamic empires at times, such as the Holy Roman Empire's conflict with the Ottoman Empire in the Great Turkish War, which he referred to as the "glorious days of Prince Eugene".

Hitler also referred to Germany's invasion of the Soviet Union as a "Crusade" ("Kreuzzug", literally translated as "Cross-struggle") naming it "Operation Barbarossa" after the crusading Holy Roman Emperor Frederick Barbarossa who set out on a campaign against the Muslim Sultan Saladin. At a Nuremberg rally on September 14, 1936 he also mocked that a British journalist ignoring the threat of the Soviet Union to Europe was no different than a 15th-century "Humanist" in Vienna denying the threat of Islam to Europe during the Ottoman Empire's expansion because "it divided the world into east and west".

Despite Hitler's seeming admiration for Islam at times, and his willingness to work with some exiled Arab political leaders, he viewed Arab people as racial and social inferiors. Speer acknowledged that in private, Hitler regarded Arabs as an inferior race and that the relationship he had with various Muslim figures was more political than personal. Hitler was also quoted in the early war years stating, "We shall continue to make disturbances in the Far East and in Arabia. Let us think as men and let us see in these peoples at best lacquered half-apes who are anxious to experience the lash." However, he is alleged to have also acknowledged positive aspects of Muslim culture, stating that the peoples of Islam would be closer to Germany than, for instance, France. This however comes from a Francois Genoud forgery.

Despite being a minority in Europe, Arabs faced Nazi persecution with racist incidents against Egyptians in the 1930s. The Nazis targeted individuals of mixed Arab/North African heritage, sterilizing hundreds and imprisoning 450 Arab inmates in concentration camps, including Auschwitz, where they were subjected to forced labor, particularly Algerians residing in France.

In spite of Hitler's conflicting opinions on Islam and Arabs, in a letter to President Roosevelt during the war, Winston Churchill pointed out that Muslim soldiers were providing "the main army elements on which we [the British] must rely for the immediate fighting." Many Muslims have sacrificed themselves to save Jews and fight the Nazis the like of Noor Inayat Khan, Abdol-Hossein Sardari, and Si Kaddour Benghabrit the founder of the Great Mosque of Paris.

==== Hitler on Judaism ====
National Socialist ideology developed a racial hierarchy which placed minority groups – most especially the Jews – as subhuman. The categorization was based on the Nazi conception of race, and not on religion, thus Slavs and Poles (who were overwhelmingly Christian) were also grouped as inferior to the so-called "Aryan" peoples. Hitler espoused a ruthless policy of "negative eugenic selection", believing that world history consisted of a struggle for survival between races, in which the Jews plotted to undermine the Germans, and inferior groups like Slavs and defective individuals in the German gene pool, threatened the Aryan "master race". However, Hitler also had ideological objections to Judaism as a faith, and some of Hitler's antipathy towards Pauline Christianity (as opposed to his "Nordic Jesusism") flowed from its Jewish origins, as he saw (Pauline) Christianity as "indelibly Jewish in origin and character" and a "prototype of Bolshevism", which "violated the law of natural selection".

Writing for the public in Mein Kampf, Hitler described the Jews as enemies of all civilization and as materialistic, unspiritual beings: "His life is only of this world, and his spirit is inwardly as alien to true Christianity as his nature two thousand years previous was to the great founder of the new doctrine." In the work, he also described a supposedly divine mandate for his antisemitism: "Hence today I believe that I am acting in accordance with the will of the Almighty Creator: by defending myself against the Jew, I am fighting for the work of the Lord."

During negotiations for the Concordat between the Catholic Church and Germany in 1933, Hitler said to Bishop of Osnabrück Wilhelm Berning: "I have been attacked because of my handling of the Jewish question. The Catholic Church considered the Jews pestilent for fifteen hundred years, put them in ghettos, etc., because it recognised the Jews for what they were. In the epoch of liberalism the danger was no longer recognised. I am moving back toward the time in which a fifteen-hundred-year-long tradition was implemented. I do not set race over religion, but I recognise the representatives of this race as pestilant for the state and for the church and perhaps I am thereby doing Christianity a great service by pushing them out of schools and public functions".

==== Secular versus religious influences ====
Scholarly interest continues on the extent to which inherited, long-standing, cultural-religious notions of anti-Judaism in Christian Europe contributed to Hitler's personal racial antisemitism, and what influence a pseudo-scientific "primitive version of social-Darwinism", mixed with 19th century imperialist notions, brought to bear on his psychology. While Hitler's views on these subjects have often been called "social Darwinist", Hitler's grasp of the subject has been argued to have been incomplete, there is little agreement among historians as to what the term may mean, or how it transformed from its 19th-century scientific origins, to become a central component of a genocidal political ideology in the 20th century.

According to historian Lucy Dawidowicz, antisemitism has a long history within Christianity, and the line of "anti-Semitic descent" from Luther to Hitler is "easy to draw". In her The War Against the Jews, 1933–1945, she writes that Luther and Hitler were obsessed by the "demonologized universe" inhabited by Jews. Dawidowicz states that the similarities between Luther's antisemitic writings and modern antisemitism are no coincidence, because they derived from a common history of Judenhass which can be traced to Haman's advice to Ahasuerus, although modern German antisemitism also has its roots in German nationalism. Writers including Susannah Heschel and John Toland, have drawn links between Hitler's Catholic background and his antisemitism. Catholic historian José M. Sánchez argues that the antisemitism that led to the Holocaust was explicitly rooted in Christianity:

There is, of course, a long tradition of anti-Semitism in all of the Christian churches. ... There is little question that the Holocaust had its origin in the centuries-long hostility felt by Christians against Jews. There were pogroms in the Middle Ages. Jews faced legal and religious restrictions right up to the twentieth century in many countries. The popes, when they were monarchs of the Papal States, established ghettoes

Laurence Rees in contrast, notes that there is little emphasis on Christianity in Mein Kampf, which presents a view of the universe conspicuously at odds with traditional Christian notions long established in Germany. Hitler's vision is ordered instead around principles of struggle between weak and strong. Rees argues that Hitler's "bleak and violent vision" and visceral hatred of the Jews had been influenced by sources outside the Christian tradition. The notion of life as struggle Hitler drew from social Darwinism, the notion of the superiority of the "Aryan race" he drew from Arthur de Gobineau's The Inequality of the Human Races; from events following Russia's surrender in World War One when Germany seized agricultural lands in the East he formed the idea of colonising the Soviet Union; and from Alfred Rosenberg he took the idea of a link between Judaism and Bolshevism, writes Rees.

Richard J. Evans notes that Hitler "used his own version of the language of social Darwinism as a central element in the discursive practice of extermination...", and the language of Social Darwinism, in its Nazi variant, helped to remove all restraint from the directors of the "terroristic and exterminatory" policies of the regime, by "persuading them that what they were doing was justified by history, science and nature". Fest considers that Hitler simplified de Gobineau's elaborate ideas of struggle for survival among the different races, from which the Aryan race, guided by providence, was supposed to be the torchbearers of civilization.

In his rhetoric Hitler fed on the old accusation of Jewish deicide. It has been speculated that Christian anti-Judaism influenced Hitler's ideas, especially such works as Martin Luther's essay On the Jews and Their Lies and the writings of Paul de Lagarde. Others disagree with this view. Shirer argues that Luther's essay was influential. This view was expounded by Lucy Dawidowicz. (Dawidowicz 1986, p. 23) Uwe Siemon-Netto disputes this conclusion (Siemon-Netto 1995, pp. 17–20). Hitler biographer Toland writes that in 1941 Hitler was still "a member in good standing of the Church of Rome despite his detestation of its hierarchy" and adhered to "its teaching that the Jew was the killer of God. The extermination, therefore, could be done without a twinge of conscience since he was merely acting as the avenging hand of God – so long as it was done impersonally, without cruelty."

In the aftermath of World War II, a Soviet major who asserted Hitler's survival speculated that "It is possible that the man wishes to surround himself with the legend of Jesus Christ," implying that the escaped dictator would ape a main tenet of Christianity, the resurrection of Jesus.

== Hitler's policies towards religion ==
Smaller religious minorities faced harsher repression, with the German Jews expelled for extermination on the grounds of Nazi racial theories. Jehovah's Witnesses were ruthlessly persecuted for refusing both military service and allegiance to Hitler's movement.

=== Role of religion in the Nazi state ===
Nazi ideology could not accept an autonomous establishment whose legitimacy did not spring from the government. It desired the subordination of church to state. Nevertheless, Nazi Germany was not formally atheist, and other than for Jews and Jehovah's Witnesses, religious observance was permitted. Julian Baggini wrote that Hitler's Germany was not a "straightforwardly atheist state", but one which "sacralized" notions of blood and nation.

Hitler feared the results of overt attacks on the deep-rooted German churches, as around two thirds of Germans were Protestant and most of the rest were Roman Catholic. German conservative elements, such as the officer corps of the army, opposed Nazi efforts against the churches, and Hitler needed to show caution. The Hitler regime responded to the ideological challenge of Christian morality using political repression and persecution and by challenging Christian teachings through education and propaganda. Some scholars, such as Richard Steigmann-Gall, argue that while there were anti-Christian Nazis, they did not represent the movement's position.

==== Kirchenkampf Church Struggle ====
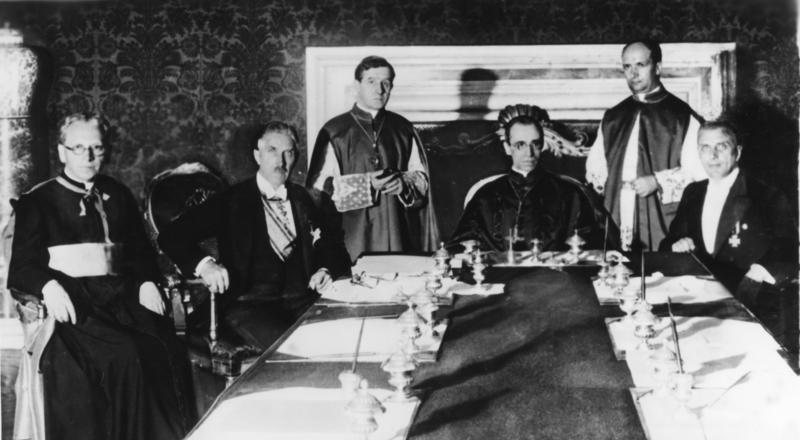
Vice-Chancellor Papen in Rome signs the Reich concordat. Hitler moved early to contain the churches, from whom he perceived a threat.

Hitler possessed radical instincts in relation to the Nazi conflict with the Churches, and though he occasionally spoke of wanting to delay a struggle and was prepared to restrain his anti-clericalism out of political considerations, Kershaw considers that his "own inflammatory comments gave his immediate underlings all the license they needed to turn up the heat in the 'Church Struggle'".

According to Overy, Hitler "wanted to neutralise any political threat from organised religion. ... The first step was to reach agreement with the Roman Catholic Church, whose theology was not susceptible to the new nationalist trends". Hitler dispatched the Catholic conservative Franz von Papen to negotiate a Concordat with the Vatican. He obtained an agreement that clergy would refrain from politics, in return for guarantees of Church rights. Hitler was delighted, and received the congratulations of German Catholic leaders. However, violations of the treaty began almost as soon as it was signed. Hitler promulgated the sterilization law, and began work to dissolve the Catholic Youth League. Clergy, nuns and lay leaders began to be targeted, leading to thousands of arrests over the ensuing years, often on trumped up charges of currency smuggling or "immorality". Catholic publications were shut down. The Gestapo began to violate the sanctity of the confessional.

As Hitler's genocidal plans began to manifest, Catholic priests and bishops held no public protests. Instead, they prayed in support of Germany's cause, seeking to show that their support for Hitler was undiminished.

By early 1937, the church hierarchy in Germany, which had initially attempted to co-operate with Hitler, had become highly disillusioned and Pope Pius XI issued the Mit brennender Sorge encyclical – accusing Germany of violations of the Concordat and of sowing the tares of "open fundamental hostility to Christ and His Church", and denounced the pagan myth of "blood and soil". Hitler's invasion of the predominantly Catholic Poland in 1939 ignited the Second World War. Kershaw wrote that, in Hitler's scheme for the Germanization of the East, "There would, he made clear, be no place in this utopia for the Christian Churches".

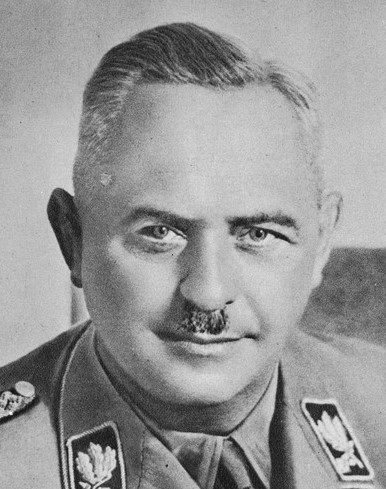
Hitler appointed Hanns Kerrl as Minister for Church Affairs in 1935. Kerrl rejected Christ as the basis of Christianity.

On Protestantism, Hitler proposed to unite Germany's 28 Protestant churches into one Reich Church, which was the German Evangelical Church. Hitler stated to Albert Speer, "Through me the Protestant Church could become the established church, as in England." Steigmann-Gall wrote that Hitler demonstrated a preference for Protestantism over Catholicism, as Protestantism was more liable to reinterpretation and non-traditional readings, more receptive to "positive Christianity", and because some of its liberal branches had held similar views. Hitler's interest was opportunistic: "From Hitler's point of view, a national church was of interest purely from a point of view of control and manipulation", wrote Kershaw. He installed his friend Ludwig Müller as leader of the movement and sought to establish a pro-Nazi and antisemitic unified Reich Church. Resistance quickly arose in the form of the Pastors' Emergency League, led by Martin Niemöller, which had 40% of clergy by 1934 and founded the Confessing Church, from which some clergymen opposed the Nazi regime.

When German Christians called for rejection of the Bible as "Jewish superstition" and of the Christian calling to "love thy neighbour", the movement lost still further support. Hitler's move to have Müller elected Bishop failed – despite intimidation. He then abandoned his efforts to unite the Protestant churches, appointed Hanns Kerrl as Minister for Church Affairs in December 1934, and distanced himself permanently from the so-called "German Christians". According to Steigmann-Gall, he regretted that "the churches had failed to back him and his movement as he had hoped". A relative moderate, Kerrl initially had some success but amid continuing protests by the Confessing Church against Nazi policies, he accused dissident churchmen of failing to appreciate the Nazi doctrine of "Race, blood and soil". Kerrl said Nazi positive Christianity rejected the Apostles' Creed and Divinity of Christ as the basis of Christianity, and called Hitler the herald of a new revelation. Hitler had Niemöller sent to the concentration camps in 1938, where he remained until war's end. Hitler largely ignored Kerrl, who died in office in 1941 and was not replaced.

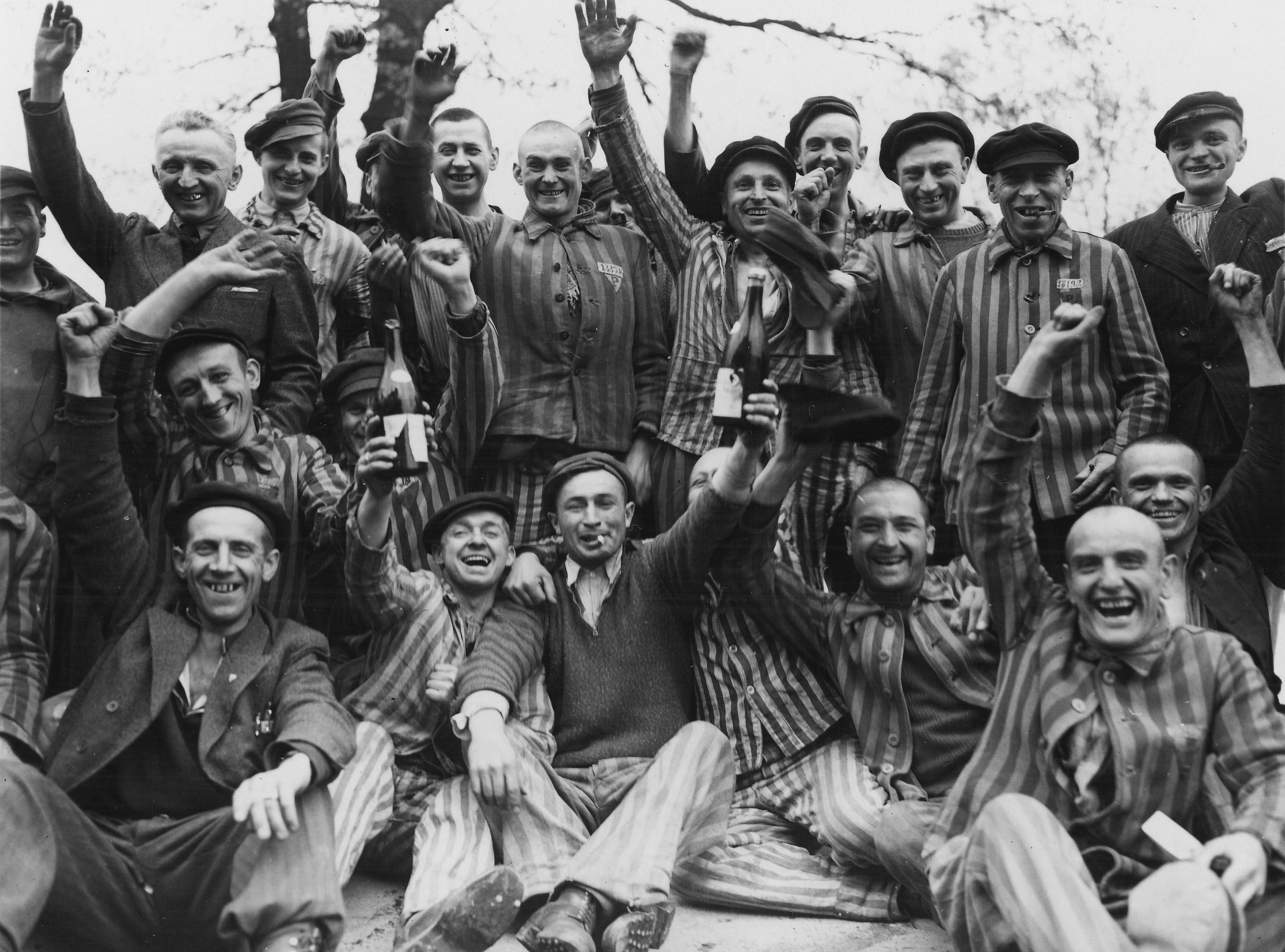
Dachau Concentration Camp had its own Priests' barracks for clerical enemies of the Hitler regime. (Pictured following liberation by US Army.)

From the mid 1930s, the Nazi movement came increasingly to be led by vehement anti-Christians, whom Hitler appointed to key positions. As with the "Jewish question", the radicals pushed the Church struggle forward, especially in Catholic areas, so that by the winter of 1935–1936 there was growing dissatisfaction with the Nazis in those areas. Kershaw wrote that in early 1937, Hitler again told his inner circle that though he "did not want a 'Church struggle' at this juncture", he expected "the great world struggle in a few years' time". Nevertheless, wrote Kershaw, Hitler's impatience with the churches "prompted frequent outbursts of hostility. In early 1937 he was declaring that 'Christianity was ripe for destruction', and that the Churches must yield to the "primacy of the state", railing against any compromise with "the most horrible institution imaginable". Priests were frequently denounced, arrested and sent to concentration camps. At Dachau, the regime established a dedicated Clergy Barracks for church dissidents. The Confessing Church seminary was banned. Its leaders, like Dietrich Bonhoeffer, were arrested. Implicated in the 1944 plot to assassinate Hitler, he was later executed.

==== Long-term plans for the churches ====
Overy wrote that Christianity was ultimately as incompatible with Nazism as it was with Soviet Communism and that "Hitler expected the end of the disease of Christianity to come about by itself once the falsehoods were self-evident. During the war he reflected that in the long run 'National Socialism and religion will no longer be able to exist together'." Other historians have written of a more active intent on the part of Hitler and the Nazi leadership. Kershaw noted that Hitler's scheme for the Germanization of Eastern Europe saw no place for Christian churches and that Goebbels wrote from conversations with Hitler that there was an insoluble opposition between the Christian and a Germanic-heroic world-view which would need settling after the war. Speer noted in his memoir that churches were not to receive building sites in Hitler's new Berlin. Bullock wrote "once the war was over, Hitler promised himself, he would root out and destroy the influence of the Christian Churches". The Nazi plan was to "de-Christianise Germany after the final victory", writes historian of German Resistance Anton Gill. "By the latter part of the decade of the thirties church officials were well aware that the ultimate aim of Hitler and other Nazis was the total elimination of Catholicism and of the Christian religion. Since the overwhelming majority of Germans were either Catholic or Protestant this goal had to be a long-term rather than a short-term Nazi objective", wrote Michael Phayer.

In its brief of evidence for the Nuremberg trials concerning the Nazi persecution of the churches, the American Office of Strategic Services (a forerunner to the CIA) compiled a report entitled "The Nazi Master Plan" which examined the Nazi persecution of the churches and found that the Hitler regime had a plan to subvert and destroy German Christianity. The investigator wrote:

"National Socialism was by its very nature hostile to Christianity and the Christian churches ... Conflict was inevitable ... Important leaders of the National Socialist party would have liked to meet this situation by a complete extirpation of Christianity and the substitution of a purely racial religion tailored to fit the needs of National Socialist policy. This radically anti-Christian position is most significantly presented in Alfred Rosenberg's Myth of the Twentieth Century...generally regarded after Mein Kampf as the most authoritative statement of National Socialist ideology. ... Thus in a declaration of 5 November 1934, Baldur von Schirach, the German youth leader declared... 'the destruction of Christianity was explicitly recognised as a purpose of the National Socialist movement'. Considerations of expediency made it impossible, however to adopt this radical anti-Christian policy officially. Thus the policy actually adopted was to reduce the influence of the Christian churches as far as possible through use of every available means, without provoking the difficulties of an open war of extermination."

— OSS; The Nazi Master Plan; Annex 4: The Persecution of the Christian Churches, 6 July 1945

According to Kershaw, in 1937 Goebbels noted Hitler was becoming more radical on the 'Church Question', and indicated that, though current political circumstances required waiting, his long-term plan was to eventually dissolve the Reich concordat with Rome, detach the church entirely from the state and turn the entire force of the party to 'the destruction of the clerics', and end the Peace of Westphalia in a 'great world showdown'. In 1941, when Bishop Clemens August Graf von Galen protested against Nazi Euthanasia and seizures of church properties, although Hitler's sympathies lay with the radicals who wanted von Galen dead and church properties seized, he calculated that this would turn Catholic areas still further against the regime. "Only the need for peace in relation with the churches to avoid deteriorating morale on the home front determined his stance", wrote Kershaw, "Events in the Warthegau (where by 1941 94% of churches and chapels in the Posen-Gnesen diocese were closed, 11% of the clergy were murdered, and most of the remainder thrust into prisons and concentration camps) showed the face of the future."

Explaining his stance towards future of Christianity and other religions under Nazi rule in a series of private conversations in 1941, Hitler states:

Christianity is a rebellion against natural law, a protest against nature. Taken to its logical extreme, Christianity would mean the systematic cultivation of the human failure... it's not opportune to hurl ourselves now into a struggle with the Churches. The best thing is to let Christianity die a natural death. A slow death has something comforting about it. The dogma of Christianity gets worn away before the advances of science. Religion will have to make more and more concessions. Gradually the myths crumble. All that's left is to prove that in nature there is no frontier between the organic and the inorganic."

— Adolf Hitler, in Hitler's Table Talk, pp. 33, 59,

==== Atheism ====
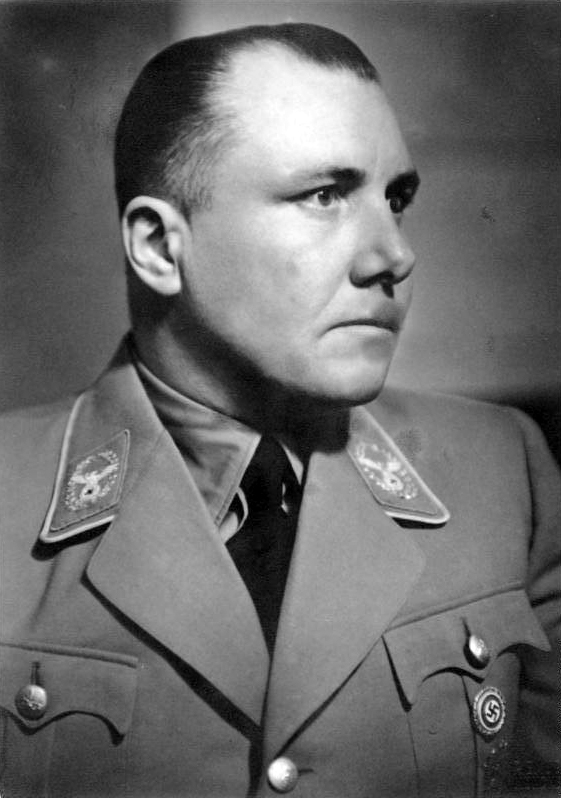
Martin Bormann, Hitler's deputy and a leading anti-Christian of the Nazi movement

The National Socialist movement was not formally atheist, and generally allowed religious observance. Julian Baggini wrote that Hitler's Germany was not a "straightforwardly atheist state", but one which "sacrilized" notions of blood and nation. On October 13, 1933, Deputy Führer Rudolf Hess issued a decree stating: "No National Socialist may suffer any detriment on the ground that he does not profess any particular faith or confession or on the ground that he does not make any religious profession at all." However, "The aggressive spread of atheism in the Soviet Union alarmed many German Christians", wrote Geoffrey Blainey, and Hitler saw Christianity as a "temporary ally" against Bolshevism, and courted and benefited from fear among German Christians of militant Communist atheism. In that same year the regime banned most atheistic and freethinking groups in Germany – other than those that supported the Nazis.

When criticised for anti-Christian sentiments in February 1933, Hitler claimed that it was the Nazis not the Catholic Centre Party that had taken on atheist politics. When negotiating the concordat with the Catholic Church, Hitler said he supported religious education in schools. Once in office however, Hitler then pursued a policy of suppression of denominational schools and church youth organizations. Clergymen teachers were removed from virtually all state schools. By 1939 all denominational schools had been disbanded or converted to public facilities. In that year, Evans notes, some 95% of Germans still called themselves Protestant or Catholic, while only 3.5% "Deist" (gottgläubig) and 1.5% atheist. Most in these latter categories were "convinced Nazis who had left their Church at the behest of the Party, which had been trying since the mid 1930s to reduce the influence of Christianity in society".

John Conway notes that the majority of the three million Nazi Party members continued to pay their church taxes and register as either Roman Catholic or Protestant Christians, "despite all Rosenberg's efforts." Aggressive anti-Church radicals like Joseph Goebbels and Martin Bormann saw the kirchenkampf campaign against the Churches as a priority concern, and anti-church and anticlerical sentiments were strong among grassroots party activists. From 1938, writes Overy, "Martin Bormann, head of the Party Chancellery and a prominent party atheist, took a leading role in trying to sever all state financial support for the churches, and to limit their legal status and activities, but the need to mobilise church support for the war effort from September 1939 led, as it did in the Soviet Union after 1941, to a limited political truce between church and state." Speer considered Bormann to be the driving force behind the regime's campaign against the churches and thought that Hitler approved of his aims, but wanted to "postpone this problem to a more favourable time":

George Mosse wrote of Bormann's beliefs:

[He believed that] God is present, but as a world-force which presides over the laws of life which the Nazis alone have understood. This non-Christian theism, tied to Nordic blood, was current in Germany long before Bormann wrote down his own thoughts on the matter. It must now be restored, and the catastrophic mistakes of the past centuries, which had put the power of the state into the hands of the Church, must be avoided. The Gauleiters are advised to conquer the influence of the Christian Churches by keeping them divided, encouraging particularism among them...

==== Jehovah's Witnesses ====
Jehovah's Witnesses numbered around 30,000 at the start of Hitler's rule in Germany. For refusing to declare loyalty to the Reich, and refusing conscription into the army, they were declared to be enemies of Germany and persecuted. About 6,000 were sent to the concentration camps.

==== Judaism ====
Anti-Judaism as well as racial antisemitism were central parts of Hitler's philosophy. His regime perpetrated the Final Solution, an effort to exterminate the Jews, which resulted in a genocide estimated by historians to have killed between 4,204,000 and 7,000,000 Jews. Hitler's ideology presented the Jews as a biological challenge to the "purity" of German blood.

==== Hitler in a religious role ====
Through Minister of Ecclesiastical Affairs Hanns Kerrl (d. 1941), the Nazi Party endorsed Hitler as effectively replacing Jesus in its effort to elevate state over church. Kerrl stated before some church leaders in 1937 that "Positive Christianity is National Socialism ... True Christianity is represented by the party ... the Führer is the herald of a new revelation."

== See also ==
- Arab and Muslim rescue efforts during the Holocaust
- Rescue of Jews by Catholics during the Holocaust
- Catholic resistance to Nazi Germany
- Gottgläubig
- Nazi occultism
- Odinism
- Religious affiliations of chancellors of Germany
