= Historiography of Adolf Hitler =

Area of study on dictator of Germany

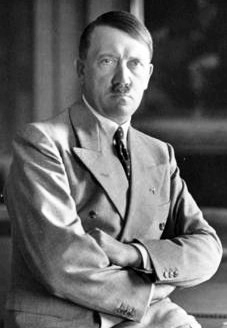
Adolf Hitler in 1936

The historiography of Adolf Hitler deals with the academic studies of Adolf Hitler from the 1930s to the present. In 1998, a German editor said there were 120,000 studies of Hitler and Nazi Germany. Since then many more have appeared, with many of them decisively shaping the historiography regarding Hitler.

== Early biographies and historiographical disputes ==
=== Konrad Heiden ===
The first important biography was written in exile in Switzerland by Konrad Heiden (1901–1966), Hitler: A Biography (2 vol Zürich, 1936–1937); an English version appeared as Der Führer – Hitler's Rise to Power (1944). Heiden was a journalist for a liberal newspaper who witnessed Hitler's rise to power and fled to exile when he realized that he was a target of the regime (he managed to escape the Gestapo). In his introduction Heiden wrote "the 'hero' of this book is neither a superman nor a puppet. He is a very interesting contemporary and, viewed quantitatively, a man who is stirred up the masses more than anyone else in human history." Heiden was successful in analyzing Hitler as an orator, how he drew strength from his audience, learning which points to emphasize to maximize his impact. Hitler realized it was emotion, not rationality, he had to appeal to, using repetition, exaggeration, little lies and big lies, all the while vehemently denouncing the horrors of the past and promising a sparkling bright visions of the future. Like all early biographers, Heiden paid little attention to the anti-Semitic fulminations, or to Hitler's goals of destroying the Jews and Generalplan Ost the seizure of control of Eastern Europe for German resettlement.

=== Alan Bullock ===
The Allies seized vast masses of documents in 1945, which British historian Alan Bullock (1914–2004) used with a brilliant writing style. Bullock's biography Hitler: A Study in Tyranny (1952) depicts Hitler as the product of the chaos in Germany after 1918, where uncertainty and anger inflamed extremism and created the ideal setting for Hitler's demagoguery to succeed. Bullock tells of a totally unprincipled opportunist, who had no deep values or goals, except seizing power by any means possible. In 1991, John Campbell wrote "Although written so soon after the end of the war and despite a steady flow of fresh evidence and reinterpretation, it has not been surpassed in nearly 40 years: an astonishing achievement."

=== Eberhard Jäckel ===
Bullock has generally stood the test of time, except that historians today reject the idea that Hitler was unprincipled, thanks especially to the work by German scholar Eberhard Jäckel (1929–2017), Professor of Modern History at the University of Stuttgart. In the 1970s and 1980s his demonstration of Hitler's unwavering commitment to a few extreme principles of removing Jews and conquering living space in the East is no longer disputed. Jäckel argues that Mein Kampf was not only a "blueprint" for power, but also for genocide. In Jäckel's view,

He had to annihilate the Jews, thus restoring the meaning of history, and with the thus restored, nature-intended struggle for existence, he at the same time had to conquer new living space for the German people. Each of these tasks was inextricably linked to the other. Unless the Jews were annihilated there would very soon no longer be any struggle for living space, nor therefore any culture and consequently nations would die out; not just the German nation, but ultimately all nations. But if, on the other hand, the German people failed to conquer new living space, it would die out because of that and the Jews would triumph".

=== Structuralism ===
Academic historians by the 1960s were committed to social history, and rejected the great man interpretation of the past. Biography could be a popular art form, but was theoretically incapable of explaining great events. Popular historians, biographers, and the general public disregarded these abstract laws history, and demanded colorful history based on idiosyncratic personality traits. This popular approach was based on what scholars call "intentionalism".

Who ordered the Holocaust has been a central theme of the debate. Intentionalists maintained that Adolf Hitler intended from the earliest days of his political career to exterminate Jews. Functionalists (or structuralists) argued that although Hitler had a longstanding murderous hatred of Jews, his plan to exterminate them did not arise until bureaucratic opportunities and world events (such as war with Russia) converged to make extermination possible. The debate largely faded away after 1980 as such scholars as Ian Kershaw and Michael Burleigh increasingly agreed that "intention" and "structure" are both essential to understanding Nazi Germany and need synthesis rather than opposition. Taking note of the shift of interest among professional historians toward social history in the 1960s, Alan Bullock agreed that in general deep long-term social forces are decisive in history but not always, he argued, for there are times when the Great Man is decisive. In revolutionary circumstances, "It is possible for an individual to exert a powerful even a decisive influence on the way events develop and the policies that are followed....After the pendulum has swung between exaggerating and underestimating [individuals]...the longer perspective suggests that in both cases neither the historical circumstances nor the individual personality is sufficient explanation by itself without the other".

Those historians who took an intentionalist line, like Andreas Hillgruber, argued that everything that happened after the invasion of the USSR in 1941 was part of a master plan he credited Hitler with developing in the 1920s. Hillgruber wrote in his 1967 book Germany and the Two World Wars that for Hitler,

The conquest of European Russia, the cornerstone of the continental European phase of his program, was thus for Hitler inextricably linked with the extermination of these "bacilli", the Jews. In his conception they had gained dominance over Russia with the Bolshevik Revolution. Russia thereby became the center from which a global danger radiated, particularly threatening to the Aryan race and its German core. To Hitler, Bolshevism meant the consummate rule of Jewry, while democracy—as it had developed in Western Europe and Weimar Germany—represented a preliminary stage of Bolshevism, since the Jews there won a leading, if not yet a dominant, influence. This racist component of Hitler's thought was so closely interwoven with the central political element of his program, the conquest of European Russia, that Russia's defeat and the extermination of the Jews were—in theory as later in practice—inseparable for him. To the aim of expansion per se, however, Hitler gave not racial, but political, strategic, economic and demographic underpinnings.

The German historian Helmut Krausnick argued that,

What is certain is that the nearer Hitler's plan to overthrow Russia as the last possible enemy on the continent of Europe approached maturity, the more he became obsessed with an idea—with which he had been toying as a "final solution" for a long time—of wiping out the Jews in the territories under his control. It cannot have been later than March 1941, when he openly declared his intention of having the political commissars of the Red Army shot, that he issued his secret decree—which never appeared in writing though it was mentioned verbally on several occasions—that the Jews should be eliminated.

Streim wrote that Krausnick had been taken in by the line invented after the war to reduce the responsibility of the Einsatzgruppen leaders brought to trial.

Against the intentionalist interpretation, functionalist historians like Martin Broszat argued that the lower officials of the Nazi state had started exterminating people on their own initiative. Broszat argued that the Holocaust began “bit by bit” as German officials stumbled into genocide. Broszat argued that in the fall of 1941 German officials had begun "improvised" killing schemes as the "simplest" solution. In Broszat's analysis, Hitler subsequently approved of the measures initiated by the lower officials and allowed the expansion of the Holocaust from Eastern Europe to all of Europe. In this way, Broszat argued that the Shoah was not begun in response to an order, written or unwritten, from Hitler but was rather "a way out of the blind alley into which the Nazis had manoeuvred themselves."

The American historian, Christopher Browning, has argued that,

Before the invasion, the Einsatzgruppen were not given explicit orders for the total extermination of Jews on Soviet territory. Along with the general incitement to an ideological and racial war, however, they were given the general task of liquidating "potential" enemies. Heydrich's much-debated directive of 2 July 1941 was a minimal list of those who had to be liquidated immediately, including all Jews in state and party positions. It is very likely, moreover, that the Einsatzgruppen leaders were told of the future goal of a Judenfrei [Jew-free] Russia through systematic mass murder.

The Swiss historian, Philippe Burrin, argues that such a decision was not made before August 1941 at the earliest. Browning argues that sometime in mid-July 1941 Hitler made the decision to begin general genocide owing to his exhilaration over his victories over the Red Army, whereas Burrin contends that the decision was made in late August 1941 owing to Hitler's frustration over the slowing down of the Wehrmacht. Kershaw argues that the dramatic expansion in both the range of victims and the intensity of the killings after mid-August 1941 indicates that Hitler issued an order to that effect, most probably a verbal order conveyed to the Einsatzgruppen commanders through either Himmler or Heydrich.

== Major biographies since the 1970s ==
=== Joachim Fest ===
Joachim Fest (1926–2006) was a German historian who wrote a biography of Hitler, Hitler: Eine Biographie (1973) (which was translated into English as Hitler (1974) by Richard and Clara Winston) which was the first major biography of Hitler since Alan Bullock's Hitler: A Study in Tyranny (1952) and was the first by a German writer. It was much praised by reviewers for its elegant style. Fest relied almost entirely on published sources, thereby avoiding the archival research that historians specialize in. He sees Hitler as a "singular personality," and downplays structuralism or indeed any systematic analysis of political and social context. He made his strongest statement against the structuralist historiography. Historians agreed to the quality of the work, but they noted that he downplayed the key role of conservative elites who enabled the Nazis come to power in 1933.

=== John Toland ===
American historian John Toland (1912–2004) wrote a biography of Hitler (1976) which was based on an extensive amount of original research, such as previously unpublished documents, diaries, notes, photographs, and interviews with Hitler's colleagues and associates.

=== Ian Kershaw ===
British historian Ian Kershaw (born 1943) wrote a two-volume biography of Hitler between 1998 and 2000 (Hitler 1889–1936: Hubris and Hitler 1936–1945: Nemesis) which has been hailed by historians as definitive, and as of 2012 has not been displaced at the top of the bibliographies. His approach is to emphasize structural factors, and then bring in Hitler's personality by arguing that the top leadership, the middle leadership, and even the lower ranks of the Nazi movement devoted themselves to working towards the Führer's supposed wishes, whether or not he had ever expressed those wishes, in the hopes of gaining the Führer's approval. Kershaw depicts Hitler's leadership as charismatic, which emphasizes his profound influence on the audience, and so the audience—and thereby the German society as a whole—was acting under his very broad command.

=== Volker Ullrich ===
German historian and journalist Volker Ullrich (born 1943) wrote a two-volume biography of Hitler. The first edition was published in German in 2013 and was translated into English in 2016 (Hitler – A Biography, Volume 1: Ascent 1889–1939); the second was published in 2018 and appeared in English translation in 2020 (Hitler – A Biography. Volume II: Downfall 1939–1945). Ullrich depicts Hitler as a narcissist who was both clownish and deceitful and who rose to power using slick propaganda at a time the German elite was too dysfunctional to realize the danger he posed.

== Historikerstreit re Nazi Germany ==
The Historikerstreit ("historians' quarrel") was an intellectual and political controversy in the late 1980s in West Germany about the crimes of Nazi Germany, including their comparability with the crimes of the Soviet Union.

The Historikerstreit pitted right-wing against left-wing intellectuals. The positions taken by the right-wing intellectuals were largely based on the totalitarianism approach which takes a comparative approach to totalitarian states, while left-wing intellectuals argued that fascism was uniquely evil, referred to as the Sonderweg thesis and could not be equated with the crimes of Soviet communism. The former were accused by their critics of downplaying Nazi crimes, while the latter were accused by their critics of downplaying Soviet crimes. The debate attracted much media attention in West Germany, with its participants' frequently giving television interviews and writing op-ed pieces in newspapers. It flared up again briefly in 2000 when one of its leading figures, Ernst Nolte, was awarded the Konrad Adenauer Prize for science.

== See also ==
- Historiography of Germany
- Bibliography of Adolf Hitler
- Nazi foreign policy debate
- Appeasement
- Historiography of World War II
- Causes of World War II
- International relations (1919–1939)
- Germany–Soviet Union relations, 1918–1941
- Foreign policy of the Franklin D. Roosevelt administration
