= Hitler (Ullrich books) =

2-volume book collection by Volker Ullrich

First English editions

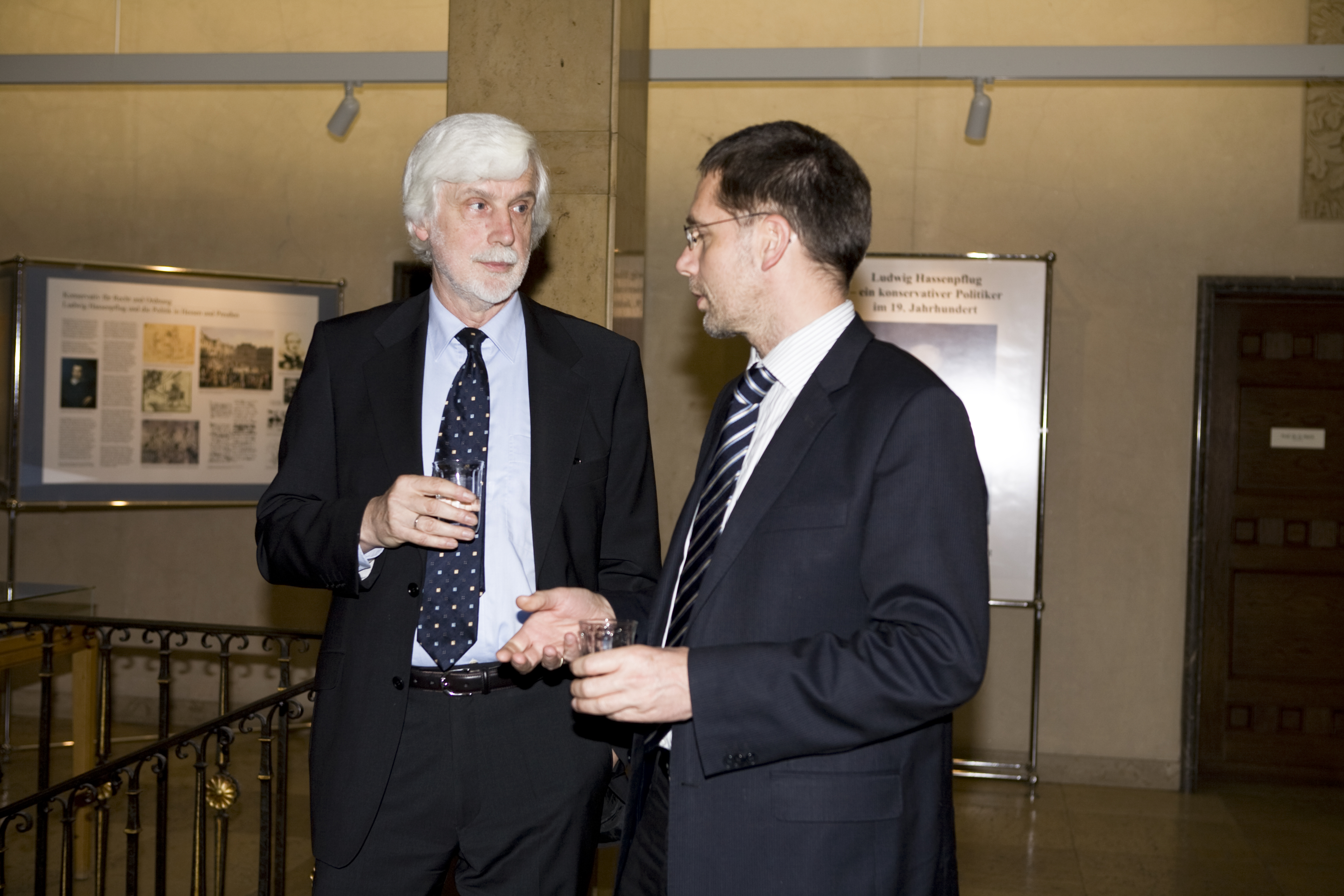
Ullrich (left) in 2008

Hitler is a collection of two volumes by Volker Ullrich. The book became a bestseller in Germany upon its publication. The Bodley Head bought the English publishing rights in 2013. Jefferson Chase translated both volumes into English.

== Contents ==
The books were originally published in German by S. Fischer Verlag. The first volume Hitler: Ascent, 1889–1939 (German: Adolf Hitler: Die Jahre des Aufstiegs 1889-1939), published in German in 2013, was published in English in 2016 by The Bodley Head and covers up to 1939. Volume I has 750 pages.

The second volume Hitler Vol II: Downfall 1939–45 (German: Adolf Hitler: Die Jahre des Untergangs 1939-1945) was published in English in 2020 by the same English publisher and covers the remainder of his biography.

== Reception ==
Simon Heffer of The Daily Telegraph gave the second volume four of five stars, praising its use of newly available historical material and concluding that it "is one of the most impressive Hitler biographies". Heffer argued that the book, particularly in regards to the genesis of the Holocaust, "regurgitates too much of the context of the war". Heffer also criticizes some editing choices, such as the usage of American English by a British publisher, and the decision to use the German edition's translation of the This was their finest hour speech, translated back into English, rather than using the original text.

Michiko Kakutani of The New York Times wrote that Volume I "offers a fascinating Shakespearean parable" regarding Adolf Hitler's rise to power and highlights how Hitler advanced his political career through "demagoguery, showmanship and nativist appeals to the masses". She stated that "there is little here that is substantially new".

Miranda Seymour of The Daily Telegraph stated that the author's portrayal of Hitler was "Janus-faced: an iron leader riddled with pitiful insecurity; a killer driven by the terror of personal oblivion". She gave the first volume five stars out of five. She described it as "a superb biography". She credited "Ullrich's refusal to buy into the idea – assiduously fostered by the Führer himself – that Hitler was invulnerable".

John Kampfner in The Observer wrote that it "is, by any measure, an outstanding study". Kampfner argued "the real strength of this book is in disentangling the personal story of man and monster."

== See also ==
- Historiography of Adolf Hitler
