= Bernhard Stempfle =

Catholic priest and early Nazi supporter

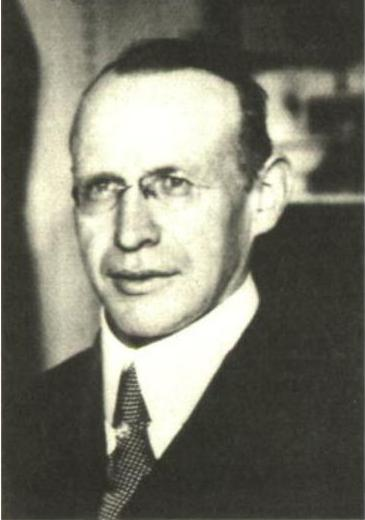
- Bernhard Stempfle in 1928
- Born: 17 April 1882; Munich, Kingdom of Bavaria
- Died: 1 July 1934 (aged 52); Nazi Germany

Bernhard Stempfle (17 April 1882 – 1 July 1934) was a Roman Catholic priest and journalist. He helped Adolf Hitler in the writing of Mein Kampf. He was murdered in the Night of the Long Knives.

== Biography ==
Stempfle was born in Munich. He entered the priesthood in 1904. He joined the Hieronymite order (the Poor Hermits of Saint Jerome) in Italy. In the years leading up to the First World War, he wrote for the Corriere della Sera and various other German and Italian papers. Following the outbreak of war, he returned to Munich, performed pastoral work at the university, and established close contacts with Reform Catholic elements (i.e., elements that opposed political Catholicism, and politicians they regarded as too willing to make compromises with the Jews and "atheistic" socialists) in the city, especially the nationalistic Hofklerus at St. Kajetan. In 1919, he first began publishing in the Münchener Beobachter, where he wrote relentlessly on the destructive influence of Jewish atheism and on the moral acceptability and necessity of ruthless persecution of Jews, even as far as pogroms, pursued in defense of the faith and institutions of the Catholic Church, and the example provided throughout the years by antisemitic leaders within the hierarchy. By 1920, he was a leader of the secretive anti-republican Organisation Kanzler (Orka) and by 1923 he was the chief editor of the antisemitic daily Miesbacher Anzeiger and a leading journalistic figure within the broader volkisch-antisemitic movement in Catholic Bavaria. Stempfle was involved in numerous feme murders, particularly the murder of Wilhelm Hörnlein.

He was also a regular confidant of Hitler. In the same year he left the order because of its lack of members and the order was dissolved. Although he no longer had priestly functions after that, he was still referred to as "Father".

As an increasingly prominent Nazi figure, he was the target of Social Democratic satire and portrayed as the "anti-Semitic bishop" of Miesbach. He idealized Hitler and attacked the BVP, the Zentrum, and their alleged Jewish backers. According to Hitler's personal photographer Heinrich Hoffmann, Stempfle frequently visited Munich and was a member of Hitler's inner circle, joining Hitler "at his corner table at the Café Heck", and advising him on religious issues.

Multiple authors and eyewitnesses, such as Konrad Heiden and Nazi "apostate" Otto Strasser, report that not only did Stempfle correct the galley proofs of Mein Kampf, but that he indeed copy-edited certain passages. Historian and Hitler biographer Alan Bullock likewise discusses this. (See the German version of this Wikipedia entry for more details.)

In 1934, he was imprisoned in Dachau concentration camp. In June, his body was found in the woods near Harlaching, several kilometers away. The cause of his death is unclear: some accounts blame a broken neck and others attribute his death to gunshots in the heart "while trying to escape". The motive behind his murder is also unclear. In some accounts, it is considered possible that he was regarded as having too much information about Hitler's past and personal life, especially about the death of Hitler's niece, Geli Raubal. Other accounts hold that Stempfle was perhaps killed over his criticism of SS general Christian Weber for immorality and running a brothel.
