= Richard Steigmann-Gall =

American historian

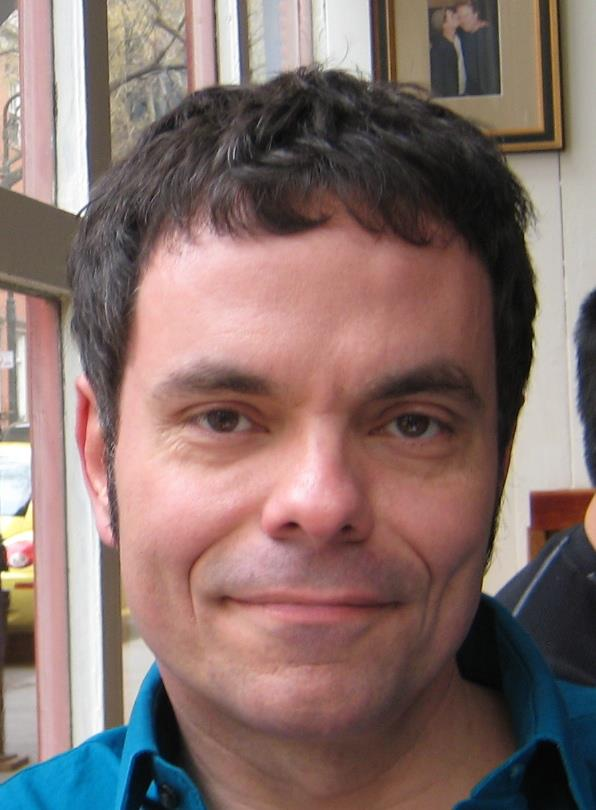
- Born: October 3, 1965 (age 61)

Academic background
- Education: University of Michigan; University of Toronto

Academic work
- Discipline: history Jewish studies
- Institutions: Kent State University
- Notable works: The Holy Reich

Richard Steigmann-Gall (born October 3, 1965) is an associate professor of history at Kent State University, and the former director of the Jewish Studies Program from 2004 to 2010.

== Life ==
=== Education ===
Steigmann-Gall received a BA in history with Honors in 1989 from the University of Michigan. He then earned an MA in European History in 1992 from the same institution, under the supervision of Geoff Eley. In 1999, he completed his PhD in European History at the University of Toronto with the thesis The Holy Reich': Religious Dimensions of Nazi Ideology, 1919-1945, under the doctoral committee of James Retallack, Michael Marrus, and C. Thomas McIntire.

=== Career ===
Richard Steigmann-Gall's academic employment history includes positions at Kent State University, St. Francis Xavier University, the University of Toronto, and the University of Michigan.

His teaching career began at the University of Michigan, where he was a teaching assistant in the Department of History in the spring of 1992. He later served as a teaching assistant at the University of Toronto during the fall semesters of 1996 and 1997, and as a summer instructor in 1999. From July 1999 to June 2000, he worked as an assistant professor in the Department of History at St. Francis Xavier University. He joined the Department of History at Kent State University as an assistant professor in July 2000, and was appointed associate professor in July 2005. Additionally, he served as the director of the university's Jewish Studies Program from July 2004 to June 2010.

== Research ==
On September 30, 2009, Steigmann-Gall was unwittingly featured on the History Channel in a sensationalist documentary discussing Hitler's religious views.

Since 2016, Steigmann-Gall has turned his attention to the question of fascism in the United States. He published a scholarly article named "Star-Spangled Fascism" in the journal Social History that explores the traditions of American historical writing and the ways in which the American far right in the period between World War I and II can be called fascist in spite of these traditions. For the last several years, he has turned to public commentary on the question of fascism in contemporary American politics. His articles on this can be found in Tikkun, the Huffington Post, Politico, and Jacobin.

== Works ==
Thesis

- Steigmann-Gall, Richard (1999). The Holy Reich': Religious Dimensions of Nazi Ideology, 1919-1945 (PDF) (Dissertation, The University of Toronto).

Books

- ————————— (2003). The Holy Reich': Religious Dimensions of Nazi Ideology, 1919-1945 (PDF). Cambridge and New York: Cambridge University Press. ISBN 0-521-82371-4.
- ————————— (2005). O Santo Reich. Concepções Nazistas do Cristianismo 1919-1945 (in Portuguese). Rio de Janeiro: Imago Editora.
- ————————— (2005). Il Sacro Reich. Le concezioni naziste del cristianesimo (in Italian). Milan: Boroli Editore.
- ————————— (2007). El Reich sagrado. Concepciones nazis sobre el cristianismo (in Spanish). Madrid: Akal Ediciones.

Articles

- ————————— (2007). "Christianity and the Nazi Movement: A response to critics" (PDF). Journal of Contemporary History. 42 (2). SAGE Publications: 185–211. doi:10.1177/0022009407075560.

=== The Holy Reich ===
In 2003, Steigmann-Gall published The Holy Reich through Cambridge University Press, which explored Nazi conceptions of Christianity. The Holy Reich argues that the Nazi Party was not anti-Christian as popularly understood, nor was it in any sense a paganist movement. Rather, Steigmann-Gall writes that many in the Nazi Party leadership believed themselves and their movement to be inherently Christian (positive Christianity).

The Holy Reich has been translated into Spanish, Portuguese, and Italian. A symposium on the book was published by the Journal of Contemporary History in 2007.

== See also ==
- Adolf Hitler's religious views
- German Christians (movement)
- Positive Christianity
- Religion in Nazi Germany
- Religious aspects of Nazism
