= Hitler and Stalin: Parallel Lives =

1991 book by Alan Bullock

- Cover of the first edition
- Author: Alan Bullock
- Language: English
- Subjects: Adolf Hitler; Joseph Stalin
- Publisher: HarperCollins
- Publication date: 1991
- Media type: Print (hardcover and paperback)
- Pages: 1158
- ISBN: 0-00-686198-9

Hitler and Stalin: Parallel Lives is a 1991 book by the British historian Alan Bullock, in which the author puts the German dictator Adolf Hitler in perspective with the Soviet dictator Joseph Stalin.

Bullock had already written a biography of Hitler in 1952 (Hitler: A Study in Tyranny). In Hitler and Stalin, he analyses the inner doctrines that made victory and unparalleled terror possible. While analyzing the lives of Hitler and Stalin, he prompts the reader with the importance of the German-Russian axis in the first half of the century.

The title and structure of the book refer to the ancient Greek writer Plutarch and his Parallel Lives.
