= Volker Ullrich =

German historian, journalist and writer

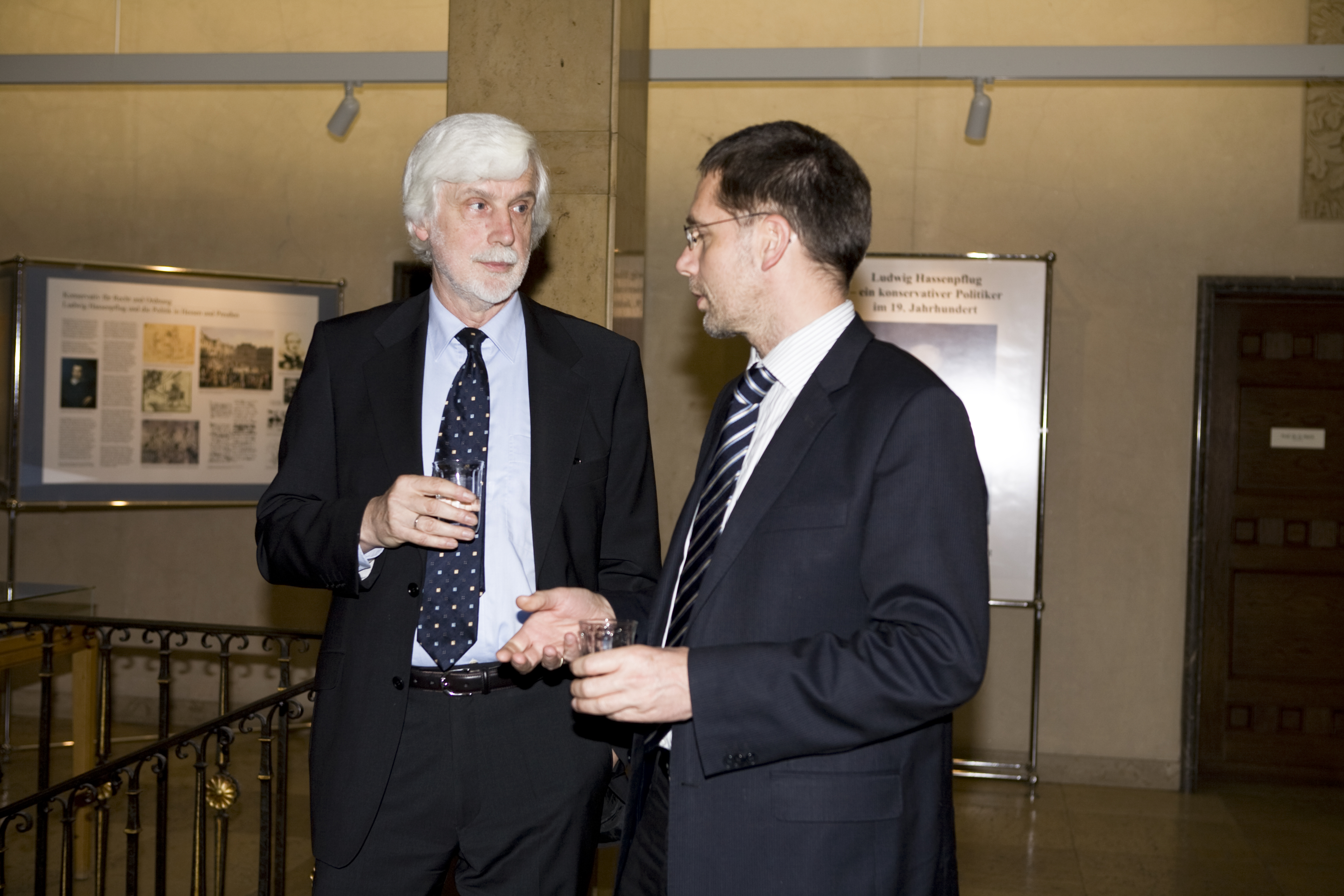
- Ullrich (left) in 2008
- Born: 21 June 1943 (age 83); Celle, Lower Saxony, Nazi Germany
- Education: University of Hamburg
- Occupation: Historian · journalist · author

Volker Ullrich (born 21 June 1943) is a German historian and journalist.

== Career ==
Volker Ullrich was born in Celle, Lower Saxony, Germany. He studied history, literature, philosophy and education at the University of Hamburg. From 1966 to 1969 he was assistant to the Egmont Zechlin Professor. He graduated in 1975 after a dissertation on the Hamburg labour movement of the early 20th century, after which he worked as a school teacher in Hamburg. He was, for a time, a lecturer in politics at the Lüneburg University, and in 1988 he became a research fellow at Hamburg's Foundation for 20th-Century Social History. In 1990 Ullrich became the head of the political section of the weekly newspaper Die Zeit.

Ullrich has published articles and books on 19th- and 20th-century history. In 1996 he reviewed the thesis postulated in Daniel Goldhagen's book Hitler's Willing Executioners that provoked fresh debate among historians.

In 1992 he was awarded the Alfred Kerr Prize for literary criticism, and, in 2008, received an honorary doctorate from the University of Jena.

== Publications (selection) ==
- The Hamburg labour movement from the eve of the First World War to the Revolution of 1918. Luedke, University of Hamburg, dissertation 1976
- The Nervous Superpower: The Rise and Fall of the German Empire from 1871 to 1918. S. Fischer, Frankfurt 1997, ISBN 3-10-086001-2
- Napoleon. A biography. Rowohlt Verlag, Reinbek 2004, ISBN 3-498-06882-2
- Bismarck (Life & Times). Haus Publishing 2008, ISBN 1904950841
- The Kreisauer Circle. Rowohlt Verlag, Reinbek 2008, ISBN 3-499-50701-3
- Hitler - A Biography, Volume 1: Ascent 1889-1939. S. Fischer Verlag 2013, ISBN 3100860055 (German edition). English translation: London The Bodley Head 2016, ISBN 978-1-847-92285-4
- Hitler - A Biography, Volume 2: Downfall 1939-45 London The Bodley Head 2020, ISBN 978-1-847-92287-8
- Eight Days in May: The Final Collapse of the Third Reich, Liveright, 2021 ISBN 978-1-63149827-5
- Germany 1923: Hyperinflation, Hitler’s Putsch, and Democracy in Crisis, Liveright, 2023 ISBN 978-132409346-6
- Fateful Hours: The Collapse of the Weimar Republic, W. W. Norton & Co., 2025 ISBN 9781324110545
