= Hitler: A Study in Tyranny =

1952 book by Alan Bullock

- Author: Alan Bullock
- Language: English
- Publisher: Odhams Press Limited
- Publication date: 1952
- Publication place: United Kingdom
- Media type: Print (hardcover and paperback)
- Pages: 776

Hitler: A Study in Tyranny is a 1952 biography of the Nazi dictator Adolf Hitler by British historian Alan Bullock. It was the first comprehensive biography of Hitler. A revised edition was published in 1962.

== Reception ==
In 1992, The New York Times wrote that it "remains the standard biography of the dictator and a widely respected work on the Nazi movement in general." In 1998, the Hitler expert Ian Kershaw described the book as a "masterpiece". In his 2007 book Cultural Amnesia, the critic Clive James wrote, "Books about Hitler are without number, but after more than 60 years, the first one to read is still Alan Bullock's Hitler: A Study in Tyranny."

The book has been criticised for its reliance on the works of Albert Speer and Hermann Rauschning, which it treats as authentic eyewitness testimony and innocent of ideological agenda, but is rejected as unreliable by some scholars, such as Theodor Schieder. Many of Bullock's statements – as is the case with his British rival Hugh Trevor-Roper and later German historians Joachim Fest and Klaus Hildebrand – are thus "incorrect, or at least in need of serious nuancing". Bullock's portrayal of Hitler as a cynic is argued to derive from the main thesis of Rauschning's The Revolution of Nihilism, which is that National Socialism had no ideological content and amounted to a nihilist pursuit of power. Bullock notably later changed his mind and acknowledged in the late 1990s that a providentialist form of ideology was central to Hitler's actions.

== See also ==
- List of books by or about Adolf Hitler
- Psychopathography of Adolf Hitler

== Bibliography ==
- Nilsson, Mikael (2024). Christianity in Hitler's Ideology: The Role of Jesus in National Socialism. Cambridge: Cambridge University Press. doi:10.1017/9781009314961. ISBN 978-1-009-31495-4.
