= Positive Christianity =

Nazi movement which fused racial purity and Christianity

Flag of the German Christians (Deutsche Christen), a positive Christian movement of the German Protestant denomination

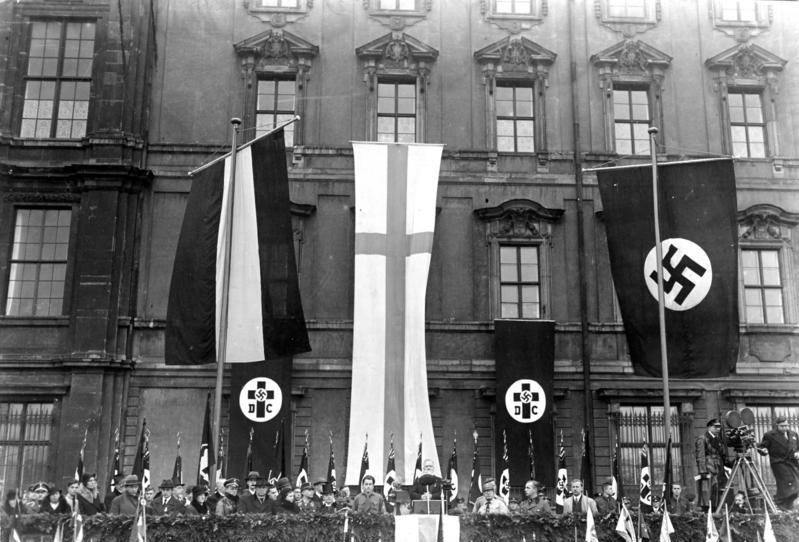
German Christians celebrating "Luther Day" in Berlin in 1933. Speech by Protestant bishop Joachim Hossenfelder

Positive Christianity (German: positives Christentum) was a religious movement within Nazi Germany which promoted the belief that the racial purity of the German people should be maintained by mixing racialistic Nazi ideology with either fundamental or significant elements of Nicene Christianity. Adolf Hitler used the term in point 24 (Note: Point 24 of the National Socialist Programme reads: We demand freedom of religion for all religious denominations within the state so long as they do not endanger its existence or oppose the moral senses of the Germanic race. The Party as such advocates the standpoint of a positive Christianity without binding itself confessionally to any one denomination. It combats the Jewish-materialistic spirit within and around us, and is convinced that a lasting recovery of our nation can only succeed from within on the framework: The good of the state before the good of the individual.) of the 1920 Nazi Party Platform, stating: "the Party as such represents the viewpoint of Positive Christianity without binding itself to any particular denomination". The Nazi movement had been hostile to Germany's established churches. The new Nazi idea of Positive Christianity allayed the fears of Germany's Christian majority by implying that the Nazi movement was not anti-Christian. That said, in 1937, Hans Kerrl, the Reich Minister for Church Affairs, explained that "Positive Christianity" was not "dependent upon the Apostle's Creed", nor was it dependent on "faith in Christ as the son of God", upon which Christianity relied; rather, it was represented by the Nazi Party, with "[t]he Führer ... the herald of a new revelation."

Hitler's public presentation of Positive Christianity as a traditional Christian faith differed. Despite Hitler's insistence on a unified peace with the Christian churches, to accord with Nazi antisemitism, Positive Christianity advocates also sought to distance themselves from the Jewish origins of Christ and the Christian Bible.

Hitler consistently self-identified as a Christian in public, and even on occasion as a Catholic, specifically throughout his entire political career, despite criticising biblical figures. He identified himself as a Christian in a 12 April 1922 speech. However, historians, including Ian Kershaw and Laurence Rees, characterise his acceptance of the term "positive Christianity" and his political involvement in religious policy as being driven by opportunism, and pragmatic recognition of the political importance of the Christian churches in Germany. Nevertheless, efforts by the regime to impose a Nazified "positive Christianity" on a state-controlled German Evangelical Church essentially failed, and it resulted in the formation of the dissident Confessing Church, whose members saw great danger to Germany from the "new religion" being imposed on it. In the 1937 papal encyclical Mit brennender Sorge, the Catholic Church also denounced that the ideology contained idolatry of race, people, and the state.

Official Nazi ideologist Alfred Rosenberg played an important role in the development of "positive Christianity", which he conceived in discord with both Rome and the Protestant churches, whose doctrines he called "negative Christianity". Peculiarly, Eastern Orthodoxy had not been criticised by Rosenberg, and Richard Steigmann-Gall questions whether or not this seemingly specific opposition to Western Christianity made Rosenberg a genuine anti-Christian.

Rosenberg conceived of Positive Christianity as a transitional faith to bring Christianity toward Nazi antisemitism, and amid the failure of the regime's efforts to control Protestantism through the agency of the pro-Nazi "German Christians", Rosenberg, along with fellow radicals Robert Ley and Baldur von Schirach, backed the neo-pagan "German Faith Movement", which completely rejected traditional Judeo-Christian conceptions of God from Western thought.

During the war, Rosenberg drafted a plan for the future of religion in Germany, which would see a Positive Christian Reich influenced by Germanic paganism conduct the "expulsion of the foreign Christian religions", the replacement of the Bible as the supreme religious authority with Mein Kampf as the holy scripture of Positive Christianity, and the replacement of the Christian cross with the swastika as the universal symbol of European Christianity in Nazified Christian churches.

== Theological and doctrinal aspects ==
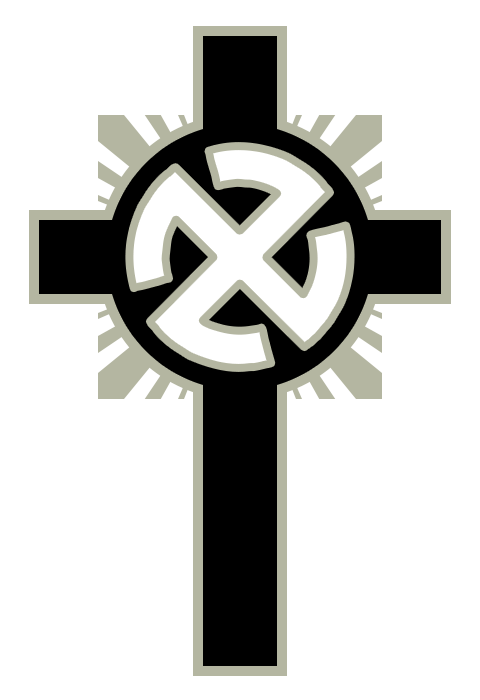
A symbol used by the German Christians

Adherents of positive Christianity argued that traditional Christianity emphasised the passive rather than the active aspects of Jesus's life, stressing his miraculous birth, his suffering, his sacrifice on the cross, and other-worldly redemption. Although Hitler publicly affirmed such doctrines and did not deny them in Mein Kampf, his inner circle party intellectuals such as Alfred Rosenberg (who himself taught in his book that Jesus followed an early form of Second Temple Judaism) wanted to replace this doctrine of such emphasis on biblical traditionalism instead with a "positive" emphasis on Jesus as an active preacher, organiser, and fighter who opposed the Rabbinic Judaism of his day embodied by the Pharisees and Sadducees. At various points in the Nazi regime, attempts were made to replace conventional Christianity with its "positive" alternative.

Positive Christianity differed from traditional Nicene Christianity in that it had these main tactical objectives:

- A selective process of application regarding the Christian Bible wherein the compilers rejected deemed impurities "invented by Jews" to "corrupt" the Christian faith from the "Jewish-written" parts of the Bible. Among the most extreme adherents of this movement, this included the entire Old Testament (Hebrew Bible).
- Claimed racial "Aryanhood" and ethnoreligious non-Jewishness for Jesus, who was instead called a "Nordic Amorite".
- Promoted the political objective of national unity, to overcome confessional differences, to establish "national Catholicism" and eliminate all Catholicism functioning in Germany outside the Nazi State, and unite Protestantism into a single unitary positive Christian state church nominally controlled directly by the "German Messiah" Adolf Hitler himself.
- Also encouraged followers to support the creation of an Aryan Homeland for all Germanic peoples.

Under Hitler's regime, in the Reich Protestant churches the New Testament was also altered: the genealogies of Jesus depicting the Davidic descent Christians believe Jesus claimed, as well as Jewish names and places, and portions of quotations from the Old Testament (Hebrew Bible) were removed unless they showed Jews in a bad light; references to Jewish prophecies Christians believe Jesus fulfilled were removed; and Jesus was reworked into a militaristic, heroic figure fighting the Jews using Nazified language.

== Origins of the idea ==
Although positive Christianity is explicitly associated with the racial ideology of Nazi Germany, its theological underpinnings long predate the latter. The earliest form of Christianity that resembled positive Christianity was the 2nd-century Marcionite sect, which rejected the Hebrew Bible's canonicity for Christians and associated it with Judaism. However, this stemmed from a rejection of the Jewish religion in favor of Gnostic theology rather than a racially-based hatred of the Jews as a people. In the 1200s, the Cathars in France viewed the Old Testament (Hebrew Bible) God as an evil demiurge who was a separate being from the New Testament God. However, despite their dislike for the Old Testament (Hebrew Bible) god, the Cathars had little hostility towards the Jews as people, and the Catholic Church persecuted the Cathars in part because the Church felt they were too friendly towards Jews.

Steigmann-Gall traces the origins of positive Christianity to higher criticism of the nineteenth century, with its emphasis on the distinction between the historical Jesus and the divine Jesus of theology. In those schools of thought, the saviour figure of orthodox Christianity was very different from the historical Galilean preacher. While many such scholars sought to place Jesus in the context of ancient Judaism, some writers reconstructed a historical Jesus who corresponded to racialist and antisemitic ideology. In the writings of such antisemites as Émile-Louis Burnouf, Houston Stewart Chamberlain, and Paul de Lagarde, Jesus was redefined as an Aryan hero who struggled against Jews and Judaism. Consistent with their origins in higher criticism, such writers often either rejected or minimised the miraculous aspects of Gospel narratives, reducing the crucifixion to a tragic coda to Jesus's life rather than its prefigured culmination. Both Burnouf and Chamberlain argued that the population of Galilee was racially distinct from that of Judea. Lagarde insisted that German Christianity must become "national" in character.

Various historians credit the origins of positive Christianity more to the political acumen and opportunism of the Nazi leadership. Leading Nazis like Heinrich Himmler, Alfred Rosenberg, Martin Bormann, and Joseph Goebbels, backed by Hitler, were hostile to Christianity and ultimately planned to de-Christianise Germany. However, Germany had been Christian for over a thousand years, and Hitler recognised the practical reality of the political significance of the national churches in Germany and determined that any moves against the churches must be made in stages. In the words of Paul Berben, positive Christianity, therefore, came to be advocated as a "term that could be overlaid with any interpretation required, depending on the circumstances," and the party declared itself for religious freedom provided this liberty did not "endanger the State or clash with the views of the 'Germanic Race'".

Historian Derek Hastings has written about the Catholic roots in the nationalistic and disaffected Catholic circles of Munich, of the explicit endorsement of positive Christianity in the Nazi party program. This group helped to shape its tenets, suspicious as they were of both ultramontanism and political Catholicism.

In Mein Kampf, Hitler reassured his readers that both Christian denominations (Catholicism and Protestantism) were valid bases for the German people, provided the churches did not intervene in state affairs. In private, it is documented that Hitler scorned Pauline Christianity to his friends such as Bormann and played himself off as a type of Jesusist to him. Still, when out campaigning for power in Germany, he publicly made statements in favour of the religion. "The most persuasive explanation of these statements", wrote Laurence Rees,

is that Hitler, as a politician, simply recognised the practical reality of the world he inhabited ... Had Hitler distanced himself or his movement too much from Christianity it is all but impossible to see how he could ever have been successful in a free election. Thus his relationship in public to Christianity – indeed his relationship to religion in general – was opportunistic. There is no evidence that Hitler himself, in his personal life, ever expressed any individual belief in the basic tenets of the Christian church.

== Relationship with the Nazi Party ==
Positive Christianity was, by design, entirely reliant on the leadership and ideology of the Nazi movement; Nazi journals such as Der Stürmer and Völkischer Beobachter were major sources of the dissemination and promotion of positive Christian ideals, stressing the "Nordic" character of Jesus. Despite these radical divergences from preexisting doctrines, the party was also careful to stress that positive Christianity was not intended to be a third confession, nor was it supposed to contradict the traditional theologies of the established churches. As early as 1920, the Nazis proclaimed in their 25-point program that the "Party as such advocates the standpoint of a positive Christianity without binding itself confessionally to any one denomination. It combats the Jewish-materialistic spirit within and around us". Despite this proclamation, a number of Nazis openly challenged the established churches.

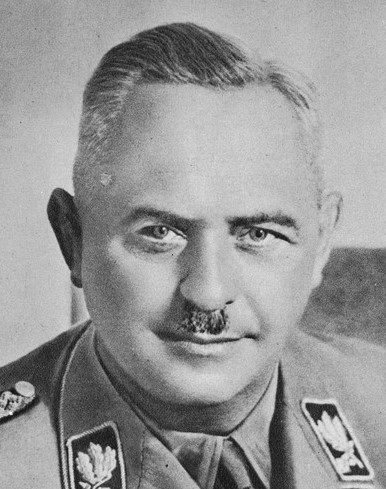
Hanns Kerrl. As Reichsminister of Church Affairs, he described Hitler as the "herald of a new revelation" and that "positive Christianity" was not dependent on the Apostles' Creed or belief in Jesus as the son of God.

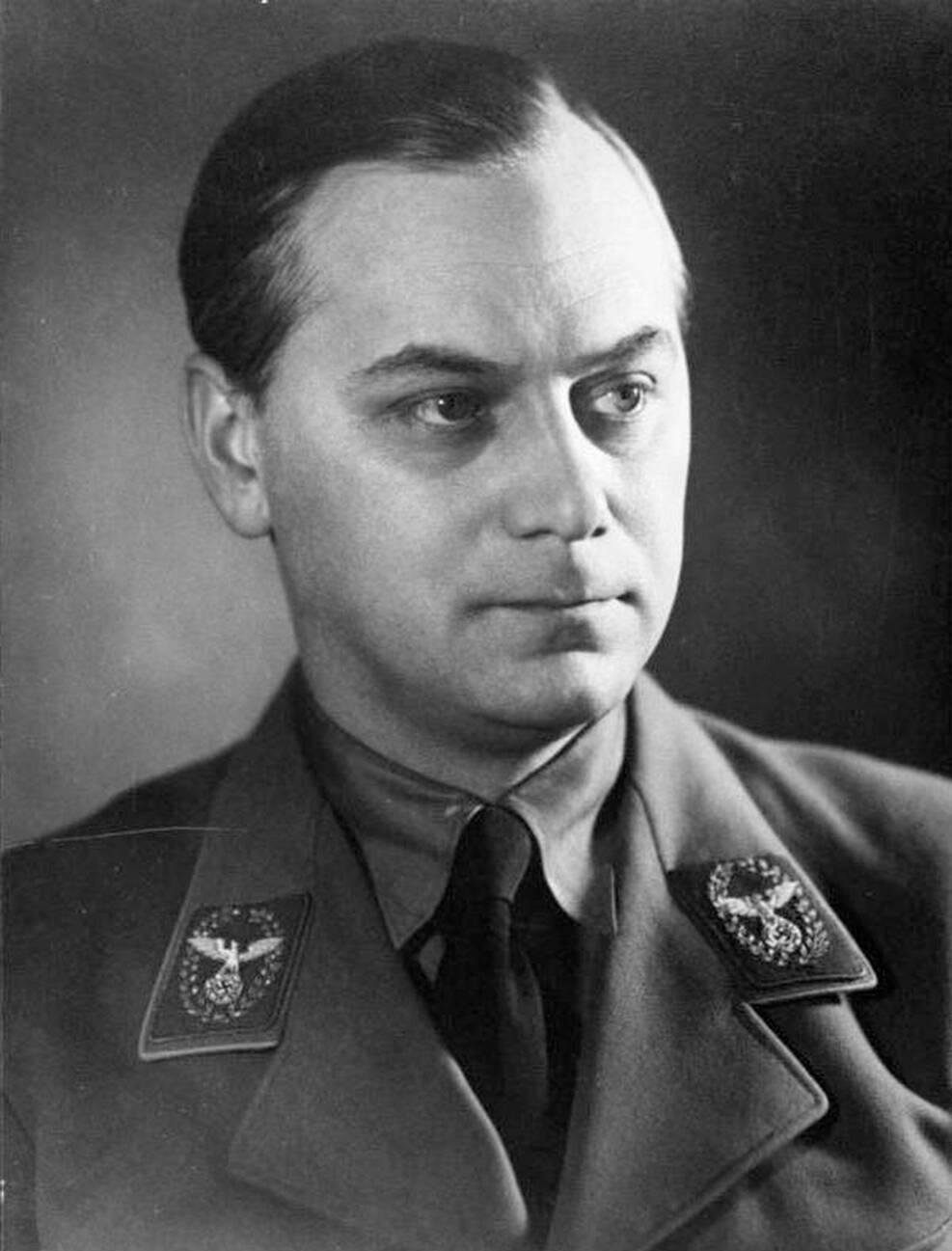
Alfred Rosenberg was "the Führer's Delegate for the Entire Intellectual and Philosophical Education and Instruction for the National Socialist Party". A proponent of positive Christianity, he planned the "extermination of the foreign Christian faiths imported into Germany", and he also planned to replace the Bible and the Christian cross with Mein Kampf and the swastika.

Alfred Rosenberg, editor of Völkischer Beobachter, wrote The Myth of the Twentieth Century, in which he argued that the Catholic and Protestant churches had distorted Christianity in such a way that the "heroic" and "Germanic" aspects of Jesus's life had been ignored. For Rosenberg, positive Christianity was a transitional ideology that would pave the way to build a new, fully racialist faith from the Hitlerian Reich Church. Instead of the cross, its symbol was the orb of the sun in the form of a sun cross, and in principle, it was the elevation of the Nordic race, a rejection of Old Europe's traditional divine revelation dogmas, and the promotion of a German God. For Rosenberg the Aryan-Nordic race was divine, and god was in the blood and its culture was the kingdom of heaven, in contrast the Jewish race was evil and it was a satanic counter race against the divine Aryan-Nordic race. Hitler approved of the book's work in general and emphasised the desirability of positive Christianity, yet distanced himself from much of Rosenberg's more radical ideas sidelined to the lunatic fringe within his movement, wishing to retain the support of the conservative Christian electorate and social elite. Hitler's official brand of state-sanctioned Positive Christianity incorporated Protestant and Catholic variant denominations into the Reich Church.

As an aspect of Gleichschaltung, the regime planned to nazify the Protestant Church in Germany (Evangelical Church) by unifying the separate 28 state churches under a single national church that would be controlled by the German Christians faction. However, the subjugation of the Protestant churches proved to be more difficult than Hitler had envisaged. In 1933, the "German Christians" wanted Nazi doctrines on race and leadership to be applied to a Reich Church, but they only had around 3,000 of Germany's 17,000 pastors. In July, church leaders submitted a constitution for a Reich Church, which the Reichstag approved. The Church Federation proposed that the well-qualified pastor Friedrich von Bodelschwingh should be the new Reich Bishop, but Hitler proposed that his friend Ludwig Müller, a Nazi and a former naval chaplain, should serve as the new Reich Bishop. The Nazis terrorised supporters of Bodelschwingh, and they also dissolved various church organisations, ensuring the election of Müller as the new Reich Bishop. Müller's heretical views of St Paul and his arguments against the Semitic origins of Jesus and the Bible quickly alienated sections of the Protestant church. Pastor Martin Niemöller responded by founding the Pastors' Emergency League, a Protestant denomination that re-affirmed the Bible. Some clergymen who opposed the Nazi regime joined the movement, and it grew into the Confessing Church.

Müller was elected the first Reichsbischof of the new Reichskirche (the so-called German Evangelical Church) in September 1933. However, the German Christians' theological initiatives (Note: These pro-Nazi initiatives included the introduction of the Aryan paragraph, which excluded converted Jews, and the attempt to dispense with the Old Testament in church services.) were met with resistance from many pastors, most notably Niemöller, whose Pastors' Emergency League was supported by nearly 40 percent of the Evangelical pastors. Following this failure, Hitler backtracked on his attempts to nazify the churches directly, and he eventually became disinterested in supporting the "German Christians".

The German Faith Movement, which was founded by Jakob Wilhelm Hauer, adopted a more thoroughly Aryanised form of the ideology to support its claim that it represented the essence of the "Protestant" spirit; it mixed aspects of Christianity with ideas which were derived from "Aryan" religions such as Vedicism and "Aryo"-Persian religiosity (Manicheanism, etc.). It attempted to separate Nazi officials from church affiliations, banning nativity plays, and calling for an end to daily prayers in schools.

By 1934, the Confessing Church had declared itself the legitimate Protestant Church of Germany. Despite his closeness to Hitler, Müller had failed to unite Protestantism in a single Nazi-dominated Church. In 1935, the Nazis arrested 700 Confessing pastors, and Müller resigned. To instigate a new effort to coordinate the Protestant churches, Hitler appointed another friend, Hanns Kerrl, to Minister for Church Affairs. A relative moderate, Kerrl initially had some success in this regard, but amidst continuing protests against Nazi policies by the Confessing Church, he accused churchmen of failing to appreciate the Nazi doctrine of "Race, blood and soil" and he also gave the following explanation for the Nazi conception of positive Christianity, telling a group of submissive clergy:

The Party stands on the basis of Positive Christianity, and positive Christianity is National Socialism ... National Socialism is the doing of God's will ... God's will reveals itself in German blood ... Dr Zoellner and [Catholic Bishop of Münster] Count Galen have tried to make clear to me that Christianity consists in faith in Christ as the son of God. That makes me laugh... No, Christianity is not dependent upon the Apostle's [sic] Creed ... True Christianity is represented by the party, and the German people are now called by the party and especially the Fuehrer to a real Christianity ... the Fuehrer is the herald of a new revelation".

== Demise ==
The Nazi policy of interference in Protestantism did not achieve its aims. The majority of German Protestants did not side with either the "German Christians", or the Confessing Church. Both groups also struggled with significant internal disagreements and divisions. Mary Fulbrook wrote in her history of Germany:

The Nazis eventually gave up their attempt to co-opt Christianity, and made little pretence at concealing their contempt for Christian beliefs, ethics and morality. Unable to comprehend that some Germans genuinely wanted to combine commitment to Christianity and Nazism, some members of the SS even came to view German Christians as almost more of a threat than the Confessing Church.

With the fall of the Nazi regime in 1945, Positive Christianity fell into obscurity as a movement.

== See also ==
- Antisemitism in Christianity
- Catharism
- Catholic Church and Nazi Germany
- Christian Identity
- Christianity and Judaism
- Clerical fascism
- Institute for the Study and Elimination of Jewish Influence on German Church Life
- Kirchenkampf
- Marcionism
- Nazi persecution of the Catholic Church in Germany
- Persecution of Jehovah's Witnesses in Nazi Germany
- Pope Pius XII and the Holocaust
- Race and appearance of Jesus
- Religion in Nazi Germany
- Religious aspects of Nazism
- Religious views of Adolf Hitler
- State Shintoism
- The Foundations of the Nineteenth Century
