= A. James Reimer =

Canadian Mennonite theologian

- Born: Allen James Reimer; 10 August 1942; Morris, Manitoba, Canada
- Died: 28 August 2010 (aged 68); Waterloo, Ontario, Canada
- Spouse: Margaret Loewen Reimer (m. 1968)

Academic background
- Education: Canadian Mennonite Bible College; University of Manitoba; University of Toronto
- Thesis: Theological Method and Political Ethics (1983)
- Doctoral advisor: Gregory Baum
- Influences: George Grant

Academic work
- Discipline: Theology; religious studies
- Sub-discipline: Political theology; systematic theology
- School or tradition: Anabaptism
- Institutions: Conrad Grebel University College
- Main interests: 20th-century German Protestant thought; Mennonite theology

Allen James Reimer (August 10, 1942 – August 28, 2010) was a Canadian Mennonite theologian who held a dual academic appointment as Professor of Religious Studies and Christian Theology at Conrad Grebel University College, a member college of the University of Waterloo, and at the Toronto School of Theology, a consortium of divinity schools federated with the University of Toronto. At the University of Waterloo's fall 2008 convocation, he was named Distinguished Professor Emeritus, an honor seldom bestowed on retired faculty.

== Early life and education ==
Born on 10 August 1942 in Morris, Manitoba, Reimer was raised in Altona. As a teen, he was baptized in the local Mennonite church. He held undergraduate degrees from Canadian Mennonite Bible College (1963; now Canadian Mennonite University) and the University of Manitoba (1971); he also spent a year studying at Union Theological Seminary in New York City (1971–72) before moving to the University of Toronto, where he earned an MA in history (1974) and a PhD in theology (1983), the latter degree conferred by the University of St. Michael's College, a federated university of the University of Toronto. His doctoral dissertation, directed by Gregory Baum, was a comparative and contrasting study of the political ramifications of theology in the respective thinking of Emanuel Hirsch and Paul Tillich.

== Theology ==
Reimer's own theology was not typically Mennonite (vis-à-vis John Howard Yoder), in that his point of departure was not the Sermon on the Mount but the classical imagination of trinitarian orthodoxy. Though he was deeply concerned with Christian social ethics, he insisted that ethics must have a ground external to itself. The triune God, for Reimer, constituted such ground. Whereas Mennonites have been historically critical of the dominant culture, Reimer's later work sought to develop a positive understanding of culture, law, public life and civil institutions.

While writing his doctoral dissertation, Reimer became deeply troubled and conflicted about the theology of Emanuel Hirsch, a German Christian nationalist and Nazi sympathizer. Fearing that he was being swayed by Hirsch's arguments, Reimer sought to offset Hirsch's influence by aligning himself more concretely with left of centre politics. He joined the New Democratic Party and was an active party member for several years before finally resigning his membership over certain of the party's socio-ethical positions, particularly a woman's right to choose. Today, Reimer's overall political vision remains left of centre. Though he is a pacifist, he has argued that God's activity in the world cannot be reduced to any one ethical ideology; otherwise transcendence becomes domesticated.

Reimer was quite productive as an academic. He published numerous articles in various journals; select articles have been compiled to form the content of two of his books: Mennonites and Classical Theology, and Paul Tillich: Theologian of Nature, Culture and Politics. His very first book was a revision of his doctoral dissertation, titled The Emanuel Hirsch and Paul Tillich Debate: A Study in the Political Ramifications of Theology. He also coedited a compendium of essays on the Frankfurt School of critical theory. His areas of expertise included Anabaptist-Mennonite theology, Christian ethics of war and peace, and nineteenth- and twentieth-century German Protestant thought (including the theology of Dietrich Bonhoeffer, Paul Tillich, and the German church struggle during the Nazi regime). Over the years Reimer directed several theses and dissertations on these and other related topics.

A. James Reimer was an active churchman who accepted many preaching and teaching assignments in the Mennonite Church for over forty-five years, and was actively engaged in ecumenical and inter-faith encounters. In 2007, a Festschrift was published in honor of Reimer.

On 28 August 2010, Reimer died at his Waterloo home. He is survived by his wife Margaret Loewen Reimer, an academic with a PhD in English, and a former editor of the Canadian Mennonite, and their three children.

== See also ==
- List of University of Waterloo people
- Mennonite Church Canada
