= Karl Fezer =

German Lutheran theologian (1891–1960)

Karl Fezer (February 18, 1891 in Geislingen – January 13, 1960 in Stuttgart), was a German Lutheran theologian.

== Biography ==
After his training Fezer was initially a curate in Leinfelden-Echterdingen, then head pastor in Stuttgart and Tübingen. From 1926 to 1959 he was the Professor for Practical Theology at the University of Tübingen. He was Chair of the Protestant Seminary there from 1931 to 1959 while simultaneously Rector of the University from 1933 to 1959. For a short time he was the head of the German Christians movement which sought to institute Nazi racial policies in the German Protestant Church. He petitioned for membership in the Nazi Party in May 1933. In 1933 he assumed leadership of the German Christian Student Union. He served as a delegate to the "Conference to Resolve the Question of the Church" in 1933. He served as the Interim Leader of the German Evangelical Church after the victory of the Nazi-led German Christians in Church elections across Germany. Despite his relationship with Nazism and cooperation with the Nazi-appointed Bishop Theopil Wurm, he sought to preserve the independence of his faculty and seminary from Nazi and German Christian encroachment.

Fezer's talent for preaching was recognized early in his career. As chair of the seminary he was known as the "Man of the Word," and he was renowned outside of his seminary and across Württemberg for his lectures and seminars. His own homiletical theology was influenced by the theology of Adolf Schlatter. Because of his commitment to Nazism and membership in the German Christians movement, Fezer's work lost all credibility after the war.

== Published works ==
- Das Wort Gottes und die Predigt. Eine Weiterführung der prinzipiellen Homiletik auf Grund der Ergebnisse der neuen religionswissenschaftlichen und systematischen Forschung, Stuttgart 1925
- Der Herr und seine Gemeinde. Predigten, Stuttgart 1927
