= Hossenfelder =

Hossenfelder is a German surname.

Notable people with this surname include:

- Albert Hossenfelder (died 1947), first and only commander of German submarine U-342, who went down with the ship
- Erich Hossenfelder (1875–1935), German diplomat
- Joachim Hossenfelder (1899–1976), German theologian, Bishop of Brandenburg, prominent Nazi campaigner
- Malte Hossenfelder (1935–2011), German philosopher
- Sabine Hossenfelder (born 1976), German physicist
