= Kirchenkampf =

Situation of the Christian churches in Germany during the Nazi period

Kirchenkampf (German: [ˈkɪʁçn̩kampf], lit. 'church struggle') is a German term which pertains to the situation of the Christian churches in Germany during the Nazi period (1933–1945). Sometimes used ambiguously, the term may refer to one or more of the following different "church struggles":

1. The internal dispute within German Protestantism between the German Christians (Deutsche Christen) and the Confessing Church (Bekennende Kirche) over control of the Protestant churches;
2. The tensions between the Nazi regime and the Protestant church bodies; and
3. The tensions between the Nazi regime and the Catholic Church.

When Hitler obtained power in 1933, 95% of Germans were Christian, with 63% being Protestant and 32% being Catholic. Many historians maintain that Hitler's goal in the Kirchenkampf entailed not only ideological struggle, but ultimately the eradication of the churches. Other historians maintain no such plan existed.

Some leading Nazis such as Alfred Rosenberg and Martin Bormann were vehemently anti-Christian, and sought to de-Christianize Germany in the long term in favor of a racialized form of Germanic paganism. The Nazi Party saw the church struggle as an important ideological battleground. Hitler biographer Ian Kershaw wrote of the struggle in terms of an ongoing and escalating conflict between the Nazi state and the Christian churches. Historian Susannah Heschel wrote that the Kirchenkampf refers only to an internal dispute between members of the Confessing Church and members of the (Nazi-backed) "German Christians" over control of the Protestant church. Pierre Aycoberry wrote that for Catholics the phrase Kirchenkampf was reminiscent of the Kulturkampf of Otto von Bismarck's time – a campaign which had sought to reduce the influence of the Catholic Church in majority Protestant Germany.

== Background ==
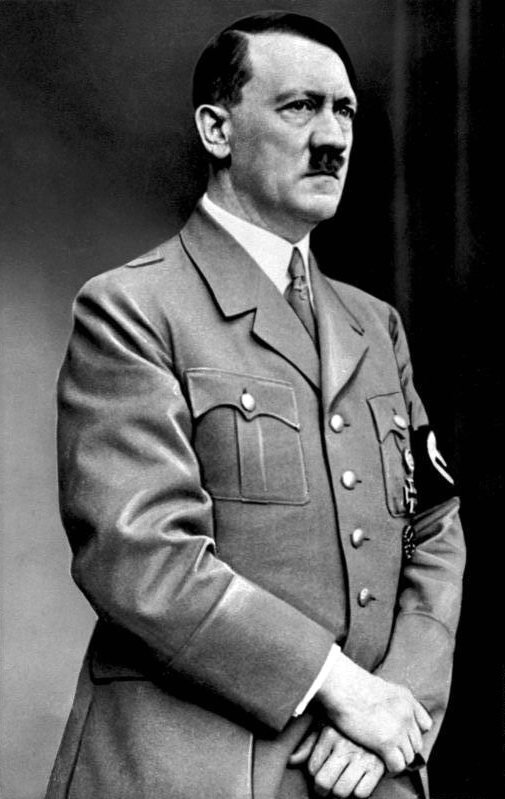
The Nazi dictator Adolf Hitler ruled Germany for the period of the Church Struggle.

Nazism wanted to transform the subjective consciousness of the German people – their attitudes, values, and mentalities – into a single-minded, obedient Volksgemeinschaft or "National People's Community". According to Ian Kershaw, in order to achieve this, the Nazis believed they would have to replace class, religious and regional allegiances by a "massively enhanced national self-awareness to mobilize the German people psychologically for the coming struggle and to boost their morale during the inevitable war". According to Anton Gill, the Nazis disliked universities, intellectuals and the Catholic and Protestant churches, their long term plan being to "de-Christianise Germany after the final victory". The Nazis co-opted the term Gleichschaltung (coordination) to mean conformity and subservience to the Nazi Party line: "there was to be no law but Hitler, and ultimately no god but Hitler". Other authors, such as Richard Steigmann-Gall, argue that there were anti-Christian individuals in the Nazi Party but that they did not represent the movement's position.

Nazi ideology conflicted with traditional Christian beliefs in various respects – Nazis criticized Christian notions of "meekness and guilt" on the basis that they "repressed the violent instincts necessary to prevent inferior races from dominating Aryans". Aggressive anti-church radicals like Alfred Rosenberg and Martin Bormann saw the conflict with the churches as a priority concern, and anti-church and anti-clerical sentiments were strong among grassroots party activists. East Prussian Party Gauleiter Erich Koch on the other hand, said that Nazism "had to develop from a basic Prussian-Protestant attitude and from Luther's unfinished Reformation". Hitler himself disdained Christianity, as Alan Bullock noted:

In Hitler's eyes, Christianity was a religion fit only for slaves; he detested its ethics in particular. Its teaching, he declared, was a rebellion against the natural law of selection by struggle and the survival of the fittest.

Though he was born as a Catholic, Hitler came to reject the Judeo-Christian conception of God and religion. Though he retained some regard for the organizational power of Catholicism, he had nothing but utter contempt for its teachings, which he said, if taken to their conclusion, "would mean the systematic cultivation of the human failure". However, important German conservative elements, such as the officer corps, opposed Nazi attacks on the churches and, in office, Hitler restrained his own anticlerical instincts out of political considerations, as well as the anticlericalism of his underlinings.

Hitler biographer Ian Kershaw wrote that, while many ordinary people were apathetic, after years of warning from Catholic clergy, Germany's Catholic population greeted the Nazi takeover with uncertainty, while among German Protestants, there was more optimism that the Nazi takeover would bring about a strengthened Germany with an "inner, moral revitalisation". However, within a short period, the Nazi government's tensions with the Christian Churches was to become a source of dissatisfaction in more religious circles.

== Chronology of the Kirchenkampf in five stages ==
Lueker et al. divide the Kirchenkampf into five stages. (Note: The five stages and their dates are the work of Lueker et al. However, various editors have added various events that fit the chronology but were not necessarily explicitly included by Lueker et al.)

=== First (spring to autumn 1933) ===
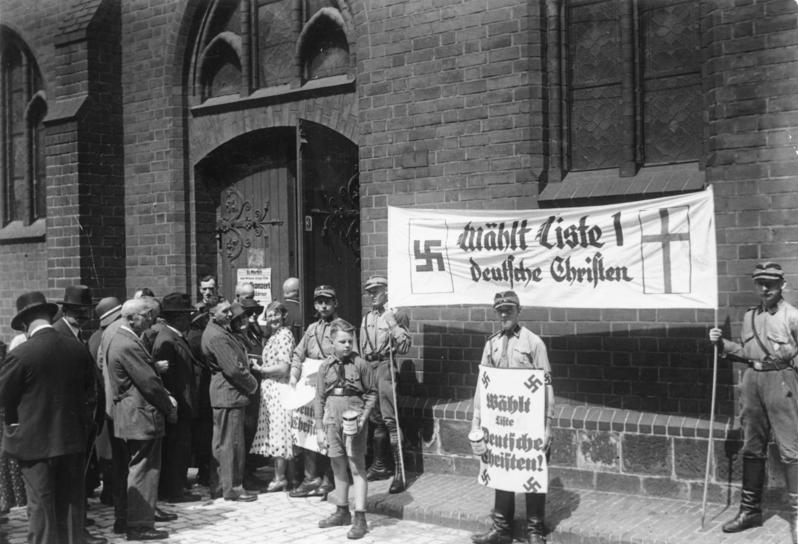
Stormtroopers holding Deutsche Christen propaganda during the Church Council elections on 23 July 1933 at St. Mary's Church, Berlin

- Hitler makes efforts to assimilate the churches into the culture of Nazism.
- Hitler moves to neutralize German Catholic political activity, resulting in the dissolution of the Centre Party and the signing of the Reichskonkordat.
- Preparation to create unified single Reichskirche from the 28 regional Protestant churches: Hitler installs pro-Nazi chaplain Ludwig Müller as Reich Bishop; splitting German Protestants.

=== Second (autumn 1933 to autumn 1934) ===
- Regime attempts to bring churches under control of the Nazi state (Gleichschaltung).
- Nazi breaches of Concordat commence immediately after signing: sterilization law promulgated, Catholic Youth Leagues dissolved; clergy, nuns and lay leaders harassed.
- Heretical views of Reich Bishop and German Christians, lead Martin Niemöller to found Pastors' Emergency League which grows into Confessing Church, from which some clergymen oppose the regime.
- The Barmen Declaration asserting—against the claims of the Reich—that Jesus Christ is the sole source of revelation and authority for the church is adopted in May.

=== Third (autumn 1934 to February 1937) ===
- Regime tries to bring the Protestant churches under its control by taking charge of church finances and governance structures.
- Failure of Müller to unite Protestants in Nazified Church sees Hitler appoint Hans Kerrl as Minister for Church Affairs.
- 1936, Nazis remove crucifixes in schools. Catholic Bishop of Münster, Clemens von Galen, protests and public demonstrations follow.
- 1936 – Confessing Church protest to Hitler against antisemitism, "anti-Christian" tendencies of regime, and interference in church affairs. Hundreds of pastors arrested, funds of the church confiscated, collections forbidden.

=== Fourth (February 1937 to 1939) ===
- Opposition to the church is no longer waged primarily by the Deutsche Christen but directly by Nazism itself through the party and state apparatus through increased imprisonment of resistant clergy.
- March 1937: Pope Pius XI issues Mit brennender Sorge encyclical, denouncing the Anti-Christian nature of Nazi ideology, protesting regime's violations of Concordat, racism and human rights abuses.
- Regime responds with intensification of Church Struggle. Heat was turned up on the "immorality trials" propaganda campaign. Christmas 1937 address, Pope tells cardinals "rarely has there been a persecution so grave."
- 1 July 1937, Martin Niemöller arrested. Martin Bormann unsuccessfully attempts to close the religious faculties but was successful in reducing the amount of religious instruction provided in public schools to two hours per week.
- 1937, Confessing Church proscribed.

=== Fifth stage (1939 to 1945) ===
- Bonhoeffer, a leading figure in the Confessing Church, is imprisoned (1943) and executed (1945).
- More clergy were imprisoned.
- Priest block was established at Dachau.
- In June 1941, Martin Bormann and Adolf Wagner order crucifixes to be removed from all classrooms in Bavaria. Mass protests mounted up in Munich condemning the move, and Hitler forced Bormann to rescind the order.
- July–August 1941 – Cardinal Clemens August Graf von Galen's sermons denounce lawlessness of Gestapo, confiscations of church properties, and Nazi euthanasia. Government takes program underground.
- Clergy were drafted into the military.
- Church publications were censored or banned.
- Services and functions restricted or banned.

== Nazi relationship with the Christian Churches ==
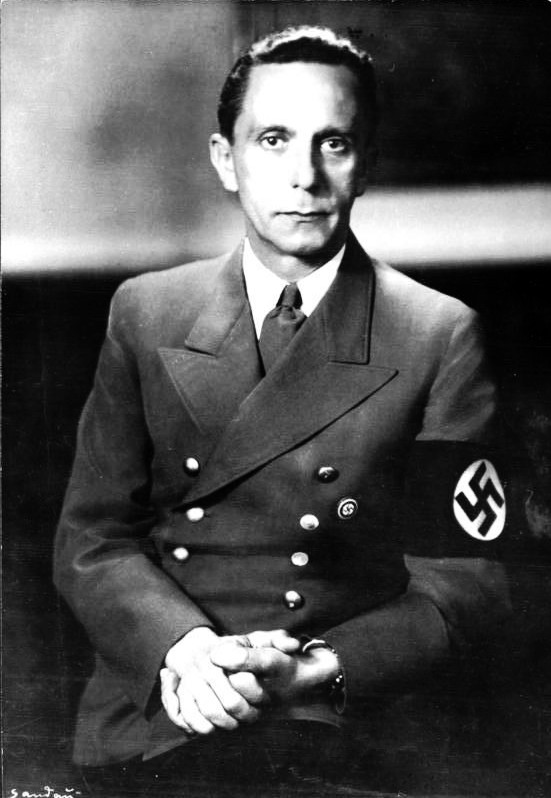
The Nazi propaganda minister, Joseph Goebbels, among the most aggressive anti-clerical Nazis, wrote that there was "an insoluble opposition between the Christian and a heroic-German world view".

Prior to the Reichstag vote for the Enabling Act of 1933 under which Hitler gained the "temporary" dictatorial powers with which he went on to permanently dismantle the Weimar Republic, Hitler promised the Reichstag on 23 March 1933, that he would not interfere with the rights of the churches. However, with power secured in Germany, Hitler quickly broke this promise. He divided the Lutheran Church (Germany's main Protestant denomination) and instigated a brutal persecution of the Jehovah's Witnesses. He dishonoured a Concordat signed with the Vatican and permitted attacks on Catholic organizations and education. A special Priests Barracks was established at Dachau Concentration Camp for clergy who had opposed the Hitler regime – its occupants were mainly Polish Catholic clergy.

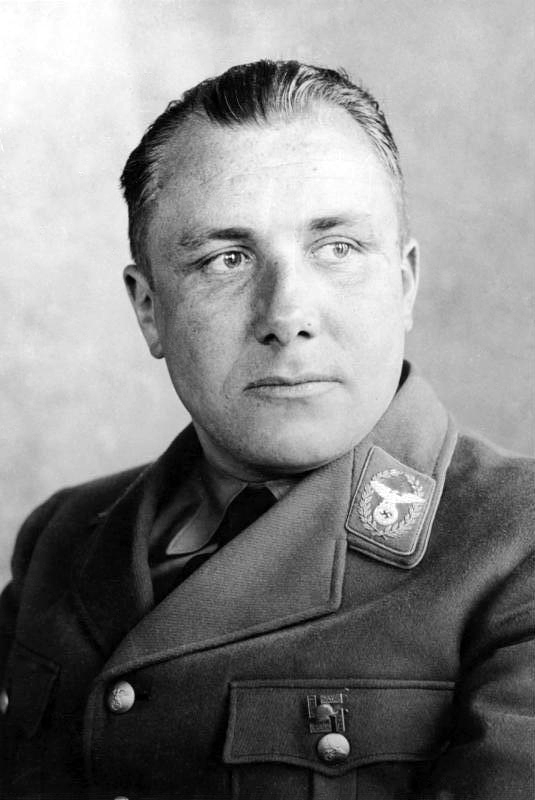
Martin Bormann, Deputy Nazi Party leader (after Hitler) from April 1941, was the most hardcore Anti-Christian radical in the NSDAP, and saw Nazism and Christianity as incompatible. He had a particular loathing for the Semitic origins of Christianity.

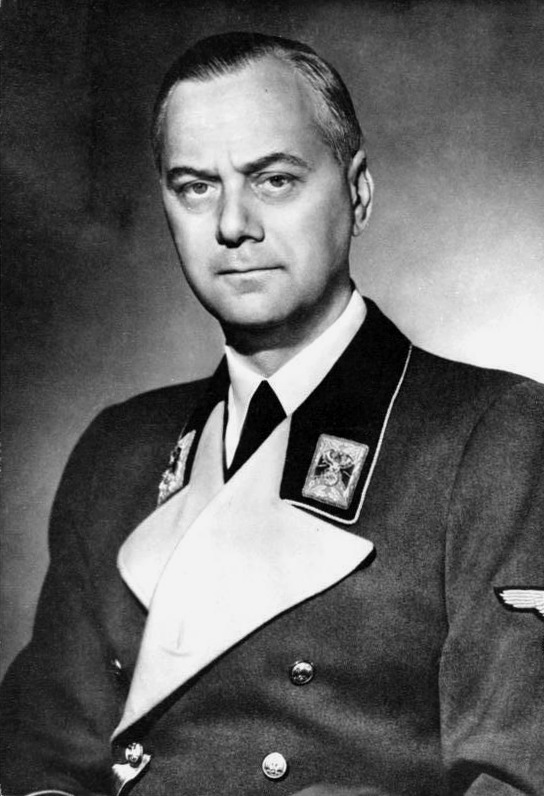
To Alfred Rosenberg, a neo-pagan, and the official Nazi philosopher, Catholicism was one of Nazism's chief enemies. He planned the "extermination of the foreign Christian faiths imported into Germany", and for the Bible and Christian cross to be replaced with Mein Kampf and the swastika.

Leading Nazis varied in the importance they attached to the Church Struggle. Kershaw wrote that, to the new Nazi government, Race policy and the 'Church Struggle' were among the most important ideological spheres: "In both areas, the party had no difficulty in mobilizing its activists, whose radicalism in turn forced the government into legislative action. In fact the party leadership often found itself compelled to respond to pressures from below, stirred up by the Gauleiter playing their own game, or emanating sometimes from radical activists at a local level". As time went on, anti-clericalism and anti-church sentiment among grass roots party activists "simply couldn't be eradicated" and they could "draw on the verbal violence of party leaders towards the churches for their encouragement.

Hitler himself possessed radical instincts in relation to the continuing conflict with the Catholic and Protestant churches in Germany. Though he occasionally spoke of wanting to delay the Church struggle and was prepared to restrain his anti-clericalism out of political considerations, his "own inflammatory comments gave his immediate underlings all the license they needed to turn up the heat in the 'Church Struggle, confident that they were 'working towards the Fuhrer'".

Bullock wrote that the churches and the army were the only two institutions to retain some independence in Nazi Germany and "among the most courageous demonstrations of opposition during the war were the sermons preached by the Catholic Bishop of Munster and the Protestant Pastor, Dr Niemoller..." but that "Neither the Catholic Church nor the Evangelical Church, however, as institutions, felt it possible to take up an attitude of open opposition to the regime". In the Nazi police state, the ability of the church and its members to oppose Nazi policy was severely restricted. In 1935, when Protestant pastors read a protest statement from the pulpits of Confessing churches, the Nazi authorities briefly arrested over 700 pastors and the Gestapo confiscated copies of Pius XI's 1937 anti-Nazi papal encyclical Mit brennender Sorge from diocesan offices throughout Germany. For refusing to declare loyalty to the Reich, or be conscripted into the army, Jehovah's Witnesses were declared "enemies", with 6000 of a total population of 30,000 sent to the concentration camps.

Alfred Rosenberg, an "outspoken pagan", held among offices the title of "the Fuehrer's Delegate for the Entire Intellectual and Philosophical Education and Instruction for the National Socialist Party". He also saw Nazism and Christianity as incompatible. In his Myth of the Twentieth Century (1930), Rosenberg wrote that the main enemies of the Germans were the "Russian Tartars" and "Semites" – with "Semites" including Christians, especially the Catholic Church.

Joseph Goebbels, the Nazi Minister for Propaganda, was among the more anti-clerical Nazi activists. Goebbels helped stage the "immorality trials" against the clergy in 1936 and 1937, as the war progressed, on the "Church Problem", he wrote "after the war it has to be generally solved... There is, namely, an insoluble opposition between the Christian and a heroic-German world view". Worried about the dissention caused by the Kirchenkampf, Hitler told Goebbels in the summer of 1935 he sought "peace with the Churches" – "at least for a period of time". As with the "Jewish problem", the radicals nonetheless pushed the church struggle forward, especially in Catholic areas, so that by the winter of 1935–1936 there was growing dissatisfaction with the Nazis in those areas. Kershaw noted that in early 1937, Hitler again told his inner circle that he "did not want a 'Church struggle" at this juncture", he expected "the great world struggle in a few years' time". Nevertheless, Hitler's impatience with the churches "prompted frequent outbursts of hostility. In early 1937 he was declaring that 'Christianity was ripe for destruction' (Untergang), and that the Churches must yield to the 'primacy of the state', railing against any compromise with 'the most horrible institution imaginable'."

Martin Bormann became Hitler's private secretary and de facto "deputy" Führer in April 1941. He was a leading advocate of the Kirchenkampf. Bormann was a rigid guardian of Nazi orthodoxy and saw Christianity and Nazism as "'incompatible,' primarily because the essential elements of Christianity were 'taken over from Judaism.'" He said publicly in 1941 that "National Socialism and Christianity are irreconcilable". Bormann's view of Christianity was epitomized in a confidential memo to Gauleiters in 1942; it reignited the fight against Christianity which had been in a détente, stating that the power of the churches "must absolutely and finally be broken" as Nazism "was completely incompatible with Christianity."

William Shirer wrote that the German people were not greatly aroused by the Nazi attacks on the churches. The great majority were not moved to face death or imprisonment for the sake of freedom of worship, being too impressed by Hitler's early foreign policy successes and the restoration of the German economy. Few paused to reflect "that under the leadership of Rosenberg, Bormann and Himmler, who were backed by Hitler, the Nazi regime intended to destroy Christianity in Germany, if it could, and substitute the old paganism of the early tribal Germanic gods and the new paganism of the Nazi extremists."

Because the Nazi Gleichschaltung policy of forced coordination encountered such forceful opposition from the churches, Hitler decided to postpone the struggle until after the war. During the war, Rosenberg, the party's official ideologist outlined the future envisioned for religion in Germany, with a thirty-point program for the future of the German churches. Among its articles: (1) the National Reich Church of Germany was to claim exclusive control over all churches in the Reich; (5) "the strange and foreign Christian faiths imported into Germany in the ill-omened year 800" were to be exterminated; (7) priests/pastors were to be replaced with National Reich Orators; (13) publication of the Bible was to cease; (14) Mein Kampf was to be considered the foremost source of ethics; (18) crucifixes, Bibles and saints to be removed from altars; (19) Mein Kampf was to be placed on altars "to the German nation and therefore to God the most sacred book"; (30) the Christian cross to be removed from all churches and replaced with the swastika. Albeit an investigation led by the Gestapo in 1941 in response to President Franklin D. Roosevelt's accusation of a Nazi conspiracy "to abolish all existing religions -- Catholic, Protestant, Mohammedan, Hindu, Buddhist, and Jewish alike" and impose a nazified international church established that the creator of the thirty-point program for the future of the German churches was Fritz Bildt, a fanatical Nazi and known troublemaker, rather than Alfred Rosenberg, who in 1937 tried to proclaim the program in the Garrison Church in Stettin shortly before the divine service began, he was forcibly removed from the pulpit and fined RMKS 500, having admitted to being the sole author and distributor of the program.

=== Catholic Church ===
A clearly threatening yet sporadic attacks on Catholic parties, organizations and press followed the Nazi seziure of power, which was done quickly to eliminate Political Catholicism. Two thousand functionaries of the Bavarian People's Party were rounded up by police in late June 1933, and it, along with the national Catholic Centre Party, ceased to exist in early July. Vice Chancellor Franz von Papen meanwhile negotiated the Reichskonkordat treaty with the Vatican, which prohibited clergy from participating in politics. Kershaw wrote that the Vatican was anxious to reach agreement with the new government, despite "continuing molestation of Catholic clergy, and other outrages committed by Nazi radicals against the Church and its organisations".

==== Concordat ====
The Concordat was signed at the Vatican on 20 July 1933, by Germany's Deputy Reich Chancellor Franz von Papen, and Cardinal Secretary of State Eugenio Pacelli (later Pope Pius XII). In his 1937 anti-Nazi encyclical, Pope Pius XI said that the Holy See had signed the Concordat "In spite of many serious misgivings" and in the hope it might "safeguard the liberty of the church in her mission of salvation in Germany". The treaty consisted of 34 articles and a supplementary protocol. Article 1 guaranteed "freedom of profession and public practice of the Catholic religion" and acknowledged the right of the church to regulate its own affairs. Within three months of the signing of the document, Cardinal Adolf Bertram, head of the German Catholic Bishops Conference, was writing in a pastoral letter of "grievous and gnawing anxiety" with regard to the government's actions towards Catholic organizations, charitable institutions, youth groups, press, Catholic Action and the mistreatment of Catholics for their political beliefs. According to Paul O'Shea, Hitler had a "blatant disregard" for the Concordat, and its signing was to him merely a first step in the "gradual suppression of the Catholic Church in Germany". Anton Gill wrote that "with his usual irresistible, bullying technique, Hitler then proceeded to take a mile where he had been given an inch" and closed all Catholic institutions whose functions weren't strictly religious:

It quickly became clear that [Hitler] intended to imprison the Catholics, as it were, in their own churches. They could celebrate mass and retain their rituals as much as they liked, but they could have nothing at all to do with German society otherwise. Catholic schools and newspapers were closed, and a propaganda campaign against the Catholics was launched.

The Concordat, wrote William Shirer, "was hardly put to paper before it was being broken by the Nazi Government". On 25 July, the Nazis promulgated their sterilization law, an offensive policy in the eyes of the Catholic Church. Five days later, moves began to dissolve the Catholic Youth League. Clergy, nuns and lay leaders began to be targeted, leading to thousands of arrests over the ensuing years, often on trumped up charges of currency smuggling or "immorality".

==== Ongoing "struggle" ====
In Hitler's bloody night of the long knives purge of 1934, Erich Klausener, the head of Catholic Action, was assassinated by the Gestapo. Catholic publications were shut down. The Gestapo began to violate the sanctity of the confessional.

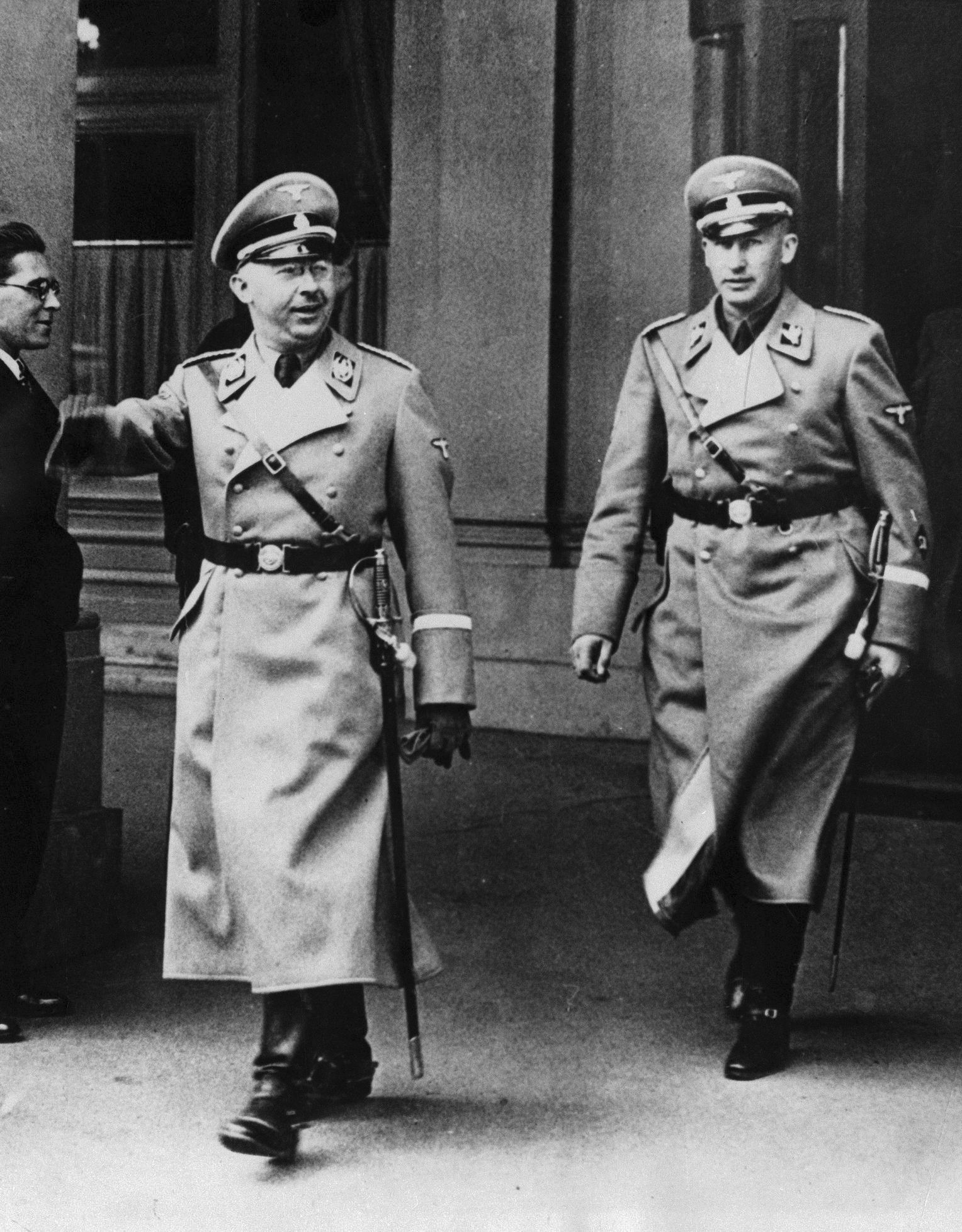
Heinrich Himmler (L) and Reinhard Heydrich (R) headed the Nazi security forces and wanted to de-Christianize Germany.

In January 1934, Hitler appointed Alfred Rosenberg as the cultural and educational leader of the Reich. Rosenberg was a neo-pagan and notoriously anti-Catholic. In his Myth of the Twentieth Century (1930), Rosenberg had described the Catholic Church as one of the main enemies of Nazism. The church responded on 16 February 1934 with the banning of Rosenberg's book. The Sanctum Officium recommended that Rosenberg's book be put on the Index Librorum Prohibitorum (forbidden books list of the Catholic Church) for scorning and rejecting "all dogmas of the Catholic Church, indeed the very fundamentals of the Christian religion". Clemens August Graf von Galen, the Bishop of Münster, derided the neo-pagan theories of Rosenberg as perhaps no more than "an occasion for laughter in the educated world", but warned that "his immense importance lies in the acceptance of his basic notions as the authentic philosophy of National Socialism and in his almost unlimited power in the field of German education. Herr Rosenberg must be taken seriously if the German situation is to be understood."

Under Nazi youth leader Baldur von Schirach, Catholic youth organizations were disbanded and Catholic children corralled into the Hitler Youth. Pope Pius XI issued a message to the youth of Germany on 2 April 1934, noting propaganda and pressure being exerted to point German youth "away from Christ and back to paganism". The Pope again condemned the new paganism to 5,000 German pilgrims in Rome in May and in other addresses later that year.

In January 1935, Nazi interior minister Wilhelm Frick urged "putting an end to Church influence over public life". In April, the daily publication of religious papers was banned and soon after, censorship of weekly periodicals was introduced. The American National Catholic Welfare Conference complained that anti-church songs were chanted by Hitler Youth and "anti-Christian slogans were chanted from trucks, which bore on their sides scurrilous cartoons of priests and nuns" while Catholic Youth organizations were "accused of the palpable absurdity of communist plotting". On 12 May, members of the Hitler Youth attacked Caspar Klein, the Archbishop of Paderborn.

Goering issued a decree against Political Catholicism in July. In August, Nazi stormtroopers held anti-clerical protests in Munich and Freiberg-im-Breisgau. Nazi propagandist Julius Streicher accused clergy and nuns of sexual perversion. The "morality trials" of Catholic clergy and nuns began in the summer of 1935 and the "threat of criminal prosecution on charges designed by the Propaganda Ministry as a goad to drive the clergy to accept the subversion of Christian teachings in the Reich". In the 1936 campaign against the monasteries and convents, the authorities charged 276 members of religious orders with the offence of "homosexuality".

Under Reinhard Heydrich and Heinrich Himmler, the Security Police, and the SD were responsible for suppressing internal and external enemies of the Nazi state. Among those enemies were "political churches" – such as Lutheran and Catholic clergy who opposed the Hitler regime. Such dissidents were arrested and sent to concentration camps. According to Himmler biographer Peter Longerich, Himmler was vehemently opposed to Christian sexual morality and the "principle of Christian mercy", both of which he saw as a dangerous obstacle to his planned battle with "subhumans". In 1937 he wrote:

We live in an era of the ultimate conflict with Christianity. It is part of the mission of the SS to give the German people in the next half century the non-Christian ideological foundations on which to lead and shape their lives. This task does not consist solely in overcoming an ideological opponent but must be accompanied at every step by a positive impetus: in this case that means the reconstruction of the German heritage in the widest and most comprehensive sense.

Himmler saw the main task of his Schutzstaffel (SS) organization to be that of "acting as the vanguard in overcoming Christianity and restoring a 'Germanic' way of living" in order to prepare for the coming conflict between "humans and subhumans": Longerich wrote that, while the Nazi movement as a whole launched itself against Jews and Communists, "by linking de-Christianization with re-Germanization, Himmler had provided the SS with a goal and purpose all of its own." He set about making his SS the focus of a "cult of the Teutons".

Goebbels noted the mood of Hitler in his diary on 25 October 1936: "Trials against the Catholic Church temporarily stopped. Possibly wants peace, at least temporarily. Now a battle with Bolshevism. Wants to speak with Faulhaber". On 4 November 1936, Hitler met Faulhaber. Hitler spoke for the first hour, then Faulhaber told him that the Nazi government had been waging war on the church for three years – 600 religious teachers had lost their jobs in Bavaria alone – and the number was set to rise to 1700 and the government had instituted laws the church could not accept – like the sterilization of criminals and the handicapped. While the Catholic Church respected the notion of authority, nevertheless, "when your officials or your laws offend Church dogma or the laws of morality, and in so doing offend our conscience, then we must be able to articulate this as responsible defenders of moral laws". Hitler told Faulhaber that the radical Nazis could not be contained until there was peace with the church and that either the Nazis and the church would fight Bolshevism together, or there would be war against the church. Kershaw cites the meeting as an example of Hitler's ability to "pull the wool over the eyes even of hardened critics" for "Faulhaber – a man of sharp acumen, who had often courageously criticized the Nazi attacks on the Catholic Church – went away convinced that Hitler was deeply religious".

==== Mit brennender Sorge ====
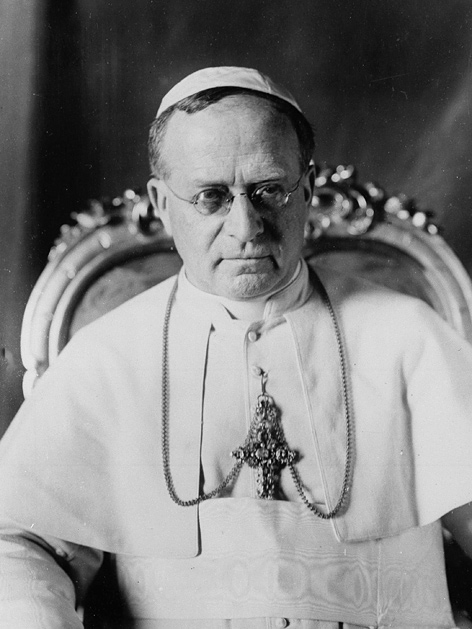
Pope Pius XI issued the Mit brennender Sorge anti-Nazi encyclical in 1937.

By early 1937, the church hierarchy in Germany, which had initially attempted to co-operate with the new government, had become highly disillusioned. In March, Pope Pius XI issued the Mit brennender Sorge (German: "With burning concern") encyclical. The Pope asserted the inviolability of human rights and expressed deep concern at the Nazi regime's flouting of the 1933 Concordat, the Anti-Christian nature of its ideology and its attacks on Christian values. It accused the government of sowing the "tares of suspicion, discord, hatred, calumny, of secret and open fundamental hostility to Christ and His Church" and Pius noted on the horizon the "threatening storm clouds" of religious wars of extermination over Germany.

The Vatican had the text smuggled into Germany and printed and distributed in secret. Written in German, not the usual Latin, it was read from the pulpits of all German Catholic churches on one of the church's busiest Sundays, Palm Sunday. According to Gill, "Hitler was beside himself with rage. Twelve presses were seized, and hundreds of people sent either to prison or the camps." This despite Article 4 of the Concordat giving a guarantee of freedom of correspondence between the Vatican and the German clergy.

The Nazis responded with, an intensification of the Church Struggle, beginning around April. Goebbels noted heightened verbal attacks on the clergy from Hitler in his diary and wrote that Hitler had approved the start of trumped up "immorality trials" against clergy and anti-church propaganda campaign. Goebbels' orchestrated attack included a staged "morality trial" of 37 Franciscans.

In his Christmas Eve 1937 address, Pope Pius XI told the College of Cardinals, that despite what "some people" had been saying, "In Germany, in fact, there is religious persecution ... indeed rarely has there been a persecution so grave, so terrible, so painful, so sad in its deep effects ... Our protest therefore could not be more explicit or more resolute before the whole world".

==== Prelude to World War II ====
In March 1938, Nazi Minister of State Adolf Wagner spoke of the need to continue the fight against Political Catholicism and Alfred Rosenberg said that the churches of Germany "as they exist at present, must vanish from the life of our people". In the space of a few months, Bishop Johannes Baptista Sproll of Rothenberg, Cardinal Michael von Faulhaber of Munich, and Cardinal Theodor Innitzer of Vienna were physically attacked by Nazis.

After initially offering support to the Anschluss, Austria's Innitzer became a critic of the Nazis. With power secured in Austria, a Nazi mob ransacked his residence, after he had denounced Nazi antisemitism and violence. L'Osservatore Romano reported on 15 October that Hitler Youth and the SA had gathered at Innitzer's cathedral during a service Catholic Youth and started "counter-shouts and whistlings: 'Down with Innitzer! Our faith is Germany'". The mob later gathered at the cardinal's residence and the following day stoned the building, broke in and ransacked it – bashing a secretary unconscious, and storming another house of the cathedral curia and throwing its curate out the window. The American National Catholic Welfare Conference wrote that Pope Pius, "again protested against the violence of the Nazis, in language recalling Nero and Judas the Betrayer, comparing Hitler with Julian the Apostate."

On 10 February 1939, Pope Pius XI died. Eugenio Pacelli was elected his successor three weeks later and became Pius XII. Europe was on the brink of World War II.

==== World War II ====
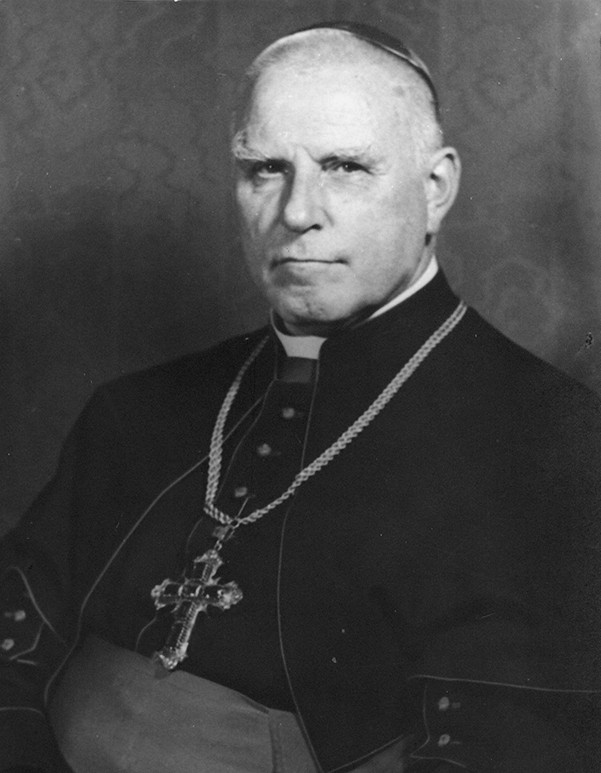
Bishop Clemens August Graf von Galen, the "Lion of Münster", a vehement critic of Nazi Germany

Summi Pontificatus ("On the Limitations of the Authority of the State"), issued 20 October 1939, was the first papal encyclical issued by Pope Pius XII, and established some of the themes of his papacy. During the drafting of the letter, the Second World War commenced with the Nazi/Soviet invasion of Catholic Poland. Couched in diplomatic language, Pius endorses Catholic resistance, and states his disapproval of the war, racism, anti-semitism, the Nazi/Soviet invasion of Poland and the brutal attacks on the churches.

In March 1941, Vatican Radio decried the wartime position of the Catholic Church in Germany: "The religious situation in Germany is pathetic. All young men that feel their vocation is to take Holy Orders must forego this desire. The number of monasteries and convents which have been dissolved has become even larger. The development and maintenance of the Christian life has been rendered difficult. All that remains of the once great Catholic press in Germany are a few Parish magazines. The threat of a national religion is looming increasingly over all religious life. This national religion is based solely on the Fuhrer's will".

On 26 July 1941, Bishop August Graf von Galen wrote to the government to complain "The Secret Police has continued to rob the property of highly respected German men and women merely because they belonged to Catholic orders". Often Galen directly protested to Hitler over violations of the Concordat. When in 1936, Nazis removed crucifixes in school, protest by Galen led to public demonstration. Like Konrad von Preysing, he assisted with the drafting of the 1937 papal encyclical. His three powerful sermons of July and August 1941 earned him the nickname of the "Lion of Munster". The sermons were printed and distributed illegally. He denounced the lawlessness of the Gestapo, the confiscations of church properties and the cruel program of Nazi euthanasia. He attacked the Gestapo for seizing church properties and converting them to their own purposes – including use as cinemas and brothels.

On 26 June 1941, the German bishops drafted a pastoral letter from their Fulda Conference, to be read from all pulpits on 6 July: "Again and again have the bishops brought their justified claims and complaints before the proper authorities... Through this pastoral declaration the Bishops want you to see the real situation of the church". The bishops wrote that the church faced "restrictions and limitations put on the teaching of their religion and on church life" and of great obstacles in the fields of Catholic education, freedom of service and religious festivals, the practice of charity by religious orders and the role of preaching morals. Catholic presses had been silenced and kindergartens closed and religious instruction in schools nearly stamped out:

Dear Members of the diosceses: We Bishops... feel an ever great sorrow about the existence of powers working to dissolve the blessed union between Christ and the German people... the existence of Christianity in Germany is at stake.

==== Letter of the bishops ====
The following year, on 22 March 1942, the German bishops issued a pastoral letter on "The Struggle against Christianity and the Church": The letter launched a defence of human rights and the rule of law and accused the Reich Government of "unjust oppression and hated struggle against Christianity and the Church", despite the loyalty of German Catholics to the Fatherland, and brave service of Catholics soldiers. It accused the regime of seeking to rid Germany of Christianity:

For years a war has raged in our Fatherland against Christianity and the Church, and has never been conducted with such bitterness. Repeatedly the German bishops have asked the Reich Government to discontinue this fatal struggle; but unfortunately our appeals and our endeavours were without success.

The letter outlined serial breaches of the 1933 Concordat, reiterated complaints of the suffocation of Catholic schooling, presses and hospitals and said that the "Catholic faith has been restricted to such a degree that it has disappeared almost entirely from public life" and even worship within churches in Germany "is frequently restricted or oppressed", while in the conquered territories (and even in the Old Reich), churches had been "closed by force and even used for profane purposes". The freedom of speech of clergymen had been suppressed and priests were being "watched constantly" and punished for fulfilling "priestly duties" and incarcerated in Concentration camps without legal process. Religious orders had been expelled from schools, and their properties seized, while seminaries had been confiscated "to deprive the Catholic priesthood of successors".

The bishops denounced the Nazi euthanasia program and declared their support for human rights and personal freedom under God and "just laws" of all people:

We demand juridical proof of all sentences and release of all fellow citizens who have been deprived of their liberty without proof ... We the German bishops shall not cease to protest against the killing of innocent persons. Nobody's life is safe unless the Commandment, "Thous shalt not kill" is observed ... We the bishops, in the name of the Catholic people ... demand the return of all unlawfully confiscated and in some cases sequestered property ... for what happens today to church property may tomorrow happen to any lawful property.

=== Protestant churches ===
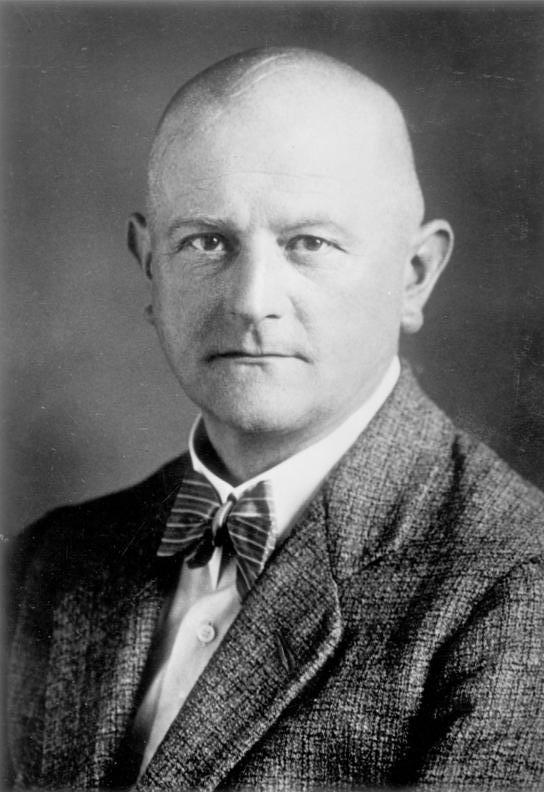
Ludwig Müller, Hitler's choice for Reich Bishop of the German Evangelical Church, which sought to subordinate German Protestantism to the Nazi government

Kershaw wrote that the subjugation of the Protestant churches proved more difficult than Hitler had envisaged. With 28 separate regional churches, his bid to create a unified Reich Church through Gleichschaltung ultimately failed, and Hitler became uninterested in supporting the so-called "German Christians" Nazi-aligned movement. Historian Susannah Heschel wrote that the Kirchenkampf is "sometimes mistakenly understood as referring to the Protestant churches' resistance to National Socialism, but the term in fact refers to the internal dispute between members of the Bekennende Kirche Confessing Church and members of the [Nazi-backed] Deutsche Christen German Christians for control of the Protestant church."

In 1933, the "German Christians" wanted Nazi doctrines on race and leadership to be applied to a Reich Church but had only around 3,000 of Germany's 17,000 pastors. In July, church leaders submitted a constitution for a Reich Church, which the Reichstag approved. The Church Federation proposed the well-qualified Pastor Friedrich von Bodelschwingh to be the new Reich Bishop, but Hitler endorsed his friend Ludwig Müller, a Nazi and former naval chaplain, to serve as Reich Bishop. The Nazis terrorized supporters of Bodelschwingh, and dissolved various church organizations, ensuring the election of Müller as Reich Bishop. But Müller's heretical views against Paul the Apostle and the Semitic origins of Christ and the Bible quickly alienated sections of the Protestant church. Pastor Martin Niemöller responded with the Pastors Emergency League which re-affirmed the Bible. The movement grew into the Confessing Church, from which some clergymen opposed the Nazi regime.

By 1934, the Confessing Church had declared itself the legitimate Protestant Church of Germany. Despite his closeness to Hitler, Müller had failed to unite Protestantism behind the Nazi Party. In response to the regime's attempt to establish a state church, in March 1935, the Confessing Church Synod announced:

We see our nation threatened with mortal danger; the danger lies in a new religion. The Church has been ordered by its Master to see that Christ is honoured by our nation in a manner befitting the Judge of the world. The Church knows that it will be called to account if the German nation turns its back on Christ without being forewarned".

The Nazis response to this synod announcement was to arrest 700 Confessing pastors. Müller resigned. To instigate a new effort at coordinating the Protestant churches, Hitler appointed another friend, Hans Kerrl to the position of Minister for Church Affairs. A relative moderate, Kerrl initially had some success in this regard, but amid continuing protests by the Confessing Church against Nazi policies, he accused churchmen of failing to appreciate the Nazi doctrine of "Race, blood and soil" and gave the following explanation of the Nazi conception of "Positive Christianity", telling a group of submissive clergy:

The Party stands on the basis of Positive Christianity, and positive Christianity is National Socialism... National Socialism is the doing of God's will ... God's will reveals itself in German blood ... Dr Zoellner and [Catholic Bishop of Münster] Count Galen have tried to make clear to me that Christianity consists in faith in Christ as the son of God. That makes me laugh ... No, Christianity is not dependent upon the Apostle's Creed ... True Christianity is represented by the party, and the German people are now called by the party and especially the Fuehrer to a real Christianity ... the Fuehrer is the herald of a new revelation".

At the end of 1935, the Nazis arrested 700 Confessing Church pastors. When in May 1936, the Confessing Church sent Hitler a memorandum courteously objecting to the "anti-Christian" tendencies of his regime, condemning anti-Semitism and asking for an end to interference in church affairs. Paul Berben wrote, "A Church envoy was sent to Hitler to protest against the persecutions, the concentration camps, and the activities of the Gestapo, and to demand freedom of speech, particularly in the press." The Nazi Minister of the Interior, Wilhelm Frick responded harshly. Hundreds of pastors were arrested, Dr Weissler, a signatory to the memorandum, was killed at Sachsenhausen concentration camp and the funds of the church were confiscated and collections forbidden. Church resistance stiffened and by early 1937, Hitler had abandoned his hope of uniting the Protestant churches.

On July 1, 1937, Niemöller was arrested by the Gestapo and later sent to the concentration camps. He remained mainly at Dachau until the fall of the regime. Theological universities were closed, and other pastors and theologians arrested.

Dietrich Bonhoeffer, another leading spokesman for the Confessing Church, was from the outset a critic of the Hitler regime's racism and became active in the German resistance – calling for Christians to speak out against Nazi atrocities. Arrested in 1943, he was implicated in the 1944 July Plot to assassinate Hitler and executed.

Another critic of the Nazi regime was Eberhard Arnold, a theologian who founded the Bruderhof. The Bruderhof refused to pledge allegiance to the Fuhrer, and refused to join the army. The community was raided and placed under surveillance in 1933, and then raided again in 1937 and shut down. Members were given 24 hours to leave the country.

The Nazi policy of interference in Protestantism did not achieve its aims. A majority of German Protestants sided neither with Deutsche Christen, nor with the Confessing Church. Both groups also faced significant internal disagreements and division. Mary Fulbrook wrote in her history of Germany:

The Nazis eventually gave up their attempt to co-opt Christianity, and made little pretence at concealing their contempt for Christian beliefs, ethics and morality. Unable to comprehend that some Germans genuinely wanted to combine commitment to Christianity and Nazism, some members of the SS even came to view German Christians as almost more of a threat than the Confessing Church.

== Long-term plans ==
Some historians maintain that Hitler's goal in the Kirchenkampf entailed not only ideological struggle, but ultimately the eradication of the church. Other historians maintain no such plan existed.

Alan Bullock wrote that "once the war was over, [Hitler] promised himself, he would root out and destroy the influence of the Christian churches, but until then he would be circumspect". According to the Encyclopædia Britannica, Hitler believed Christianity and Nazism were "incompatible" and intended to replace Christianity with a "racist form of warrior paganism".

== See also ==
- Away from Rome!
- Catholic Church and Nazi Germany
- Catholic resistance to Nazi Germany
- Christmas in Nazi Germany
- Gottgläubig
- Mit brennender Sorge
- The Ninth Day
- Persecution of Jehovah's Witnesses in Nazi Germany
- Prussian Union of Churches § Under Nazi rule
- Religion in Nazi Germany
- Religious aspects of Nazism
- White Rose
