= Pfarrernotbund =

Group of German protestant christian pastors

The Pfarrernotbund (English: Emergency Covenant of Pastors) was an organisation founded on 21 September 1933 to unite German evangelical theologians, pastors and church office-holders against the introduction of the Aryan paragraph into the 28 Protestant regional church bodies and the Deutsche Evangelische Kirche (DEK) and against the efforts by Reich-bishop Ludwig Müller and the German Christians (DC) since April 1933 to merge the German Protestant churches into one Reich Church that would be Nazi in ideology and entirely lacking any Jewish or Christian origins. As a Christian resistance to National Socialism it was the forerunner of the Confessing Church, founded the following year.

== Prelude ==
Hitler discretionarily ordered unconstitutional and premature re-elections of all presbyters and synod deputies in all the Protestant regional church bodies in Germany for July 23, 1933. In these elections the Nazi Kirchenpartei called Faith Movement of the German Christians gained an average of 70-80% of all seats in the presbyteries and synods. Only in a minority of congregations the German Christians gained no majority. Only in 4 regional synods other Kirchenparteien held the majority of the seats, those were the synods of the Evangelical Lutheran Church in Bavaria, the Evangelical Lutheran State Church of Hanover, and the Evangelical-Lutheran Church in Württemberg, and the provincial synod of the ecclesiastical province of Westphalia, a regional substructure within the Evangelical Church of the old-Prussian Union, which itself had a German Christian majority in its general synod. In 1934 the new Nazi-submissive general leadership of the old-Prussian Church suspended the Westphalian provincial synod. The opposition among Protestant parishioners and pastors thus regarded only the former three church bodies as uncorrupted intact churches, as opposed to the other then so-called destroyed churches.

On September 5 and 6 the same year the General Synod of the Evangelical Church of the old-Prussian Union convened. The German Christians used their new majority, as they had done earlier in many provincial synods to the effect to adopt the so-called Aryan paragraph (German: Arierparagraph) as church law, thus demanding that employees of the Evangelical Church of the old-Prussian Union – being all baptised Protestant church members – who had grandparents, who were enrolled as Jews, or who were married with such persons, were all to be dismissed.

On 7 April 1933 the Nazi Reich's government had introduced an equivalent law for all state officials and employees. By introducing the Nazi racist attitudes into the Evangelical Church of the old-Prussian Union, the approving synodals betrayed the Christian sacrament of baptism, according to which this act makes a person a Christian, superseding any other faith, which oneself may have been observing before and knowing nothing about any racial affinity as a prerequisite of being a Christian, let alone one's grandparents' religious affiliation being an obstacle to being a Christian.

When on September 5 Karl Koch, then praeses of the Westphalian provincial synod, tried to bring forward the arguments of the opposition against the Aryan paragraph and the abolition of synodal and presbyterial democracy, the majority of German Christian general synodals shouted him down. The German Christians abused the general synod as a mere acclamation, like a Nazi party convention. Koch and his partisans left the synod. The majority of German Christians thus voted in the Aryan paragraph for all the Evangelical Church of the old-Prussian Union. On September 5 the general synodals passed the retroactive church law, which only established the function and title of bishop, already prior used by Reich's Bishop Ludwig Müller, calling himself also state bishop (German: Landesbischof) of the old-Prussian Church. The same law renamed the ecclesiastical provinces into bishoprics (German: Bistum/Bistümer, sg./pl.), each led – according to the new law of September 6 – by a provincial bishop (German: Provinzialbischof) replacing the prior general superintendents.

Rudolf Bultmann and Hans von Soden, professors of Protestant theology at the Philip's University in Marburg upon Lahn, wrote in their assessment in 1933, that the Aryan paragraph contradicts the Protestant confession of everybody's right to perform her or his faith freely. "The Gospel is to be universally preached to all peoples and races and makes all baptised persons insegregable brethren to each other. Therefore unequal rights, due to national or racial arguments, are inacceptable as well as any segregation."

By enabling the dismissal of all Protestants of Jewish descent from jobs with the Evangelical Church of the old-Prussian Union and other regional church bodies, the official church bodies accepted the Nazi racist doctrine of anti-Semitism. This breach with Christian principles within the range of the church was unacceptable to many church members. Nevertheless, pursuing Martin Luther's doctrine of the Doctrine of the Two Regiments (in German) (God rules within the world: Directly within the church and in the state by means of the secular government) many church members could not see any basis, how a Protestant church body could interfere with the anti-Semitism performed in the state sphere, since in its self-conception the church body was a religious, not a political organisation.

Only few parishioners and clergy, mostly of Reformed tradition, followed John Calvin's doctrine of the Kingdom of Christ within the church and the world. Among them were Karl Barth and Dietrich Bonhoeffer, who demanded the church bodies to oppose the abolition of democracy and the unlawfulness in the general political sphere.

Especially pastors in the countryside were outraged about this development. Herbert Goltzen, Eugen Weschke, and Günter Jacob, three pastors from Lower Lusatia, regarded the introduction of the Aryan paragraph as the violation of the confession. In late summer 1933 Jacob, pastor in Noßdorf (a part of today's Forst in Lusatia), developed the central theses, which became the self-commitment of the opponents.

== Gathering the opposition in the Emergency Covenant of Pastors ==
On September 11, 1933, Gerhard Jacobi, pastor of William I Memorial Church, Berlin, gathered ca. 60 opposing pastors, who clearly saw the breach of Christian and Protestant principles. Weschke and Günter Jacob proposed to found the Pfarrernotbund, and so they did, electing Pastor Martin Niemöller their president. On the basis of the theses of Günter Jacob its members concluded that a schism was a matter of fact, a new Protestant church was to be established, since the official destroyed churches were anti-Christian, heretical and therefore illegitimate. Each pastor joining the Covenant – until the end of September 1933 2,036 out of a total of 18,842 Protestant pastors in Germany acceded – had to sign that he rejected the Aryan paragraph.

In 1934 the Covenant counted 7,036 members, after 1935 the number sank to 4,952, among them 374 retired pastors, 529 auxiliary preachers and 116 candidates of ministry.
