= Emanuel Hirsch =

German theologian (1888–1972)

Emanuel Hirsch (14 June 1888 in Bentwisch, Province of Brandenburg – 17 July 1972 in Göttingen) was a German Protestant theologian and also a member of the Nazi Party and a number of Nazi-supporting organizations. He escaped denazification at the end of the war by quitting his professorship, allegedly for health reasons, losing the pension from his University.

Hirsch studied at the Humboldt University of Berlin where his teachers were Karl Holl and Adolf von Harnack. He earned his PhD with the thesis Fichte's Philosophy of Religion in the context of his overall philosophical development (in German: Fichtes Religionsphilosophie im Rahmen der philosophischen Gesamtentwicklung Fichtes). Hirsch was a member of the Wingolf student fraternity.

He was a professor at Göttingen University (1921–1945). Shortly after the Nazi seizure of power he wrote:

No other people of the world has a statesman who is so serious about Christendom; when Adolf Hitler concluded his great speech on May 1st with a prayer everybody could feel the wonderful candor therein.

In 1933 Hirsch signed the Vow of allegiance of the Professors of the German Universities and High-Schools to Adolf Hitler and the National Socialistic State.

Emanuel Hirsch joined the NSDAP in 1937 and also became a Patron Member of the SS and joined the National Socialist People's Welfare. Hirsch was a leader of the German Christians and an advisor of Reich Bishop Ludwig Müller.

== Literary works ==
- An editor of the "Theologische Literaturzeitung" (i.e. Theological Literary Magazine; with Adolf von Harnack, Emil Schürer)
- Luthers Gottesanschauung, 1918
- Jesus Christus, der Herr, 1926
- Die idealistische Philosophie und das Christentum. Gesammelte Aufsätze., 1926 (i.e. Idealism and Christianity. Collected Essays)
- Kierkegaardstudien, 1933
- Die gegenwärtige geistige Lage im Spiegel philosophischer und theologischer Besinnung. Akademische Vorlesungen zum Verständnis des deutschen Jahres 1933, 1934 (i.e. The contemporary spiritual situation in the mirror of philosophical and theological consciousness. Academic lectures for the understanding of the German Year 1933.)
- Hilfsbuch zum Studium der Dogmatik, 1937 (Manual for Studying Dogmatics), 4th ed. 2002, ISBN 3-11-001242-1
- Leitfaden zur christlichen Lehre, 1938 (i.e. Compendium for the Christian Doctrine)
- Die Auferstehungsgeschichten und der christliche Glaube, 1940 (i.e. Resurrection Narratives and the Christian Faith)
- Frühgeschichte des Evangelismus, 1941
