= German Protestant Church Confederation =

Formal federation of 28 regional Protestant churches in the Weimar Republic

The German Protestant Church Confederation (German: Deutscher Evangelischer Kirchenbund, abbreviated DEK) was a formal federation of 28 regional Protestant churches (Landeskirchen) of Lutheran, Reformed or United Protestant administration or confession. It existed during the Weimar Republic from 1922 until replaced by the German Evangelical Church in 1933. It was a predecessor body to the Protestant Church in Germany.

== History ==
Besides the smaller Protestant denominations of the Mennonites, Baptists and Methodists, which were organised crossing state borders along denominational lines, there were 29 (later 28) church bodies organised according to the territorial borders of the German states or the Prussian provinces. Those Protestant church bodies, covering the territory of former monarchies with a ruling Protestant dynasty, had been state churches until 1918, with the exception of the Protestant church bodies in territories annexed by Prussia in 1866. Others had been no less territorially defined Protestant minority church bodies within Catholic monarchies, where before 1918 the Roman Catholic Church played the role of state church. Starting in 1852 the German Evangelical Church Conference (a.k.a. Eisenach Conference. Deutsche Evangelische Kirchenkonferenz, or Eisenacher Konferenz) became a steady coordinating organisation, which more and more state churches joined. Its executive body was the German Evangelical Church Committee (Deutscher Evangelischer Kirchenausschuss; DEKA).

Under the Weimar Constitution, there would be no state churches any longer, but the churches remained public corporations and retained their subsidies from government. The theological faculties in the universities continued, as did religious instruction in the schools, however, allowing parents to opt out for their children. The rights formerly held by the monarchs in the German Empire simply devolved to church councils instead, and the high-ranking church administrators —who had been civil servants in the Empire —simply became church officials instead. Chairpersons elected by synods were introduced into the governing structures of the churches.

After the system of state churches had ended with the abolition of the monarchies in the German states, the merger of the Protestant church bodies within Germany became a viable option. A merger of the Protestant regional churches was permanently under discussion, but never materialised due to strong regional self-confidence and traditions as well as the denominational fragmentation into Lutheran, Calvinist and united churches. The German Evangelical Church Confederation was prepared for with conferences in Cassel in 1919, in Dresden 1919 and Stuttgart in 1921. The then 29 territorially defined German Protestant church bodies formed Deutscher Evangelischer Kirchenbund following the model of Schweizerischer Evangelischer Kirchenbund established by the Swiss Landeskirchen in 1920. The German Evangelical Church Conference was then dissolved. Save for the organisational matters under the jurisdiction of the Confederation, the regional churches remained independent in all other matters, including especially theology, since they comprised churches of different confessional compositions. This federal system allowed for a great deal of regional autonomy in the governance of German Protestantism, as it allowed for a confederated church parliament that served as a forum for discussion and that endeavoured to resolve theological and organisational conflicts.

The Confederation was reorganised when Adolf Hitler came to power in 1933, in order to become the core of a future united Protestant church in Germany. However, when Nazi-submissive proponents of the German Christians usurped that project, the new united German Evangelical Church turned out to be a heretical, rather un-Protestant top-down hierarchical institution. Lacking any synodal and presbyterial democracy and with the new church's attitude to reserve baptism and thus church membership to so-called Aryans only, the German Christians betrayed the universality of the baptism, which is why many former supporters of a united Protestant church then refused their collaboration (see Confessing Church). After the end of the Nazi reign the surviving regional Protestant church bodies in Germany founded a new umbrella in August 1945, the Evangelical Church in Germany (EKD).

== Governance ==
The Confederation was governed and administered by a 36-member Executive Committee (Kirchenausschuss), which was responsible for ongoing governance between the annual conventions of the Church General Assembly (Kirchentag). This assembly was composed of elected representatives of the various regional churches.

== Member churches ==
The following independent regional Protestant church bodies were members in the German Evangelical Church Confederation:

- Protestant Church of Anhalt (German: Evangelische Landeskirche Anhalts), a church body united by confession with 315,000 parishioners in 1922
- United Evangelical Protestant State Church of Baden (German: Vereinigte Evangelisch-protestantische Landeskirche Badens), united by confession with 821,000 parishioners in 1922
- Evangelical Lutheran Church in Bavaria right of the river Rhine (German: Evangelisch-lutherische Kirche in Bayern rechts des Rheins), Lutheran with 1,575,000 parishioners in 1925
- Evangelical Church of the Region of Birkenfeld (German:Evangelische Kirche des Landesteils Birkenfeld, united by confession with 40,000 parishioners in 1922
- Evangelical Church of Bremen (German: Bremische Evangelische Kirche), a church body united in administration comprising mostly Reformed, some Lutheran and few united congregations with by 260,000 parishioners in 1922
- Evangelical Lutheran Church in Brunswick (German: Braunschweigische evangelisch-lutherische Landeskirche), Lutheran with 464,000 parishioners in 1922
- Evangelical State Church of Frankfurt upon Main (German:Evangelische Landeskirche Frankfurt am Main), a church body united in administration comprising Lutheran, some United and few Reformed congregations with by 220,000 parishioners in 1922
- Evangelical Lutheran Church in the Hamburgian State (German:Evangelisch-Lutherische Kirche im Hamburgischen Staate), a Lutheran church body with 914,000 parishioners in 1922
- Evangelical Lutheran State Church of Hanover (German: Evangelisch-lutherische Landeskirche Hannovers), Lutheran with 2,414,000 parishioners in 1922
- Evangelical Reformed State Church of the Province of Hanover (German:Evangelisch-reformierte Landeskirche der Provinz Hannover), Reformed with 157,000 parishioners in 1922
- Evangelical Church in Hesse (Cassel, within Prussia; German:Evangelische Landeskirche in Hessen-Kassel), a church body united in administration comprising Lutheran, some Reformed and United congregations with 822,000 parishioners in 1922
- Evangelical State Church in Hesse (Darmstadt; People's State of Hesse; German:Evangelische Landeskirche in Hessen), a church body united in administration comprising mostly Lutheran, some Reformed and United congregations with 848,000 parishioners in 1922
- Lippe State Church (German: Lippische Landeskirche), a Reformed church body, however also comprising 4 Lutheran congregations with 143,000 parishioners in 1922
- Evangelical Lutheran Church in the Lübeckian State (German:Evangelisch-Lutherische Kirche im Lübeckischen Staate), Lutheran with 111,000 parishioners in 1922
- Evangelical Lutheran State Church of the Oldenburgian Region of Lübeck (German:Evangelisch-Lutherische Landeskirche des oldenburgischen Landesteils Lübeck), Lutheran
- Lutheran Church in Upper Lusatia (German: Lutherische Kirche in der Oberlausitz). In 1926 the Upper Lusatian Lutheran church body merged in the Saxon Lutheran state church.
- Evangelical Lutheran Church of Mecklenburg-Schwerin (German: Evangelisch-lutherische Kirche von Mecklenburg-Schwerin), Lutheran with 614,000 parishioners in 1922
- Mecklenburg-Strelitz State Church (German: Mecklenburg-Strelitzer Landeskirche), Lutheran with 101,000 parishioners in 1922
- Evangelical State Church in Nassau (German: Evangelische Landeskirche in Nassau), a church body united in administration comprising mostly United and few Lutheran congregations
- Evangelical Lutheran Church of the Region of Oldenburg (German: Evangelisch-lutherische Kirche des Landesteils Oldenburg), a Lutheran church body, however, comprising 1 Reformed congregation with 291,000 parishioners in 1922
- United Protestant Evangelical Christian Church of the Palatinate (Palatine State Church) (German: Vereinigte protestantisch-evangelisch-christliche Kirche der Pfalz (Pfälzische Landeskirche)), united by confession with 506,000 parishioners in 1922
- Evangelical Church of the old-Prussian Union (German: Evangelische Kirche der altpreußischen Union; ApU, EKapU), a church body united in administration comprising mostly Lutheran, some Reformed and united congregations with 18,000,000 parishioners in 1922
- Evangelical Lutheran Church in Reuss Elder Line (German: Evangelisch-lutherische Kirche in Reuß ältere Linie), Lutheran with 70,000 parishioners in 1922
- Evangelical Lutheran State Church of the Free State of Saxony(German: Evangelisch-lutherische Landeskirche des Freistaats Sachsen), Lutheran with 4,509,000 parishioners in 1922
- Evangelical Lutheran State Church of Schaumburg-Lippe (German: Evangelisch-lutherische Landeskirche von Schaumburg-Lippe), Lutheran with 44,000 parishioners in 1922
- Evangelical Lutheran Church of Schleswig-Holstein (German: Evangelisch-Lutherische Landeskirche Schleswig-Holsteins), Lutheran with 1,361,000 parishioners in 1922
- Thuringian Evangelical Church (German: Thüringer evangelische Kirche), Lutheran with 1,384,000 parishioners in 1922
- United Evangelical State Church of Waldeck and Pyrmont (German: Vereinigte evangelische Landeskirche von Waldeck und Pyrmont), a church body united in administration comprising mostly Lutheran and few Reformed congregations with 65,000 parishioners in 1922
- Evangelical State Church in Württemberg (German: Evangelische Landeskirche in Württemberg), Lutheran, though not mentioned in the official name with 1,668,000 parishioners in 1922

=== Associated members ===
- Evangelical Church of Augsburg Confession and Helvetic Confession in Austria (German: Evangelische Kirche Augsburgischen and Helvetischen Bekenntnisses in Österreich, as of 1926)
- Synod of Rio Grande in Brazil (Riograndenser Synode/Sínodo Rio-Grandense; renamed as Igreja Evangélica de Confissão Luterana no Brasil as of 1968)
- Province of Germany of the Unitas Fratrum (Moravian Church) (German: Evangelische Brüderunität in Deutschland)
