= Joachim Hossenfelder =

Joachim Hossenfelder (29 April 1899, Cottbus – 28 June 1976, Lübeck) was a German Protestant theologian. He led the Nazi German Christians in the ecclesiastical ministry of the German Evangelical Church until 1933.

== Works ==
- Die Richtlinien der deutschen Christen. ed. Joachim Hossenfelder. Berlin 1932
- Unser Kampf (= Schriftenreihe der „Deutschen Christen“. Heft 1). M. Grevemeyer, Berlin-Charlottenburg 1933, OCLC 236223312; 2nd ed. Gesellschaft für Zeitungsdienst, Berlin; H. G. Wallmann, Leipzig 1933
- Volk und Kirche. Die amtlichen Berichte der ersten Reichstagung 1933 der Glaubensbewegung „Deutsche Christen“ (= Schriftenreihe der „Deutschen Christen“. Heft 4). Berlin, 1933, OCLC 316205354 (Tagungsband); 2nd & 3rd eds. Grevemeyer, Berlin-Charlottenburg 1933.
