= German Evangelical Church =

Protestant Reich church

- Deutsche Evangelische Kirche
- Flag of the Protestant Churches in Germany
- Classification: Protestant (German Christian)
- Scripture: The Message of God (1940)
- Theology: Lutheran (Positive Christian)
- Polity: Episcopal (1933-1935); Synodal (1935-1937)
- Bishop of the Reich: Ludwig Müller (1933-1935)
- Chairman: Wilhelm Zoellner (1935-1937)
- Territory: German Reich
- Founder: German Christians movement
- Origin: 1933
- Absorbed: German Protestant Church Confederation
- Separations: Confessing Church; Evangelical Lutheran Church in Bavaria right of the Rhine; Evangelical-Lutheran Church of Hanover; Evangelical Church of Westphalia; Evangelical-Lutheran Church in Württemberg
- Merged into: Evangelical Church in Germany
- Defunct: 1945

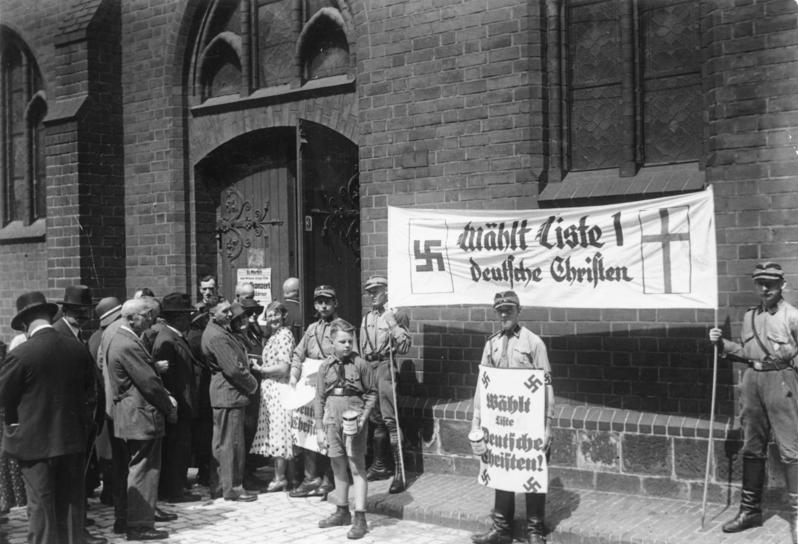
Stormtroopers holding German Christians movement propaganda during the Church Council elections on 23 July 1933, at St. Mary's Church, Berlin

The German Evangelical Church (German: Deutsche Evangelische Kirche) was a successor to the German Protestant Church Confederation from 1933 until 1945. It is also known in English as the Protestant Reich Church (German: Evangelische Reichskirche) and colloquially as the Reich Church (German: Reichskirche).

The German Christians movement, an antisemitic and racist pressure group and movement, gained enough power on boards of the member churches to be able to install Ludwig Müller to the office of Reichsbischof in the 1933 church elections. The German Protestant Church Confederation was subsequently renamed the German Evangelical Church. In 1934, the German Evangelical Church suffered controversies and internal struggles which left member churches either detached or reorganised into German Christians-led dioceses of what was to become a single, unified Reich Church compatible with Nazi ideology for all of Nazi Germany.

In 1935, in wake of controversies and church struggles, the Ministry for Church Affairs removed Ludwig Müller and installed a committee headed by Wilhelm Zoellner to lead the confederation. As a result, the German Evangelical Church regained partial support as some of the member churches that left rejoined. In 1936, the Zoellner committee denounced German Christians and increasingly leaned towards the Confessing Church and its positions. In 1937, the Nazis removed the Zoellner committee and reinstalled German Christians into the leading position. In 1937–1945, the German Evangelical Church was controlled by German Christians and the Ministry. It was no longer considered a subject to the Kirchenkampf (struggle of the churches) to Adolf Hitler. It officially disbanded in 1945 after the war ended. It was succeeded by the Protestant Church in Germany in 1948.

== Overview ==
In 1933, the German Christians movement took leadership in some member churches of the German Protestant Church Confederation. A new designation was voted on and adopted, with the organisation now being called the German Evangelical Church. In its early stages, it remained a loose confederation of churches just like its predecessor. It included the vast majority of Protestants in what was now Nazi Germany, excluding those affiliated with the free churches like the Evangelical Lutheran Free Church. In a 1933 vote to the Reichssynode, the German Christians were able to elect Ludwig Müller, a pro-Nazi pastor, to the office of Reichsbischof ("Reich Bishop"). On 20 December 1933, Müller merged the church's Protestant youth organisations into the Hitler Jugend without consulting their leadership or any member churches. Many in the German Evangelical Church resisted this idea and a discussion began.

Müller tried to silence it by introducing discipline and using the powers of the elected office. His attempts failed, prompting Adolf Hitler to meet with Protestant leaders on 25 January 1934. Although the meeting ended with Protestant churches declaring their loyalty to the state, removing Müller was not a subject to discussion for Hitler. After that, member churches began to either reorganise or detach from the German Evangelical Church. Initially, there was little resistance to the attempt to introduce elements of Nazi ideology into church doctrine. Most of the resistance came from confessing communities (bekennende Gemeinden) within "intact" and "destroyed churches" (see below) and the Pfarrernotbund (Emergency Covenant of Pastors) led by pastor Martin Niemöller.

In consequence of the 1934 meeting, many member churches distanced themselves from the increasingly Nazi-controlled Reich Church due to controversies pertaining to its constitution, the nazification of its theology, leadership, incorporation of its youth organisations into the Hitler Jugend, etc. Such churches became neutral or followed the Protestant opposition to Nazism that established an alternative umbrella organisation of their own that became known as the Confessing Church. The Reich Church ultimately ended up being a confederation of those German Protestant churches that espoused a single doctrine named Positive Christianity, which was compatible with Nazism. Although it aimed to eventually become a unified Protestant state church for all of Nazi Germany, this attempt utterly failed as the German Evangelical Church became fractured into various groups that bore an unclear legal status in relation to each other:

- churches with a German Christians-dominated governing board reorganising them into dioceses of the Reich Church led by German Christians movement ("dioceses of the German Evangelical Church" [Bistümer der Deutschen Evangelischen Kirche] in official usage, or "destroyed churches" [zerstörte Kirchen] in the parlance of the Confessing Church)
- churches with a governing board without a German Christian majority merging them as members of the Reich Church, but rejected Müller as its leader (the Churches of Bavaria, of Hanover, of Westphalia, and of Württemberg) ("intact churches" [intakte Kirchen] in Confessing Church parlance)
- the Confessing Church that saw itself as the true Protestant church for all of Germany, provided resistance to the German Christians-led German Evangelical Church and to its so-called dioceses ("destroyed churches"), and acted on principles of the "1934 church emergency law of Dahlem" that deemed the constitution of the German Evangelical Church "shattered" (the "Confessing Church", Bekennende Kirche)

Müller's influence declined after more constant clashes in the German Evangelical Church, triggering the foundation of the Ministry for Church Affairs led by Hans Kerrl on 16 July 1935. A decree, issued by Kerrl in September 1935, appointed a committee led by Wilhelm Zoellner (Church of Westphalia) to head the Reich Church instead of Müller. It was received positively by intact churches and even confessing parts of the German Evangelical Church. In 1936, the committee denounced the teachings of the German Christians-controlled Church of Thuringia, and the regime feared that the Confessing Church would gain more support due to this. In February 1937, the committee was removed by the Nazis and leading figures of the Protestant resistance like Dietrich Bonhoeffer, Martin Niemöller and others were arrested. In 1939, Müller tried to regain his position in the German Evangelical Church but failed to do so. After 1937, the German Evangelical Church was not considered an issue in the Kirchenkampf by the Nazis as it became heavily controlled by the Ministry until 1945.

In August 1945, the German Evangelical Church was officially dissolved by the council of the newly founded Protestant umbrella organisation called the Protestant Church in Germany.

== Beginnings, German Christians and Nazi influence (1933–1934) ==
Under the Weimar Republic, the system of state churches disappeared with the German monarchies. At this point, the unification of the Protestant churches into a single organisation seemed like a possibility, albeit a remote one. Since unification, clergy and ecclesiastical administrators had discussed a merger, but one had never materialised due to strong regional self-confidence and traditions as well as the denominational fragmentation of Lutheran, Calvinist and United churches. In 1920, Swiss Protestant churches came together in the Schweizerischer Evangelischer Kirchenbund (SEK). Following their example, the then 28 territorially defined German Protestant churches founded the Deutscher Evangelischer Kirchenbund (DEK) in 1922. This was not a merger into a single church but a loose federation of independent ones.

The founding of the German Evangelical Church was the result of work by the Kirchenpartei of the German Christians who had gained a large majority at the 1933 church elections. In September 1934, the merger finally failed when the synods of two of the 28 churches, the Evangelical Lutheran Church in Bavaria right of the river Rhine, the portion of Bavaria which forms today's Free State (without the Palatinate left of the Rhine), and the Evangelical State Church in Württemberg, refused to dissolve their church bodies as independent entities, and the Berlin-based Landgericht I court restored the largest church body, the by then already merged Evangelical Church of the Old-Prussian Union by its resolution in November the same year, thus resuming independence. Consequently, the German Evangelical Church, created as a merger, then continued to exist as a mere umbrella.

== Controversies, internal struggles and conflict with the Confessing Church (1934–1937) ==
Some Protestant functionaries and laymen opposed the unification. Many more agreed but wanted it under Protestant principles, not imposed by Nazi partisans. The Protestant opposition had organised first among pastors by way of the Emergency Covenant of Pastors and then—including laymen—developed into grassroots meetings establishing independent synods by January 1934. At the first Reich's Synod of Confession (erste Reichsbekenntnissynode) held in Wuppertal-Barmen between 29 and 31 May 1934, it called itself the Confessing Church.

On 16 July 1935, Hanns Kerrl was appointed Reichsminister for Church Affairs, a newly created department. He started negotiations to find a compromise and dropped the extreme German Christians, trying to win moderate Confessing Christians and respected neutrals. On 24 September 1935, a new law empowered Kerrl to legislate by way of ordinances within the German Evangelical Church, circumventing any synodal autonomy.

Kerrl managed to gain the very respected Wilhelm Zoellner (a Lutheran, until 1931 General Superintendent of the old-Prussian ecclesiastical province of Westphalia) to form the Reich's Ecclesiastical Committee (Reichskirchenausschuss, RKA) on 3 October 1935, combining the neutral and moderate groups to reconcile the disputing church parties. The official German Evangelical Church became subordinate to the new bureaucracy, and Müller lost power but still retained the now meaningless titles of German Reich's Bishop and old-Prussian State Bishop.

In November, Kerrl decreed the parallel institutions of the Confessing Church were to be dissolved, a move which was protested and ignored by Confessing Church leaders. On 19 December, Kerrl issued a decree which forbade all kinds of Confessing Church activities, namely appointments of pastors, education, examinations, ordinations, ecclesiastical visitations, announcements and declarations from the pulpit, separate financial structures and convening Synods of Confession; further the decree established provincial ecclesiastical committees. Thus, the brethren councils had to go into hiding, and Kerrl successfully wedged the Confessing Church.

The Gestapo increased its suppression, undermining the readiness for compromises among the Confessing Church. Zoellner concluded that this made his reconciliatory work impossible and criticised the Gestapo activities. He resigned on 2 February 1937, paralysing the Ecclesiastical Committee which lost all recognition among the opposition. Kerrl now subjected Müller's chancery of the German Evangelical Church directly to his ministry and the national, provincial and state ecclesiastical committees were soon after dissolved.

== German Christian takeover until dissolution (1937–1945) ==
Although the church was initially supported by the regime, the Nazis eventually lost interest in the experiment after it failed to supplant or absorb traditional Protestant churches. After 1937, relations between the Reich Church and the Nazi government began to sour.

On 19 November 1938, as reported on in the Ludington Daily News, YHWH was ordered to be erased from Protestant churches within the Evangelical Church of the old-Prussian Union by Friedrich Werner, the president of its executive board (Evangelical Supreme Church Council; EOK). His order said the name of the 'God of Israel' (which contemporarily has Judaic connotations) must be obliterated wherever it was displayed in Protestant churches.

On 1 September 1939, Kerrl decreed the separation of the ecclesiastical and the administrative governance within the official Evangelical Church. The German Christian Friedrich Werner, president of EOK, won over August Marahrens, State Bishop of the "intact" Church of Hanover, and the theologians Walther Schultz, a German Christian, and Friedrich Hymmen, vice president of the Old-Prussian Evangelical Supreme Church Council, to form an Ecclesiastical Council of Confidence (Geistlicher Vertrauensrat). This council exercised ecclesiastical leadership for the church from early 1940 and afterwards.

On 22 December 1941, the German Evangelical Church issued a request for the relevant authorities "to take suitable measures so that baptized non-Aryans remain separate from the ecclesiastical life of the German congregations", a call for strict segregation between "non-Aryan" Protestants, and German Protestant congregations and facilities. Many German Christian-dominated congregations followed suit. The Confessing Church's executive together with the conference of the state brethren councils (representing the Confessing Church adherents within the destroyed churches) issued a declaration of protest.

After World War II, Theophil Wurm, Landesbischof of Württemberg, invited representatives of the surviving German regional Protestant church bodies to Treysa for 31 August 1945. As to co-operation between the Protestant churches in Germany, strong resentments prevailed, especially among the Lutheran church bodies of Bavaria right of the river Rhine, the Hamburgian State, Hanover, Mecklenburg, Saxony, and Thuringia, against any unification after the experiences during Nazi rule. It was decided to replace the former German Federation of Protestant Churches with the new umbrella Protestant Church in Germany, provisionally led by the Council of the Protestant Church in Germany, a naming borrowed from the Reich's brethren council organisation.

== Reichsbischöfe ==
- Friedrich von Bodelschwingh (1933)
- Ludwig Müller (1933–1945)

== See also ==
- Kirchenkampf
- Religious views of Adolf Hitler
- Hitler's Table Talk
- Religion in Nazi Germany
- Confessing Church
- Karl Fezer
