= German Christians movement =

Nazi-era movement within the German Evangelical Church

Flag of the German Christians movement (1934)

German Christians (German: Deutsche Christen) were a pressure group and a movement within the German Evangelical Church that existed between 1933 and 1945, aligned towards the antisemitic, racist, and Führerprinzip ideological principles of Nazism with the goal of aligning German Protestantism as a whole towards those principles. Their advocacy of these principles led to a schism within 23 of the initially 28 regional church bodies (Landeskirchen) in Germany and the attendant foundation of the opposing Confessing Church in 1934. Siegfried Leffler was a co-founder of the German Christians movement.

== History ==
=== Antecedents ===
==== Imperial Germany ====
During the period of the German Empire, before the Weimar Republic, the Protestant churches (Landeskirchen) in Germany were divided along state and provincial borders. Each state or provincial church was supported by and affiliated with the regnal house—if it was Protestant—in its particular region; the crown provided financial and institutional support to its church. Church and state were therefore, to a large extent, combined on a regional basis. Monarchies of Roman Catholic dynasties also organised church bodies that were territorially defined by their state borders. The same was true for the three republican German states within the pre-1918 Empire. In Alsace-Lorraine the Napoleonic system of établissements publics du culte for the Calvinist, Jewish, Lutheran, and Roman Catholic congregations and umbrellas remained in effect.

==== Austria-Hungary ====
Karl Lueger's antisemitic Christian Social Party is sometimes viewed as a model for Adolf Hitler's Nazism. Hitler praised Lueger in his book Mein Kampf as an inspiration. In 1943, Nazi Germany produced the biographical film Vienna 1910 about Lueger; the film was awarded the standing of "special political value".

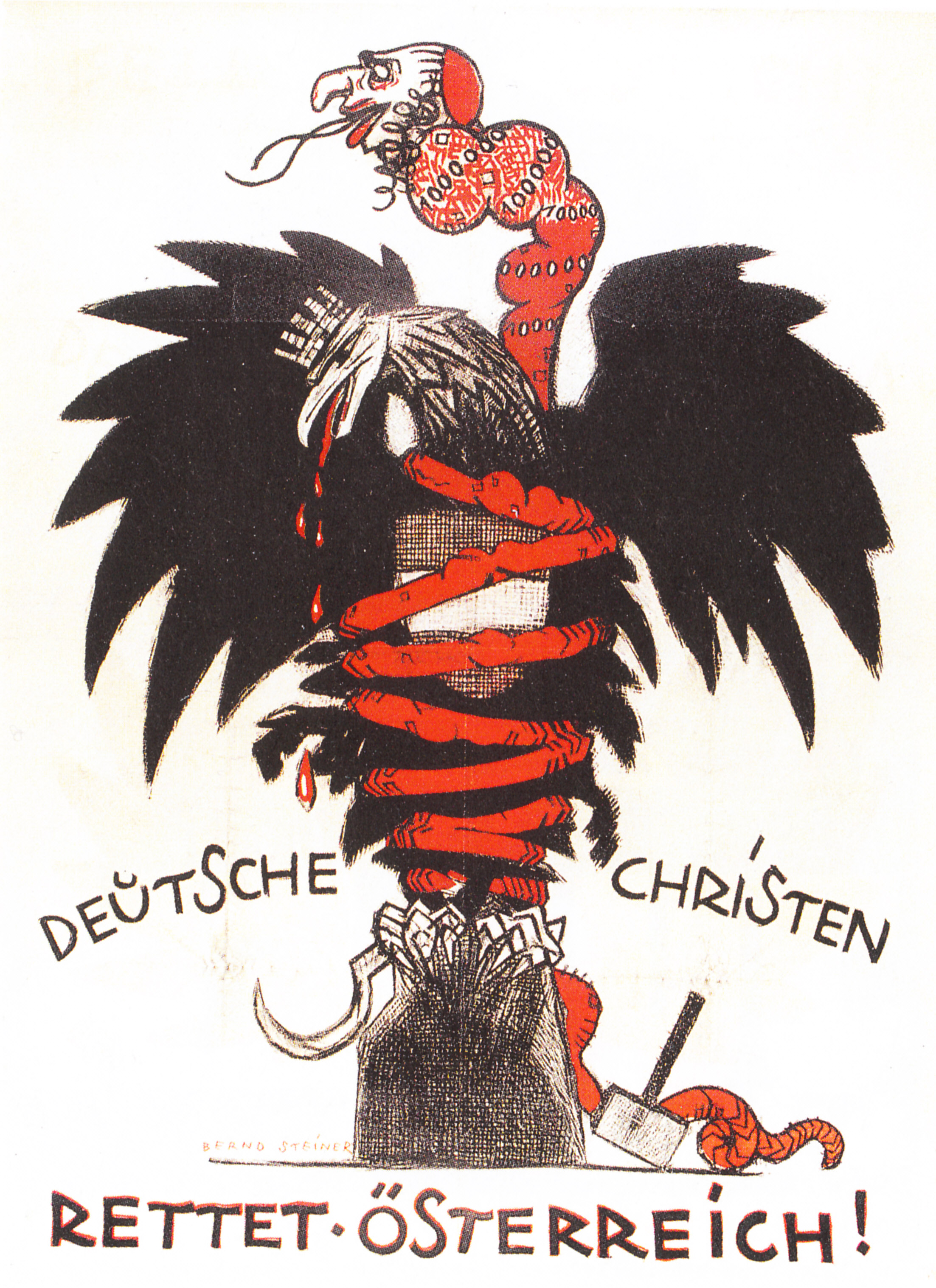
Antisemitic Christian Social Party poster of 1920, depicting a Judeo-Bolshevik serpent choking the Austrian eagle; Text: "German Christians – Save Austria!"

==== Weimar Republic ====
With the end of World War I and the resulting political and social turmoil, the regional churches lost their secular rulers. With revolutionary fervor in the air, the conservative church leaders had to contend with socialists who favoured disestablishment.

After considerable political maneuvering, state churches were abolished (in name) under the new Weimar government, but the anti-disestablishmentarians prevailed in substance: churches remained public corporations and retained their subsidies from the government. Religious instruction in the schools continued, as did the theological faculties in the universities. The rights formerly held by the princes in the German Empire simply devolved to church councils.

Accordingly, in this initial period of the Weimar Republic, the Protestant Church in Germany now operated as a federation of 28 regional (or provincial) churches. The federation operated officially through the representative German Evangelical Church Confederation (Deutscher Evangelischer Kirchenbund (DEKB)); the League was itself established in 1922 by the rather loose annual convention called Church General Assembly (Kirchentag), which was composed of the members of the various regional churches. The League was governed and administered by a 36-member Executive Committee (Kirchenausschuss) which was responsible for ongoing governance between the annual conventions of the Kirchentag.

Save for the organisational matters under the jurisdiction of the national League, the regional churches remained independent in other matters, including theology, and the federal system allowed for a great deal of regional autonomy.

=== Nazi Germany ===
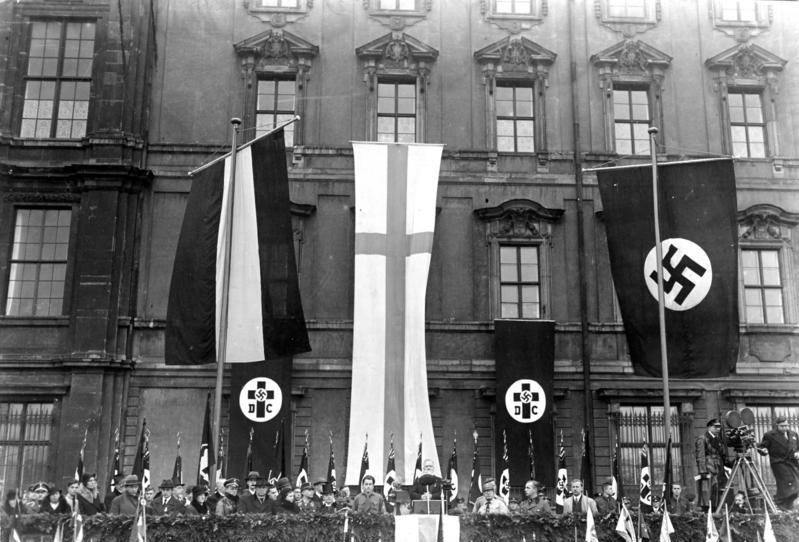
German Christians celebrating Luther-Day in Berlin in 1933

==== Ideology ====
The German Christians were, for the most part, a "group of fanatically Nazi Protestants." They began as an interest group and eventually came to represent one of the schismatic factions of German Protestantism.

Their movement was sustained and encouraged by factors such as:

- the 400th anniversary (in 1917) of Martin Luther's publication of the Ninety-five Theses in 1517, an event which endorsed German nationalism, stoked hostility toward foreign peoples, granted Germany a preferred place in the Protestant tradition, and legitimised antisemitism;
- the antisemitic writings of Martin Luther (e.g., On the Jews and Their Lies);
- the Luther Renaissance Movement of Professor Emmanuel Hirsch; supported by publications by Guida Diehl, the first speaker of the National Socialist Women's League;
- the revival of völkisch traditions;
- the de-emphasis of the Old Testament in Lutheran theology, and the partial or total removal of Jewishness from the Bible;
- the respect for temporal (secular) authority, which had been emphasised by Luther. The movement used scriptural support (Romans 13) to justify this position.

The German Christians were sympathetic to the Nazi regime's goal of "co-ordinating" (see Gleichschaltung) the individual Protestant churches into a single and uniform Reich church, consistent with the Volk ethos and the Führerprinzip.

The editor Professor Wilhelm Knevels of the journal Christentum und Leben (i.e., Christianity and Life) also worked for the "Institute for Research and the Elimination of Jewish influence on German Church Life"; his journal published articles like "Heroic Christianity" ("Heroisches Christentum", 1935) and "Why not only God? Why Jesus?" ("Warum nicht nur Gott? Warum Jesus?", April 1942).

The "Martin Luther Memorial Church" (Martin-Luther-Gedächtniskirche), which was built in Berlin from 1933 to 1935 included a pulpit that showed the Sermon on the Mount with a Stahlhelm-wearing Wehrmacht soldier listening to Jesus and a baptismal font which featured an SA stormtrooper. The swastikas were removed after the war and the former church has been reconstructed as a memorial to Nazi crimes against humanity.

Under the authority of Alfred Rosenberg and his religious theories, the Protestant minister Wilhelm Brachmann established an Institute of Religious Studies as part of the Advanced School of the NSDAP.

==== Formation ====
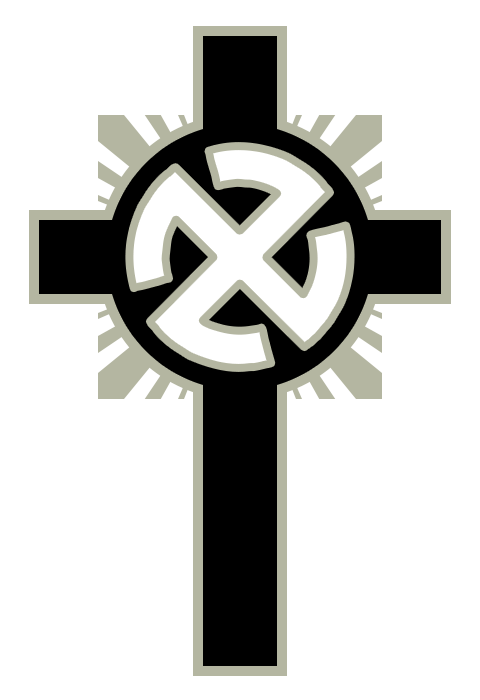
A symbol used by the German Christians movement

The German Christians were organised as a Kirchenpartei (church party; i.e., a nominating group) in 1931 to help win elections of presbyteries and synods (i.e., legislating church assemblies) in the Evangelical Church of the old-Prussian Union, the largest of the independent Landeskirchen. They were led by Ludwig Müller, a rather incompetent "old fighter" who had no particular leadership skills or qualifications, except having been a longtime faithful Nazi. He was advised by Emanuel Hirsch. In 1931, the book Salvation from chaotic madness by Guida Diehl, the first speaker of the National Socialist Women's League, got an admiring review by the Nationalsozialistische Monatshefte—she was praised for fighting against the "ridicule of Christ" and "showing the way for German Christians". The Berlin section was founded by Wilhelm Kube in 1932. The group achieved no particular notoriety before the Nazi assumption of political power in January 1933. In the Prussian church elections of November 1932, German Christians won one-third of the vote.

Hitler was appointed Chancellor on 30 January 1933 and the process of Gleichschaltung was in its full sway in the first few months of the regime. In late April 1933, the leadership of the 1922-founded German Evangelical Church Confederation, in the spirit of the new regime, agreed to write a new constitution for a brand new, unitary, "national" church, which would be called the German Evangelical Church (Deutsche Evangelische Kirche, or DEK). The new and unified national DEK would completely replace and supersede the old federated church with its representative league.

This church reorganisation had been a goal of the German Christians for some time, as such a centralisation would enhance the coordination of Church and State, as a part of the overall Nazi process of Gleichschaltung. The German Christians agitated for Müller to be elected as the new Church's bishop (Reichsbischof).

==== Bishopric ====
Müller had poor political skills, little political support within the Church, and no real qualifications for the job, other than his commitment to Nazism and a desire to exercise power. When the federation council met in May 1933 to approve the new constitution, it elected Friedrich von Bodelschwingh as Reichsbischof of the new Protestant Reich Church by a wide margin, largely on the advice and support of the church leadership.

Hitler was infuriated with the rejection of his candidate, and things began to change. By June 1933, the German Christians had gained leadership of some Landeskirchen within the DEK and were, of course, supported by Nazi propaganda in their efforts to reverse the humiliating loss to Bodelschwingh. After a series of Nazi-directed political maneuvers, Bodelschwingh resigned and Müller was appointed as the new Reichsbischof in July 1933.

==== Aryan paragraph ====
Further pro-Nazi developments followed the elevation of Müller to the DEK bishopric: In late summer, the old-Prussian general synod (led by Müller) adopted the Aryan paragraph, effectively defrocking clergy of Jewish descent and even clergy married to non-Aryans.

With their Gleichschaltungspolitik and their attempts to incorporate the Aryan paragraph into the church constitution so as to exclude Jewish Christians, the German Christians entered into a Kirchenkampf with other evangelical Christians. Their opponents founded the Confessing Church in 1934, which condemned the German Christians as heretics and claimed to be the true German Protestant Church.

==== Impact ====
Logos used by the German Christians movement in 1932, 1935, and 1937

The Nazis found the German Christians useful during the initial consolidation of power, but removed most of its leaders from their posts shortly afterwards; Reichsbischof Müller continued until 1945, but his power was effectively removed in favor of a government agency as a result of his obvious incompetence.

The German Christians were supportive of the Nazi Party's ideas about race. They issued public statements in which they claimed that Christians in Germany with Jewish ancestors "remain Christians in a New Testament sense, but they are not German Christians." They also supported the Nazi Party platform's advocacy of "Positive Christianity", a form of Christianity that did not stress the belief in human sinfulness. Some of them went so far as to call for the total removal of all Jewish elements from the Bible, including the Old Testament. Their symbol was a traditional Christian cross with a swastika in the middle and the group's German initials "D" and "C".

It was claimed and remembered by the German Christians, as a "fact", that the Jews had killed Christ, which appealed to and actively encouraged existing antisemitic sentiments among Christians in Nazi Germany.

=== Precursors ===
==== 19th century ====
The forerunner of the ideology of the German Christians came from certain Protestant groups of the German Empire. These groups sought a return to perceived völkisch, nationalistic, and racist ideas within traditional Christianity, and looked to turn Christianity in Germany into a reformed intrinsic folk-religion (German: arteigene Volksreligion). They found their model in the Berlin Hofprediger Adolf Stoecker, who was politically active and tried to position the Christian working-classes and lower-middle-classes against what he perceived as Jewish Überfremdung.

The Bayreuther Blätter devoted its June 1892 issue to a memorial of Paul de Lagarde and it emphatically recommended his work to its readers. Ludwig Schemann, one of the most prolific of Bayreuth Germanics and racists, and later the author of a full-length biography of Lagarde, summarised his life and work and concluded that "for the comprehension of Lagarde's whole being one must above all remember that he always considered himself the prophet and guide of his people — which of course he actually was." For Schemann his legacy consisted largely of his struggle against the Jews: "Not since the days of Schopenhauer and Wagner is the German thinker so mightily opposed this alien people, which desecrates our holy possessions, poisons our people, and seeks to wrest our property from us so as to completely trample on us, as Lagarde has" It was this image of Lagarde, the antisemitic prophet of a purified and heroic Germany, which the political Wagnerites and the Bayreuther Blätter kept alive. Houston Stewart Chamberlain, Wagner's son-in-law and intellectual disciple, wrote: "For us, the Deutsche Schriften have for a long time belonged to our most precious books, and we consider Lagarde's unabashed exposure of the inferiority of Semitic religious instincts and the pernicious effects on Christianity as an achievement that deserves our admiration and gratitude."

In 1896 Arthur Bonus advocated a "Germanisation of Christianity". Max Bewer alleged in his 1907 book Der deutsche Christus (The German Christ), Jesus stemmed from German soldiers in the Roman garrison in Galilee and his preaching showed the influence of "German blood". He concluded that the Germans were the best Christians among all peoples, only prevented from the full flowering of their spiritual faculties by the materialistic Jews. Julius Bode, however, concluded that the Christianisation of the Germans was the imposition of an "un-German" religious understanding, and that Germanic feeling remained alien to it and so should remain exempt from it.

==== 20th century ====
On the 400th anniversary of the Protestant Reformation, in 1917, Flensburg pastor Friedrich Andersen, writer Adolf Bartels, and Hans Paul Freiherr von Wolzogen presented 95 Thesen on which a "German Christianity on a Protestant basis" should be founded. It stated:

The newer racial research has finally opened our eyes to the pernicious effects of the blood mixture between Germanic and un-German peoples and urges us, with all our forces, to strive to keep our Volkstum pure and closed. Religion is the inner strength and finest flower in the intellectual life of a people, but it can only strongly affect expression in popular culture ... a deep connection between Christianity and Germanness can only be achieved when it is released from this unnatural connection, wherever it stands nakedly approached by the Jewish religion.

For the authors of the Thesen, the "angry thunder-god" Jehovah was the same as the "Father" and "[Holy] Ghost", that Christ preached and that the Germans would have guessed. Childlike confidence in God and selfless love was, to them, the essence of the Germanic "people's-soul" in contrast to Jewish "menial fear of God" and "materialistic morality." Church was not an "institution for the dissemination of Judaism", and they felt religious and confirmation materials should no longer teach the Old Testament and the Ten Commandments, nor even the New Testament, which they held to be of Jewish influence that had to be "cleaned" so that the child Jesus could be used as a model for "self sacrifice" and "male heroism".

In 1920 minister Karl Gerecke published Biblical anti-Semitism in the Volksverlag of Ernst Boepple, one of the founders of the German Workers' Party.

Dietrich Eckart, an early mentor of Hitler, also emphasised the "manliness" of Jesus Christ and compared him to the Norse god Baldr.

In 1921 Andersen wrote Der deutsche Heiland (The German Saviour), in which he opposed Jewish migration as an apocalyptic decision:

Who will win, the six-cornered star or the Cross? — The question is, for now, not yet evident. The Jew goes on his way purposefully, in any case ... his deadly hatred will defeat his opponent. When the Christian Good Friday is celebrated, it should at least not weigh in his dreams; ... otherwise there could come a whole lot of terrible Golgothas, where Jews across the whole world dance their jubilee songs on the grave of Christianity as heirs of a murdering people, singing to the Jahu they destroyed.

Against the "contamination by Jewish ideas", mainly from the Old Testament, the Churches and Germany should (he argued) be "mutually benefits and supports", and then Christianity would win back its status as "a religion of the Volk and of the struggle" and "the great exploiter of humanity, the evil enemy of our Volk [would] finally be destroyed".

In the same year, 1921, the Protestant-dominated and völkisch-oriented League for German Churches (Bund für deutsche Kirche) was founded in Berlin. Andersen, pastor Ernst Bublitz, and teacher Kurd Joachim Niedlich brought out the twice-monthly The German Church (Die Deutsche Kirche) magazine, which in 12,000 articles advanced the Bund's ideas. Jesus should be a "tragic-Nordic figure" against the Old Testament's "religious idea", with the Old Testament replaced by a "German myth". Each biblical story was to be "measured under German feelings, so that German Christianity escapes from Semitic influence as Beelzebub did before the Cross."

In 1925 groups such as the Bund united with ten völkisch, Germanophile, and antisemitic organisations to form the German Christian Working Group (deutschchristliche Arbeitsgemeinschaft). The Christian-Spirit Religious Society (Geistchristliche Religionsgesellschaft), founded in 1927 in Nuremberg by Artur Dinter, saw more effect in the churches, striving for the 'de-Judification' (Entjudung) and the building of a non-denominational People's Church (Volkskirche).

The proposed abolition of the Old Testament was in part fiercely opposed among Christian German nationalists, seeing it as a racist attack on the foundations of their faith from inside and outside. Theologian Johannes Schneider, a member of the German National People's Party (Deutschnationale Volkspartei or DNVP) (a party fairly close to the political aims of the NSDAP), wrote in 1925:

Whoever cheapens the Old Testament will soon also lose the New.

In 1927 the Protestant Church League (Deutscher Evangelischer Kirchenbund) reacted to the growing radicalisation of German Christian groups with a Churches Day in Königsberg, aiming to clarify Christianity's relation to "Fatherland", "Nation", "Volkstum", "Blood", and "Race". Many local church-officers tried to delineate, such as with regards to racism, but this only served to show how deeply it had intruded into their thinking. Paul Althaus, for example, wrote:

Volkstum is a spiritual reality ... certainly there will never be a Volkstum without the precondition of, for example, the blood unit. But once a Volkstum is begotten, it may exist as a spiritual reality ... even foreign blood may be lent [in]to it. How great the significance of blood might be in intellectual history, but the rule is, even if one is born into a Volkstum, the spirit and not the blood.

On this basis, the radical German-Christians' ideas were hardly slowed down. In 1928 they gathered in Thuringia to found the Thuringian German Christians' Church Movement (Thüringer Kirchenbewegung Deutsche Christen), seeking contact with the Nazi Party and naming their newsletter "Letters to German Christians" (German: Briefe an Deutsche Christen).

===== Pagan and anti-Christian trends =====
Alfred Rosenberg's book The Myth of the Twentieth Century (Der Mythus des 20. Jahrhunderts) resonated in these circles and gave them renewed impetus. His polemic against all "un-German" and "root-stock" elements in Christianity was directed against the Christianity and the denominational organisations of the time. Marxism and Catholic Internationalism were attacked as two facets of the Jewish spirit, and Rosenberg stated the need for a new national religion to complete the Reformation.

However, the book did not represent official NSDAP policy. During an interview with Bishop Wilhelm Berning of Osnabrück on 26 April 1933, Adolf Hitler explicitly rejected the work, stating that it was "not a Party book" and had not been written by Rosenberg in his capacity as a party representative.

The Associated German Religious Movement (Arbeitsgemeinschaft Deutsche Glaubensbewegung), founded in Eisenach at the end of 1933, was also an attempt to create a national religion outside and against the churches. It combined six earlier Nordic-völkisch oriented groups and a further five groups were represented by individual members. Jakob Wilhelm Hauer became the group's "leader and representative" by acclamation, and other members included philosopher Ernst Bergmann (1881–1945), racial ideologue Hans F. K. Günther, writer Ernst Graf zu Reventlow, historian Herman Wirth, Ludwig Fahrenkrog, and Lothar Stengel-von Rutkowski.

=== Attempts to "de-Judaise" the Bible ===
In 1939 with the approval of eleven of the German Protestant regional churches the Eisenacher Institute for the Study and Elimination of Jewish Influence on German Church Life (called the "Dejudaisation Institute") was founded, led by Siegfried Leffler and Walter Grundmann. One of its main tasks was to compile a "People's Testament" (Volkstestament) in the sense of what Rosenberg called a "Fifth Gospel", to announce the myth of the "Aryan Jesus". It became clear in 1994 that the Testament's poetic text was written by the famous ballad-poet and proprietor of the Eugen-Diederichs-Verlag, Lulu von Strauß und Torney. Despite broad church support for it (even many Confessing Christians advocated such an approach, in the hope that the disaffiliation of 1937 to 1940 could be curbed), the first edition of the text did not meet with the expected enthusiastic response.

=== After 1945 ===
After 1945, the remaining German Christian currents formed smaller communities and circles distanced from the newly formed umbrella of the independent church bodies Protestant Church in Germany. German Christian-related parties sought to influence the historiography of the Kirchenkampf in the so-called "church-historical working group", but they had little effect from then on in theology and politics. Other former members of the German Christians moved into the numerically insignificant religious communities known as the Free People's Christian Church (Freie Christliche Volkskirche) and the People's Movement of Free Church Christians (Volkskirchenbewegung Freie Christen) after 1945.

In 1980, in the context of a statement entitled "Towards Renovation of the Relationship of Christians and Jews (Zur Erneuerung des Verhältnisses von Christen und Juden), the Synod of the Evangelical Church in the Rhineland stated that it recognised and "confess, with dismay, the co-responsibility and guilt of German Christians for the Holocaust." On May 6, 2019, eighty years after the founding of the “Dejudaisation Institute”, the Dejudaisation Institute Memorial was unveiled in Eisenach at the behest of eight Protestant regional churches. It is intended to be understood as the Protestant churches’ confession of guilt and as a memorial to the victims of the church’s anti-Judaism and antisemitism.

== See also ==
- Living Church, the analogous movement in the USSR
- Ariosophy
- Christian Identity
- Esoteric Nazism
- The Foundations of the Nineteenth Century
- Institute for the Study and Elimination of Jewish Influence on German Church Life
- List of white nationalist organisations
- Marcion of Sinope
- Race and appearance of Jesus
- Religious aspects of Nazism
- Religious views of Adolf Hitler

== Bibliography ==
=== English ===
- Barnes, Kenneth C. (1991). Nazism, Liberalism, & Christianity: Protestant social thought in Germany & Great Britain, 1925–1937. University Press of Kentucky. ISBN 0-8131-1729-1.
- Barnett, Victoria (1992). For the Soul of the People: Protestant Protest Against Hitler. Oxford University Press US. ISBN 0-19-512118-X.
- Benz, Wolfgang (2006). A Concise History of the Third Reich. University of California Press. ISBN 0-520-23489-8.
- Bergen, Doris L. (1996). Twisted Cross: The German Christian Movement in the Third Reich. Chapel Hill: UNC Press. (Bergen)
- Jochen Birkenmeier, Michael Weise (2020): Study and Eradication. The Church’s „Dejudaization Institute“, 1939–1945. Companion Volume to the Exhibition, Stiftung Lutherhaus Eisenach: Eisenach. ISBN 978-3-9818078-5-1
- Ericksen, Robert (2012). Complicity in the Holocaust: Churches and Universities in Nazi Germany. Cambridge: Cambridge University Press. ISBN 978-1-107-01591-3.
- Goldhagen, Daniel Jonah (1996). Hitler's Willing Executioners: Ordinary Germans and the Holocaust. New York: Knopf.
- Evans, Richard J. (2006). The Third Reich in Power. London: Penguin Books. ISBN 0-14-100976-4.
- Heschel, Susannah (2008). The Aryan Jesus : Christian theologians and the Bible in Nazi Germany. Princeton: Princeton University Press. ISBN 978-0-691-12531-2.
- Hockenos, Matthew D. (2004). A Church Divided: German Protestants Confront the Nazi Past. Bloomington: Indiana University Press. ISBN 978-0-253-34448-9.

=== German ===
- (in German) Friedrich Baumgärtel: Wider die Kirchenkampflegenden; Freimund Verlag 1976^{2} (1959^{1}), ISBN 3-86540-076-0
- (in German) Otto Diem: Der Kirchenkampf. Evangelische Kirche und Nationalsozialismus; Hamburg 1970^{2}
- (in German) Heiner Faulenbach: Artikel Deutsche Christen; in: RGG^{4}, 1999
- (in German) Rainer Lächele: Ein Volk, ein Reich, ein Glaube. Die „Deutschen Christen“ in Württemberg 1925–1960; Stuttgart 1994
- (in German) Kurt Meier: Die Deutschen Christen; Halle 1964 [Standardwerk]
- (in German) Kurt Meier: Kreuz und Hakenkreuz. Die evangelische Kirche im Dritten Reich; Munich 2001^{2}
- (in German) Klaus Scholder: Die Kirchen und das Dritte Reich
  - Volume 1: Vorgeschichte und Zeit der Illusionen, 1918–1934; Berlin 1977
  - Volume 2: Das Jahr der Ernüchterung 1934; Berlin 1985
- (in German) Günther van Norden u.a. (ed.): Wir verwerfen die falsche Lehre. Arbeits- und Lesebuch zur Barmer Theologischen Erklärung
- (in German) Marikje Smid: Deutscher Protestantismus und Judentum 1932–33; München: Christian Kaiser, 1990; ISBN 3-459-01808-9
- (in German) Hans Prolingheuer: Kleine politische Kirchengeschichte. 50 Jahre evangelischer Kirchenkampf; Cologne: Pahl-Rugenstein, 1984; ISBN 3-7609-0870-5
- (in German) Joachim Beckmann (eds): Kirchliches Jahrbuch für die evangelische Kirche in Deutschland 1933–1945. It: Evangelische Kirche im Dritten Reich, Gütersloh 1948
- (in German) Julius Sammetreuther: Die falsche Lehre der Deutschen Christen; Bekennende Kirche Heft 15; Munich 1934^{3}
- (in German) Leonore Siegele-Wenschkewitz (ed.): Christlicher Antijudaismus und Antisemitismus. Theologische und kirchliche Programme Deutscher Christen; Arnoldshainer Texte Band 85; Frankfurt/M.: Haag + Herchen Verlag, 1994; ISBN 3-86137-187-1

it (S. 201–234) Birgit Jerke: Wie wurde das Neue Testament zu einem sogenannten Volkstestament „entjudet“? Aus der Arbeit des Eisenacher „Instituts zur Erforschung und Beseitung des jüdischen Einflusses auf das deutsch kirchliche Leben“

- (in German) Karl Heussi: Kompendium der Kirchengeschichte; Tübingen: Mohr, 1981^{16}; ISBN 3-16-141871-9; S. 521–528
