= Religion in Nazi Germany =

Germany, under the Nazi regime, was an overwhelmingly Christian country. A census in May 1939, six years into the Nazi era and a year following the annexations of Austria and Czechoslovakia into Germany, indicates that 54% of the population considered itself Protestant, 41% considered itself Catholic, 3.5% self-identified as Gottgläubig (lit. 'believing in God'), and 1.5% as "atheist". Protestants were over-represented in the Nazi Party's membership and electorate, and Catholics were under-represented.

Smaller religious minorities such as the Jehovah's Witnesses and the Baháʼí Faith were banned in Germany, while the eradication of Judaism was attempted along with the genocide of Jews during the Holocaust. The Salvation Army became an adjunct of the NSV, and the Seventh-day Adventist Church was banned for a short time, but due to capitulation from church authorities, was later reinstated. Some religious minority groups had a more complicated relationship with the new state, such as the Church of Jesus Christ of Latter-day Saints (LDS), which withdrew its missionaries from Germany and Czechoslovakia in 1938. German LDS church branches were permitted to continue to operate throughout the war, but were forced to make some changes in their structure and teachings. The Nazi Party was frequently at odds with the Pope, who denounced the party by claiming that it had an anti-Catholic veneer.

There were differing views among the Nazi leaders as to the future of religion in Germany. Anti-Church radicals included Hitler's personal secretary Martin Bormann, the propagandist Alfred Rosenberg, and Reichsführer-SS Heinrich Himmler. Some Nazis, such as Hans Kerrl, who served as Hitler's Minister for Church Affairs, advocated "Positive Christianity", a uniquely Nazi form of Christianity that rejected Christianity's Jewish origins and the Old Testament, and portrayed "true" Christianity as a fight against Jews, with Jesus depicted as an Aryan.

Nazism wanted to transform the subjective consciousness of the German people – its attitudes, values and mentalities – into a single-minded, obedient "national community". The Nazis believed that they would therefore have to replace class, religious and regional allegiances. Under the Gleichschaltung (Nazification) process, Hitler attempted to create a unified Protestant Reich Church from Germany's 28 existing Protestant churches. The plan failed, and was resisted by the Confessing Church. Persecution of the Catholic Church in Germany followed the Nazi takeover. Hitler moved quickly to eliminate political Catholicism. Amid harassment of the Church, the Reich concordat treaty with the Vatican was signed in 1933, and promised to respect Church autonomy. Hitler routinely disregarded the Concordat, closing all Catholic institutions whose functions were not strictly religious. Clergy, nuns, and lay leaders were targeted, with thousands of arrests over the ensuing years. The Catholic Church accused the regime of "fundamental hostility to Christ and his Church". Multiple historians believe that the Nazis intended to eradicate traditional forms of Christianity in Germany after victory in the war.

== Background ==
Map of religion in Germany according to the 1925 census. Protestant Christianity (64.12%) Catholic Christianity (32.35%) Judaism and others (3.53%)

Christianity has ancient roots among Germanic peoples dating to the missionary work of Columbanus and St. Boniface in the 6th–8th centuries. The Reformation, initiated by Martin Luther in 1517, divided the German population between a two-thirds majority of Protestants and a one-third minority of Roman Catholics. The south and west remained mainly Catholic, while north and east became mainly Protestant. The Catholic Church enjoyed a degree of privilege in the Bavarian region, the Rhineland and Westphalia as well as parts in south-west Germany, while in the Protestant north, Catholics suffered some discrimination.

Bismarck's Kulturkampf ("Culture Struggle") of 1871–1878 had seen an attempt to assert a Protestant vision of German nationalism over Germany, and fused anticlericalism and suspicion of the Catholic population, whose loyalty was presumed to lie with Austria and France, rather than the new German Empire. The Centre Party had formed in 1870, initially to represent the religious interests of Catholics and Protestants, but was transformed by the Kulturkampf into the "political voice of Catholics". Bismarck's "Culture Struggle" failed in its attempt to eliminate Catholic institutions in Germany, or their strong connections outside of Germany, particularly various international missions and Rome.

In the course of the 19th century, both the rise of historical-critical scholarship of the Bible and Jesus by David Strauss, Ernest Renan and others, progress in the natural sciences, especially the field of evolutionary biology by Charles Darwin, Ernst Haeckel and others, and opposition to oppressive socioeconomic circumstances by Karl Marx, Friedrich Engels and others, and a rise in more liberal and progressive churches, resulted in increasing criticism of the traditional churches' dogmas, and moved numerous German citizens into rejecting traditional theological concepts and either following liberal forms of religion or discarded it altogether. By 1859, they had established the Bund Freireligiöser Gemeinden Deutschlands (literally "Union of Free Religious Communities of Germany"), an association of persons who consider themselves to be religious without adhering to any established and institutionalized church or sacerdotal cult. In 1881 in Frankfurt am Main, Ludwig Büchner established the German Freethinkers League (Deutscher Freidenkerbund) as the first German organisation for atheists and agnostics. In 1892 the Freidenker-Gesellschaft and in 1906 the Deutscher Monistenbund were formed.

In 1933, 5 years prior to the annexation of Austria into Germany, the population of Germany was approximately 67% Protestant and 33% Catholic, while the Jewish population was less than 1%.

Religious statistics of Germany, 1910–1939
Year	Total population	Protestant	Roman Catholic	Others (including Jews)	Jewish
1910^{a}	64,926,000	39,991,000 (61.6%)	23,821,000 (36.7%)	1,113,000 (1.7%)	615,000 (1.0%)
1925^{b}	62,411,000	40,015,000 (64.1%)	20,193,000 (32.4%)	2,203,000 (3.5%)	564,000 (0.9%)
1933^{b}	65,218,000	40,865,000 (62.7%)	21,172,000 (32.5%)	3,181,000 (4.8%)	500,000 (0.8%)
1933^{b}	65,218,000	43,696,060 (67.0%)	21,521,940 (33.0%)	(<1%)	– (<1%)
1939^{b}	69,314,000	42,103,000 (60.8%)	23,024,000 (33.2%)	4,188,000 (6.0%)	222,000 (0.3%)
1939^{c}	79,375,281	42,862,652 (54.0%)	31,750,112 (40.0%)	4,762,517 (6.0%)^{d}	-
a. German Empire borders.
b. Weimar Republic borders, i.e. German state borders of 31 December 1937.
c. Nazi Germany borders in May 1939. Official census data.
d. Including gottgläubig at 3.5%, irreligious people at 1.5%, and other faiths at 1.0%.

== Denominational trends during the Nazi period ==
Numbers leaving the Church 1932–1944
Year	Catholic	Protestant	Total
1932	52,000	225,000	277,000
1933	34,000	57,000	91,000
1934	27,000	29,000	56,000
1935	34,000	53,000	87,000
1936	46,000	98,000	144,000
1937	104,000	338,000	442,000
1938	97,000	343,000	430,000
1939	95,000	395,000	480,000
1940	52,000	160,000	212,000
1941	52,000	195,000	247,000
1942	37,000	105,000	142,000
1943	12,000	35,000	49,000
1944	6,000	17,000	23,000

Religion in Germany (1933)
1. Protestant (62.7%)
2. Roman Catholic (32.5%)
3. Judaism (0.80%)
4. Other religion or irreligious (4.00%)
Religion in Germany (1939, official census)
1. Protestant (54.0%)
2. Roman Catholic (40.0%)
3. Gottgläubig (3.50%)
4. Other (1.00%)
5. Irreligious (1.50%)

Christianity in Germany has, since the Protestant Reformation in 1517, been divided into Roman Catholicism and Protestantism. As a specific outcome of the Reformation in Germany, the large Protestant denominations are organized into Landeskirchen (roughly: Provincial Churches). The German word for denomination is Konfession. For the large churches in Germany (Catholic and Evangelical, i.e. Protestant) the German government collects the church tax, which is then given to these churches. For this reason, membership in the Catholic or the Evangelical Church is officially registered. It is apparent they were politically motivated. For this reason historian Richard Steigmann-Gall argues that "nominal church membership is a very unreliable gauge of actual piety in this context" and determining someone's actual religious convictions should be based on other criteria. It is important to keep this 'official aspect' in mind when turning to such questions as the religious beliefs of Adolf Hitler or Nazi Propaganda Minister Joseph Goebbels. Both men had ceased to attend Catholic mass or to go to confession long before 1933, but neither had officially left the Church and neither of them refused to pay their church taxes.

Historians have taken a look at the number of people who left their church in Germany during the 1933–1945 period. There was "no substantial decline in religious practice and church membership between 1933 and 1939". The option to be taken off the church rolls (Kirchenaustritt) has existed in Germany since 1873, when Otto von Bismarck had introduced it as part of the Kulturkampf aimed against Catholicism. For parity this was also made possible for Protestants, and for the next 40 years it was mostly them who took advantage of it. Statistics exist since 1884 for the Protestant churches and since 1917 for the Catholic Church.

An analysis of this data for the era of the Nazis' rule is available in a paper by Sven Granzow et al., published in a collection edited by Götz Aly. Altogether more Protestants than Catholics left their church, however, overall Protestants and Catholics decided similarly. One has to keep in mind that German Protestants were twice the number of Catholics. The spike in the numbers from 1937 to 1938 is the result of the annexation of Austria in 1938 and other territories. The number of Kirchenaustritte reached its "historical high" in 1939 when it peaked at 480,000. Granzow et al. see the numbers not only in relation to the Nazi policy towards the churches, (which changed drastically from 1935 onwards) but also as indicator of the trust in the Führer and the Nazi leadership. The decline in the number of people who left the church after 1942 is explained as resulting from a loss of confidence in the future of Nazi Germany. People tended to keep their ties to the church, because they feared an uncertain future.

According to Evans, those members of the affiliation gottgläubig (lit. 'believers in god a nondenominational nazified outlook on god beliefs often described as predominately based on creationist and deistic viewsref namebooksgooglede'), "were convinced Nazis who had left their Church at the behest of the Party, which had been trying since the mid 1930s to reduce the influence of Christianity in society". Heinrich Himmler was a strong promoter of the gottgläubig movement and did not allow atheists into the SS, arguing that their "refusal to acknowledge higher powers" would be a "potential source of indiscipline". The majority of the three million Nazi Party members continued to pay their church taxes and register as either Roman Catholic or Protestants.

Sicherheitsdienst des Reichsführers-SS (or SD) members withdrew from their Christian denominations, changing their religious affiliation to gottgläubig, while nearly 70% of the officers of the Schutzstaffel (SS) did the same.

== Nazi attitudes towards Christianity ==
Nazi ideology could not accept an autonomous establishment whose legitimacy did not spring from the government. It desired the subordination of the church to the state. Although the broader membership of the Nazi Party after 1933 came to include a number of Catholics and Protestants, aggressive anti-Church radicals like Joseph Goebbels, Alfred Rosenberg, Martin Bormann, and Heinrich Himmler saw the Kirchenkampf campaign against the Churches as a priority concern, and anti-Church and anticlerical sentiments were strong among grassroots party activists.

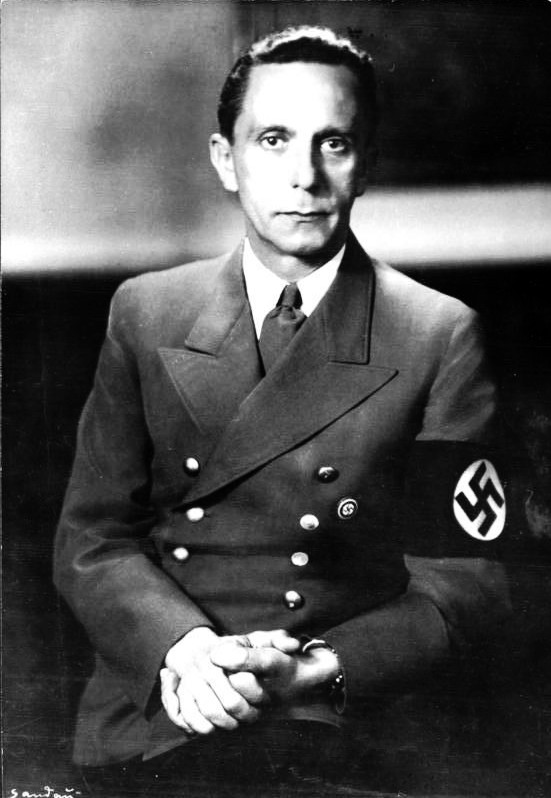
The Nazi propaganda minister, Joseph Goebbels, among the most aggressive anti-Church Nazis, wrote that there was "an insoluble opposition between the Christian and a heroic-German world view".

Goebbels saw an "insoluble opposition" between the Christian and Nazi world views. The Führer angered the churches by appointing Rosenberg as official Nazi ideologist in 1934. Heinrich Himmler saw the main task of his SS organization to be that of acting as the vanguard in overcoming Christianity and restoring a "Germanic" way of living. Hitler's chosen deputy, Martin Bormann, advised Nazi officials in 1941 that "National Socialism and Christianity are irreconcilable."

Hitler himself possessed radical instincts in relation to the conflict with the Churches in Germany. Though he occasionally spoke of wanting to delay the Church struggle and was prepared to restrain his anti-clericalism out of political considerations, his "own inflammatory comments gave his immediate underlings all the license they needed to turn up the heat in the Church Struggle, confident that they were 'working towards the Fuhrer,'" according to Kershaw. In public speeches, he portrayed himself and the Nazi movement as faithful Christians. In 1928 Hitler said in a speech: "We tolerate no one in our ranks who attacks the ideas of Christianity... in fact our movement is Christian." But according to the Goebbels Diaries, Hitler hated Christianity. In an 8 April 1941 entry, Goebbels wrote "He hates Christianity, because it has crippled all that is noble in humanity." In Bullock's assessment, though raised a Catholic, Hitler "believed neither in God nor in conscience", retained some regard for the organisational power of Catholicism, but had contempt for its central teachings, which he said, if taken to their conclusion, "would mean the systematic cultivation of the human failure". Bullock wrote: "In Hitler's eyes, Christianity was a religion fit only for slaves; he detested its ethics in particular. Its teaching, he declared, was a rebellion against the natural law of selection by struggle and the survival of the fittest."

As a measure in the struggle for power against the influence of the churches (Kirchenkampf), the Nazis tried to establish a "third denomination" called "Positive Christianity", aiming to replace the established churches to reduce their influence. Historians have suspected this was an attempt to start a cult which worshipped Hitler as the new Messiah. However, in a diary entry of 28 December 1939, Goebbels wrote that "the Fuhrer passionately rejects any thought of founding a religion. He has no intention of becoming a priest. His sole exclusive role is that of a politician." In Hitler's political relations dealing with religion he readily adopted a strategy "that suited his immediate political purposes."

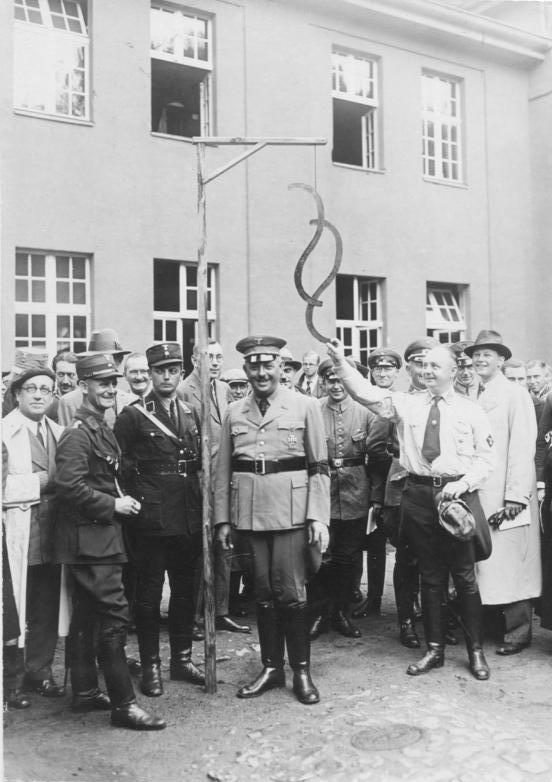
Hanns Kerrl (center). A relative moderate, as Reichsminister of Church Affairs, he described Hitler as the "herald of a new revelation" and said that Nazi-backed "Positive Christianity" was not dependent on the Apostles' Creed or belief in Christ as the son of God.

Many Nazi leaders, including Hitler, subscribed either to a mixture of pseudoscientific theories, such as Social Darwinism, mysticism, and occultism, which was especially strong in the SS. Central to both groupings was the belief in Germanic (white Nordic) racial superiority. The existence of a Ministry of Church Affairs, instituted in 1935 and headed by Hanns Kerrl, was hardly recognized by ideologists such as Alfred Rosenberg or by other political decision-makers. A relative moderate, Kerrl accused dissident churchmen of failing to appreciate the Nazi doctrine of "Race, blood and soil" and gave the following explanation of the Nazi conception of "Positive Christianity", telling a group of submissive clergy in 1937:

Dr Zoellner and [Catholic Bishop of Munster] Count Galen have tried to make clear to me that Christianity consists in faith in Christ as the son of God. That makes me laugh... No, Christianity is not dependent upon the [Apostles'] Creed... True Christianity is represented by the party, and the German people are now called by the party and especially the Fuehrer to a real Christianity... the Fuehrer is the herald of a new revelation.

We are no theologians, no representatives of the teaching profession in this sense, put forth no theology. But we claim one thing for ourselves: that we place the great fundamental idea of Christianity in the center of our ideology [Ideenwelt] – the hero and sufferer Christ himself stands in the center.

— Hans Schemm, Nazi Gauleiter

Prior to the Reichstag vote for the Enabling Act under which Hitler gained legislative powers with which he went on to permanently dismantle the Weimar Republic, Hitler promised the Reichstag on 23 March 1933, that he would not interfere with the rights of the churches. However, with power secured in Germany, Hitler quickly broke this promise. Various historians have written that the goal of the Nazi Kirchenkampf ("Church Struggle") entailed not only ideological struggle, but ultimately the eradication of the Churches. However, leading Nazis varied in the importance they attached to the Church Struggle.

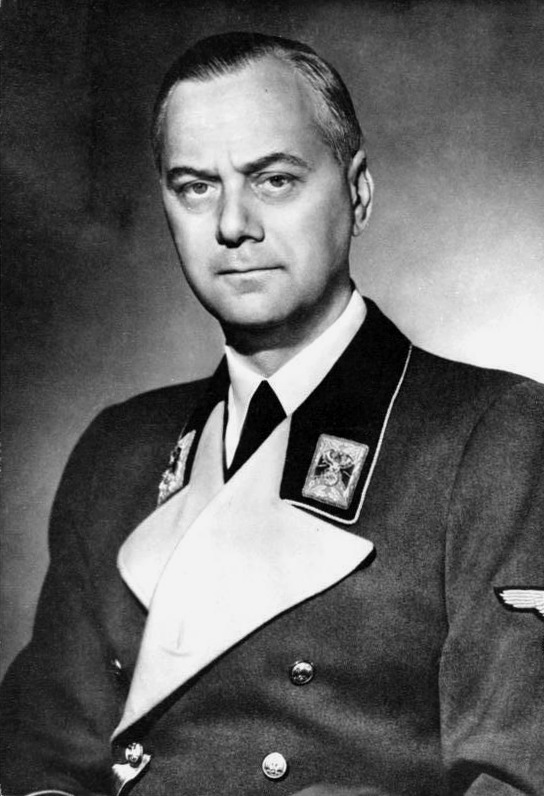
Alfred Rosenberg, the official Nazi philosopher. A proponent of "Positive Christianity", he planned the "extermination of the foreign Christian faiths imported into Germany", and for the Bible and Christian cross to be replaced with Mein Kampf and the swastika.

William Shirer wrote that "under the leadership of Rosenberg, Bormann and Himmler, who were backed by Hitler, the Nazi regime intended to destroy Christianity in Germany, if it could, and substitute the old paganism of the early tribal Germanic gods and the new paganism of the Nazi extremists." During a speech on 27 October 1941, President Franklin D. Roosevelt revealed evidence of Hitler's plan to abolish all religions in Germany, declaring:

Your Government has in its possession another document, made in Germany by Hitler's Government... It is a plan to abolish all existing religions—Catholic, Protestant, Mohammedan, Hindu, Buddhist, and Jewish alike. The property of all churches will be seized by the Reich and its puppets. The cross and all other symbols of religion are to be forbidden. The clergy are to be forever liquidated, silenced under penalty of the concentration camps, where even now so many fearless men are being tortured because they have placed God above Hitler.

But according to Steigman-Gall, some Nazis, like Dietrich Eckart (died 1923) and Walter Buch, saw Nazism and Christianity as part of the same movement. Aggressive anti-Church radicals like Goebbels and Bormann saw the conflict with the Churches as a priority concern, and anti-church and anti-clerical sentiments were strong among grassroots party activists.

Writing for Yad Vashem, the historian Michael Phayer wrote that by the latter 1930s, church officials knew that the long-term aim of Hitler was the "total elimination of Catholicism and of the Christian religion", but that given the prominence of Christianity in Germany, this was necessarily a long-term goal. According to Bullock, Hitler intended to destroy the influence of the Christian churches in Germany after the war. In his memoirs, Hitler's chief architect Albert Speer recalled that when drafting his plans for the "new Berlin", he consulted Protestant and Catholic authorities, but was "curtly informed" by Hitler's private secretary Martin Bormann that churches were not to receive building sites. Kershaw wrote that, in Hitler's scheme for the Germanization of Eastern Europe, he made clear that there would be "no place in this utopia for the Christian Churches".

Geoffrey Blainey wrote that Hitler and his fascist ally Mussolini were atheists, but that Hitler courted and benefited from fear among German Christians of militant communist atheism. (Other historians have characterised Hitler's mature religious position as a form of deism.) "The aggressive spread of atheism in the Soviet Union alarmed many German Christians", wrote Blainey, and with the Nazis becoming the main opponent of communism in Germany: "[Hitler] himself saw Christianity as a temporary ally, for in his opinion 'one is either a Christian or a German'. To be both was impossible. Nazism itself was a religion, a pagan religion, and Hitler was its high priest... Its high altar [was] Germany itself and the German people, their soil and forests and language and traditions". Nonetheless, a number of early confidants of Hitler detailed the Führer's complete lack of religious belief. One close confidant, Otto Strasser, disclosed in his 1940 book, Hitler and I, that Hitler was a true disbeliever, succinctly stating: "Hitler is an atheist."

According to Kershaw, following the Nazi takeover, race policy and the church struggle were among the most important ideological spheres: "In both areas, the party had no difficulty in mobilizing its activists, whose radicalism in turn forced the government into legislative action. In fact the party leadership often found itself compelled to respond to pressures from below, stirred up by the Gauleiter playing their own game, or emanating sometimes from radical activists at a local level". As time went on, anti-clericalism and anti-church sentiment among grass roots party activists "simply couldn't be eradicated", wrote Kershaw and they could "draw on the verbal violence of party leaders towards the churches for their encouragement." Unlike some other fascist movements of the era, Nazi ideology was essentially hostile to Christianity and clashed with Christian beliefs in multiple respects. The Nazis seized hundreds of monasteries in Germany and Austria and removed clergymen and laymen alike. In other cases, religious journals and newspapers were censored or banned. The Nazi regime attempted to shut down the Catholic press, which declined "from 435 periodicals in 1934 to just seven in 1943." From the beginning in 1935, the Gestapo arrested and jailed over 2720 clerics who were interned at Germany's Dachau concentration camp, leading to over 1,000 deaths. Nazism saw the Christian ideals of meekness and conscience as obstacles to the violent instincts required to defeat other races. From the mid-1930s anti-Christian elements within the Nazi Party became more prominent; however, they were restrained by Hitler because of the negative press their actions were receiving, and by 1934 the Nazi Party pretended a neutral position in regard to the Protestant Churches.

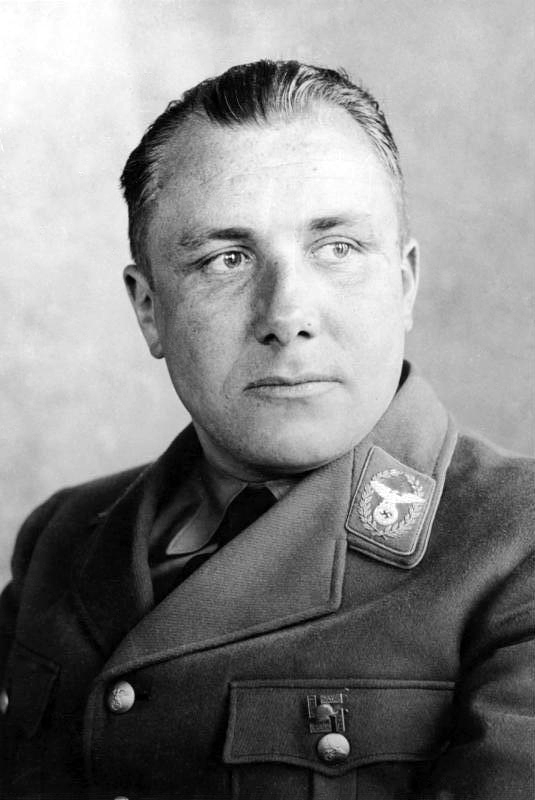
Martin Bormann, Hitler's "deputy" from 1941, also saw Nazism and Christianity as "incompatible" and had a particular loathing for the Semitic origins of Christianity.

Rosenberg held among offices the title of "the Fuehrer's Delegate for the Entire Intellectual and Philosophical Education and Instruction for the National Socialist Party". In his Myth of the Twentieth Century (1930), Rosenberg wrote that the main enemies of the Germans were the "Russian Tartars" and "Semites" – with "Semites" including Christians, especially the Catholic Church: Goebbels was among the most aggressive anti-Church Nazi radicals. Goebbels led the Nazi persecution of the German clergy and, as the war progressed, on the "Church Question", he wrote "after the war it has to be generally solved... There is, namely, an insoluble opposition between the Christian and a heroic-German world view". Martin Bormann became Hitler's private secretary and de facto "deputy" führer from 1941. He was a leading advocate of the Kirchenkampf, a project which Hitler for the most part wished to keep until after the war. Bormann was a rigid guardian of Nazi orthodoxy and saw Christianity and Nazism as "incompatible". He said publicly in 1941 that "National Socialism and Christianity are irreconcilable". In a confidential message to the Gauleiter on 9 June 1941, Bormann had declared that "National Socialism and Christianity are irreconcilable." He also declared that the Churches' influence in the leadership of the people "must absolutely and finally be broken." Bormann believed Nazism was based on a "scientific" world-view, and was completely incompatible with Christianity. Bormann stated:

When we National Socialists speak of belief in God, we do not mean, like the naive Christians and their spiritual exploiters, a man-like being sitting around somewhere in the universe. The force governed by natural law by which all these countless planets move in the universe, we call omnipotence or God. The assertion that this universal force can trouble itself about the destiny of each individual being, every smallest earthly bacillus, can be influenced by so-called prayers or other surprising things, depends upon a requisite dose of naivety or else upon shameless professional self-interest.

== Nazi anti-Semitism ==
Instead of focusing on religious differentiation, Hitler maintained that it was important to promote "an antisemitism of reason", one that acknowledged the racial basis of Jewry.

In his book about the history of Christianity, Geoffrey Blainey wrote that "Christianity could not escape some indirect blame for the terrible Holocaust. The Jews and Christians had been rivals and sometimes enemies for a long period of history. Furthermore, it was traditional for Christians to blame Jewish leaders for the crucifixion of Christ...", but, Blainey noted, "At the same time, Christians showed devotion and respect. They were conscious of their debt to the Jews. Jesus and all the disciples and all the authors of his Gospels were of the Jewish race. Christians viewed the Old Testament, the holy book of the synagogues as equally a holy book for them...".

Laurence Rees noted that "emphasis on Christianity" was absent from the vision expressed by Hitler in Mein Kampf and his "bleak and violent vision" and visceral hatred of the Jews had been influenced by quite different sources: the notion of life as struggle he drew from Social Darwinism, the notion of the superiority of the "Aryan race" he drew from Arthur de Gobineau's The Inequality of the Human Races; and from Rosenberg he took the idea of a link between Judaism and Bolshevism. Hitler espoused a ruthless policy of "negative eugenic selection", believing that world history consisted of a struggle for survival between races, in which the Jews plotted to undermine the Germans, and inferior groups like Slavs and defective individuals in the German gene pool, threatened the Aryan "master race". Richard J. Evans wrote that his views on these subjects have often been called "social Darwinist", but that there is little agreement among historians as to what this term may mean. According to Evans, Hitler "used his own version of the language of social Darwinism as a central element in the discursive practice of extermination...", and the language of Social Darwinism, in its Nazi variant, helped to remove all restraint from the directors of the "terroristic and exterminatory" policies of the regime, by "persuading them that what they were doing was justified by history, science and nature".

== Kirchenkampf (church struggle) ==
As the Nazi Party began its takeover of power in Germany in 1933 the struggling, but still nominally functioning Weimar government, led by its president, Paul von Hindenburg, and represented by his appointed Vice-Chancellor, Franz von Papen, initiated talks with the Holy See concerning the establishment of a concordat. The talks lasted three and half months while Hitler consolidated his hold on power. This attempt achieved the signing of the Reichskonkordat on 20 July 1933, which protected the freedom of the Catholic Church and restricted priests and bishops from political activity.

Like the idea of the Reichskonkordat, the notion of a Protestant Reich Church, which would unify the Protestant Churches, also had been considered previously. Hitler had discussed the matter as early as 1927 with Ludwig Müller, who was at that time the military chaplain of Königsberg.

Christianity remained the dominant religion in Germany through the Nazi period, and its influence over Germans displeased the Nazi hierarchy. Evans wrote that Hitler believed that in the long run Nazism and religion would not be able to coexist, and stressed repeatedly that it was a secular ideology, founded on modern science. According to Evans: "Science, he declared, would easily destroy the last remaining vestiges of superstition." Germany could not tolerate the intervention of foreign influences such as the Pope, and "Priests, he said, were 'black bugs,' abortions in black cassocks.'"

During Hitler's dictatorship, more than 6,000 clergymen, on the charge of treasonable activity, were imprisoned or executed. The same measures were taken in the occupied territories; in French Lorraine, the Nazis forbade religious youth movements, parish meetings, and scout meetings. Church assets were taken, Church schools were closed, and teachers in religious institutes were dismissed. The Episcopal seminary was closed, and the SA and SS desecrated churches and religious statues and pictures. Three hundred clergy were expelled from the Lorraine region; monks and nuns were deported or forced to renounce their vows.

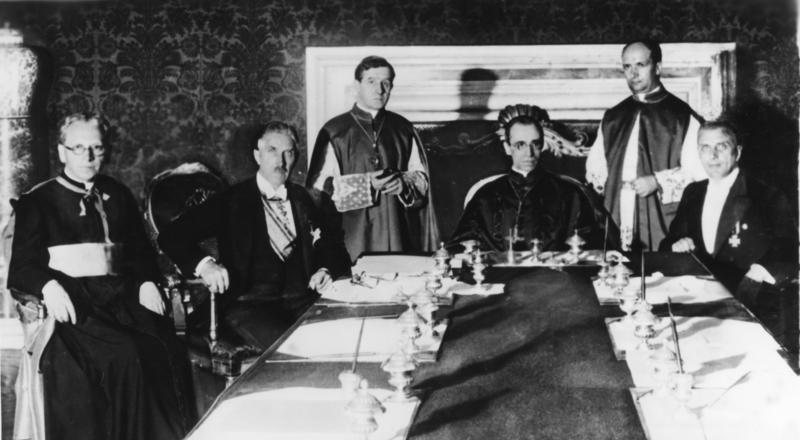
The signing of the Reichskonkordat on 20 July 1933 in Rome. From left to right: German prelate Ludwig Kaas, German Vice-Chancellor Franz von Papen, Secretary of Extraordinary Ecclesiastical Affairs Giuseppe Pizzardo, Cardinal Secretary of State Eugenio Pacelli, Alfredo Ottaviani, and member of Reichsministerium des Inneren (Home Office) Rudolf Buttmann.

The Catholic Church was particularly suppressed in Poland: between 1939 and 1945, an estimated 3,000 members (18%) of the Polish clergy, were murdered; of these, 1,992 died in concentration camps. In the annexed territory of Reichsgau Wartheland it was even more harsh: churches were systematically closed and most priests were either killed, imprisoned, or deported to the General Government. Eighty per cent of the Catholic clergy and five bishops of Warthegau were sent to concentration camps in 1939; 108 of them are regarded as blessed martyrs. Religious persecution was not confined to Poland: in Dachau concentration camp alone, 2,600 Catholic priests from 24 countries were killed.

A number of historians maintain that the Nazis had a general covert plan, which some argue existed before the Nazis' rose to power, to destroy Christianity within the Reich. To what extent a plan to subordinate the churches and limit their role in the country's life existed before the Nazi rise to power, and exactly who among the Nazi leadership supported such a move remains contested. However, other historians assert that no such plan existed. Summarizing a 1945 Office of Strategic Services report, The New York Times columnist Joe Sharkey, stated that the Nazis had a plan to "subvert and destroy German Christianity," which was to be accomplished through control and subversion of the churches and to be completed after the war. However, the report stated this goal was limited to a "sector of the National Socialist party," namely Alfred Rosenberg and Baldur von Schirach. Historian Roger Griffin maintains: "There is no doubt that in the long run Nazi leaders such as Hitler and Himmler intended to eradicate Christianity just as ruthlessly as any other rival ideology, even if in the short term they had to be content to make compromises with it." In his study The Holy Reich, the historian Richard Steigmann-Gall comes to the opposite conclusion, "Totally absent, besides Hitler's vague ranting, is any firm evidence that Hitler or the Nazis were going to 'destroy' or 'eliminate' the churches once the war was over." Regarding his wider thesis that, "leading Nazis in fact considered themselves Christian" or at least understood their movement "within a Christian frame of reference", Steigmann-Gall admits he "argues against the consensus that Nazism as a whole was either unrelated to Christianity or actively opposed to it."

Although there are high-profile cases of individual Lutherans and Catholics who died in prison or in concentration camps, the largest number of Christians who died would have been Jewish Christians or mischlinge who were sent to death camps for their race rather than their religion. Kahane (1999) cites an estimate that there were approximately 200,000 Christians of Jewish descent in Nazi Germany. Among the Gentile Christians 11,300 Jehovah's Witnesses were placed in camps, and about 1,490 died, of whom 270 were executed as conscientious objectors. Dachau had a special "priest block." Of the 2,720 priests (among them 2,579 Catholic) held in Dachau, 1,034 did not survive the camp. The majority of these priests were Polish (1,780), of whom 868 died in Dachau.

== Specific groups ==
=== Catholicism ===
The attitude of the Nazi Party towards the Catholic Church ranged from tolerance to near-total renunciation and outright aggression. Bullock wrote that Hitler had some regard for the organisational power of Catholicism, but he had utter contempt for its central teachings, which he said, if taken to their conclusion, "would mean the systematic cultivation of the human failure". A number of Nazis were anti-clerical in both private and public life. The Nazi Party had decidedly pagan elements. One position is that the Church and fascism could never have a lasting connection because both are a "holistic Weltanschauung" claiming the whole of the person.

Adolf Hitler himself has been described as a "spiritualist" by Laqueur, but he has been described by Bullock as a "rationalist" and a "materialist" with no appreciation for the spiritual side of humanity; and a simple "atheist" by Blainey. His fascist comrade Benito Mussolini was an atheist. Both were anticlerical, but they understood that it would be rash to begin their Kulturkampfs against Catholicism prematurely. Such a clash, though possibly inevitable in the future, was put off while they dealt with other enemies.

The nature of the Nazi Party's relationship with the Catholic Church was also complicated. Vatican daily newspaper L’Osservatore Romano owned by the Holy See condemned Adolf Hitler, Nazism, racism, and anti-Semitism by name, and in 1930 with the approval of Pope Pius XII (then Cardinal Secretary of State Eugenio Pacelli), the paper declared that "belonging to the National Socialist Party of Hitler is irreconcilable with the Catholic conscience." In early 1931, the German bishops issued an edict excommunicating all leaders of the Nazi Party and banning all Catholics from membership. The ban was conditionally modified in 1933 when State law mandated that all trade union workers and civil servants must be members of the Nazi Party. In July 1933 a Concord Reichskonkordat was signed with the Vatican which prevented the Church in Germany from engaging in political activities; however, the Vatican continued to speak out on issues of faith and morals and it opposed Nazi philosophy.

In 1937 Pope Pius XI issued the encyclical Mit brennender Sorge condemning Nazi ideology, notably the Gleichschaltung policy directed against religious influences upon education, as well as Nazi racism and antisemitism. His death prevented the issuing of a planned encyclical Humani generis unitas, but the similar Summi Pontificatus was the first encyclical released by his successor (Pius XII), in October 1939. This encyclical strongly condemned both racism and totalitarianism, without the anti-Judaism present in the draft presented to Pope Pius XI for Humani generis unitas. The massive Catholic opposition to the Nazi euthanasia programs led them to be quieted on 28 August 1941. Catholics, on occasion, actively and openly protested against Nazi antisemitism through several bishops and priests such as Bishop Clemens von Galen of Münster. In Nazi Germany, political dissenters were imprisoned, and some German priests were sent to the concentration camps for their opposition, including the pastor of Berlin's Catholic Cathedral Bernhard Lichtenberg and the seminarian Karl Leisner.

In 1941 the Nazi authorities decreed the dissolution of all monasteries and abbeys in the German Reich, a number of them effectively being occupied and secularized by the Allgemeine SS under Himmler. However, on 30 July 1941 the Aktion Klostersturm (Operation Monastery Storm) was put to an end by a decree from Hitler, who feared that the increasing protests by the Catholic segment of the German population might result in passive rebellions and thereby harm the Nazi war effort on the eastern front. In a report from 20 August, 1942, Gestapo stated that Catholics demonstrated passive resistance to Nazism, which included participation in the mass, religious devotions and pilgrimages, despite the restrictions and discouragement.

==== Plans for the Roman Catholic Church ====
Historian Heinz Hürten (professor emeritus at the Catholic University of Eichstaett) noted that the Nazi Party had plans for the Roman Catholic Church, according to which the Church was supposed to "eat from the hands of the government." Hürten states the sequence of these plans: an abolition of the priestly celibacy and a nationalisation of all Church property, the dissolution of monastic religious institutes, and an end to the influence of the Catholic Church upon education. Hürten states that Hitler proposed to reduce vocations to the priesthood by forbidding seminaries from receiving applicants before their 25th birthdays, and thus he had hoped that these men would marry beforehand, during the time (18–25 years) in which they were obliged to work in military or labour service. Also, along with this process, the Church's sacraments would be revised and changed to so-called "Lebensfeiern", the non-Christian celebrations of different periods of life.

There existed some considerable differences among officials within the Nazi Party on the question of Christianity. Goebbels is purported to have feared the creation of a third front of Catholics against their regime in Germany itself. In his diary, Goebbels wrote about the "traitors of the Black International who again stabbed our glorious government in the back by their criticism", by which Hürten states he meant the indirectly or actively resisting Catholic clergymen (who wore black cassocks). Martin Bormann called for the disestablishment of the Catholic Church in Germany, arguing that it stands "in concealed or open opposition to National Socialism". Similar views were expressed for Reinhard Heydrich, who considered the dissolution of Catholic structures in Germany a matter of national security, citing "the hostility constantly displayed by the Vatican, the negative attitude of the bishops towards the Anschluss as typified by the conduct of Bishop Sproll of Württemberg, the attempt to make the Catholic Eucharistic Congress in Budapest a demonstration of united opposition to Germany, and the continued accusations of Godlessness and of destruction of church life made by Church leaders in their pastoral letters."

=== Protestantism ===
According to Peter Stachura, the backbone of Nazi electoral support was rural and small-town Protestant middle class, whereas German Catholics rejected the party and overwhelmingly voted for the confessional Catholic Centre Party and Bavarian People's Party instead. Both Protestant clergy and laymen were generally supportive of National Socialism, with Paul Althaus writing that "our Protestant churches have greeted the turning point of 1933 as a gift and miracle from God". According to Robert Ericksen, sermons in Protestant churches were full of praise for the new regime, with a Protestant church in Bavaria announcing that the Nazi party "may expect not just the applause but the joyous cooperation of the church." Lutherans were particularly supportive of the Nazi regime, with a Lutheran diocesan magazine Allgemeine Evangelisch-Lutherische Kirchenzeitung welcoming the rise of Hitler as a "great thing [that] God has done for our Volk" in April 1933. Ericksen also notes that the "most thoroughly Protestant regions of Germany gave the Nazi Party its strongest support". Protestants were overrepresented within the Nazi Party, and according to Jürgen W. Falter, 83% of recruits to the NSDAP between 1925 and 1932 were Protestant. Falter observes that the Nazi Party found it challenging to build up any support amongst Catholics, and fared considerably worse in terms of both electoral support and new recruits in Catholic areas.

Richard Steigmann-Gall remarks that "scholarship since the 1980s has quite clearly demonstrated that nominal Protestant confessional membership was a better indicator of who voted for the National Socialist Party (NSDAP) than any other single category like class, region, geography or gender." Analysing the results of the July 1932 German federal election, Steigmann-Gall concludes that religious piety among German Protestants, rather than apostasy, was the defining factor in regards to supporting National Socialism, with most religious Protestants being most likely to vote for NSDAP. He also observes a stark contrast between Catholic and Protestant voters in mixed areas; regarding Baden, Steigmann-Gall observes that "in contrast to the Catholic south, which saw near total opposition to the Nazis, the Protestant north saw a clear ascendancy of the Nazi party", while "in Bonn, the Protestant Mittelstand made up the bulk of the party's success, while the Catholic population almost entirely stayed away". Steigmann-Gall concludes that "Nazi party's share of a region's vote was inversely proportional to the Catholic percentage of its population".

According to Ericksen, the reason for Protestant support for Nationalism Socialism was the reactionary and nationalist nature of Political Protestantism, noting that "the German Protestant church was a place where hyper-nationalism, overt militarism, and hostility toward modern culture were in full flower". Despite the generally supportive attitude towards National Socialism amongst German Protestants, there was also resistance. Some Protestant theologians such as Dietrich Bonhoeffer were outspoken opponents of the new regime since the beginning, while others such as Martin Niemöller came to oppose the NSDAP once the extremist nature of its rule manifested itself. Richard Steigmann-Gall believes that the apparent swing towards the right of German Protestants can be attributed to the nationalist and reactionary character that the Protestant churches have assumed in the imperial and Kulturkampf era. It was believed that "the true German is a Protestant", and as such, "the narrative of national identity in Germany was written in a distinctly Protestant language". Protestant theology focused on German nationalism and showed Germany as a nation favoured by God itself, which Steigmann-Gall calls "war theology". The first known instance of the Dolchstoßlegende came from a Protestant court chaplain Bruno Doehring, and following the end of World War I, the political and social influence that the Protestant churches have amassed was used to attack the Weimar Republic, portraying it as a "metaphor for cultural and social degeneracy".

==== Martin Luther ====
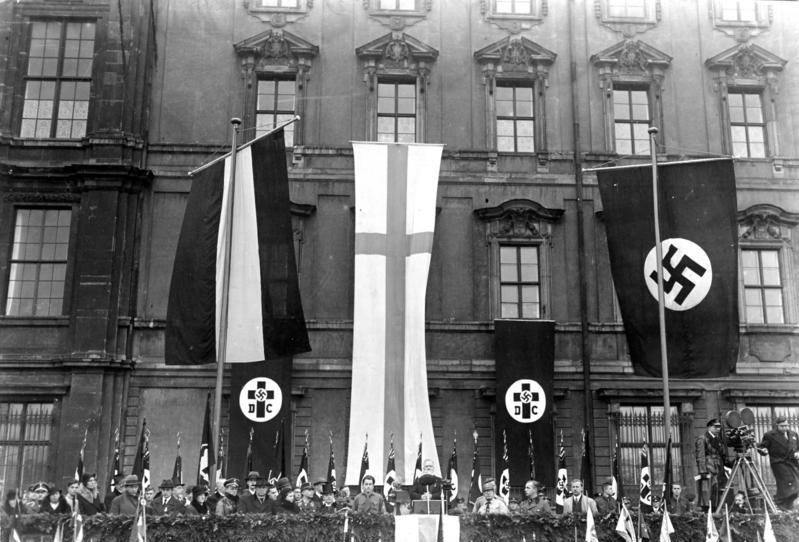
19. November 1933: Luthertag (Luther Day) celebrations of the German Evangelical Church in front of the Berlin Palace. Joachim Hossenfelder is speaking.

During the First and Second World Wars, German Protestant leaders used the writings of Luther to support the cause of German nationalism. On the 450th anniversary of Luther's birth, which fell only a few months after the Nazi Party began its seizure of power in 1933, celebrations were conducted on a large scale by both the Protestant Churches and the Nazi Party. At a celebration in Königsberg, Erich Koch, at that time the Gauleiter of East Prussia, made a speech in which he, among other things, compared Adolf Hitler to Martin Luther and claimed that the Nazis fought with Luther's spirit. Such a speech might be dismissed as mere propaganda, but, as Steigmann-Gall points out: "Contemporaries regarded Koch as a bona fide Christian who had attained his position [as the elected president of a provincial Church synod through a genuine commitment to Protestantism and its institutions." Even so, Steigmann-Gall states that the Nazis were not a Christian movement.

The prominent Protestant theologian Karl Barth, of the Swiss Reformed Church, opposed this appropriation of Luther in both the German Empire and Nazi Germany, when he stated in 1939 that the writings of Martin Luther were used by the Nazis to glorify both the State and state absolutism: "The German people suffer under his error of the relationship between the law and the Bible, between secular and spiritual power", in which Luther divided the temporal State from the inward state, focusing instead on spiritual matters, thus limiting the ability of the individual or the church to question the actions of the State, which was seen as a God ordained instrument.

In February 1940, Barth specifically accused German Lutherans of separating biblical teachings from the teachings of the State and thus legitimizing the Nazi state ideology. He was not alone with his view. A few years earlier on 5 October 1933, Pastor Wilhelm Rehm from Reutlingen declared publicly that "Hitler would not have been possible without Martin Luther", though others have also made this same statement about other influences on Hitler's rise to power. Anti-communist historian Paul Johnson has said that "without Lenin, Hitler would not have been possible".

==== Protestant groups ====
Flag of the German Christians, a movement seeking a universal German Protestant realignment under the ideology of Nazism

Different German states possessed regional social variations as to class densities and religious denomination. Richard Steigmann-Gall alleges a linkage between several Protestant churches and Nazism. The German Christians (Deutsche Christen) were a movement within the Protestant Church of Germany with the aim of changing traditional Christian teachings to align with the ideology of Nazism and its anti-Jewish policies. The Deutsche Christen factions were united in the goal of establishing a Nazi Protestantism and abolishing what they considered to be Jewish traditions in Christianity, and some but not all rejected the Old Testament and the teaching of the Apostle Paul. In November 1933, a Protestant mass rally of the Deutsche Christen, which brought together a record 20,000 people, passed three resolutions:

- Adolf Hitler is the completion of the Reformation,
- Baptized Jews are to be dismissed from the Church
- The Old Testament is to be excluded from Sacred Scriptures.

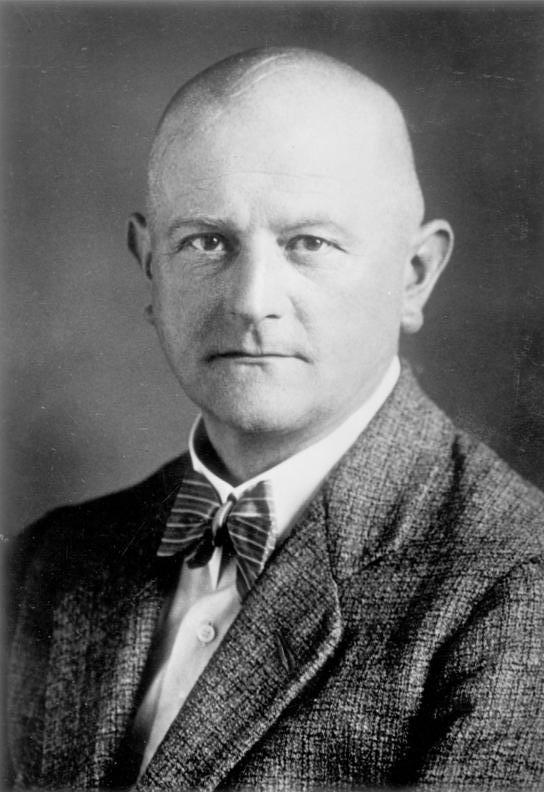
Ludwig Müller was a main proponent of implementing Nazi elements into German Protestantism, which caused major disruptions in the German Evangelical Church and eventually led to the creation of the Confessing Church by some alarmed pastors such as Martin Niemöller.

The German Christians selected Ludwig Müller (1883–1945) as their candidate for Reich Bishop in 1933. In response to Hitler's campaigning, two-thirds of those Protestants who voted elected Lutheran minister Ludwig Müller to govern the Protestant Churches. Müller was convinced that he had a divine responsibility to promote Hitler and his ideals, and together with Hitler, he favoured a unified Reichskirche of Protestants and Catholics. This Reichskirche was to be a loose federation in the form of a council, but it would be subordinated to the Nazi regime.

The level of ties between Nazism and the Protestant churches has been a contentious issue for decades. One difficulty is that Protestantism includes a number of religious bodies and a number of them had little relation to each other. Added to that, Protestantism tends to allow more variation among individual congregations than Catholicism or Eastern Orthodox Christianity, which makes statements about the official positions of denominations problematic. The German Christians were a minority within the Protestant population, numbering one fourth to one third of the 40 million Protestants in Germany. With Bishop Müller's efforts and Hitler's support, the German Evangelical Church was formed and recognized by the state as a legal entity on 14 July 1933, with the aim of melding the State, the people and the Church into one body. Dissenters were silenced by expulsion or violence.

The support of the German Christian movement within the churches was opposed by multiple adherents of traditional Christian teachings. Other groups within the Protestant church included members of the Bekennende Kirche, Confessing Church, which included such prominent members as Martin Niemöller and Dietrich Bonhoeffer; both rejected the Nazi efforts to meld volkisch principles with traditional Lutheran doctrine. Martin Niemöller organized the Pfarrernotbund (Pastors' Emergency League) which was supported by nearly 40 percent of the Evangelical pastors. They were, however, (as of 1932) a minority within the Protestant church bodies in Germany. But in 1933, a number of Deutsche Christen left the movement after a November speech by Reinhold Krause urged, among other things, the rejection of the Old Testament as Jewish superstition. So when Ludwig Müller could not deliver on conforming all Christians to Nazism, and after some of the German Christian rallies and more radical ideas generated a backlash, Hitler's condescending attitudes towards Protestants increased and he lost all interest in Protestant church affairs.

The resistance within the churches to Nazi ideology was the longest lasting and most bitter of any German institution. The Nazis weakened the churches' resistance from within, but had not yet succeeded in taking full control of the churches, which was evidenced by the thousands of clergy who were sent to concentration camps. Rev. Martin Niemöller was imprisoned in 1937, charged with "misuse of the pulpit to vilify the State and the Party and attack the authority of the Government." After a failed assassination on Hitler's life in 1943 by members of the military and members of the German Resistance movement, to which Dietrich Bonhoeffer and others in the Confessing Church movement belonged, Hitler ordered the arrest of Protestant, mainly Lutheran clergy. However, even the "Confessing Church made frequent declarations of loyalty to Hitler". Later, a number of Protestants were solidly opposed to Nazism after the nature of the movement was better understood. However, a number also maintained until the end of the war the view that Nazism was compatible with the teachings of the church.

The small Methodist population was deemed foreign at times; this stemmed from the fact that Methodism began in England, and did not develop in Germany until the nineteenth century under the leadership of Christoph Gottlob Müller and Louis Jacoby. Because of this history they felt the urge to be "more German than the Germans" in order to avoid coming under suspicion. Methodist Bishop John L. Nelsen toured the U.S. on Hitler's behalf in order to protect his church, but in private letters he indicated that he feared and hated Nazism, and he eventually retired and fled to Switzerland. Methodist Bishop F. H. Otto Melle took a far more collaborationist position that included his apparently sincere support for Nazism. He was also committed to an asylum near the war's end. To show his gratitude to the latter bishop, Hitler made a gift of 10,000 marks in 1939 to a Methodist congregation so it could pay for the purchase of an organ. The money was never used. Outside Germany, Melle's views were overwhelmingly rejected by most Methodists.

The leader of the pro-Nazi segment of the Baptists was Paul Schmidt. The idea of a "national church" was possible in the history of mainstream German Protestantism, but generally forbidden among the Anabaptists, the Jehovah's Witnesses, and the Catholic Church. The forms or offshoots of Protestantism that advocated pacifism, anti-nationalism, or racial equality tended to oppose the Nazi state in the strongest possible terms. Other Christian groups known for their efforts against Nazism include the Jehovah's Witnesses.

==== Jehovah's Witnesses ====
In 1934, the Watch Tower Bible and Tract Society published a letter entitled "Declaration of Facts". In this personal letter to then Reich Chancellor Hitler, J. F. Rutherford stated that "the Bible Researchers of Germany are fighting for the very same high ethical goals and ideals which also the national government of the German Reich proclaimed respecting the relationship of humans to God, namely: honesty of the created being towards its creator". However, while the Jehovah's Witnesses sought to reassure the Nazi government that their goals were purely religious and non-political and they expressed the hope that the government would allow them to continue their preaching, Hitler still restricted their work in Nazi Germany. After this, Rutherford began denouncing Hitler in articles through his publications, potentially making the plight of Jehovah's Witnesses in Nazi Germany worse.

Jehovah's Witnesses or "Bible Researchers" (Bibelforschers) as they were known in Germany, comprised 25,000 members and they were among those persecuted by the Nazi government. All incarcerated members were identified by a unique purple triangle. Some members of the religious group refused to serve in the German military or give allegiance to the Nazi government, for which 250 were executed. An estimated 10,000 were arrested for various crimes, and 2,000 were sent to Nazi concentration camps, where approximately 1,200 were killed. Unlike Jews and Romani, who were persecuted on the basis of their ethnicity, Jehovah's Witnesses could escape persecution and personal harm by renouncing their religious beliefs by signing a document indicating renunciation of their faith, submission to state authority, and support of the German military.

==== Anabaptists ====
There is an ongoing debate about the level of complicity Anabaptist communities had in the Nazi regime. Despite a historic pacifist stance, a number of Mennonite leaders and congregations embraced the rise of the Nazi Party. When the Reich persecuted the Rhön Bruderhof and the Gestapo forcefully disbanded it in 1937, Michael Horsch, brother of American Mennonite author John Horsch and leader of the Federation of Mennonite Churches of South Germany, publicly disavowed and discredited the community. Horsch defended the government's actions and claimed the disbandment of the community was not persecution, but rather the result of internal mismanagement. Mennonite publications defended the German government's persecution of other sects, such as Jehovah's Witnesses, thus ensuring there was no association between those persecuted and Mennonites. In Prussia, Mennonite leaders were highly outspoken in favor of the 1939 invasion of Poland, which some viewed as a war of liberation that would result in a fusion of Germany with Christendom.

=== Atheists ===
Reichsführer-SS Heinrich Himmler agitated against atheists: "Any human being who does not believe in God should be considered arrogant, megalomaniacal, and stupid."

On 13 October 1933, Deputy Führer Rudolf Hess issued a decree stating: "No National Socialist may suffer any detriment on the ground that he does not profess any particular faith or confession or on the ground that he does not make any religious profession at all." However, the regime strongly opposed "Godless Communism" and all of Germany's freethinking (freigeist), atheist, and largely left-wing organizations were banned the same year.

In a speech made during the negotiations for the Nazi-Vatican Concordant of 1933, Hitler argued against secular schools, stating: "Secular schools can never be tolerated because such schools have no religious instruction, and a general moral instruction without a religious foundation is built on air; consequently, all character training and religion must be derived from faith." One of the groups closed down by the Nazi regime was the German Freethinkers League. Christians appealed to Hitler to end anti-religious and anti-Church propaganda promulgated by Free Thinkers, and within Hitler's Nazi Party, the atheist Martin Bormann was quite vocal in his anti-Christian views. Heinrich Himmler, who himself was fascinated with Germanic paganism, was a strong promoter of the gottgläubig movement and he did not allow atheists into the SS, arguing that their "refusal to acknowledge higher powers" would be a "potential source of indiscipline". In the SS, Himmler announced: "We believe in a God Almighty who stands above us; he has created the earth, the Fatherland, and the Volk, and he has sent us the Führer. Any human being who does not believe in God should be considered arrogant, megalomaniacal, and stupid and thus not suited for the SS." He also declared: "As National Socialists, we believe in a Godly worldview."

=== Baháʼís ===
The Baháʼí Faith was first established in Germany in 1905, when a small group of Baháʼís immigrated from the United States, bringing the teachings of the Faith with them. Following World War I, the Baháʼí community in Germany experienced steady growth, becoming increasingly active and visible. This was marked by the founding of a publishing house dedicated to Baháʼí literature and the organization of national conferences. As the community expanded, Local Spiritual Assemblies were formed in many German cities and towns.

However, this progress began to falter as early as 1936. That year, Baháʼí-owned businesses in Stuttgart were vandalized, and their owners threatened—a reflection of the Nazi regime’s growing antisemitism, as many of the new German Baháʼís had Jewish heritage. In 1937, Heinrich Himmler, Reichsführer of the SS and a key architect of the Holocaust, issued an official decree banning the Baháʼí Faith and all its institutions. The reason given was the Faith’s “international and pacifist tendencies,” which the regime viewed as subversive.

This decree triggered a wave of persecution. Nazi authorities demolished several Baháʼí memorials, seized or destroyed archives and personal religious texts, and by 1939, began arresting members of the National Spiritual Assembly — the Baháʼí Faith’s elected national governing body in Germany.

Further mass arrests took place in 1942, with some Baháʼís deported to concentration camps where they later perished. In 1944, imprisoned Baháʼí leaders were put on trial in Darmstadt. Despite a strong defense, the trial appeared to be a formality—the outcome already determined. All the defendants were found guilty, fined heavily, and ordered to cease all Baháʼí activities and associations.

Baháʼís in other parts of Europe suffered similar repression, including in Hungary and Poland. Among them was Lidia Zamenhof, daughter of L. L. Zamenhof, the creator of Esperanto, who was also arrested and ultimately perished under Nazi persecution.

=== Esoteric groups ===
In the 1930s there already existed an esoteric scene in Germany and Austria. The organisations within this spectrum were suppressed, but, unlike Freemasonry in Nazi Germany, they were not persecuted. The only known case in which an occultist might have been sent to a concentration camp for his beliefs is that of Friedrich Bernhard Marby.

Also, some Nazi leaders had an interest in esotericism. Rudolf Hess had an interest in anthroposophy. Heinrich Himmler showed a strong interest in esoteric matters.

The esoteric Thule Society lent support to the German Workers' Party, which was eventually transformed into the Nazi Party in 1920. Dietrich Eckart, a remote associate of the Thule Society, actually coached Hitler on his public speaking skills, and while Hitler has not been shown to have been a member of Thule, he received support from the group. Hitler later dedicated the second volume of Mein Kampf to Eckart. The racist-occult doctrines of Ariosophy contributed to the atmosphere of the völkisch movement in the Weimar Republic that eventually led to the rise of Nazism.

=== Other beliefs ===
In the Appendix of The Nazi Persecution of the Churches, Conway has included a document: "List of sects prohibited by the Gestapo up to December 1938." It mentions the "International Jehovah's Witness" under No.1, but also includes a so-called "Study group for Psychic Research"

The small pagan "German Faith Movement", which worshipped the sun and the seasons, supported the Nazis.

== Churches and the war effort ==
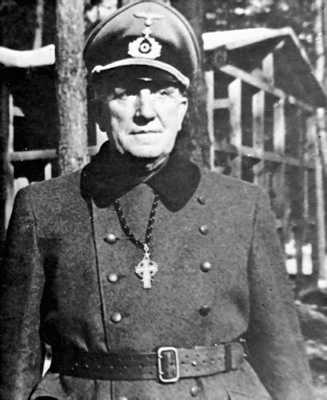
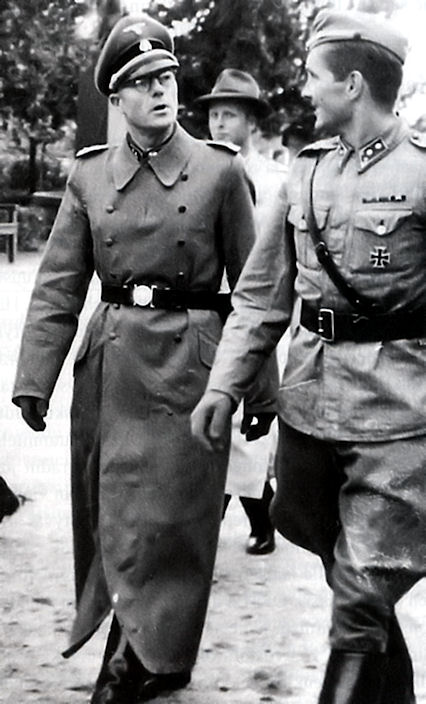
Waffen SS Chaplains: Obersturmbannführer Jean de Mayol de Lupé and Obersturmbannführer Kalervo Kurkiala (right)

Hitler called a truce to the Church conflict with the outbreak of war, wanting to back away from policies which were likely to cause internal friction inside Germany. He decreed at the outset of war that "no further action should be taken against the Evangelical and Catholic Churches for the duration of the war". According to John Conway, "The Nazis had to reckon with the fact that, despite all of Rosenberg's efforts, only 5 percent of the population registered themselves at the 1930 census as no longer connected with Christian Churches." The support of millions of German Christians was needed in order for Hitler's plans to come to fruition. It was Hitler's belief that if religion is a help, "it can only be an advantage". Most of the 3 million Nazi Party members "still paid the Church taxes" and considered themselves Christians. Regardless, a number of Nazi radicals in the party hierarchy determined that the Church Struggle should be continued. Following the Nazi victory in Poland, the repression of the Churches was extended, despite their early protestations of loyalty to the cause.

The Ministry of Propaganda issued threats and applied intense pressure on the Churches to voice support for the war, and the Gestapo banned Church meetings for a few weeks. In the first few months of the war, the German Churches complied. No denunciations of the invasion of Poland, or the Blitzkrieg were issued. On the contrary, Bishop Marahrens gave thanks to God that the Polish conflict was over, and "that He has granted our armies a quick victory." The Ministry for Church Affairs suggested that Church bells across Germany ring for a week in celebration, and that pastors and priests "flocked to volunteer as chaplains" for the German forces. The Catholic bishops asked their followers to support the war effort: "We appeal to the faithful to join in ardent prayer that God's providence may lead this war to blessed success for Fatherland and people." Likewise, the Evangelicals proclaimed: "We unite in this hour with our people in intercession for our Fuhrer and Reich, for all the armed forces, and for all who do their duty for the fatherland."

Even in the face of evidence of Nazi atrocities against Catholic priests and lay people in Poland, which were broadcast on Vatican Radio, German Catholic religious leaders continued to express their support for the Nazi war effort. They urged their Catholic followers to "fulfill their duty to the Fuhrer". Nazi war actions in 1940 and 1941 similarly prompted the Church to voice its support. The bishops declared that the Church "assents to the just war, especially one designed for the safeguarding of the state and the people" and wants a "peace beneficial to Germany and Europe" and calls the faithful to "fulfill their civil and military virtues." But the Nazis strongly disapproved of the sentiments against war expressed by the Pope through his first encyclical, Summi Pontificatus and his 1939 Christmas message, and they were angered by his support for Poland and the "provocative" use of Vatican Radio by Cardinal Hlond of Poland. Distribution of the encyclical was banned.

Conway wrote that anti-church radical Reinhard Heydrich estimated in a report to Hitler dated October 1939, that the majority of Church people were supporting the war effort – although a few "well known agitators among the pastors needed to be dealt with". Heydrich determined that support from church leaders could not be expected because of the nature of their doctrines and their internationalism, so he devised measures to restrict the operation of the Churches under cover of war time exigencies, such as reducing the resources available to Church presses on the basis of rationing, and prohibiting pilgrimages and large church gatherings on the basis of transportation difficulties. Churches were closed for being "too far from bomb shelters". Bells were melted down. Presses were closed.

With the expansion of the war in the east from 1941, there also came an expansion of the regime's attack on the churches. Monasteries and convents were targeted and expropriations of Church properties surged. The Nazi authorities claimed that the properties were needed for wartime necessities such as hospitals, or accommodations for refugees or children, but they instead used them for their own purposes. "Hostility to the state" was another common cause given for the confiscations, and the actions of a single member of a monastery could result in the seizure of the whole. The Jesuits were especially targeted. The Papal Nuncio Cesare Orsenigo and Cardinal Bertram complained constantly to the authorities but they were told to expect more requisitions owing to war-time needs.

== Religious aspects of Nazism ==
Several elements of Nazism were quasi-religious in nature. The cult of Hitler as the Führer, the "huge congregations, banners, sacred flames, processions, a style of popular and radical preaching, prayers-and-responses, memorials and funeral marches" have all been described by historians of esotericism such as Nicholas Goodrick-Clarke as "essential props for the cult of race and nation, the mission of Aryan Germany and her victory over her enemies." These different religious aspects of Nazism have led some scholars to consider Nazism, like communism, to be a kind of political religion.

Hitler's plan, for example, to erect a magnificent new capital in Berlin (Welthauptstadt Germania), has been described as his attempt to build a version of the New Jerusalem. Since Fritz Stern's classical study The Politics of Cultural Despair, most historians have viewed the relationship between Nazism and religion in this way. Some historians see the Nazi movement and Adolf Hitler as fundamentally hostile to Christianity, though not irreligious. In the first chapter of The Nazi Persecution of the Churches, historian John S. Conway elaborates that Christian Churches had lost their appeal in Germany during the era of the Weimar Republic, and Hitler responded to it by offering "what appeared to be a vital secular faith in place of the discredited creeds of Christianity."

== Relationship between religion and fascism ==
Stanley Payne, a scholar of fascism, notes that fundamental to fascism was the foundation of a purely materialistic "civic religion" that would "displace preceding structures of belief and relegate supernatural religion to a secondary role, or relegate it to none at all", and "though there were specific examples of religious or would-be 'Christian fascists,' fascism presupposed a post-Christian, post-religious, secular, and immanent frame of reference." One theory is that religion and fascism could never have a lasting connection because both are a "holistic Weltanschauung" claiming the whole of the person. Along these lines, Yale political scientist Juan Linz and others have noted that secularization had created a void which could be filled by another total ideology, making secular totalitarianism possible, and Roger Griffin has characterized fascism as a type of anti-religious political religion.

However, Robert Paxton finds that "Fascists often cursed ... materialist secularism" and he adds that the circumstances of past fascisms do not mean that future fascisms can not "build upon a religion in place of a nation, or serve as the expression of national identity. Even in Europe, religion-based fascisms were not unknown: the Falange Española, the Belgian Rexism, the Finnish Lapua Movement, and the Romanian Legion of the Archangel Michael are all good examples". Separately, Richard L. Rubenstein maintains that the religious dimensions of the Holocaust and Nazi fascism were decidedly unique. A sample of Holocaust perpetrators found that 54% belonged to Protestant families.

=== Messianic aspects of Nazism ===
A substantial body of scholarly literature has examined the potential religious dimensions of Nazism and Adolf Hitler’s ideological worldview. Historian Wilfried Daim argued that elements within the Nazi leadership envisioned a postwar transformation of Germany’s religious landscape, potentially replacing traditional Christianity with a new ideological belief system centered on Adolf Hitler. In Der Mann, der Hitler die Ideen gab (1994), Daim reproduced what he described as a document referring to the “unconditional abolishment of all religious commitments (Religionsbekenntnisse) after the final victory (Endsieg)” and the simultaneous proclamation of Hitler as a new messianic figure.

The alleged session report cited by Daim reportedly originated from a private collection, and its provenance and authority remain matters of scholarly discussion. More broadly, historians such as Nicholas Goodrick-Clarke have explored the relationship between völkisch ideology, occult influences, and certain strands of Nazi thought, while emphasizing the complexity and diversity of religious attitudes within the Nazi movement.

Scholars generally caution that interpretations of Nazism as a fully developed alternative religion or as a coherent plan to formally replace Christianity remain debated within the historiography.

=== Thuringian German Christian Prayer for Hitler ===
Schütze, Herr, mit starker Hand
unser Volk und Vaterland!
Laß' auf unsres Führers Pfade
leuchten Deine Huld und Gnade!
Weck' in unserem Herz aufs neue
deutscher Ahnen Kraft und Treue!
Und so laß' uns stark und rein
Deine deutschen Kinder sein!

This translates roughly as:

Protect, O Lord, with strength of hand,
Our people and our fatherland!
Allow upon our leader's course
To shine your mercy and your grace!
Awaken in our hearts anew
Our German bloodline, loyalty, and strength!
And so allow us, strong and pure,
To be your German youth!

== See also ==
- Antisemitism in Christianity
- Antisemitism in Europe
- Antisemitism in 21st-century Germany
- Catholic Church and Nazi Germany
- Catholic resistance to Nazi Germany
- Christmas in Nazi Germany
- Christian Identity
- Christian nationalism
- Christofascism
- Clerical fascism
- Confessing Church
- Criticism of Christianity
- Savitri Devi
- Esoteric Nazism
- Ethnic nationalism
- Far-right politics#Völkisch and revolutionary right
- Far-right politics in Germany (1945–present)
- Far-right subcultures
- Fascism and ideology
- The Holocaust in Germany
- Kinism
- Nazi eugenics
- Nazi racial theories
- Occultism in Nazism
- Persecution of Jehovah's Witnesses in Nazi Germany
- Racial antisemitism
- Racial nationalism
- Racial policy of Nazi Germany
- Racism in Germany
- Relations between Nazi Germany and the Arab world
- Religion and politics
- Religion in Germany
- Religious antisemitism
- Religious nationalism
- White nationalism#Germany
- White supremacy#Germany

== Notes and references ==
=== Bibliography ===
- Bucher, Rainer (2011), Hitler's Theology: A Study in Political Religion, translated by Pohl, Rebecca, London: Continuum, ISBN 978-1-4725-4906-8
- Conway, John S. (1968), The Nazi Persecution of the Churches 1933–45, London: Weidenfeld & Nicolson
- Ericksen, Robert P.; Heschel, Susannah (1999). Betrayal: German Churches and the Holocaust. Minneapolis: Augsberg Fortress. ISBN 978-0-8006-2931-1.
- Evans, Richard J. (2005). The Third Reich in Power. New York: Penguin. ISBN 978-0-14-303790-3.
- Goodrick-Clarke, Nicholas (1985). The Occult Roots of Nazism: Secret Aryan Cults and Their Influence on Nazi Ideology (1992 ed.). New York University Press. ISBN 978-0-8147-3060-7.
- Sven Granzow, Bettina Müller-Sidibé, Andrea Simml 2006: Gottvertrauen und Führerglaube, in: Götz Aly (ed.): Volkes Stimme. Skepsis und Führervertrauen im Nationalsozialismus, Fischer TB (in German), pp. 38–58
- Hastings, Derek (2010), Catholicism and the Roots of Nazism: Religious Identity and National Socialism, New York: Oxford University Press, ISBN 978-0-19-539024-7
- Koehne, Samuel (2014). "Were the National Socialists a Völkisch Party? Paganism, Christianity, and the Nazi Christmas". Central European History. 47 (4): 760–790. doi:10.1017/S0008938914001897. hdl:11343/51140. ISSN 0008-9389. S2CID 146472475.
- Kolnai, Aurel The War Against the West, New York, 1938: Viking Press
- Kurlander, Eric (2017). Hitler's Monsters: A Supernatural History of the Third Reich. Yale University Press. ISBN 978-0-300-19037-3.
- Kurlander, Eric (2019), "Nazism and Religion", Oxford Research Encyclopedia of Religion, Oxford University Press, doi:10.1093/acrefore/9780199340378.013.680, ISBN 978-0-19-934037-8
- Nilsson, Mikael (2024). Christianity in Hitler's Ideology: The Role of Jesus in National Socialism. Cambridge: Cambridge University Press. doi:10.1017/9781009314961. ISBN 978-1-009-31495-4.
- Steigmann-Gall, Richard (2003). The Holy Reich: Nazi Conceptions of Christianity, 1919–1945. Cambridge University Press. ISBN 978-0-521-82371-5.
- Tomberg, Friedrich (2012), Das Christentum in Hitlers Weltanschauung, München: Wilhelm Fink
