= Gottgläubig =

Non-denominationalism in Nazi Germany

In Nazi Germany, gottgläubig (German: [ˈɡɔtˌɡlɔʏbɪç] or [ˈɡɔtˌɡlɔʏbɪk], lit. 'believing in God') was a Nazi religious term for a form of non-denominationalism and deism or theism practised by German citizens who had officially left Christian churches but professed faith in some higher power or divine creator. Such people were called Gottgläubige ("believers in God"), and the term for the overall movement was Gottgläubigkeit ("belief in God"); the term denotes someone who still believes in a god, although without having any institutional religious affiliation. These Nazis were not favourable towards religious institutions of their time, nor did they tolerate atheism of any type within their ranks. The 1943 Philosophical Dictionary defined gottgläubig as: "official designation for those who profess a kind of piety and morality appropriate to the German species, without being bound to a church denomination, whilst however also rejecting irreligion and godlessness." The Gottgläubigkeit was a form of deism, and was "predominantly based on creationist and deistic views". In the 1939 census, 3.5% of the German population identified as gottgläubig.

== Origins ==
In the 1920 programme of the Nazi Party (NSDAP), Adolf Hitler first mentioned the phrase "Positive Christianity". The Nazi Party did not wish to tie itself to a particular Christian denomination but with Christianity in general, and sought freedom of religion for all denominations "so long as they do not endanger its existence or oppose the moral senses of the Germanic race." (point 24).

When Hitler and the NSDAP got into power in 1933, they sought to assert state control over the churches, on the one hand through the Reichskonkordat with the Roman Catholic Church, and the forced merger of the German Evangelical Church Confederation into the Protestant Reich Church on the other. This policy seems to have gone relatively well until late 1936, when a "gradual worsening of relations" between the Nazi Party and the churches saw the rise of Kirchenaustritt ("leaving the Church"). Although there was no top-down official directive to revoke church membership, some Nazi Party members started doing so voluntarily and put other members under pressure to follow their example. Those who left the churches were designated as Gottgläubige ("believers in God"), a term officially recognised by the Interior Minister Wilhelm Frick on 26 November 1936. He stressed that the term signified political disassociation from the churches, not an act of religious apostasy. The term "dissident", which some church leavers had used up until then, was associated with being "without belief" (glaubenslos), whilst most of them emphasized that they still believed in a God, and thus required a different word.

The Nazi Party ideologue Alfred Rosenberg was the first to leave his church on 15 November 1933. In early 1936, SS leaders Heinrich Himmler and Reinhard Heydrich terminated their membership of the Roman Catholic Church, followed by a number of Gauleiter including Martin Mutschmann (Saxony), Carl Röver (Weser-Ems), and Robert Heinrich Wagner (Baden). In late 1936, Roman Catholic party members especially left the church, followed in 1937 by a flood of primarily Protestant party members. The religious status of Adolf Hitler is a matter of debate among historians; Joel Krieger claims that Hitler had abandoned the Catholic Church, and Hitler's private secretary Traudl Junge reported that Hitler was not a member of any church; this was also confirmed by another of Hitler's secretaries, Christa Schroeder. According to some historians such as Michael Phayer and Klaus Scholder, Hitler was excommunicated from the church. However, the shifting actual religious views of Adolf Hitler remain unclear due to conflicting accounts from Hitler's associates such as Otto Strasser, Martin Bormann, Joseph Goebbels, and others.

== Deconfessionalisation policy ==
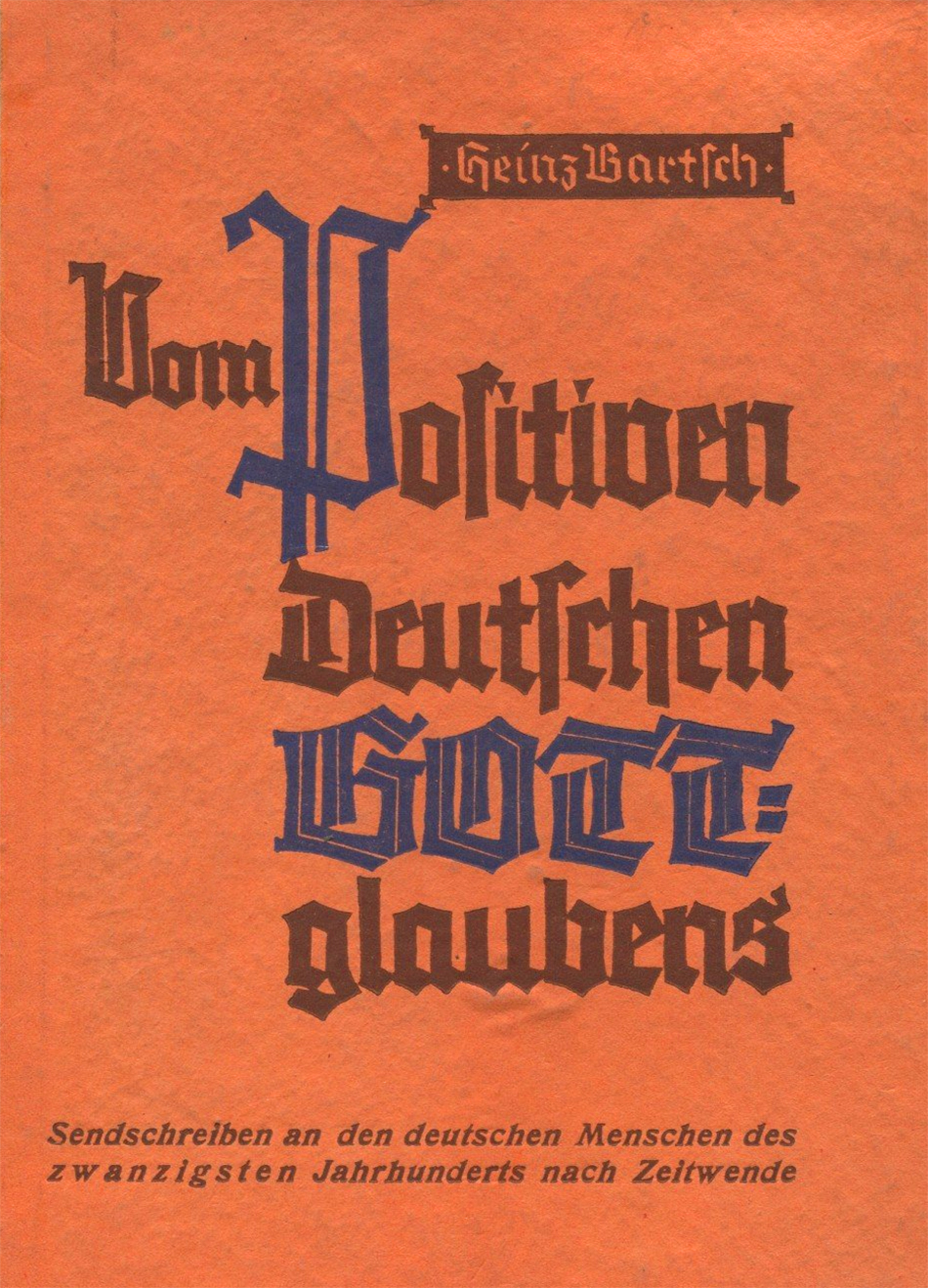
On the Positive in German God-belief (1939)

Gottgläubigkeit was promoted as part of the de-confessionalisation (German: Entkonfessionalisierung) policy. German historians Harry Oelke and Siegfried Hermle wrote:

In order to achieve the so-called de-confessionalisation of public life, the stigma associated with not belonging to a church had to be eliminated. Consequently, starting in November 1936, the term gottgläubig officially came to denote non-membership in a recognized religious community.

After coming to power in 1933, the upper cadres of the Nazi Party concluded that their worldview was incompatible with Christianity, even if it was considered too risky to state this publicly; because of this, the party was still committed to Positive Christianity on paper. During the 1934 party congress, Hitler declared: "Religions, too, only make sense if they serve to preserve the living substance of humanity." Hitler clarified that by humanity he meant the allegedly 'superior' part of humanity – the Aryan race. Positive Christianity proved unsuccessful, and as the Nazi hypothesis that Jesus Christ was an 'Aryan' rather than Jewish became untenable, further discussions were suppressed on this topic. Instead, it was decided that the party should pursue a policy of separating the Nazi state from Christianity completely.

To achieve this, the Interior Minister Wilhelm Frick proposed a policy of "de-confessionalisation", which assumed cautiously removing religious communities from German culture and identity without altering the legal relationship between the state and the churches. Rudolf Hess expanded upon this concept and coined his own term – "denominationalisation". Hess embarked on this policy by purging religious influence from the Nazi party; in November 1935, he ordered that all major figures of the party were to "refrain from any interference in church or religious matters", including individual actions. Bormann also contributed to this policy by implementing an espionage program on German clergymen under the slogan of ensuring religious neutrality. Subsequently, Hess started implementing policies that affected all members of the NSDAP. In May 1936, he banned party members from belonging to Christian student and academic associations, and in June 1936 party members were not allowed to participate in any religious events while wearing party badges or uniforms.

In 1937, this policy was escalated further by a decree from November 1937, in which Bormann banned all party members in party uniform from attending "denominational events inside and outside the church and meetings of other ideological communities", with religious communities such as the "German Faith Movement" (German: Deutsche Glaubensbewegung) and "German Knowledge of God (House of Ludendorff)" (German: Deutsche Gotterkenntnis (Haus Ludendorff)) being explicitly mentioned as ideological communities; the only exception to this rule was granted in case of funerals. Here the policy also started directly targeting churches, explaining the new laws as a way to ensure the 'neutrality' of both the churches and the state. Catholic press was severely limited and effectively banned, with German historian Friedrich Zipfel remarking: "The possibilities for publication were so severely restricted that ultimately it was no longer possible to think of really informing the people of the church." Church authorities that continued to publish church newspapers or communicate with other congregations were threatened with confiscations, arrests and legal proceedings, and were suppressed by SS or police crackdowns.

In accordance to this policy, the nondenominational "Gottgläubigkeit" that the Nazi state promoted was "not only alien to Christianity, but opposed to it". Following a moral code based on the "sense of morality and ethics of the Germanic race", Nazi Gottgläubigkeit no longer tried to dispute the Jewish origins of Christianity as the early concepts of Positive Christianity did, but rather embraced the fact and used it to rally against the "Jewish spirit" that was present in Christianity. The Bible was denounced as a product of "Jewish fabulism", and the dogmas of Christian churches, with the Catholic Church in particular, were mocked. Commenting on the dogmatism of Catholicism, Hitler remarked: "I don't care about dogmas." Describing the undogmatic character of the Gottgläubigkeit, Hitler described it as "worship in solemn form without theological party bickering, with a fraternal tone of genuine love without humble theatre and empty formulaic chatter, without those disgusting frocks and women's skirts... You can serve God in heroic garb alone." This gave the Nazi-promoted nondenominationalism a very vague character.

Ultimately, the policy was considered unsuccessful and had no considerable effect. Even in the SS, the champion of anti-Christian sentiment, the majority of members still belonged to a Christian church. By the end of 1938, 25% of all SS members became Gottgläubig, overtaking Catholicism which was already severely underrepresented and relatively rare amongst SS troops. However, almost 50% of the SS remained members of Protestant churches. Amongst the general population, the Catholic Church, which was the primary target of the Nazi anti-religious policy, suffered almost no defections and an overwhelming majority of the Gottgläubiger came from Protestant churches where "German-Christian" or reichskirchliche influences grew in strength. In Berlin, where Gottgläubigkeit proved most successful, 77% of the city's population was Protestant prior to the introduction of Nazi policy, with Catholics making up 10% of the population and 13% belonging to other religions (including the Jews, which made up 4% of the Berlin population). By 1939, 10% of the city became gottgläubig, whereas Protestantism declined to 70% and non-Christian religions to 8%. Meanwhile, Berlin Catholicism was not only unaffected by Gottgläubigkeit, but slightly grew to 11% of the population.

The gottgläubig population was almost exclusively present in large cities. Berlin had an exceptionally high percentage of the Gottgläubiger, which made up 10% of the city's population. This was followed by Hamburg (7.2%), Vienna (6.2%) and Thuringia (5.8%). It was observed that Gottgläubigkeit proved most successful in anti-clerical areas, which made large cities susceptible to the Nazi anti-religious policy. The anti-Christian character of Gottgläubigkeit was affirmed by Nazi leadership, with Bormann writing in 1941:

National Socialist and Christian conceptions are incompatible. The Christian churches build on peoples' uncertainty and attempt to maintain this fear in the widest possible section of the population, since only in this way can the Christian churches keep their power. By contrast National Socialism rests upon scientific foundations. Christianity has inalterable foundations, which were established almost 2000 years ago and which have stiffened into dogmas alien to reality. On the other hand, National Socialism, if its task is to be fulfilled, must always be geared towards the newest findings of scientific research. ... It follows from the incompatibility of National Socialist and Christian concepts that we are to reject a strengthening of existing Christian confessions.

— Richard Steigmann-Gall, The Holy Reich: Nazi Conceptions of Christianity, 1919–1945 (2003), p. 245

== Demography ==
1939 German religion census:
1. Protestants (54.0%)
2. Catholics (40.5%)
3. Gottgläubig (3.50%)
4. Jewish (0.40%)
5. Other religions (0.10%)
6. Irreligious (1.50%)

People who identified as Gottgläubig could hold a wide range of religious beliefs, including non-clerical Christianity, Germanic Neopaganism, a generic non-Christian theism, deism, and pantheism. However, the Gottgläubigkeit was itself considered a form of deism, and was "predominantly based on creationist and deistic views". Strictly speaking, Gottgläubigen were not even required to terminate their church membership, but strongly encouraged to. The Gottgläubigen also included atheists who chose this identification as to either express their support for the NSDAP, or to avoid the negatively-associated label with atheism, as it was associated with "atheistic Bolshevism".

By the decree of the Reich Ministry of the Interior of 26 November 1936, this religious descriptor was officially recognised on government records. The census of 17 May 1939 was the first time that German citizens were able to officially register as Gottgläubig. Out of 79.4 million Germans, 2.7 million people (3.5%) claimed to be Gottgläubig, compared to 42.8 million Protestants (54%), 32.3 million Catholics (40.5%), 314,000 Jews (0.4%), 86,000 adherents of other religions (0.1%, including Germanic Neopagans, Buddhists, Hindus, Muslims, and other religious sects and movements), and 1.2 million (1.5%) who had no faith (glaubenslos). Paradoxically, Germans living in urban areas, where support for the Nazi Party was the lowest, were the most likely to identify as Gottgläubig, the five highest rates being found in Berlin (10.2%), Hamburg (7.5%), Vienna (6.4%), Düsseldorf (6.0%), and Essen (5.3%).

Majority of the Gottgläubigen came from anti-clericals and Protestants, with an SS report from 1939 writing that "one can be certain that the Protestant portion of the population displays greater appreciation for the struggle and the task of the SS, and hence is more readily recruited [to Gottgläubigkeit] than the Catholic [portion]." Before launching the anti-confessional campaign, the Nazi party promoted Protestantism, with Himmler going as far as stating that "to be Protestant is to be Germanic, but also that to be Germanic is to be Protestant." Nazi propaganda depicted Luther as a rebel against the "Jewish" Catholic Church and the "Jew-popes", portraying the Protestant Reformations as a struggle that "has always been a hallmark of Germanic blood or German blood"; conversely, party members promoted Luther's "On the Jews and Their Lies" and used passages from it as a justification of Nazi antisemitism.

According to Richard Steigmann-Gall, in Austria "Protestants had stood in the forefront of support for Nazism and Austria's reintegration into Germany." After 1933, Austria and Sudetenland experienced a large increase of converts from Catholicism to Protestantism, with this trend including leader of the Sudeten SdP Konrad Henlein, who converted for "conviction and love for his Volk". In 1941 Bormann observed that those who converted to Protestantism after 1933 consequently left the church to become gottgläubig instead, showing that the conversions to Protestantism and then Gottgläubigkeit were manifestations of support for the Nazi party.

The term Gottgläubig still appeared sporadically a few years after the end of the Second World War, and was recognised in the 1946 census inside the French Occupation Zone, before it faded from official documents.

== Himmler and the SS ==
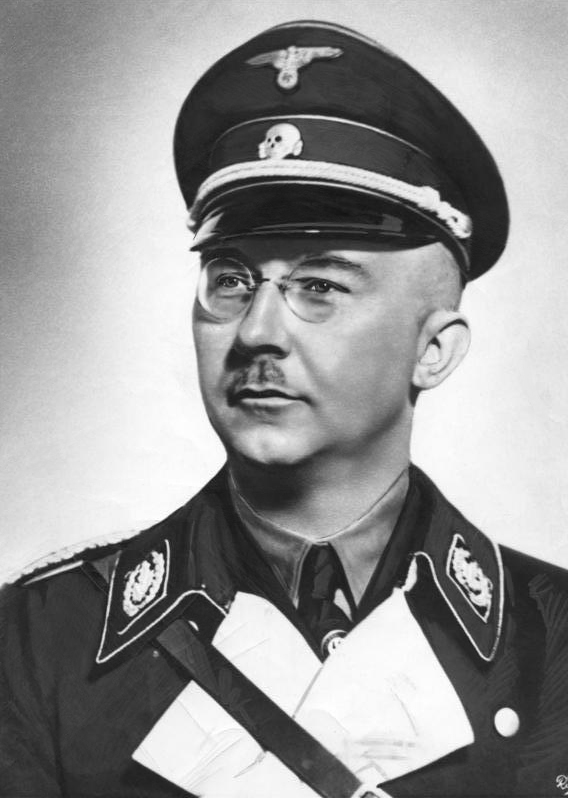
Heinrich Himmler: "We believe in a God Almighty who stands above us; he has created the Earth, the Fatherland, and the Volk, and he has sent us the Führer. Any human being who does not believe in God should be considered arrogant, megalomaniacal, and stupid and thus not suited for the SS."

Reichsführer-SS Heinrich Himmler, himself a former Roman Catholic, was one of the main promoters of the Gottgläubig faith. He was particularly hostile towards Christianity, its values, the churches, and their clergy. Himmler viewed all of Christianity and the priesthood as nothing but an indecent union, with the majority of its priesthood constituting "an erotic homosexual league of men" whose only purpose was to create and maintain a "twenty-thousand-year-old Bolshevism." To the Reichsführer-SS Christianity was the greatest plague delivered by history, and he demanded that it be dealt with accordingly. A perennial favorite song of the storm troopers had this refrain: "Storm Trooper Comrades, hang the Jews and put the priests against the wall."

He insisted on the existence of a creator god, who favoured and guided the Third Reich and the German nation, as he announced to the SS: "We believe in a God Almighty who stands above us; he has created the Earth, the Fatherland, and the Volk, and he has sent us the Führer. Any human being who does not believe in God should be considered arrogant, megalomaniacal, and stupid and thus not suited for the SS." He did not allow atheists into the SS, arguing that their "refusal to acknowledge higher powers" would be a "potential source of indiscipline".

Himmler was not particularly concerned by the question how to label this higher power; God Almighty, the Ancient One, Destiny, "Wralda", Nature, etc. were all acceptable, as long as they referred to some "higher power that had created this world and endowed it with the laws of struggle and selection that guaranteed the continued existence of nature and the natural order of things." According to Himmler, "Only he who opposes belief in a higher power is considered godless"; everyone else was Gottgläubig, but should be thus outside of the church. SS members were put under pressure to identify as Gottgläubig and revoke their church membership, if necessary under the threat of expulsion.

The SS personnel records show that most of its members who left the churches of their upbringing, did so just before or shortly after joining the SS. The Sicherheitsdienst (SD) members were the most willing corps within the SS to withdraw from their Christian denominations and change their religious affiliation to the Gottgläubig faith at 90%. Of the SS officers, 74% of those who joined the SS before 1933 did so, while 68% who joined the SS after 1933 would eventually declare themselves Gottgläubige. Of the general SS membership, 16% had left their respective churches by the end of 1937.

== See also ==
- Cult of the Supreme Being
- Esotericism in Germany and Austria
- German Christians movement
- German Faith Movement
- Heathenry (new religious movement)
- Occultism in Nazism
- Positive Christianity
- Religion in Nazi Germany
- Religious aspects of Nazism
- Thule Society
