= Baháʼí Faith in Germany =

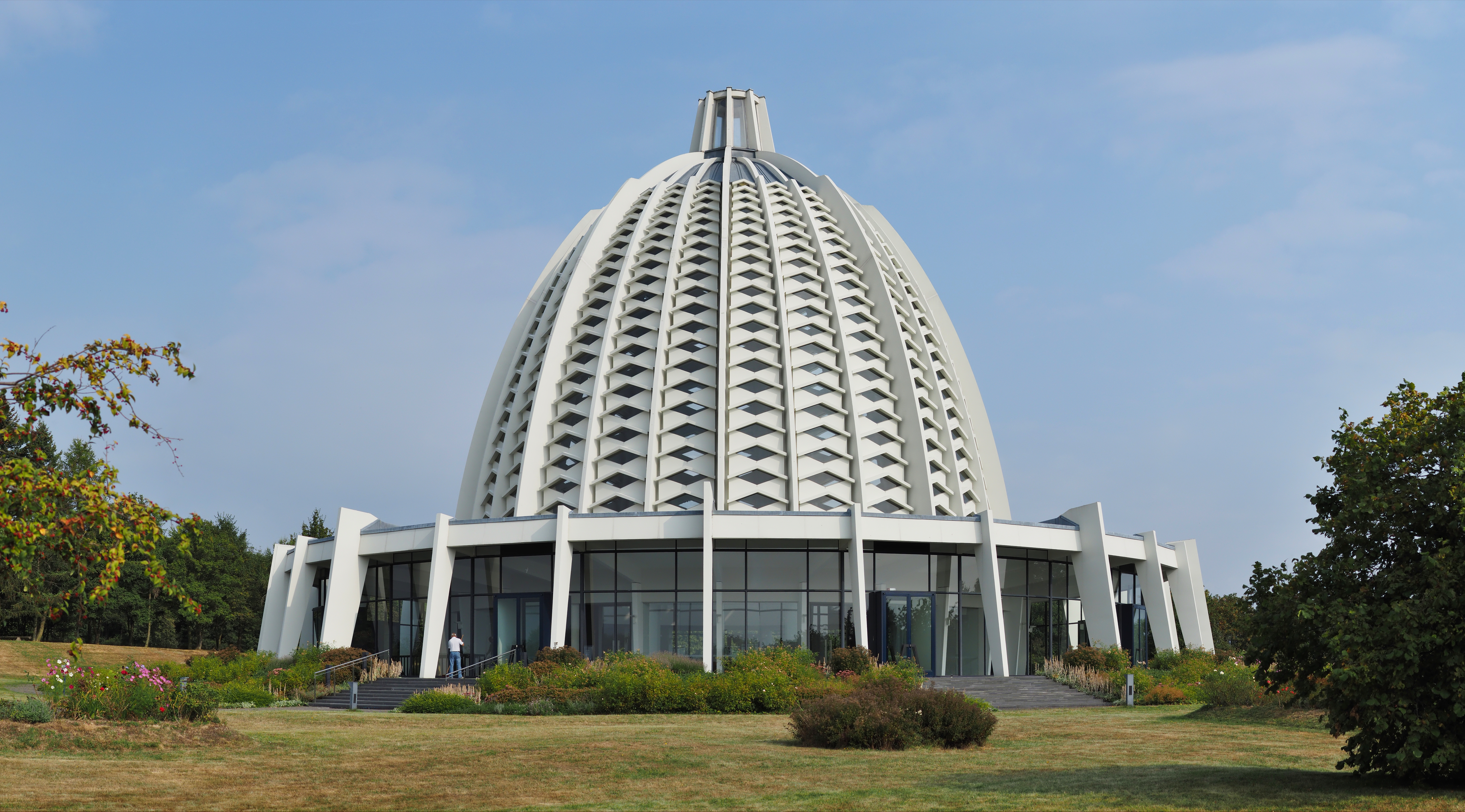
Baháʼí House of Worship in Langenhain near Frankfurt

Though mentioned in German literature in the 19th century, the history of the Baháʼí Faith in Germany (German: Bahaitum) begins in the early 20th century when two emigrants to the United States returned on prolonged visits to Germany bringing their newfound religion. The first Baháʼí Local Spiritual Assembly was established following the conversion of enough individuals to elect one in 1908. After the visit of ʻAbdu'l-Bahá, then head of the religion, and the establishing of many further assemblies across Germany despite the difficulties of World War I, elections were called for the first Baháʼí National Spiritual Assembly in 1923. Banned for a time by the Nazi government and then in East Germany, the religion re-organized and was soon given the task of building the first Baháʼí House of Worship for Europe. After German reunification the community multiplied its interests across a wide range of concerns earning the praise of German politicians. German Census data shows 5,600 registered Baháʼís in Germany in 2012. The Association of Religion Data Archives (relying on World Christian Encyclopedia) estimated some 11,743 Baháʼís in 2005 and 12,356 Baháʼís in 2010. According to the National Spiritual Assembly of the Baha'is of Germany, the German Baha'i community consists of about 100 local communities and 6000 members, towards the end of 2019.

== First century ==
=== Early phase ===
Ibrahim George Kheiralla, an early Baháʼí from Lebanon, traveled through Germany in 1892 attempting to making a living but found no interest in his inventions and moved on to the United States in February, 1893. There he managed to convert some individuals by 1895 (see Thornton Chase.) Following these conversions, some German emigrants became Baháʼís as well. Two in particular traveled back to Germany: Edwin Fischer and Alma Knobloch. Dr. Edwin Fischer, a dentist, had emigrated in 1878 from Germany to New York City, became a Baháʼí there, and then returned to Stuttgart in 1905. Fisher used every opportunity, including talking with his patients, to mention the Baháʼí teachings, and in time a few Germans embraced the religion. The other German Baháʼí, Alma Knobloch, became a Baháʼí in 1903, before Fischer, but arrived in Germany in 1907. This small group of Baháʼís began to organize and formed a Baháʼí Local Spiritual Assembly in 1908 and by 1909 began self-publishing pamphlets and letters and Baháʼí books including the Hidden Words and a history of the religion by Knobloch. The second spiritual assembly in Germany was founded in 1909 in Esslingen.

In the German Colony in Palestine, as part of the worldwide German diaspora, "Frau Doktor Fallscheer" was the family physician for the family of ʻAbdu'l-Bahá, son of the founder of the religion. Fallscheer later became a Baháʼí when she moved back to Germany by 1930. Prominent early Baháʼí Louis George Gregory stayed at a hotel in the German Colony in Haifa during his Baháʼí pilgrimage to Palestine in the spring of 1911 and on his return trip visited in Germany at the request of ʻAbdu'l-Bahá in the fall of 1912.

=== ʻAbdu'l-Bahá's visit to Germany ===
ʻAbdu'l-Bahá, then head of the religion, visited Germany for 8 days in 1913, including visiting Stuttgart, Esslingen and Bad Mergentheim. During this visit he spoke to a youth group as well as a gathering of Esperantists. In less than a decade Baháʼí sources state there were some 300 Baháʼís in Germany by the time of ʻAbdu'l-Bahá's arrival. See ʻAbdu'l-Bahá's journeys to the West.

ʻAbdu'l-Bahá wrote a series of letters, or tablets, to the followers of the religion in the United States in 1916–1917; these letters were compiled together in the book Tablets of the Divine Plan. The seventh of the tablets mentioned European regions and was written on April 11, 1916, but was delayed in being presented in the United States until 1919—after the end of the First World War and the Spanish flu. The seventh tablet was translated and presented on April 4, 1919, and published in Star of the West magazine on December 12, 1919 and mentioned Germany. He says:

"In brief, this world-consuming war has set such a conflagration to the hearts that no word can describe it. In all the countries of the world the longing for universal peace is taking possession of the consciousness of men. There is not a soul who does not yearn for concord and peace. A most wonderful state of receptivity is being realized.… Therefore, O ye believers of God! Show ye an effort and after this war spread ye the synopsis of the divine teachings in the British Isles, France, Germany, Austria-Hungary, Russia, Italy, Spain, Belgium, Switzerland, Norway, Sweden, Denmark, Holland, Portugal, Rumania, Serbia, Montenegro, Bulgaria, Greece, Andorra, Liechtenstein, Luxembourg, Monaco, San Marino, Balearic Isles, Corsica, Sardinia, Sicily, Crete, Malta, Iceland, Faroe Islands, Shetland Islands, Hebrides and Orkney Islands."

ʻAbdu'l-Bahá praised the German Baháʼís - "individuals...endued with perceptive eyes and attentive ears" were "attracted to the principles of the oneness of mankind" and treated "all the peoples and kindreds of the earth in a spirit of concord and fellowship." He predicted Germany will "surpass all other regions" and "lead all the nations and peoples of Europe spiritually." Shoghi Effendi, head of the religion after the death of ʻAbdu'l-Bahá, continued commentary about Germany and its Baháʼís; he wrote that during the Nazi government the German Baháʼís demonstrated that they were the "great-hearted, indefatigable, much admired German Baháʼí community".

=== World War I ===
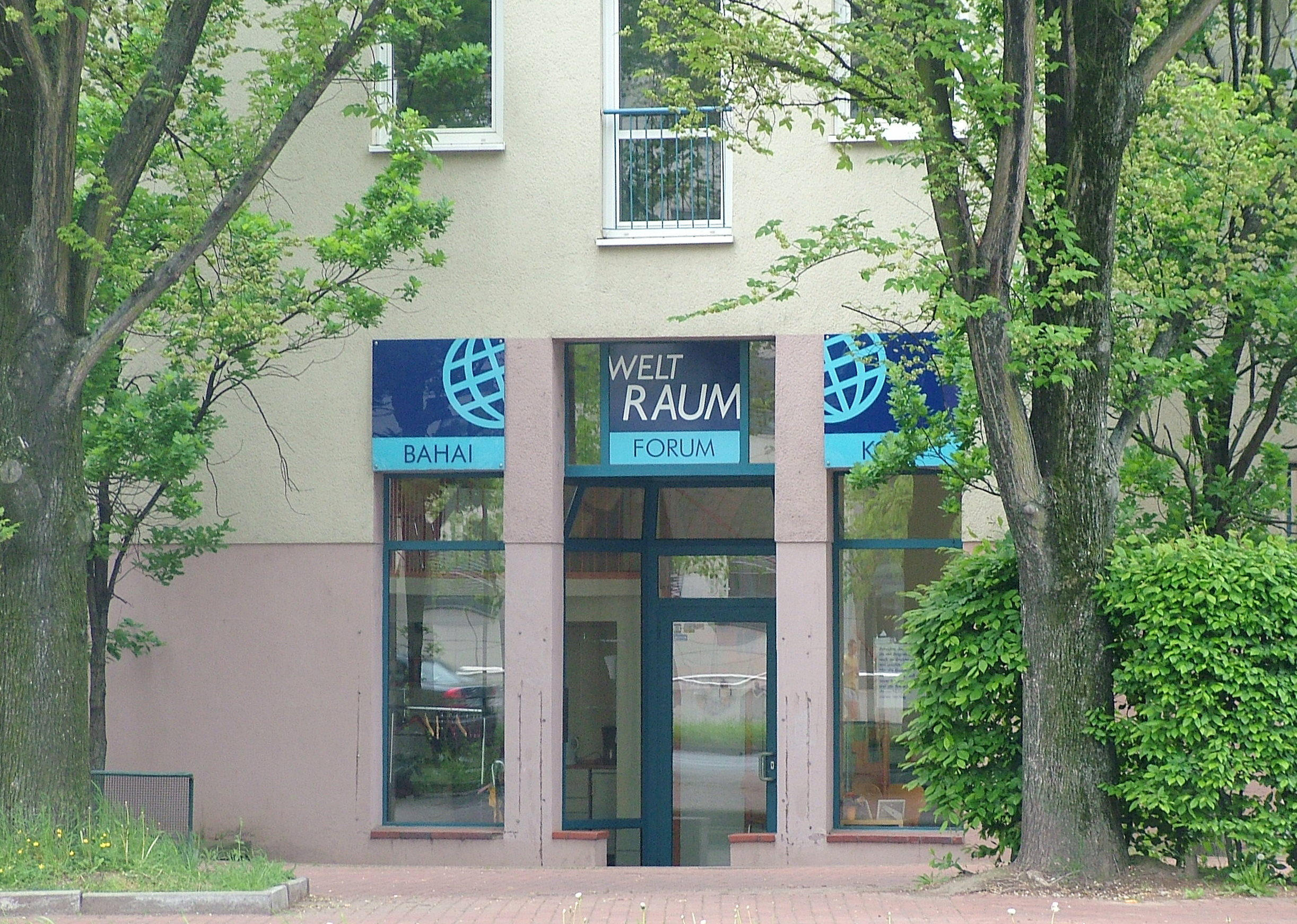
Baháʼí community center in Cologne, Germany

As World War I was becoming more widespread in its ramifications, the Baháʼís pursued other courses of action. In 1916 a plaque was raised to honor ʻAbdu'l-Bahá's visit at Bad Mergentheim. On May 23, 1916, Austrian Franz Pöllinger learned of the religion while staying in Stuttgart and on returning to Austria had a prominent role in the growth of the religion there. When the United States entered the war, individuals from there, as Fischer and Knobloch, had to leave Germany and both returned to the United States. On return to the US Fischer went to the Los Angeles area and Knobloch went to New York. In a wave of anti-German sentiment (see German American internment for similar issues a generation later) Fischer was caught up in charges of espionage for Germany which were dismissed. As Germany was allied with the Ottoman Empire, the Sinai and Palestine Campaign of World War I played an important role with the Baháʼís in Palestine - particularly the Battle of Megiddo in September 1918. As a direct result of the events of the battle, ʻAbdu'l-Bahá was rescued after death threats were made against him in case the Ottoman side was to lose (events in which Wellesley Tudor Pole played a significant part.)

=== Post-War closing ===
After WWI, the national Baháʼí community organized a German Baháʼí Publishing Trust and in 1920 Adelbert Mühlschlegel became a Baháʼí, and later appointed as a Hand of the Cause, individuals who have been considered to have achieved a distinguished rank in service to the religion. He was the first of three believers who decisively influenced the German Baháʼís. As with other German emigrants who converted to the religion, Siegfried Schopflocher who was born in Germany, as an Orthodox Jew, sought out a wider unity and found the Baháʼí Faith while in Canada in the summer of 1921; he was also later appointed a Hand of the Cause. ʻAbdu'l-Bahá's last tablet before his death was addressed to the Baháʼís in Stuttgart in November 1921.

=== Inter-war period ===
In 1921 a new magazine Sun of Truth was first published as one of five Baháʼí journals produced by German Baháʼís through the 1920s. It contained newly translated Baháʼí literature and news from the Baháʼí community around the world.

In 1923 the first Baháʼí National Spiritual Assemblies were elected "where conditions are favorable and the number of the friends has grown and reached a considerable size". Along with India and the British Isles, the National Spiritual Assembly of the Baháʼís of Germany and Austria was first elected in that year. In 1925 there were 95 delegates who performed the election. A 1925 list of local Baháʼí Centers mentions no less than 26 in Germany, compared to three in England and two in Switzerland. In late 1926 and again in 1929 widely traveled Martha Root spoke in most German universities and technical colleges. Eugen Schmidt, the second of the three believers who decisively influenced the German Baháʼís, became a Baháʼí and was elected a member of the National Spiritual Assembly of Germany from 1932 for many years and served as chairman in the decisive years of re-building after World War II.

Among the Baháʼís to visit Germany were Amelia Collins, Marion Jack and Louisa Mathew Gregory, wife of Louis George Gregory. Another Baháʼí with links to Germany was Robert Sengstacke Abbott whose adoptive father was German and, through his family connection, he kept in contact with his family in Germany. In 1930 the national convention included delegates from Stuttgart, Rostock, Hamburg, Schwerin, Karlsruhe, Göppingen, Bissingen, and from Vienna. The 1931 national assembly included four women and five men. In 1935 Shoghi Effendi, then head of the religion, re-organized the German community to cover Austria as well so they shared a regional national assembly.

=== Nazi period ===
During the early Nazi period Baháʼís had general freedom; Mary Maxwell Rúhíyyih Khánum, before becoming wife of Shoghi Effendi, had expressed a great desire to learn Spanish. However, her plans to travel to Republican Spain were thwarted with the Spanish Civil War. Instead, Mary chose to live with her cousin in Nazi Germany in 1935, a move which was endorsed by Shoghi Effendi, and he encouraged Mary to strengthen the fledgling Baháʼí community. For 18 months the young Mary assimilated herself in German culture, wearing a dirndl and learning to speak German fluently. Whilst in Germany in 1936, Mary received an invitation from Shoghi Effendi to go on pilgrimage with her mother. Both mother and daughter accepted the invitation, and this trip culminated with Mary's marriage to the Guardian in March 1937.

May Maxwell, wife of William Sutherland Maxwell, was able to travel through Germany in 1936, though the plaque commemorating ʻAbdu'l-Bahá's visit had been taken down. By 1937 however, Heinrich Himmler signed an order disbanding the Baháʼí Faith's institutions in Germany because of its 'international and pacifist tendencies'. In 1939 and in 1942 there were sweeping arrests of former members of the National Spiritual Assembly. In May 1944 there was a public trial in Darmstadt at which Dr. Hermann Grossmann was allowed to defend the character of the religion but the Baháʼís were instead heavily fined and its institutions continued to be disbanded. However, for this service and others, Grossmann was ranked as the third of the three believers who decisively influenced the German Baháʼís.

=== After the Nazi period ===
Following the fall of Nazi Germany, an American Baháʼí, John C. Eichenauer who was a medic of the 100th Infantry division then at Geislingen started searching for the Baháʼí community in Stuttgart. He drove through Stuttgart looking and asking for Baháʼís and was able to find an individual by nightfall/curfew. The next day saw the first meeting of Baháʼís since their disbandment in 1937. Two other American Baháʼís, Bruce Davison and Henry Jarvis, in Frankfurt and Heidelberg respectively, also connected with the Baháʼí community in Germany. At the beginning of the partition of Germany there were about 150 German Baháʼís in the American section and they became registered with the American authorities. The National Spiritual Assembly was re-elected in 1946 and by 1950 there were 14 Local Spiritual Assemblies:

Bergstrasse	Darmstadt	Esslingen	Frankfurt	Göppingen	Hamburg	Heidelberg
Karlsruhe	Leipzig	Nürnberg	Plochingen	Schwerin	Stuttgart	Wiesbaden

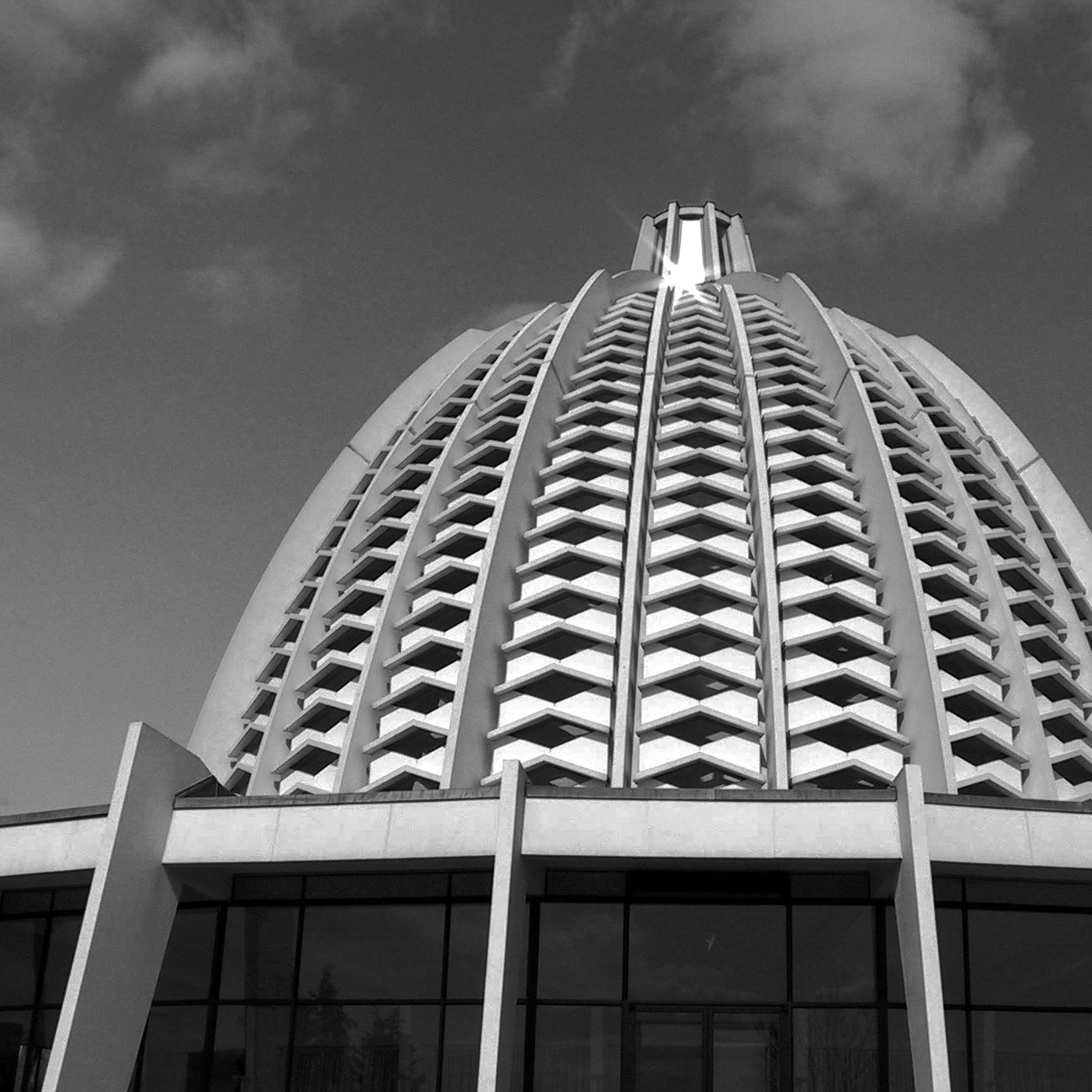
Baháʼí House of Worship in Langenhain near Frankfurt

and smaller Baháʼí communities in 27 cities.

However, in Soviet controlled East Germany, the Baháʼí Faith was again disbanded in 1948. In West Germany, by 1954 there were reports of large growth in the religion, and from 1951 to 1966 philately stationery and a "Cinderella stamp" religious stationery were produced in West Germany.

==== House of Worship ====
The construction of the Baháʼí House of Worship in Langenhain near Frankfurt, began in 1952. Hand of the Cause Amelia Collins represented the Baháʼí International Community at the groundbreaking 20 November 1960. Designated as the "Mother Temple of Europe", it was dedicated in 1964 by Hand of the Cause Ruhiyyih Khanum, representing the first elected Universal House of Justice.

==== Development in West Germany ====
By 1963 the list of local assemblies was:

Aachen	Berlin	Baden-Baden	Bonn	Braunschweig	Darmstadt	Düsseldorf
Ebingen	Erlangen	Essen	Esslingen	Frankfurt	Freiburg	Giessen
Göppingen	Hamburg	Hannover	Heidelberg	Heilbronn	Karlsruhe	Kiel
Köln	Leinfelden	Ludwigsburg	Mannheim	München	Nürnberg	Stuttgart
Ulm	Wiesbaden					

Isolated Baháʼís were found in an additional 86 locations.

West German Baháʼís were given the responsibility of trying to strengthen the Baháʼí community in Russia in 1963. During the 1960s and 1970s, a small number of Baháʼís visited the Soviet Union as tourists but no attempt was made to promulgate the religion. In 1986 Friedo and Shole Zölzer and Karen Reitz from Germany traveled into the Soviet Union but remained for only short periods of time. Continuing in the 1980s and into the 1990s the Baháʼí Esperanto-League began to prosper especially in West Germany. One reason behind this was that Esperanto had acquired the reputation of being an "entrance ticket" to countries behind the Iron Curtain, countries to which the Baháʼí Faith had had little access during the preceding decades (the first post-World War II Baháʼí know to pioneer to Russia was in 1979.)

=== Reunion ===
Following the German reunification in 1989-91 the Federal Constitutional Court of Germany handed down a judgment affirming the status of the Baháʼí Faith as a religion in Germany. Continued development of youth oriented programs included the Diversity Dance Theater (see Oscar DeGruy) which traveled to Albania in February 1997. Udo Schaefer et al.'s 2001 Making the Crooked Straight was written to refute a polemic supported by the Evangelical Church in Germany written in 1981. Since its publication the Evangelical Church in Germany has revised its own relationship to the German Baháʼí Community. Former member of the federal parliament Ernst Ulrich von Weizsaecker commended the ideas of the German Baháʼí community on social integration, which were published in a statement in 1998, and Chancellor Helmut Kohl sent a congratulatory message to the 1992 ceremony marking the 100th Anniversary of the Ascension of Baháʼu'lláh.

== Multiplying interests ==
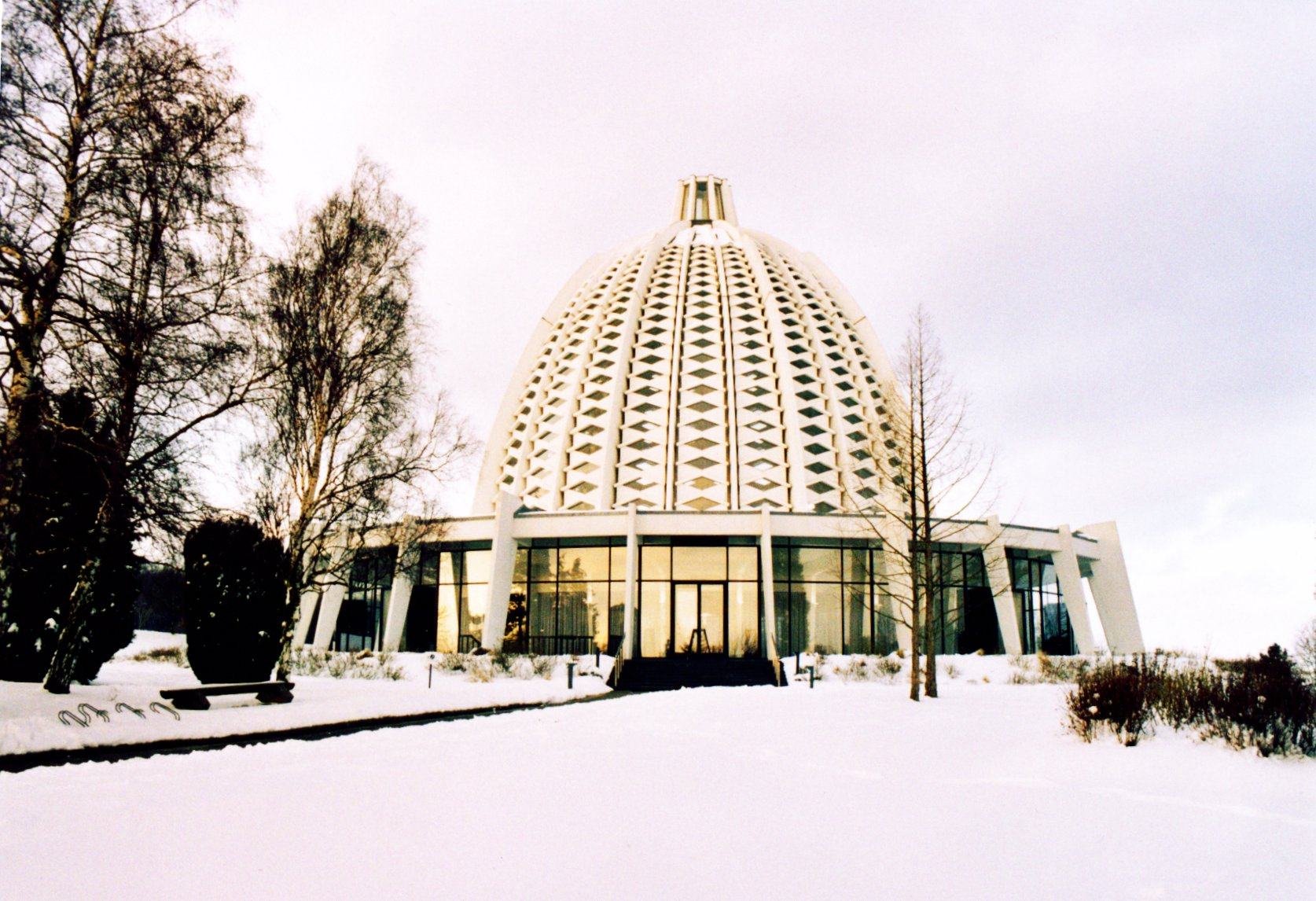
The Baháʼí House of Worship during snow.

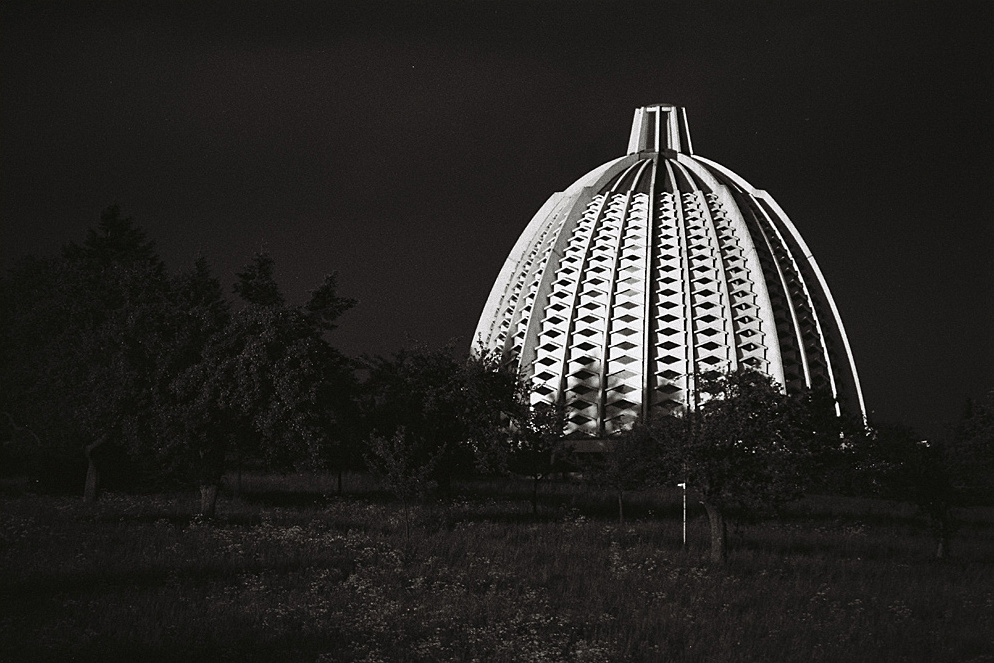
Baháʼí House of Worship

Since its inception the religion has had involvement in socio-economic development beginning by giving greater freedom to women, promulgating the promotion of female education as a priority concern, and that involvement was given practical expression by creating schools, agricultural coops, and clinics. The religion entered a new phase of activity when a message of the Universal House of Justice dated 20 October 1983 was released. Baháʼís were urged to seek out ways, compatible with the Baháʼí teachings, in which they could become involved in the social and economic development of the communities in which they lived. World-wide in 1979 there were 129 officially recognized Baháʼí socio-economic development projects. By 1987, the number of officially recognized development projects had increased to 1482. Nearing the century mark of the Baháʼí community in Germany, the Baháʼís in Germany have begun efforts in diverse fields of interest. An estimated 500,000 people visited the Baháʼí pavilion at the Hanover Expo 2000. The 170 square-meter Baháʼí exhibit, hosted by the Baháʼí International Community and the National Spiritual Assembly of the Baháʼís of Germany, featured development projects in Colombia, Kenya and Eastern Europe that illustrated the importance of grassroots capacity-building, the advancement of women, and moral and spiritual values in the process of social and economic development. The German community organized a national Baháʼí Choir in 2001 which tours various events in Germany and Europe. In 2002 the director of the Ernst Lange-Institute for Ecumenical Studies held a meeting under the auspices of the German Federal Environment Ministry titled "Orientation dialogue of religions represented in Germany on environmental politics with reference to the climate issue" for the interfaith community including the Baháʼís. In 2005 former federal Minister of the Interior, Otto Schily, praised the contributions of German Baháʼís to the social stability of the country, noting "It is not enough to make a declaration of belief. It is important to live according to the basic values of our constitutional state, to defend them and make them secure in the face of all opposition. The members of the Baháʼí Faith do this because of their faith and the way they see themselves." However the Baháʼís have been excluded from other dialogues on religious issues. In 2007 a new memorial was unveiled replacing the one that had been taken down in Bad Mergentheim during Nazi Germany. Baháʼís from much of Europe were among the more than 4,600 people who gathered in Frankfurt for the largest ever Baháʼí conference in Germany in February 2009.

== Demographics ==
A 1997-8 estimate is of 4,000 Baháʼís in Germany (40 in Hannover). In 2002 there were 106 Local Spiritual Assemblies. The 2007-8 German Census using sampling estimated 5–6,000 registered Baháʼí members in Germany. The Association of Religion Data Archives (relying on World Christian Encyclopedia) estimated some 11,743 Baháʼís in 2005 and 12,356 Baháʼís in 2010. According to the National Spiritual Assembly of the Baha'is of Germany, the German Baha'i community consists of about 100 local communities and 6000 members, towards the end of 2019.

=== Artists ===
Among the better known Baháʼí artists of Germany are:

- Peter Held - Composer pianist.
- Parisa Badiyi - violinist and educator
- Brigitte Schirren - textiles
- Hans J. Knospe - photopoetry
- Anne Bahrinipour - painting, sculpture

== Prophecies regarding Germany ==
The writings of Baháʼu'lláh and ʻAbdu'l-Bahá in the late 19th century and early 20th century contain some prophecies regarding Germany. The first mention related to Germany in the Baháʼí Faith is when the founder of the religion, Baháʼu'lláh wrote in the Kitáb-i-Aqdas in 1873:

O banks of the Rhine! We have seen you covered with gore, inasmuch as the swords of retribution were drawn against you; and you shall have another turn. And We hear the lamentations of Berlin, though she be today in conspicuous glory.

In 1912, shortly before visiting Germany, ʻAbdu'l-Bahá spoke of the increasing tensions in Europe:

We are on the eve of the Battle of Armageddon referred to in the sixteenth chapter of Revelation... The time is two years hence, when only a spark will set aflame the whole of Europe... by 1917 kingdoms will fall and cataclysms will rock the earth.

and in January 1920 he wrote:

The ills from which the world now suffers... will multiply; the gloom which envelops it will deepen. The Balkans will remain discontented. Its restlessness will increase. The vanquished Powers will continue to agitate. They will resort to every measure that may rekindle the flame of war.

== See also ==
- History of Germany
- Religion in Germany
- Religion in Nazi Germany
