= Adelbert Mühlschlegel =

Prominent German Bahá'í

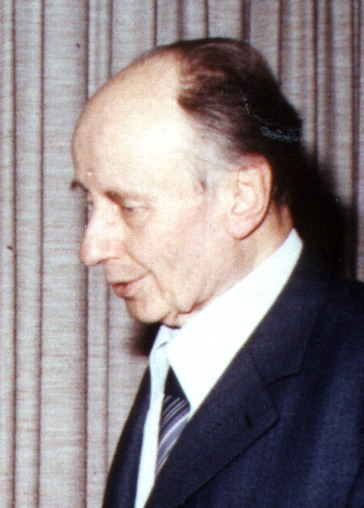
Dr. Adelbert Mühlschlegel (1978)

Adelbert Mühlschlegel (June 16, 1897 – July 29, 1980) was a prominent German Baháʼí from a Protestant family. He became a Baháʼí in 1920, translated Baháʼí literature and served as a member of the National Spiritual Assembly of Germany.

He was appointed a Hand of the Cause by Shoghi Effendi in February 1952, individuals who have been considered to have achieved a distinguished rank in service to the religion. He was the first of three believers who decisively influenced the German Baháʼís. after which he travelled to visit the Baháʼís in many countries. He died in Athens, Greece.
