= Robert Ericksen =

Robert P. Ericksen (born 1945) is a historian of the Holocaust. His book Theologians Under Hitler (1985) was widely acclaimed, and was made into a documentary in 2004. He maintains affiliations with the Humboldt Foundation and the United States Holocaust Memorial Museum, and sits on the editorial board of Kirchliche Zeitgeschichte, a German journal. He is currently professor of history at Pacific Lutheran University.
