= Aurel Kolnai =

Hungarian philosopher (1900–1973)

- Born: December 5, 1900; Budapest, Austria-Hungary
- Died: June 28, 1973 (aged 72); London, England

Philosophical work
- Era: 20th-century philosophy
- Region: Western Philosophy
- Notable ideas: Christian imperfectionism

Aurel Thomas Kolnai (December 5, 1900 – June 28, 1973) was a 20th-century philosopher and political theorist.

== Life ==
Kolnai was born Aurel Stein in Budapest, Hungary to Jewish parents but moved to Vienna before his twentieth birthday to enter Vienna University, where he studied under Heinrich Gomperz, Moritz Schlick, Felix Kaufmann, Karl Bühler, and Ludwig von Mises. It was also at this time that he became attracted to the thinking of Franz Brentano and the phenomenological thought of Brentano's student Edmund Husserl. Kolnai studied under Husserl briefly in 1928 in Freiburg. During the early 1920s, Kolnai wrote as an independent scholar with little success. He graduated summa cum laude in 1926, publishing his dissertation on Der Ethische Wert und die Wirklichkeit, which was received favorably in Germany. In 1926, he also converted to Catholicism, largely influenced by G. K. Chesterton, whom Kolnai viewed as "a brilliant, if unsystematic phenomenologist of common experience." He then began a career of political journalism, writing for Der Österreichische Volkswirt and Die Schöne Zukunft. Acutely aware of the real threat posed by the Nazi Party in Austria, he began writing for Der christliche Ständestaat, a periodical founded to combat Nazism and edited by Dietrich von Hildebrand. During this time, he also published some of his own philosophical writings including his Sexualethik, Der Ekel, Der Inhalt der Politik, and Der Versuch über den Haß. Particularly Kolnai's essays on negative emotions, like disgust and hatred, stand out through "a sensual concreteness that is rare in philosophy". His philosophical writings, though producing little profit for the author, were well received and generated excellent reviews. Salvador Dalí was impressed by Der Ekel; in a 1932 essay for the journal This Quarter, the painter recommended Kolnai's text strongly to other surrealists, praising its analytical power.

During the 1930s, the encroachment of the Nazi Party in Austria remained a major concern. In 1938, Kolnai published his critique of National Socialism titled The War Against the West. The Nazi threat compelled Kolnai to leave Austria in 1937, where he was then a citizen, and depart for France where he married Elisabeth Gemes in 1940, also a Catholic convert. The Vichy threat prevented the newly-wed Kolnai from remaining in France, and after a brief stay in England, Kolnai and his wife moved to Quebec where he accepted a teaching position at the University of Laval. Frustrated by what he saw as the oppressive parochial Catholicism and the rigid neo-Thomism, Kolnai left Quebec in 1955 and returned to England on a Nuffield Foundation Travel Grant. Though he had quite an extensive list of publications in five different languages, Kolnai had little luck finding a permanent professorship in Britain, and fraught with financial worries, his health began to rapidly decline. Due largely to the influence of Harry Acton, Bernard Williams, and David Wiggins, Kolnai was able to secure a part-time "Visiting Lectureship" at Bedford College at London University. In England at this time, Kolnai became very influenced by the English common-sense philosophy of G.E. Moore and other British intuitionists such as H.A. Prichard, E.F. Carritt, and W.D. Ross. In 1961, he received a one-year research fellowship at Birmingham. In 1968, he accepted a visiting professor position at Marquette University in Wisconsin which he maintained until 1973 when he died of a heart attack. Kolnai's wife Elisabeth worked on compiling, translating, and publishing his work until her death in 1982.

== Philosophical writings and major themes ==
Kolnai was an eclectic, well-read thinker in the fields of philosophy, economics, and politics. His major philosophical influences were the phenomenological school of Husserl and British analytic philosophy. A major theme in his writings is the effort to recover the givenness of reality and the sovereignty of the object in order to develop a common-sense approach to philosophy. Kolnai drew on the philosophical realism of Thomas Aquinas and believed that Aquinas could provide a valuable contribution to the recovery of broad dialectical objectivism, but he was opposed to the rigidity of 20th century neo-Thomistic orthodoxy and the dogmatic claims of Thomistic ideology. Kolnai's objectivism rests on four claims:

1. The importance of ordinary experience to provide access to the real
2. The importance of secular experience and common sense in the standards of 'tradition'
3. The importance of philosophical teachers and Authorities to 'guide, instruct, and inform'
4. The importance of receptivity to the 'multiplicity of objects and modes of cognition' to overcome subjectivity

Kolnai was critical of Martin Heidegger's and Sartre's existentialism, claiming that "they have nothing to offer but doom-consciousness spiced with a high-sounding idealistic demand—or worse: a new version of the aesthete's surrender to active barbarism, an espousal of totalitarian tyranny as the next best substitute for the impossible pursuit of total freedom." Because the world was fallen and tension-ridden, Kolnai thought that Christianity should make its concern the secular world, in order to instill in it practical reason and morality, as expressed in a revealing passage in The War Against the West:

Personally I am inclined to think that in spite of its Christian polish, Luther's pessimism is more pagan than Hegel's pagan optimism, the latter being not entirely foreign to nineteenth-century progressive and constitutionalist views. For black despair is the very core of overweening arrogance. It is true that with Luther this is wrapped in the thread-bare guise of reckless belief in God's grace independent of man's conduct. Hegel, on the other hand, preserves some elements of actual morality.

Another major theme in Kolnai's writings is his anti-utopianism. Daniel Mahoney contextualizes Kolnai's anti-utopianism among such thinkers as Alain Besançon and Václav Havel as well as Solzhenitsyn who viewed utopian thinking as the ideological underpinning of totalitarianism. Kolnai explores what he calls the "utopian mind" phenomenologically, which he links with what he calls the "perfectionist illusion", which is marked by the view that human goods existing in a state of tension can somehow be reconciled. The reconciliation of value and reality, according to Kolnai "suggests the idea of a rupture between the given reality of the world and the counter-reality 'set apart.'" Kolnai thought that the identification of utopianism with a search for justice was misguided, led to the "forced negation of ineliminable tensions." The quest for a utopia was, in its essence, a quest for a world no longer fraught with tension or human alienation—a quest which Kolnai saw as doomed to inevitable failure.

Kolnai's political thought arises from both his phenomenological method and his belief in the importance of philosophy for human life. His emphasis on common sense and his practical point of view frames his political discussions in which he expresses himself as a genuine conservative, praising such concepts as social privilege and hierarchy. However, though Kolnai was sympathetic to what he called "the conservative ethos", he was not a partisan thinker but rather a self-proclaimed centrist opposed to all forms of totalitarianism. Kolnai had an ongoing concern that unrestrained liberalism would inevitably end in totalitarianism, and his critiques of liberalism as he saw it manifest in the United States and Europe center on preventing such consequences. While supporting the cause of the liberal West and affirming pluralism, Kolnai also aptly stated that "to love democracy well, it is necessary to love it moderately."

Kolnai's ethical thought is characterized by strong loves and hates and expressed in terms of values and universal meanings. Broadly, his ethical thought can be described as Christian imperfectionism opposed to the elevation of morality beyond the everyday life. The negative character of moral duties was key for Kolnai, as expressed in his treatise on "Morality and Practice II:"

When we speak of 'respecting' alien property (as also life or rights) we use that word in its weak sense of 'leaving alone,' 'not touching,' 'not interfering with,' much as it is used in French medical language (the rash of typhus fever 'respects' the face, i.e. in the soberer style of English textbooks, the face 'escapes'), not in its strong sense of positive appreciation for something distinctively noble and respectable . . .

Kolnai was strongly influenced by Max Scheler's value ethics, and he thought that if all things were viewed axiologically, assessed first for value, as opposed to the language of 'ought' or 'must,' then one was provided with "a realm of approbative or disapprobative insights . . . without stressing the unbridgeable gulf between Is and Ought." Thus,

"value ethics precludes the classic pitfalls in Ethics: Hedonism or Eudemonism; Utilitarianism and Consequentialism of any kind, i.e. the interpretation of moral in terms of allegedly more evident primary, natural cognitive experiences; and various kinds of Imperativism: 'duty' cut off from Good and Bad, and its interpretation in terms either of a concrete (social, monarchical, fashionable . . . ) authority, or the 'rational ego,' or of 'Conscience. . . . Axiological ethic directs our attention not only to the plurality of moral values and disvalues, but to the falseness of every monism in regard to the object of moral valuation: be it action, intention, maxim or motive, virtue and vice, character, and all the more of course wisdom or again ontological perfection."

Kolnai currently remains relatively unknown, but especially in the light of the dialectical return to classical political theory in the writings of Leo Strauss and Eric Voegelin, as well as the recent debates concerning neo-Conservative philosophy, it is likely that Kolnai will receive increasingly more attention in the near future. Kolnai has been praised by influential figures such as Dietrich von Hildebrand, H.B. Acton, Bernard Williams, and Pierre Manent.
