= Eric Kurlander =

American historian (born 1973)

Eric Kurlander (born January 1973) is an American historian who currently serves as the William R. Kenan Jr. Professor of History at Stetson University. He received his B.A. in history from Bowdoin College, and his M.A. and Ph.D. in modern European history from Harvard University. Kurlander is a specialist in modern German history and particularly of Nazi Germany, about which he has written three books. The most recent, Hitler's Monsters: A Supernatural History of the Third Reich, was nominated for the Bookseller/Diagram Prize for Oddest Title of the Year in 2019.

== Selected publications ==
- The Price of Exclusion: Ethnicity, National Identity, and the Decline of German Liberalism, 1898-1933. Berghahn, 2006.
- Living with Hitler: Liberal Democrats in the Third Reich. Yale University Press, New Haven, 2009. ISBN 9780300116663
- Black, Monica; Kurlander, Eric, eds. (2015). Revisiting the "Nazi Occult": Histories, Realities, Legacies. Rochester: Camden House. ISBN 978-1-57113-906-1.
- Hitler's Monsters: A Supernatural History of the Third Reich. Yale University Press, New Haven, 2017. ISBN 9780300189452
