= The War Against the West =

1938 book by Aurel Kolnai

- Author: Aurel Kolnai
- Genre: Non-fiction
- Publication date: 1938

The War Against the West is a critical study of German National Socialism written by Aurel Kolnai and published in 1938. It describes German National Socialism as diametrically opposed to the [classical] liberal, democratic, Constitutional, and free-enterprise "Western" tendencies found mainly within Britain and the United States.

== Overview ==
During the twenties and thirties, Kolnai, who converted to Catholicism under the influence of G.K. Chesterton, read extensively in the German language fascist and national socialist literature. The book compiles and critiques the anti-Enlightenment works of national socialist writers themselves. Kolnai's study was the first comprehensive survey in English of German national socialist ideology as a counter-revolution against what German thinkers saw as the materialistic, rootless civilizations dominated by comfort-addicted, money-and-security-centered, liberal bourgeois and rootless cosmopolitan Jews; the antithesis of the heroic model of more vital civilizations, prepared to risk their lives, to die for ostensibly "higher" ideals. Kolnai argues that national socialist ideology is not only alien to the West, but profoundly disturbing and dangerous.

Kolnai described the German national socialists' war against the West as, in essence, a war of paganism against Christian civilization. In citations from Hitler, Goebbels, and others, Kolnai sought to expose what he saw as "the obsessive German national socialist effort to replace Christianity with a crude and barbaric form of pagan religion, to twist the cross of Christ into a swastika."

== Contents ==
Chapter	Section	Notes
	Preface	Defines German national socialist totalitarianism as a conscious, deliberate revolt of "Germanism" against the freedom of the human personality alike in its religious, social, and political forms. It [German national socialism] is the onslaught of a reborn pagan barbarism upon the spirit and ethics of [classical] liberal Christendom.
	Author's Foreword	Identifies the two outstanding figures who have contributed to the rise of National Socialism as a creed, as Friedrich Nietzsche ("perhaps the greatest Satanist of all times") and Stefan George. Notes the similarities between German national socialism and Italian fascism as anti-democratic, hostile to Western Constitutionalism, paganistic, and totalitarian. Notes the inheritance of Central European Imperialism from the Middle Ages as a feature "beyond even the ideological identity" along with a correlation to "degenerate", (i.e. neo, non-classical) liberalism's cult of "relativism" and "indifferentism".
Chapter I. The Central Meaning of the National Socialist Attitude	1. Tribal Egoism versus Humanity and Objective Standards.
Chapter I. The Central Meaning of the National Socialist Attitude	2. The National "Being" versus Mankind.
Chapter I. The Central Meaning of the National Socialist Attitude	3. The Intellectual Height of Anti-Intellectualism.
Chapter II. Community	1. Community beyond Personality.
Chapter II. Community	2. The "We" Experience.
Chapter II. Community	3. The Eros of Militarism.
Chapter II. Community	4. The Universe of the Particular.
Chapter II. Community	5. Unity and Inequality.
Chapter III. State	1. The Revolt against Liberty.
Chapter III. State	2. The Emancipation of Tyranny.
Chapter III. State	3. The Vice of Democracy.
Chapter III. State	4. Creative Enmity.
Chapter III. State	5. The Mystery of Leadership.
Chapter III. State	6. The Totalitarian State.
Chapter III. State	7. All-Politics, and No-Politics.
Chapter IV. Human Nature and Civilization	1. The Essence of Man: Heroes and Daemons.
Chapter IV. Human Nature and Civilization	2. "Leib" and Life.
Chapter IV. Human Nature and Civilization	3. The Revival of Elemental Forces.
Chapter IV. Human Nature and Civilization	4. The Superstitions of Civilization.
Chapter IV. Human Nature and Civilization	5. At the Gates of Death.
Chapter IV. Human Nature and Civilization	6. Male Supremacy and Feminine Undertone.
Chapter V. Faith and Thought	1. The Relativity of Value — the Absoluteness of Power.
Chapter V. Faith and Thought	2. The New Paganism.
Chapter V. Faith and Thought	3. Christianity Heathenized.
Chapter V. Faith and Thought	4. The God that is Ourselves.
Chapter V. Faith and Thought	5. The Call for Mythology.	Alfred Rosenberg's calls for a "future church", a Volkskirche [People's Church] that is intended to be a "nucleus" protected by the National Socialist State; in due course the "new church" will drain away the influence of the "Roman Haruspex" as well as of the "Old Testament Superintendents" of the fossil called Protestantism.
Chapter VI. Morals, Law and Culture	1. The Expropriation of Reason and Ethics.
Chapter VI. Morals, Law and Culture	2. The Morals of Greatness and Ruthlessness.
Chapter VI. Morals, Law and Culture	3. The Romance of Activity.
Chapter VI. Morals, Law and Culture	4. The Lawless Law.
Chapter VI. Morals, Law and Culture	5. Irrational Science.
Chapter VI. Morals, Law and Culture	6. Education for the Nationalist State.
Chapter VII. Society and Economics	1. The Socialist Phrase.	Among others, Sombart's "essentially regulated planned economy" as a definition for the German "blood and soil" socialism characterized by anti-capitalism and stark opposition to the classical liberalism of life, liberty, and property found primarily in Great Britain before WW II.
Chapter VII. Society and Economics	2. The Revival of Class-Rule.
Chapter VII. Society and Economics	3. Inequalitarian Socialism.	What remains of socialism is an essentially vague ideology of "planning", discipline instead of liberty, dictatorial state interference instead of economic freedom, and a generous grant of "honour" to workers, or more especially to "work".
Chapter VII. Society and Economics	4. The Economics of State-Power.	It is a feature of Fascism that "Capitalism" no longer fends for itself on the open battlefield of economic argument, but takes a concealed stand behind the showy and new-fangled hierarchy of popular dictatorship, which is at one a hireling in its pay and its overlord taking toll from it.
Chapter VII. Society and Economics	5. The Servile Society.	The notion of a "new ethic" of commerce in which the business owner issues orders of work to his henchmen workers, while both operate together as one cell of an organic economy. The power of these cell is counterbalanced by public factors such as Labor Trustees and appointed (national) socialist party organizers.
Chapter VIII. Nation and Race	1. The Creed of Nationalism.
Chapter VIII. Nation and Race	2. The Sacrament of War.
Chapter VIII. Nation and Race	3. The Ethnic Idol.
Chapter VIII. Nation and Race	4. The Secret of Race.
Chapter VIII. Nation and Race	5. Racial Purity.
Chapter VIII. Nation and Race	6. Racial Hierarchy.
Chapter VIII. Nation and Race	7. Breeding the Nation.
Chapter VIII. Nation and Race	8. The Meaning of Anti-Judaism.
Chapter IX. The German Claim	1. The Category of "Germanhood".
Chapter IX. The German Claim	2. The Prussian Drive.
Chapter IX. The German Claim	3. The Central Nation.
Chapter IX. The German Claim	4. Fighting Rome and the West.
Chapter IX. The German Claim	5. The "Master Race".
Chapter IX. The German Claim	6. Nation or Empire.
Chapter IX. The German Claim	7. The Road to Hegemony.
Conclusion. Nazi Germany and the Western World	1. The Failure of the West.
Conclusion. Nazi Germany and the Western World	2. The Fields of Resistance: (a) Facts. (b) Perspectives.
Conclusion. Nazi Germany and the Western World	3. The Soul of the West.
	Bibliography
	Index
