= Criticism of the Catholic Church =

During its long history, the Catholic Church has been subject to criticism regarding various beliefs and practices. Within the church, this often involves opposition or support for practices associated with traditionalist Catholicism. In the past, different interpretations of scripture and various other critiques contributed to schisms such as the schism with the Eastern Orthodox Church and the Protestant Reformation. The Catholic Church has also been criticized for some of its historical actions, such as the church's promotion of the Crusades, and at various times by nationalist groups who feared the influence of Catholicism in undermining their regime. Furthermore, the Catholic Church has been criticized for not practicing ordination of women to the priesthood, its handling of incidents of sexual abuse, its involvement with various dictatorial regimes, and various inter-faith interactions.

This article talks about both the self-criticism of the Catholic Church by people who identify themselves as Catholic, and the cross-criticism of people from other denominations of Christianity, other religions, atheism, agnosticism or even indifference.

== Internal ==
=== Liturgical reforms ===
Since 1970, the Mass has predominantly been celebrated in the vernacular, following the liturgical reforms of the Second Vatican Council. While this shift included a transition away from Latin, critiques of the Novus Ordo Missae go beyond language and concern the very structure and theology of the rite. Traditionalists argue that the Novus Ordo represents a rupture with the Church's liturgical tradition, particularly in its simplified rubrics, shift away from ad orientem worship, reduced emphasis on the sacrificial nature of the Mass, and incorporation of elements influenced by Protestant worship.

In 2007, Pope Benedict XVI issued Summorum Pontificum, loosening restrictions on the celebration of the Tridentine Mass, affirming that it had never been abrogated and could be freely celebrated by any priest. This was intended to address concerns over liturgical discontinuity and to foster reconciliation with those attached to the preconciliar rite. However, in 2021, Pope Francis promulgated Traditionis Custodes, severely restricting the use of the Tridentine Mass, arguing that its widespread use had led to division rather than unity within the Church.

=== Ecumenical Concerns ===
Traditionalist Catholics have expressed concerns about the Catholic Church's approach to ecumenism following the Second Vatican Council, arguing that it represents a departure from previous Church teaching on the uniqueness of Catholicism. These critiques focus on perceived changes in doctrine, liturgy, and interfaith relations.

Traditionalists argue that post-conciliar ecumenism fosters religious indifferentism, suggesting that all religions are equally valid paths to salvation, which they see as conflicting with the doctrine of extra Ecclesiam nulla salus ("outside the Church there is no salvation"). They also criticize the Church's increased participation in interfaith dialogue and joint prayer services, particularly high-profile events such as the Assisi Meetings initiated by Pope John Paul II, which they claim create the impression of equality between Catholicism and other religions.

Another major concern is the perceived Protestantization of Catholic worship, particularly within the Novus Ordo Missae, which Traditionalists argue introduced elements that align with Protestant theology, diminishing the distinctiveness of Catholic sacramental doctrine. Additionally, some Traditionalists view the Church's revised stance toward Judaism, as reflected in documents such as Nostra Aetate (1965), as a significant departure from prior teachings.

Critics also argue that the emphasis on ecumenism has led to a weakening of Catholic missionary activity, shifting the focus from conversion to dialogue, which they see as contradicting the Church's historic evangelistic mission. These concerns have led some Traditionalists to reject certain Vatican II documents and subsequent papal initiatives, viewing them as a rupture with the Church's prior teachings on the necessity of Catholicism for salvation.

=== Ordination of women ===
The teaching of the Catholic Church on ordination, as expressed in the Code of Canon Law, the Catechism of the Catholic Church, and the apostolic letter Ordinatio sacerdotalis, is that "only a baptized man validly receives sacred ordination". According to Roman Catholic thinking, the priest is acting 'in persona Christi' (that is, in the Person of Christ). In 1979, Sister Theresa Kane, then president of the Leadership Conference of Women Religious, challenged Pope John Paul II from the podium at the National Shrine of the Immaculate Conception in Washington, D.C., to include women "in all ministries of our Church". In his Apostolic Letter Ordinatio sacerdotalis (1994), Pope John Paul II said the "Priestly ordination, … has in the Catholic Church from the beginning always been reserved to men alone." He cited the Congregation for the Doctrine of the Faith (under Pope Paul VI) Declaration Inter Insigniores on the question of the Admission of Women to the Ministerial Priesthood, and declared that "the Church has no authority whatsoever to confer priestly ordination on women and that this judgment is to be definitively held by all the Church's faithful." The reasons given included: "the example recorded in the Sacred Scriptures of Christ choosing his Apostles only from among men; the constant practice of the Church, which has imitated Christ in choosing only men; and her living teaching authority which has consistently held that the exclusion of women from the priesthood is in accordance with God's plan for his Church."

Several Catholic groups, nonetheless, say the matter should still be open for discussion, and dissenters do not regard Ordinatio sacerdotalis as definitive church teaching. But in June 2018 Pope Francis said, "We cannot do this with Holy Orders (women priests) because dogmatically we cannot. Pope John Paul II was clear and closed the door and I'm not going to go back on that. It [John Paul's decision] was serious, it was not a capricious thing." But from the start of his papacy Francis has pointed out that "sacramental power is too closely identified with power in general. It must be remembered that when we speak of sacramental power "we are in the realm of function, not that of dignity or holiness'" (EG 104). Nevertheless, since the Second Vatican Council, women have taken an increased role in the church. In 1994, the Vatican Congregation for Divine Worship and the Discipline of the Sacraments formally interpreted the 1983 Code of Canon Law, stating that women could assist at Mass as acolytes or altar servers. Women also serve as lectors and extraordinary ministers. Critics see the church's position on the ordination of women as a sign that women are not equal to men in the Catholic Church, though the church rejects this inference. Pope Francis organized a Study Commission on the Women's Diaconate to review and study the history of women's service to the church, such as that of deaconesses. The Commission submitted its report to Pope Francis in January 2019.

=== Finances ===
Concerns about usury included the 19th-century Rothschild loans to the Holy See and 16th-century objections over abuse of the zinskauf clause. This was particularly problematic because the charging of interest (all interest, not just excessive interest) was a violation of doctrine at the time, such as that reflected in the 1745 encyclical Vix pervenit. As a result, work-arounds were employed. For example, in the 15th century, the Medici Bank lent money to the Vatican which was lax about repayment. Rather than charging interest, "the Medici overcharged the pope on the silks and brocades, the jewels and other commodities they supplied." However, the 1917 Code of Canon Law switched position and allowed church monies to be used to accrue interest.

Italian priest Pino Puglisi refused money from Mafia members when offered it for the traditional feast day celebrations, and also resisted the Mafia in other ways, for which he was martyred in 1993.

In 2014, Pope Francis criticized the practice of charging altarage fees or honorariums for things like baptisms, blessings, and Mass intentions (such as Masses for the dead).

In 2018, Pope Francis criticized the selling of Masses for the dead, stating, "the Mass is not paid for, redemption is free, if I want to make an offering, well and good, but Mass is free."

== Interfaith ==
=== Judaism ===
In the Middle Ages, religion played a major role in driving antisemitism. Adversus Judaeos ("against the Jews") are a series of fourth century homilies by John Chrysostom directed to members of the church of Antioch of his time, which continued to observe Jewish feasts and fasts. Critical of this, he cast Judaism and the synagogues in his city in a critical and negative light. The use of hyperbole and other rhetorical devices painted a harsh and negative picture of the Jews. This was largely ignored until the Jewish anti-Christian teachings began to surface in Muslim Andalusia in the 11th and 12th centuries. According to historian William I. Brustein, his sermons against Jews gave further momentum to the idea that Jews are collectively responsible for the death of Jesus. "Over the course of time, Christians began to accept ... that the Jewish people as a whole were responsible for killing Jesus. According to this interpretation, both the Jews present at Jesus' death and the Jewish people collectively and for all time, have committed the sin of deicide, or God-killing. For 1900 years of Christian-Jewish history, the charge of deicide has led to hatred, violence against and murder of Jews in Europe and America."

In 1998, Pope John Paul II apologized for the failure of Catholics to help Jews during the Holocaust and acknowledged that Christian antisemitism might have made easier Nazi persecution of the Jews, whom the Pope called "our elder brothers" in the faith.

The 2007 motu proprio Summorum Pontificum, allowing a wider use of the Tridentine Mass, raised concerns in the Jewish community regarding the Good Friday liturgy which contained a prayer "For the conversion of the Jews" referring to Jewish "blindness" and prays for them to be "delivered from their darkness." The American Jewish Committee said that this raises "negative implications that some in the Jewish community and beyond have drawn concerning the motu proprio." Pope Benedict XVI in 2008 replaced the prayer in the 1962 Missal with a newly composed prayer that makes no mention of blindness or darkness.

=== Russian Orthodoxy ===
In 2007, the then Eastern Orthodox Patriarch Alexei II of Moscow objected to what he termed "proselytizing" by clerics of the Eastern Rite of the Catholic Church. Catholic officials replied that their efforts in Russia were not aimed at Eastern Orthodox believers, but were reaching out to the vast majority of Russians who are not churchgoers. The Congregation for the Doctrine of the Faith rejected the characterization of "proselytizing" and said that respect towards non-Catholic Christians must not negate the possibility of conversion, if an individual should so choose.

=== Protestantism ===
Common factors that played a role during the Reformation and the Counter-Reformation included the rise of nationalism, simony, the appointment of Cardinal-nephews, the sale of indulgences, and other corruption in the Roman Curia and other ecclesiastical hierarchy, as well as the impact of humanism, the new learning of the Renaissance, the epistemological shift between the schola moderna and schola antiqua within scholasticism, and the Western Schism that eroded loyalty to the Papacy.

Key events of the period include Martin Luther nailing the 95 theses (1517), the Council of Trent (1545–1563), the excommunication of Elizabeth I (1570), the Battle of Lepanto (1571), the adoption of the Gregorian calendar under Pope Gregory XIII, the French Wars of Religion, the Long Turkish War, the final phases of the Thirty Years' War (1618–1648), and the formation of the last Holy League by Innocent XI during the Great Turkish War.

Protestants hold doctrinal differences with the Catholic Church in a number of areas, including the understanding of the meaning of the word "faith" and how it relates to "good works" in terms of salvation, and a difference of opinion regarding the concept of "justification"; also regarding the Catholic Church's belief in sacred tradition as a source of revelation complementary to sacred scripture. Some scholars of Early Christianity are adherents of the New Perspective on Paul and so believe sola fide is a misinterpretation and that Paul was actually speaking about laws (such as circumcision, dietary laws, Sabbath, temple rituals, etc.) that were considered essential for the Jews of the time.

=== Islam ===
In September 2006, Pope Benedict XVI delivered the Regensburg lecture at the University of Regensburg in Germany, where he had once served as a professor of theology. It was entitled "Faith, Reason and the University – Memories and Reflections". In his lecture, the Pope, speaking in German, quoted a passage about Islam made at the end of the 14th century by Byzantine (Eastern Roman) emperor Manuel II Palaiologos. As the English translation of the Pope's lecture was disseminated across the world, the quotation was taken out of context and many Islamic politicians and religious leaders protested against what they saw as an insulting mischaracterization of Islam. Mass street protests were mounted in many Islamic countries. The Pope maintained that the comment he had quoted did not reflect his own views.

=== Buddhism ===
In 1994, Pope John Paul II wrote Crossing the Threshold of Hope, in which he discussed various non-Christian religions, including Buddhism. The book prompted widespread criticism from the Buddhist community, and the pope's statements were characterized as misunderstanding and offending Buddhism. Thinley Norbu Rinpoche, a Tibetan Buddhist lama, wrote a book to address the "serious, gratuitous misrepresentations of Buddhist doctrine which seemed to be based on misunderstandings" contained within Crossing the Threshold of Hope. Bhikkhu Bodhi, a Theravada Buddhism scholar, published an essay "intended as a short corrective to the Pope's demeaning characterization of Buddhism" entitled Toward a Threshold of Understanding.

== Historical ==
=== Response to heresy ===
The development of doctrine, the position of orthodoxy, and the relationship between the early Church and early heretical groups is a matter of academic debate. Before the 12th century, Christianity gradually suppressed what it saw as heresy, usually through a system of ecclesiastical sanctions, excommunication, and anathema. Later, an accusation of heresy could be construed as treason against lawful civil rule, and therefore punishable by civil sanctions such as confiscation of property, imprisonment, or death, though the latter was not frequently imposed, as this form of punishment had many ecclesiastical opponents. Within five years of the official 'criminalization' of heresy by the emperor, the first Christian heretic, Priscillian, was executed in 385 by Roman officials. For some years after the Protestant Reformation, Protestant denominations were also known to execute those whom they considered heretics.

When John Paul II visited Prague in the 1990s, he apologized for the execution of Jan Hus on charges of heresy and requested experts in this matter "to define with greater clarity the position held by Jan Hus among the Church's reformers", and acknowledged that "independently of the theological convictions he defended, Hus cannot be denied integrity in his personal life and commitment to the nation's moral education."

In 2015, after visiting a Waldensian Temple in Turin, Pope Francis, in the name of the Catholic Church, asked Waldensian Christians for forgiveness for their persecution. The Pope apologized for the church's "un-Christian and even inhumane positions and actions".

=== Crusades ===
The Crusades were a series of military conflicts, with a religious as well as a socio-political character, waged against external and internal threats by much of Christian Europe. The Crusades were waged against Muslims, Slavs, Mongols, Cathars, Hussites and political enemies of the popes. The Crusaders made vows and were granted an indulgence.

Elements of the Crusades were criticized by some from the time of their inception in 1095. Roger Bacon believed that the Crusades were counter-productive because, "those who survive, together with their children, are more and more embittered against the Christian faith." In spite of some criticism, the movement was still widely supported in Europe long after the fall of Acre in 1291. After that event, the Crusades to recover Jerusalem and the Christian East were unsuccessful. Eighteenth-century rationalists harshly criticized the Crusaders. In the 1950s, Sir Steven Runciman published a highly critical account of the Crusades in which he referred to the practice of Holy War as "a sin against the Holy Ghost".

=== Nationalist critique ===
As early as the second century, Justin Martyr addressed his First Apology to the Roman Emperor Antoninus Pius in order to convince him that Christians could be good citizens. In addition to arguing against the persecution of individuals solely because they were Christians, Justin also provided the Emperor with a defense of the philosophy of Christianity along with a detailed description of contemporary Christian practices and rituals. In many instances concern regarding the loyalty of Catholics arose in the context of perceived political threats. In 1570, Pope Pius V issued a papal bull titled Regnans in Excelsis, which declared Elizabeth I to be excommunicated and a heretic. Concerned at the possibility that, in the event of an attack by the Catholic monarchs of France and Spain, English Catholics might side with the invaders, Parliament enacted restrictive legislation against Catholics. The initial favorable reception of Jesuits in Japan changed when Toyotomi Hideyoshi became disturbed by the external threats posed by the expansion of European power in East Asia. Hideyoshi was apprehensive that Portugal and Spain might provide military support to Dom Justo Takayama, a Christian daimyō in western Japan. The San Felipe incident (1596) involved the Spanish captain of a shipwrecked trading vessel, who, in an attempt to recover his cargo, made the claim that the missionaries (many of whom had arrived with the Portuguese) were there to prepare Japan for conquest. Hideyoshi was concerned that divided loyalties might lead to dangerous rebels like the Ikkō-ikki Sect of earlier years and issued an edict expelling missionaries.

The Reichskonkordat of 1933 was an agreement between the Holy See and Germany, negotiated by Cardinal Secretary of State Eugenio Pacelli (later Pope Pius XII) and Vice Chancellor Franz von Papen on behalf of President Paul von Hindenburg. While the treaty preserved the church's ecclesiastical and educational institutions, and guaranteed the right to pastoral care in hospitals, prisons and similar institutions, it also required all clergy to abstain from membership in political parties, and not support political causes. Hitler routinely disregarded the concordat and permitted a persecution of the Catholic Church in Germany. Shortly before the 20 July signing of the Reichskonkordat, Germany signed similar agreements with the state Protestant churches in Germany, although the Confessing Church opposed the regime. Nazi breaches of the agreement began almost as soon as it had been signed and intensified afterwards leading to protest from the church including in the 1937 encyclical Mit brennender Sorge of Pope Pius XI, followed in 1943 by Mystici corporis Christi of Pope Pius XII which condemned forced conversions, the murder of disabled people, and the exclusion of people on the basis of race or nationality. The Nazis planned to eliminate the church's influence by restricting its organizations to purely religious activities.

In a series of sermons in the summer of 1941, Clemens August Graf von Galen, Bishop of Munster, denounced the Nazi regime for its Gestapo tactics and policies, including euthanasia, and attacked the Third Reich for undermining justice. He stated: "As a German, as a decent citizen, I demand justice". In the view of SS General Jürgen Stroop, German patriotism "was tainted by Papist ideals, which have been harmful to Germany for centuries. Besides, the Archbishop's [Clemens August Graf von Galen] orders came from outside the Fatherland, a fact which disturbed us. We all know that despite its diverse factions, the Catholic Church is a world community, which sticks together when the chips are down." "There is no doubt that in the long run Nazi leaders such as Hitler and Himmler intended to eradicate Christianity just as ruthlessly as any other rival ideology, even if in the short term they had to be content to make compromises with it."

Catholic clergy have been implicated in the violent repression by the Ustaše regime in Croatia during the Second World War.

=== Sexual abuse scandals ===
In January 2002, cases in which priests were accused of sexually abusing children were widely reported by the news media. A survey of the ten largest U.S. dioceses found that 234 priests, out of a total of 25,616 priests in those dioceses, have been accused of sexually abusing children in the last 50 years. The report does not state how many of these allegations have been proven true in courts. Victims of such abuse filed lawsuits against a number of dioceses, resulting in multi-million dollar settlements in some cases. In response, in June 2002, the United States Conference of Catholic Bishops initiated strict new guidelines ("zero tolerance") for the protection of children and youth in Catholic institutions across the country. In February 2019, the Catholic Church held a worldwide summit of bishops in Rome to discuss the steps that can be taken to prevent the sexual abuse of children and vulnerable adults.

A January 2003 review by The New York Times counted 1,205 allegedly abusive priests nationwide over five decades, based on court records and media reports.

=== Canadian Indigenous residential schools ===
The Indian residential school system in Canada was a network of boarding schools for indigenous peoples. Children were removed from their parents' homes, often forcibly, and sent to the schools. In 2015, the Truth and Reconciliation Commission estimated that more than 4000 students have died due to this system. About 60% of the Canadian Indian residential schools were operated by the Catholic church under federal and provincial government sponsorship and funding. The commission says that students died due to lack of facilities, disease, suicide, and abuse at the hands of those operating the schools.

== See also ==
- Anti-Catholicism
- Anti-clericalism
- Anti-Papalism
- Catholic theology
  - Sacraments of the Catholic Church
- Catholic Church sexual abuse cases
- Clergy removed from office
- Criticism of the Catholic Church
- Critics of the Catholic Church - list of topics
- History of the Catholic Church
- Catholic Church and Nazi Germany
- Nazi views on Catholicism
- Traditionalist Catholicism
  - Sedevacantism
