= Victims of Nazi Germany =

Nazi Germany discriminated against and persecuted people on the basis of their race or ethnicity (actual or perceived), religious affiliation, political beliefs, sexual orientation, and so-called hereditary illness. Discrimination was institutionalized through legislation under the Nazi Party and perpetrated at an industrial scale, culminating in the Holocaust.

The vast majority of the Nazi regime's victims were Jewish, Slavic, or Romani. Jews, along with some Romani populations, were deemed unfit for society on racial or ethnic grounds and largely confined to ghettos, then rounded up and deported to concentration or extermination camps. The Slavic populations of Eastern Europe were deemed an inferior race that needed to be destroyed in order to secure Lebensraum for the German "Aryan race". The beginning of World War II marked a colossal escalation in the Nazis' efforts to eliminate "inferior" communities across German-occupied Europe, with methods including: non-judicial incarceration, confiscation of property, forced labour (and extermination through hard labour), sexual slavery, human experimentation, malnourishment, and execution by death squads. For Jews, in particular, the Nazis' goal was total extermination—the genocide of the Jewish people, first in Europe and eventually in other parts of the world. This was presented by Adolf Hitler as the "Final Solution" to the Jewish question.

According to Alex J. Kay, the groups subjected to mass killing by Nazi Germany, on the order of tens of thousands of victims or more, were 300,000 disabled people, as many as 100,000 Polish elites, nearly six million European Jews, 200,000 Romani people, at least 2 million Soviet urban residents targeted by the hunger policy, nearly 3.3 million Soviet prisoners of war, about 1 million rural inhabitants during anti-partisan warfare (excluding actual partisans), and 185,000 Polish civilians killed during and after the Warsaw Uprising. The total number of deaths from mass killing would thus amount to at least 13 million. Kay argues that all these groups, including Jews, "were regarded by the Nazi regime in one way or another as a potential threat" to Germany's war effort. However, viewing them as a threat was informed by Nazi racial theory, making it hard to separate racist versus strategic reasons for killing. Nazi policies in the occupied eastern territories resulted in the deaths of tens of millions of people, especially during Germany's invasion of the Soviet Union, which began in 1941 and opened up the Eastern Front, where 35% to 45% of all World War II casualties occurred.

== Scope of usage ==
While the term Holocaust generally refers to the systematic mass-murder of the Jewish people in German-occupied Europe, (Note: Bartov 2023a, pp. 18–19: "Much of this debate curiously boils down to a very specific historical question, namely, did the Nazis target the Jews for genocide in a manner that was essentially different from their treatment of any other group under their rule? ... There can be little doubt that the Jews played a singular role in the Nazi imaginaire and that German Jewish policies distinguished them within the Nazi universe of murder and fantasy; but other groups clearly have been similarly targeted in other genocides ... 'the extent of the 'final solution' was ... shaped by an antisemitism that was colored by a different element over and above the racism and ethno-nationalism that explains the murder of other groups by Nazi Germany—that element being the view of 'the Jews' as an implacable, collective world enemy.' To be sure, this makes the Holocaust unique only within the context of the Nazi empire ...." Smith 2023, p. 36: "The Holocaust is particular to Jews and yet has had increasing relevance for those who do not identify as Jewish. ... All Jews everywhere were to be murdered because of their racial heritage was 'put into state policy' on January 20, 1942 at the Wannsee conference.... Witness to the genocide of the Jews is a uniquely Jewish experience, because only Jews were targeted by that policy, even if other groups were targeted for genocide under other policies. The Nazi regime committed genocide against the Roma and Sinti, governed by separate policies. They also committed war crimes against Soviet Prisoners of War under other policies. So too the mass murder of disabled and the mentally ill had their own policies. The Nazis committed multiple genocides and crimes against humanity, at the same time, sometimes in the same place, governed by different laws, policies, and practices. It is not correct to say that there were many victim types during 'the Holocaust,' if by 'the Holocaust' we mean the genocide of the Jews." Stone 2023, "Introduction: What is the Holocaust?": "This is why the focus here is on the Jews. Roma, the disabled, Soviet POWs, homosexuals and other groups were victims of the Nazis, and it is entirely legitimate to study their fate alongside one another. But using the term 'Holocaust' to encompass all of these groups with the aim of being inclusive and not prioritizing one group's suffering, actually does a disservice to groups other than Jews. For the Nazis persecuted these groups for different reasons, reasons we fail to appreciate if we collapse them all together." Engel 2021, pp. 3, 5: "This book is about an encounter between two sets of human beings: on one hand, the people who acted on behalf of the German state, its agencies, or its almost 66 million citizens between 30 January 1933 and 8 May 1945; on the other, the more than 9 million Jews ...." And: "Those discoveries about the encounter between the Third Reich and the Jews made that encounter stand out in the minds of many from other instances of Nazi persecution and encouraged observers to assign it its own special name." Jackson 2021, pp. 199–200: "The Nazis killed some people almost exclusively due to their supposed genetic inferiority (the mentally and physically handicapped, Slavs, Roma); they killed others almost exclusively due to their perceived cultural decadence (communists, democrats, modernist authors and artists); but only the Jews were indicted on both grounds simultaneously and with equal vigor. ... This is not to say that Roma, communists, and others were not hated and murdered by the Nazis, but it is to note that the Jews were unique in being despised and assaulted in every dimension of their identity, corporeal and psychic." Sahlstrom 2021, p. 291: "the established understanding of the Holocaust today as the genocide of six million Jews". Bartrop 2019, p. 50: "it must always be remembered that the Holocaust was a premeditated action by the Nazis to permanently eradicate a Jewish presence in Europe. Others—the disabled, Roma, Poles and other Slavs, Jehovah's Witnesses, homosexuals, dissenting clergy, communists, socialists, 'asocials,' and political opponents of all sorts—were also persecuted and in many cases murdered in huge numbers; however, it was the campaign against the Jews that was the ideological 'ground zero' for Nazi racial ideology. Others besides Jews were murdered, often on a genocidal scale, and should be remembered and acknowledged: but it was only the Jews who were all to be killed as part of a calculated policy of genocide." Beorn 2018, p. 4: "I will use the term 'Holocaust' to refer mainly to the Nazi attempt to murder the Jews of Europe; however, I will also use the more inclusive term 'Nazi genocidal project' to capture the larger murderous vision of which the Jews were such a large part. This includes Sinti/Roma (gypsies), the handicapped, political 'enemies,' Soviet prisoners of war, and—particularly in the East—entire ethnic groups such as the Slavs. One cannot understand the Holocaust in Eastern Europe without placing it in the context of this larger Nazi genocidal project that foresaw murder and demographic engineering on a colossal scale." Cesarani 2016, p. xxxix: "This book deals with the fate of the Jews, not of 'other victims' of Nazi political repression and racial-biological policies. Several other groups endured social exclusion, incarceration in concentration camps, and mass murder. However, the rationale for the persecution of these groups differed radically from the intentions that underlay anti-Jewish policy. Even though homosexual men and women, Germans of African descent, and the severely mentally and physically disabled were all disparaged in Nazi racial thinking, and depicted as a threat to the strength and purity of the Volk, only the Jews were characterized as an implacable, powerful, global enemy that had to be fought at every turn and finally eliminated." Hayes 2015, p. xiii: "This book also reflects another of its editor's convictions: the Holocaust was National Socialist Germany's assault on the Jews of Europe. Nazism attacked many groups, but none for the same reason that it attacked the Jews, none with the same urgency, and none to the same extent." Hayes & Roth 2010, p. 2: "Other groups—for example, Sinti and Roma, homosexuals, and Slavs—were swept up in the maelstrom of the Holocaust, but not for the same reasons as Jews and not with the same consequences .... In none of these cases, however, was the target group considered dangerous or coherent enough to warrant complete or immediate extirpation. This circumstance constitutes a significant difference from policies pursued toward the Jews, a difference that helps to clarify and define the Holocaust itself." Stone 2010, pp. 1–2: "For the purpose of this book, the Holocaust is understood as the genocide of the Jews .... 'Holocaust', then, refers to the genocide of the Jews, which by no means excludes an understanding that other groups—notably Romanies and Slavs—were victims of genocide." Bloxham 2009, p. 1: "Between 5,100,000 and 6,200,000 Jews were murdered during the Second World War, an episode the Nazis called the 'final solution of the Jewish question'. The world today knows it as the Holocaust." Niewyk & Nicosia 2000, pp. 45, 51: "The Holocaust is commonly defined as the mass murder of more than 5,000,000 Jews by the Germans during World War II. Not everyone finds this a fully satisfactory definition." And: "the traditional view that it was the genocide of the Jews alone") the Nazis also murdered a large number of non-Jewish people who were also considered subhuman (Untermenschen) or undesirable. (Note: King 2023, pp. 26–27: "Rather than one big thing, the Holocaust might now be described as an array of event categories. In Christopher Browning's terms, the Holocaust involved three separate "clusters of genocidal projects": euthanasia and "racial purification" directed against the disabled and Sinti and Roma (at the time referred to collectively as "Gypsies") within the Third Reich; the eradication of Slavic populations living in countries east of Germany; and the Final Solution proper—that is, the attempted mass murder of every Jew residing anywhere within Germany's sphere of influence (Browning 2010, 407). (The list of persecuted categories—people targeted by the Nazis in ways short of genocide—would of course be longer.)" Engel 2021, p. 6: "Echoing this view, some have contended that the expression 'the Holocaust' ought to refer not only to the encounter between the Third Reich and the Jews but also to 'the horrors that Poles, other Slavs, and Gypsies endured at the hands of the Nazis' (Lukas, 1986: 220). Others have extended the term to encompass the Third Reich's treatment of homosexuals, the mentally ill or infrm, and Jehovah's Witnesses, speaking of 11 or 12 million victims of the Holocaust, half of whom were Jews. Still others have employed the word 'holocaust' also when referring to cases of mass murder not perpetrated by the Third Reich." Kay 2021, pp. 1–2: "For perhaps the first time, all major victim groups where the death tolls reached at least into the tens of thousands will be considered together: Jewish and non-Jewish .... [I]t makes a great deal of sense to consider the different strands of Nazi mass killing together rather than in isolation from one another. This of course means going against the grain of most scholarship on the subject by examining the genocide of the European Jews alongside other Nazi mass-murder campaigns." Gerlach 2016, pp. 14–15: "There are a number of words I will try to avoid because of the serious misconceptions they might lead to. The terms Holocaust and Shoah are not useful since neither has any analytical value. 'Holocaust' (derived from the Greek holókauton, or 'burned sacrifice') has a religious connotation unbefitting of the event it is supposed to refer to, and users of this term may mean by it either the persecution and murder of Jews alone, or Nazi German violence against any group more generally .... Importantly, Holocaust and Shoah have also been criticized as 'teleological and anachronistic' terms that convey a retrospective view that makes complex processes appear 'as a single event.'" Niewyk & Nicosia 2000, p. 51: "The authors of this volume have adopted the third approach to a working definition: The Holocaust—that is, Nazi genocide—was the systematic, state-sponsored murder of entire groups determined by heredity. This applied to Jews, Gypsies, and the handicapped. This section also makes it clear that other definitions are defended by scholars who deserve a respectful hearing.") Some victims belonged to several categories targeted for persecution, e.g. an assimilated Jew who was a member of a communist party or someone of Jewish ancestry who identified as a Jehovah's Witness.

Non-Jewish victims of Nazism included Slavs (e.g. Russians, Belarusians, Poles, Ukrainians and Serbs), the Romani (gypsies), LGBT people; (Note: See Persecution of homosexuals in Nazi Germany and Lesbians in Nazi Germany) mentally or physically disabled people; (Note: See Action T4) Soviet POWs, Roman Catholics, Jehovah's Witnesses, Spanish Republicans, Freemasons, (Note: See also Judeo-Masonic conspiracy theory) people of color (especially the Afro-German Mischlinge, called "Rhineland bastards" by Hitler and the Nazi regime), and other minorities not considered Aryan (Herrenvolk, or part of the "master race"); (Note: See Nazism and race) leftists, communists, trade unionists, social democrats, socialists, anarchists, and other dissidents.

Taking into account all of the victims of persecution, the Nazis systematically murdered an estimated six million Jews and millions of others during the war. Donald Niewyk suggests that the broadest definition, including Soviet civilian deaths, would produce a total of 17 million victims.

Despite widely varying treatment (some groups were actively targeted for genocide while others were not), some died in concentration camps such as Dachau and others from various forms of Nazi brutality. According to extensive documentation (written and photographic) left by the Nazis, eyewitness testimony by survivors, perpetrators and bystanders, and records of the occupied countries, most perished in death camps such as Auschwitz-Birkenau.

== Racial/ethnic or national groups ==
=== Jews ===
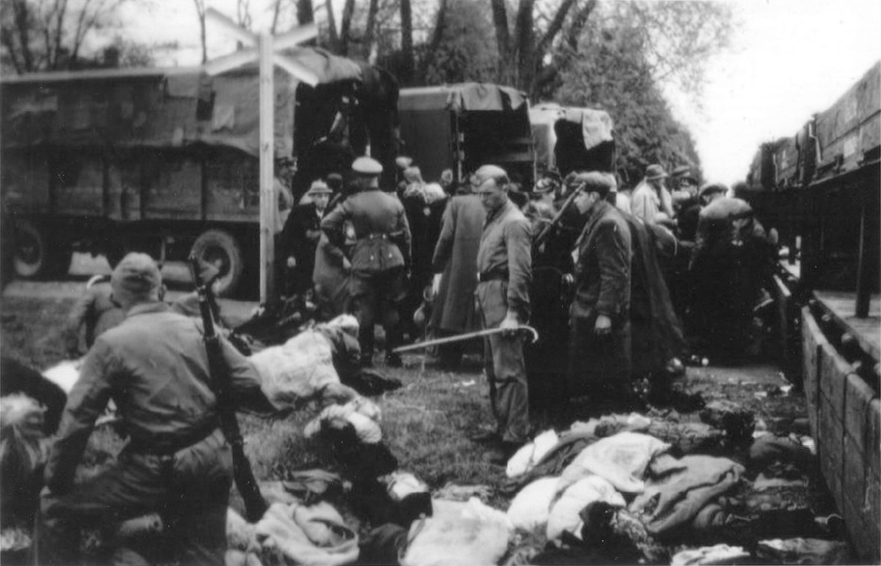
Jews delivered to Chełmno death camp were forced to abandon their bundles along the way. In this photo, loading of victims sent from the ghetto in Łódź in 1942.

The military campaign to displace persons like the Jews from Germany and other German-held territories during World War II, often with extreme brutality, is known as the Holocaust. It was carried out primarily by German forces and collaborators, German and non-German. Early in the war, millions of Jews were concentrated in urban ghettos. In 1941, Jews were massacred, and by December, Hitler had decided to exterminate all Jews living in Europe at that time. The European Jewish population was reduced from 9,740,000 to 3,642,000; the world's Jewish population was reduced by one-third, from roughly 16.6 million in 1939 to about 11 million in 1946. The extermination of Jews had been a priority to the Nazis, regardless of the consequences.

In January 1942, during the Wannsee Conference, several Nazi leaders discussed the details of the "Final Solution to the Jewish Question" (Endlösung der Judenfrage) and German State Secretary Josef Bühler urged conference chairman Reinhard Heydrich to proceed with the Final Solution in the General Government. Jewish populations were systematically deported from the ghettos and the occupied territories to the seven camps designated as Vernichtungslager (extermination camps):

- Auschwitz-Birkenau
- Belzec
- Chelmno
- Majdanek
- Maly Trostenets
- Sobibór
- Treblinka

In 1978, Sebastian Haffner wrote that in December 1941, Hitler began to accept the failure of his primary goal—to dominate Europe, after his declaration of war against the United States, and his withdrawal—was compensated for by his secondary goal: the extermination of the Jews. As the Nazi war machine faltered during the war's final years, military resources such as fuel, transport, munitions, soldiers and industrial resources were still diverted from the fronts to the death camps.

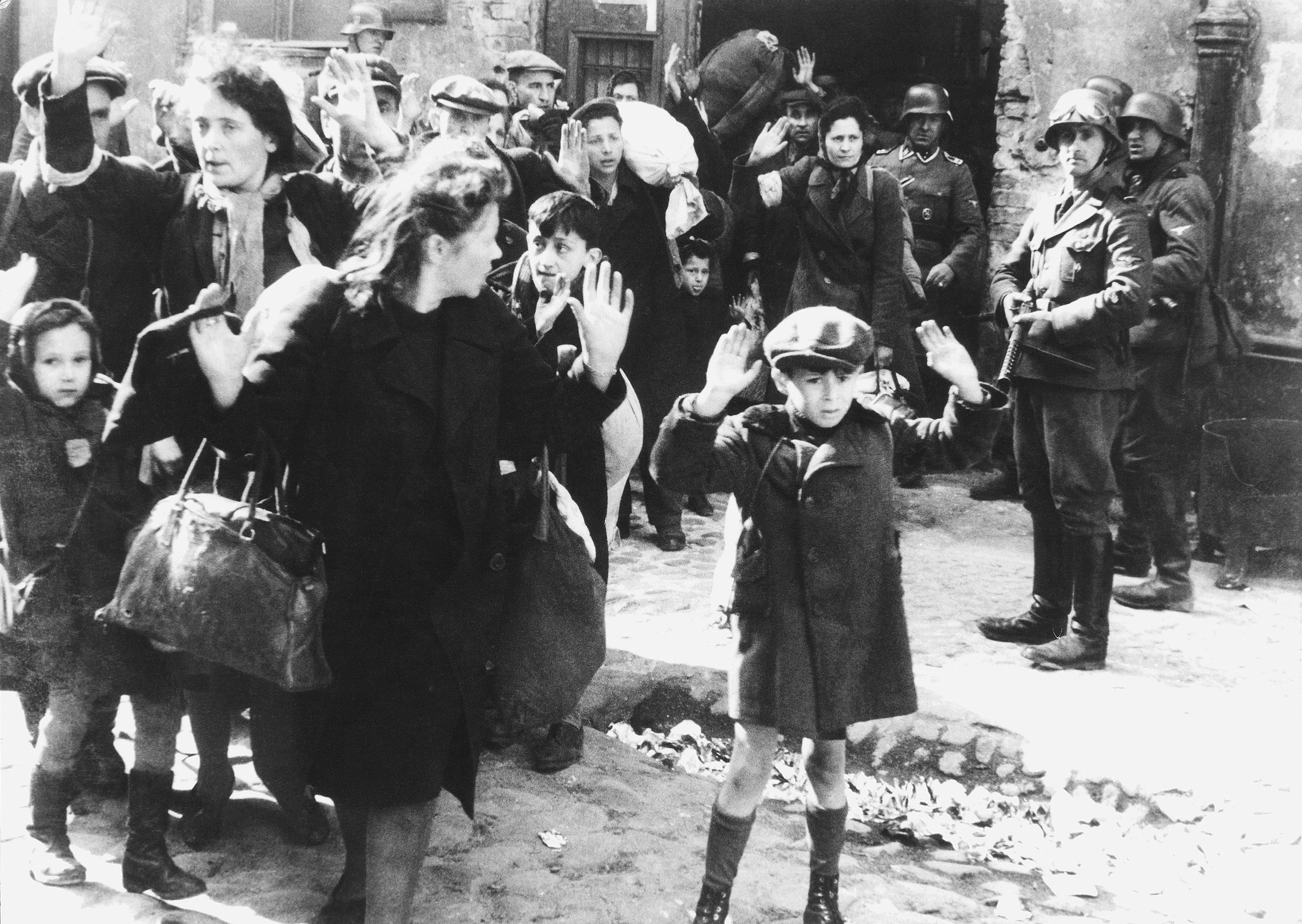
Polish Jews captured by Germans during the Warsaw Ghetto Uprising, May 1943

In Poland – home of Europe's largest Jewish community before the war – the Nazis murdered 3 million Jews, about 90 percent of its Jewish population. Although reports of the Holocaust had reached Western leaders, public awareness in the United States and other democracies of the mass murder of Jews in Poland was low at the time; the first references in The New York Times, in 1942, were unconfirmed reports rather than front-page news.

Greece, Yugoslavia, Hungary, Lithuania, Bohemia, the Netherlands, Slovakia and Latvia lost over 70 percent of their Jewish populations; in Belgium, Romania, Luxembourg, Norway, and Estonia, the figure was about 50 percent. Over one-third of the Soviet Union's Jews were murdered; France lost about 25 percent of its Jewish population, Italy between 15% and 20%. Denmark evacuated nearly all of its Jews to nearby neutral Sweden; the Danish resistance movement, with the assistance of many Danish citizens, evacuated 7,220 of the country's 7,800 Jews by sea to Sweden, in vessels ranging from fishing boats to private yachts. The rescue allowed the vast majority of Denmark's Jewish population to avoid capture by the Nazis. Jews outside Europe under Axis occupation were also affected by the Holocaust in Italian Libya, Algeria, Tunisia, Morocco, Iraq, Japan, and China.

Although Jews are an ethnoreligious group, they were defined by the Nazis on purely racial grounds. The Nazi Party viewed the Jewish religion as irrelevant, persecuting Jews in accordance with antisemitic stereotypes of an alleged biologically determined heritage. Defining Jews as the chief enemy, Nazi racial ideology was also used to persecute other minorities.

The Yad Vashem museum has created, in an ongoing collaboration with many partners, a database with 7.5 million personal records on Jews murdered by the Nazis and their accomplices during the Holocaust, as well as those whose fate has yet to be determined. Some people appear in multiple records, and it is estimated that 5 million murdered Jews have been commemorated. The names of more than one million victims remain unknown and are still being collected.

=== Slavs ===
Slavs were one of the most widely persecuted groups during the war, with many Poles, Belarusians, Russians, Ukrainians, Slovenes, Serbs and others killed by the Nazis, who deemed them racially inferior. According to Bohdan Wytwycky, an estimated 3 million Ukrainians and 1.5 million Belarusians were killed by the Nazis for racially-motivated reasons. The Nazis' genocide and brutality was their way of ensuring Lebensraum ("living space") for those who met Hitler's narrow racial requirements; this necessitated the elimination of Bolsheviks and Slavs:

The Nazi revolution was broader than just the Holocaust. Its second goal was to eliminate Slavs from Central and Eastern Europe and to create a Lebensraum for Aryans ... As Bartov (The Eastern Front; Hitler's Army) shows, it barbarised the German armies on the eastern front. Most of their three million men, from generals to ordinary soldiers, helped exterminate captured Slav soldiers and civilians. This was sometimes cold and deliberate murder of individuals (as with Jews), sometimes generalised brutality and neglect ... German soldiers' letters and memoirs reveal their terrible reasoning: Slavs were 'the Asiatic-Bolshevik' horde, an inferior but threatening race.

==== Polish people ====
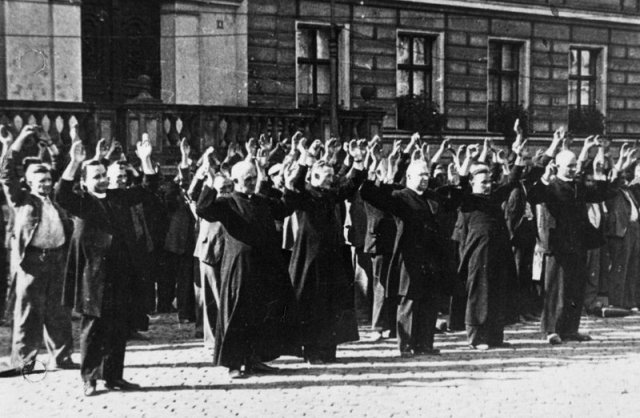
Polish priests and civilians in Bydgoszcz's Old Market Square, 9 September 1939. The Polish Church experienced brutal persecution under Nazi occupation.

The Nazi occupation of Poland was among the most brutal of the war, resulting in the murder of more than 1.8 million ethnic Poles and about 3 million Polish Jews. The Polish victims represented nearly 22 percent of the country's population. In a 22 August 1939 speech to Wehrmacht commanders a week before the invasion of Poland, Hitler said, "Kill without pity or mercy all men, women and children of Polish descent or language.... Be merciless. Be brutal. It is necessary to proceed with maximum severity. The war is to be a war of annihilation."

Intelligentsia, socially prominent, and influential people were primarily targeted, although ethnic Poles and other Slavic groups were also killed en masse. Hundreds of thousands of Roman Catholic and Orthodox Poles were sent to Auschwitz-Birkenau and other concentration camps, and the intelligentsia were the first targets of the Einsatzgruppen death squads. The anti-Polish campaign culminated in the near-complete destruction of Warsaw, ordered by Hitler and Himmler in 1944. The original assumptions of Generalplan Ost were based on plans to exterminate around 85% (over 20 million) of ethnically Polish citizens of Poland, with the remaining 15% to be used as slaves.

According to Norman Davies, the Nazi terror was "much fiercer and more protracted in Poland than anywhere in Europe." Nazi ideology viewed ethnic Poles—the mainly Catholic ethnic majority of Poland—as subhuman. After their 1939 invasion of Poland, the Nazis instituted a policy of murdering (or suppressing) the ethnic-Polish elite (including Catholic religious leaders). The Nazi plan for Poland was the nation's destruction, which necessitated attacking the Polish Church, (particularly in areas annexed by Germany). About the brief period of military control from 1 September to 25 October 1939, Davies wrote: "According to one source, 714 mass executions were carried out, and 6,376 people, mainly Catholics, were shot. Others put the death toll in one town alone at 20,000. It was a taste of things to come."

Among the persecuted resisters was Irena Sendler, head of the children's section of Żegota, who placed more than 2,500 Jewish children in convents, orphanages, schools, hospitals, and homes. Captured by the Gestapo in 1943, Sendlerowa was crippled by torture.

==== Ukrainians ====
Between 1941 and 1945, approximately three million Ukrainian and other gentiles were murdered as part of Nazi extermination policies in present-day Ukraine. More Ukrainians were killed fighting the Wehrmacht in the Red Army than American, British and French soldiers combined. Original Nazi plans called for the extermination of 65 percent of the nation's 23.2 million Ukrainians, with the survivors treated as slaves. According to Bohdan Wytwycky, an estimated 3 million Ukrainians were killed by the Nazis for racially-motivated reasons. Over two million Ukrainians were deported to Germany as slave labor. The ten-year plan would have exterminated, expelled, Germanized or enslaved most (or all) Ukrainians.

==== Russians and Soviet POWs ====
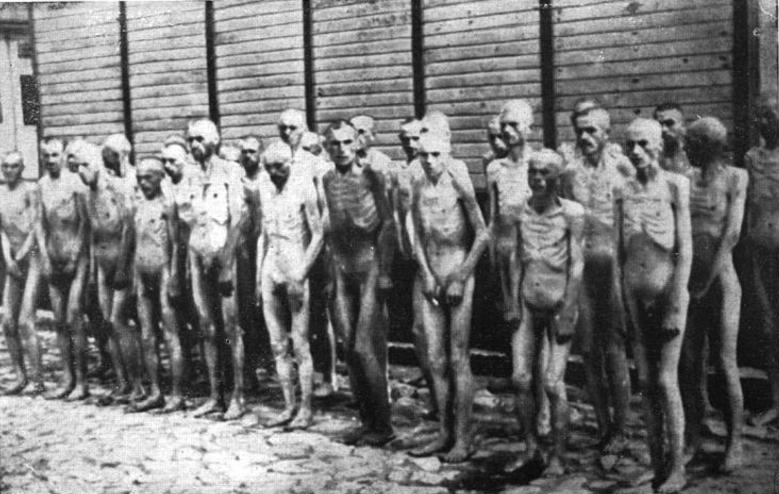
Naked Soviet prisoners of war in Mauthausen concentration camp

During Operation Barbarossa (the Axis invasion of the Soviet Union), millions of Red Army prisoners of war were summarily executed in the field by German armies (the Waffen SS in particular), died under inhumane conditions in German prisoner of war camps, on death marches, or had been shipped to concentration camps for execution. The Germans killed an estimated 2.8 million Soviet POWs by starvation, exposure, and execution over an eight-month period in 1941–42. According to the U.S. Holocaust Memorial Museum, by the winter of 1941 "starvation and disease resulted in mass death of unimaginable proportions". 140,000-500,000 Soviet citizens and POWs were murdered in the concentration camps.

Soviet civilian populations in the occupied areas were severely persecuted and endured the treacherous conditions of the Eastern Front, which spawned atrocities such as the siege of Leningrad, when 1.2 million civilians died. Thousands of peasant villages across Russia, Belarus and Ukraine were annihilated by German troops. During the occupation, the Leningrad, Pskov and Novgorod regions lost about a quarter of their populations. An estimated one-quarter of Soviet civilian deaths at the hands of the Nazis and their allies (including three million Ukrainians and 1.5 million Belarusians) were racially motivated. In 1995, the Russian Academy of Sciences reported that civilian deaths in the occupied USSR, including Jews, at the hands of the Germans totaled 13.7 million dead (20% of the population of 68 million). The figure includes 7.4 million victims of Nazi genocide and reprisals, 2.2 million deaths of persons deported to Germany as forced labour, and 4.1 million famine and disease deaths. An estimated three million people also died of starvation in unoccupied territory. The losses occurred within the 1946–1991 borders of the USSR, and include territories annexed in 1939–40. The deaths of 8.2 million Soviet civilians, including Jews, were documented by the Soviet Extraordinary State Commission.

=== Romani people ===
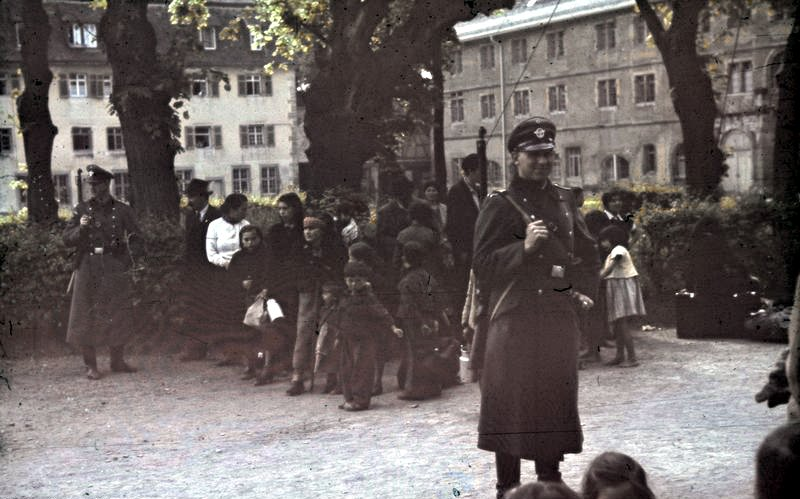
German police round up Romani in Asperg, Germany in May 1940

The Nazi genocide of the Romani people was ignored by scholars until the 1980s, and opinions continue to differ on its details. According to historians Donald Niewyk and Francis Nicosia, the genocide of the Romani began later than that of the Jews and a smaller percentage was murdered. Hitler's genocidal campaign against Europe's Romani population involved the application of Nazi "racial hygiene" (selective breeding applied to humans). Despite discriminatory measures, some Romani (including some of Germany's Sinti and Lalleri) were spared deportation and death, with the remaining Romani groups suffering a fate similar to that of the Jews. Romani were deported to the Jewish ghettos, were shot by SS Einsatzgruppen in their villages, or deported and gassed in Auschwitz-Birkenau and Treblinka.

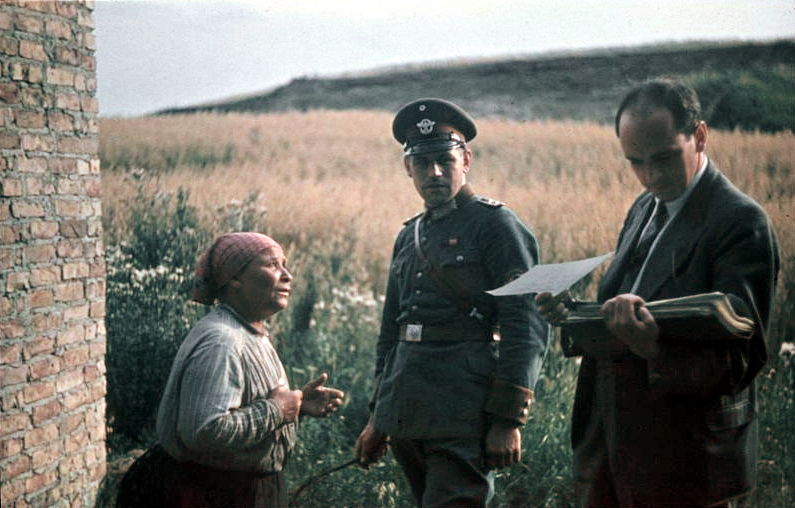
Romani woman with German police officer and Nazi psychologist Dr. Robert Ritter

Estimates of the number of Romani victims range from 250,000 to 500,000. The Romani genocide was formally recognized by West Germany in 1982 and by Poland in 2011.

=== Non-Europeans ===
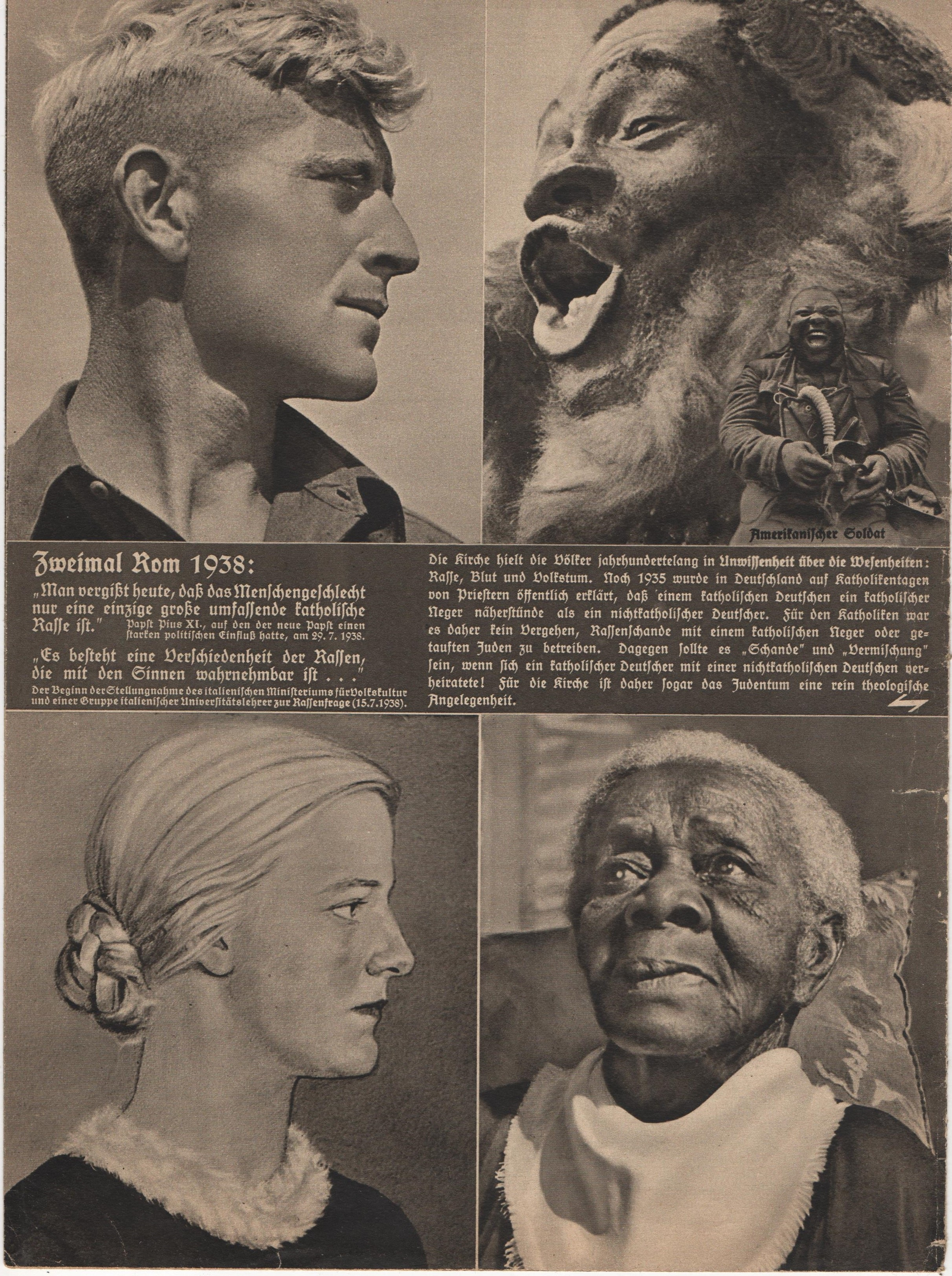
Nazi anti-Catholic propaganda which positions the Church as supportive of so-called "race defilement" (miscegenation)

==== Black people ====
The Nazis promoted xenophobia and racism against all "non-Aryan" races. African (black) residents of Germany and black prisoners of war, such as French colonial troops and African Americans, were also victims of Nazi racial policy. When the Nazis came to power, hundreds of African-German children, the offspring of German mothers and African soldiers brought in during the French occupation, lived in the Rhineland. In Mein Kampf, Hitler described the children of marriages to African occupation troops as a contamination of the white race "by Negro blood on the Rhine in the heart of Europe" who were "bastardising the European continent at its core". According to Hitler, "Jews were responsible for bringing Negroes into the Rhineland, with the ultimate idea of bastardising the white race which they hate and thus lowering its cultural and political level so that the Jew might dominate".

==== Asian and Turkic peoples ====
Japan signed the Tripartite Pact with Germany and Italy on 27 September 1940, and was part of the Axis. No Japanese people were deliberately imprisoned or killed, since they were considered "honorary Aryans". The same applied to Turks and all other "Ural-Altaic" peoples. It did not apply to the Chinese in Nazi Germany.

== People with disabilities ==
Beginning with the 1933 Law for the Prevention of Hereditarily Diseased Offspring, Nazi Germany persecuted those classified as "hereditarily ill". Men, women, and children who were deemed mentally, physically, or genetically unfit for society were subject to involuntary hospitalization, involuntary euthanasia, and forced sterilization.

According to their eugenics policy, the Nazis believed that the disabled were a financial and genetic burden to society because they needed care and were considered an affront to their notion of a society composed of a perfect race. About 375,000 people were sterilized against their will due to their disabilities.

Those with disabilities were among the first to be murdered by the Nazis; according to the U.S. Holocaust Memorial Museum, the T-4 Program (established in 1939) was the model for future Nazi exterminations and it set a precedent for the genocide of what they described as the Jewish race. The program attempted to maintain the "purity" of the Aryan race by systematically murdering children and adults with physical deformities or suffering from mental illness, using gas chambers for the first time. Although Hitler formally halted the program in late August 1941, the killings secretly continued until the end of the war and an estimated 275,000 people with congenital disabilities were murdered.

== LGBT people ==
=== Homosexual men ===
Homosexual men were also targets of Nazi Germany, since male homosexuality was deemed incompatible with Nazism. The Nazis believed that gay men were weak, effeminate and unable to fight for the German nation; homosexuals were unlikely to produce children and increase the German birthrate. According to the Nazis, "inferior races" produced more children than Aryans, so anything which diminished Germany's reproductive potential was considered a racial danger. Homosexuality was also thought to be contagious by the Nazis. By 1936, Heinrich Himmler was leading efforts to persecute gay men under existing and new anti-homosexual laws. More than one million gay Germans were targeted, of whom at least 100,000 were arrested and 50,000 were convicted and imprisoned. An unknown number were institutionalized in state-run mental hospitals. Hundreds of European gay men living under Nazi occupation were chemically castrated by court order. While an estimated 5,000 to 15,000 gay men were imprisoned in concentration camps, it is thought that hundreds (or perhaps thousands) were killed. According to Austrian survivor Heinz Heger, gay men "suffered a higher mortality rate than other relatively small victim groups, such as Jehovah's Witnesses and political prisoners". Gay men in Nazi concentration camps were identified by a pink triangle on their shirts, along with men convicted of sexually assaulting children and bestiality. According to the U.S. Holocaust Memorial Museum's website, "Nazi Germany did not seek to kill all homosexuals. Nevertheless, the Nazi state, through active persecution, attempted to terrorise German homosexuals into sexual and social conformity, leaving thousands dead and shattering the lives of many more."

==== Post-Nazi persecution ====
Many homosexuals who were liberated from the concentration camps were persecuted in postwar Germany. Survivors were subject to prosecution under Paragraph 175 (which forbade "lewdness between men"), with time served in the concentration camps deducted from their sentences. This contrasted with the treatment of other groups persecuted by Nazi Germany, who were compensated for the loss of family members and educational opportunities.

=== Transgender people ===
In Nazi Germany, transgender people were prosecuted, barred from public life, forcibly detransitioned, and imprisoned and killed in concentration camps. Though some factors, such as whether they were considered "Aryan", heterosexual with regard to their birth sex, or capable of useful work had the potential to mitigate their circumstances, being transgender was largely considered an act of deceit by the Nazi state, and German citizens were encouraged to report them whenever and wherever possible.

== Political groups ==
=== Anti-Nazi dissidents in Germany ===
Another large group of victims was composed of German and foreign civilian activists from across the political spectrum who opposed the Nazi regime, captured resistance fighters (many of whom were executed during—or immediately after—their interrogation, particularly in occupied Poland and France) and, sometimes, their families. German political prisoners were a substantial proportion of the first inmates at Dachau (the prototypical Nazi concentration camp). The political People's Court was notorious for the number of its death sentences.

=== Republicans of Spain ===
Thousands of Spanish Republican refugees were living in France at the time of its occupation by Nazi Germany in 1940; 15,000 were detained in concentration camps, including 7,000 in Mauthausen-Gusen. Around 3,500 were murdered in the camp.

=== Communists and other leftists ===
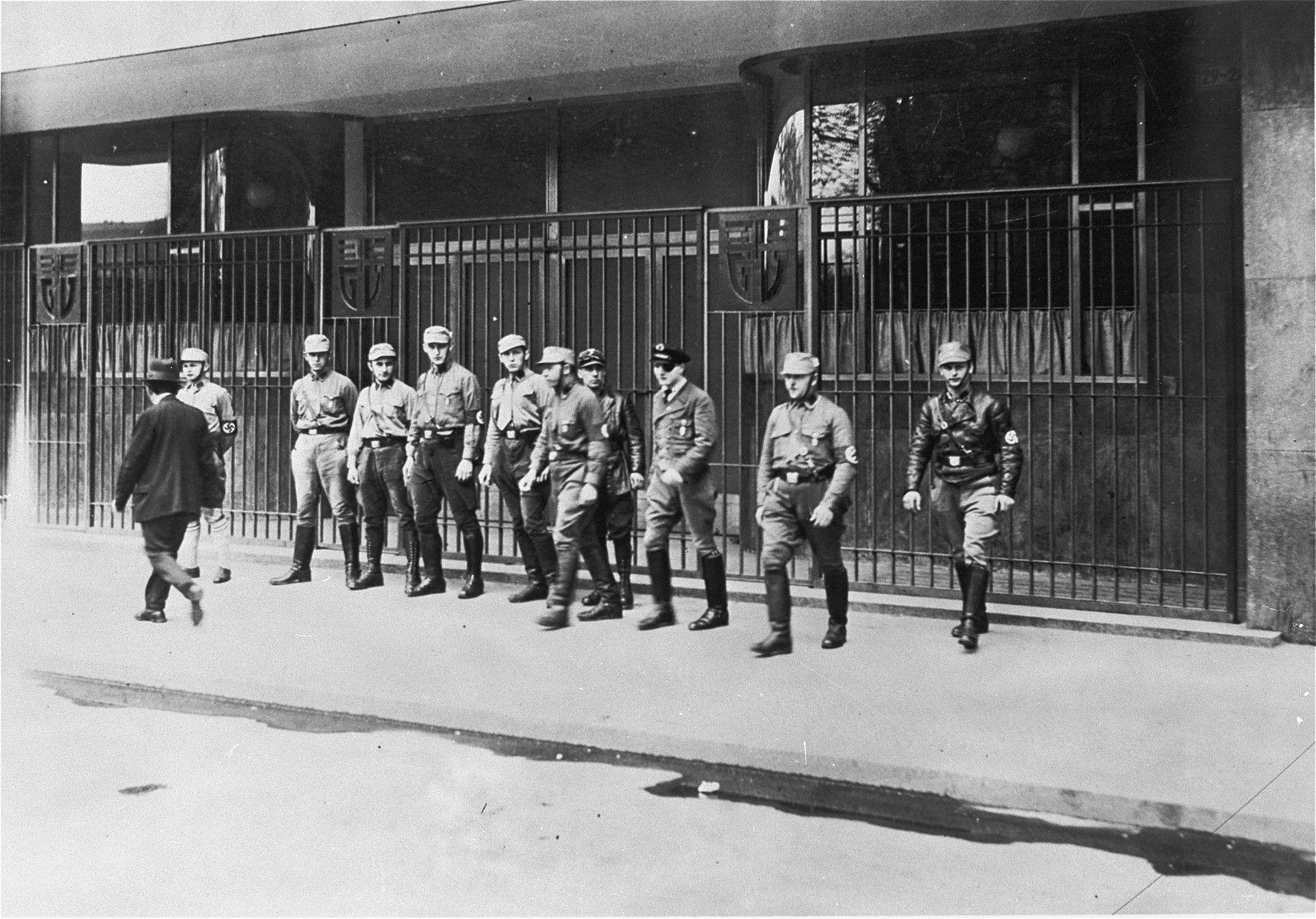
Nazi SA guard shut-down trade union headquarters in Berlin, 2 May 1933

German communists were among the first to be imprisoned in concentration camps. Their ties to the USSR concerned Hitler, and the Nazi Party was intractably opposed to communism. Rumors of communist violence were spread by the Nazis to justify the Enabling Act of 1933, which gave Hitler his first dictatorial powers. Hermann Göring testified at Nuremberg that Nazi willingness to repress German Communists prompted Hindenburg and the old elite to cooperate with them. Hitler and the Nazis also despised German leftists because of their resistance to Nazi racism. Hitler referred to Marxism and "Bolshevism" as means for "the international Jew" to undermine "racial purity", stir up class tension and mobilize trade unions against the government and business. When the Nazis occupied a territory, communists, socialists and anarchists were usually among the first to be repressed; this included summary executions. An example is Hitler's Commissar Order, in which he demanded the summary execution of all Soviet troops who were political commissars who offered resistance or were captured in battle.

=== Citizens of the Allied powers ===
Thousands of people, primarily diplomats, of nationalities associated with the Allies (China and Mexico, for example) and Spanish Civil War refugees in occupied France were interned or executed. After Italy's 1943 surrender, many Italian nationals (including partisans and Italian soldiers disarmed by the Germans) were sent to concentration camps.

==== Western Allied POWs ====
On rare occasions, POWs from Western Allied armies were sent to concentration camps, including 350 Americans – some chosen for being Jewish, but mostly for looking Jewish or for being troublemakers or otherwise 'undesirable'. Some captured in the Battle of the Bulge were forced into slave labor at the Berga concentration camp, a subcamp of Buchenwald; over 70 were killed by the conditions there. The "KLB Club" was a group of 168 Allied airmen – mainly American, British, and Canadian – considered Terrorfliegers ("terror fliers"), denied POW status, and held at Buchenwald for two months until a German officer arranged their transfer to a standard POW camp, a week before their scheduled execution.

== Religious groups ==
The Nazis also targeted religious groups for political and ideological reasons. Hitler vehemently despised Christianity, calling it the enemy of National Socialism. According to historian William Shirer, "under the leadership of Rosenberg, Bormann and Himmler, who were backed by Hitler, the Nazi regime intended eventually to destroy Christianity in Germany, if it could, and substitute the old paganism of the early tribal Germanic gods and the new paganism of the Nazi extremists." He also wrote that Hitler "inveighed against political Catholicism in Mein Kampf and attacked both of the Christian Churches [i.e. the Roman Catholic and the Protestant] for their failure to recognise the racial problem...".

=== Jehovah's Witnesses ===
Historian Detlef Garbe, director of the Neuengamme Memorial in Hamburg, wrote about Jehovah's Witnesses: "No other religious movement resisted the pressure to conform to National Socialism [Nazism] with comparable unanimity and steadfastness". Between 2,500 and 5,000 Jehovah's Witnesses were murdered in the concentration camps; unwilling to fight for any cause, they refused to serve in the army.

=== Catholics ===
The Nazis persecuted the Catholic Church, with the Nazi leadership hoping to gradually de-Christianize Germany. According to the World Holocaust Remembrance Center, "By the latter part of the decade of the Thirties, church officials were well aware that the ultimate aim of Hitler and other Nazis was the total elimination of Catholicism and of the Christian religion." Political Catholicism was a target of Hitler's 1934 Night of the Long Knives. German clergy, nuns and lay leaders were also targeted after the Nazi takeover, leading to thousands of arrests over the following years. Priests who were part of the Catholic resistance were killed. Hitler's invasion of Catholic Poland in 1939 began World War II, and the Nazis targeted clergy, monks and nuns in their campaign to destroy Polish culture.

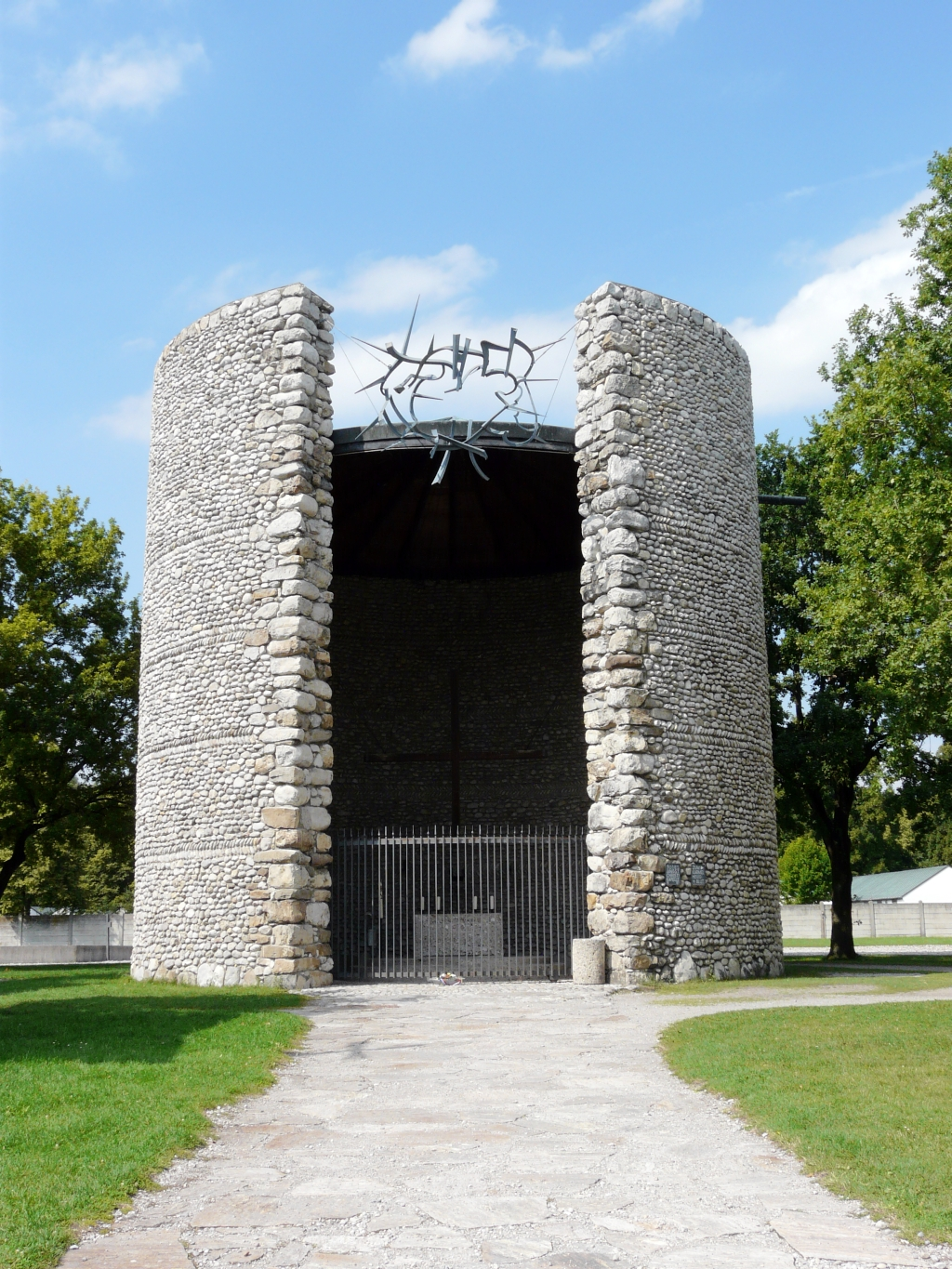
The Mortal Agony of Christ Chapel at Dachau commemorates the clergy who were imprisoned there.

In 1940, the Priest Barracks of Dachau Concentration Camp was established. Of 2,720 clergy imprisoned at Dachau, the overwhelming majority (94.88 percent) were Catholic. According to Ian Kershaw, about 400 German priests were sent to the camp. Although the Holy See concluded a 1933 concordat with Germany to protect Catholicism during Nazi rule, the Nazis frequently violated the pact in their Kirchenkampf ("struggle with the churches"). They shut down the Catholic press, schools, political parties and youth groups in Germany amid murder and mass arrests. In March 1937, Pope Pius XI issued his Mit brennender Sorge encyclical accusing the Nazi government of violating the 1933 concordat and sowing the "tares of suspicion, discord, hatred, calumny, of secret and open fundamental hostility to Christ and His Church".

The church was especially harshly treated in annexed regions, such as Austria. Viennese Gauleiter Odilo Globocnik confiscated property, closed Catholic organizations and sent many priests to Dachau. In the Czech lands, religious orders were suppressed, schools closed, religious instruction forbidden and priests sent to concentration camps. Catholic bishops, clergy, nuns and laypeople protested and attacked Nazi policies in occupied territories; in 1942, the Dutch bishops protested the mistreatment of Jews. When Archbishop Johannes de Jong refused to yield to Nazi threats, the Gestapo rounded up Catholic "Jews" and sent 92 to Auschwitz. One Catholic abducted in this manner was nun Edith Stein, who was murdered at Auschwitz along with Poland's Maximilian Kolbe. Other Catholic victims of Nazi Germany have been beatified, including Poland's 108 Martyrs of World War II, the Martyrs of Nowogródek, Dutch theologian Titus Brandsma and Germany's Lübeck martyrs and Bernhard Lichtenberg.

==== In occupied Poland ====
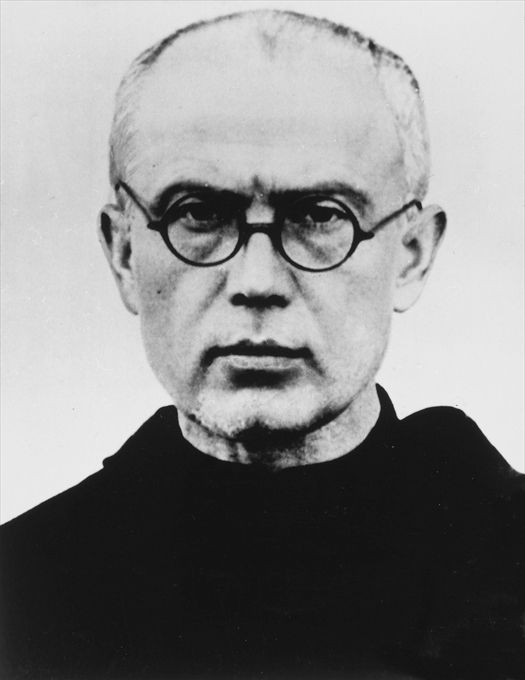
Polish Franciscan Maximilian Kolbe was murdered at Auschwitz.

In Polish areas annexed by Nazi Germany, a severe persecution of the Catholic church began. The Nazis systematically dismantled the church, arresting its leaders, exiling its clergy and closing its churches, monasteries and convents. Germanization of the annexed regions began in December 1939, with deportations of men, women and children. According to Richard J. Evans, in the Reichsgau Wartheland "numerous clergy, monks, diocesan administrators and officials of the Church were arrested, deported to the General Government, taken off to a concentration camp in the Reich, or simply shot. Altogether some 1700 Polish priests ended up at Dachau: half of them did not survive their imprisonment." Among the clergy who were murdered at Dachau were many of the 108 Polish Martyrs of World War II.

Hans Frank said in 1940, "Poles may have only one master—a German. Two masters cannot exist side by side, and this is why all members of the Polish intelligentsia must be killed." Thomas J. Craughwell wrote that from 1939 to 1945, an estimated 3,000 members of the Polish clergy (18 percent) were murdered; of these, 1,992 were murdered in concentration camps. According to the Encyclopædia Britannica, 1,811 Polish priests were murdered in Nazi concentration camps.

=== Protestants ===
The Nazis attempted to deal with Protestant dissent with their ideology by creating the Reich Church, a union of 28 existing Protestant groups espousing Positive Christianity (a doctrine compatible with Nazism). Non-Aryan ministers were suspended and church members called themselves German Christians, with "the swastika on their chest and the cross in their heart." The Protestant opposition to the Nazis established the Confessing Church, a rival umbrella organization of independent German regional churches which was persecuted.

=== Freemasons ===
While Nazi propaganda often linked Jews and Freemasons, there was no stringent policy against Freemasons and the number of people arrested or murdered just because they were Freemasons is unknown.

== Other groups ==
=== Civilians engaged in non-violent resistance ===
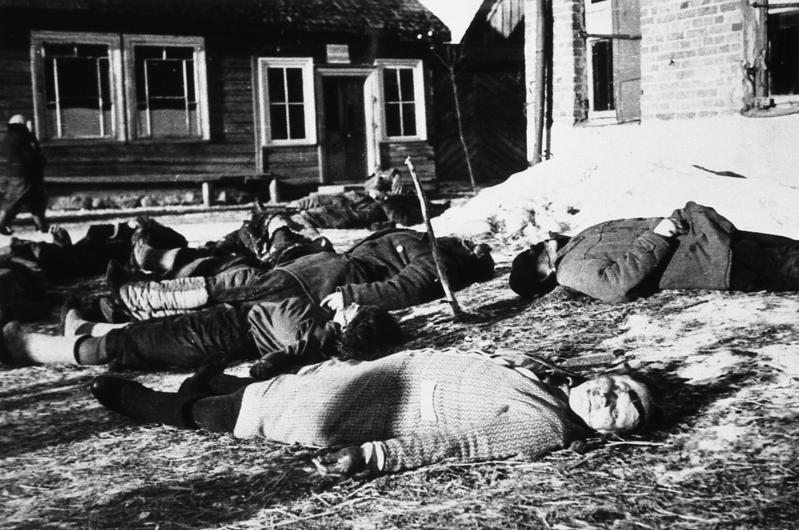
Dead Soviet civilians near Minsk, Belarus, 1943

The SS and police conducted mass actions against civilians with alleged links to resistance movements, their families, and villages or city districts. Notorious killings occurred in Lidice, Khatyn, Kragujevac, Sant'Anna and Oradour-sur-Glane, and a district of Warsaw was obliterated. In occupied Poland, Nazi Germany imposed the death penalty on those found sheltering (or aiding) Jews.

=== Petty criminals and "social deviants" ===
"Social deviants"—prostitutes, vagrants, alcoholics, drug addicts, open dissidents, pacifists, draft resisters and common criminals—were also imprisoned in concentration camps. The common criminals frequently became Kapos, inmate guards of fellow prisoners.

Some Germans and Austrians who had lived abroad for much of their lives were considered to have had too much exposure to foreign ideas, and were sent to concentration camps. These prisoners, known as "emigrants", each wore a blue triangle.

== See also ==
- List of genocides
- Genocides in history (World War I through World War II)
- World War II casualties
- World War II casualties of the Soviet Union

== Bibliography ==
- Berenbaum, Michael (2005). The World Must Know: The History of the Holocaust as Told in the United States Holocaust Memorial Museum. United States Holocaust Memorial Museum, Johns Hopkins University Press. ISBN 978-0801883583.
- Evans, Richard J. (2009). The Third Reich at War. New York: Penguin Press.
- Kay, Alex J. (2021). Empire of Destruction: A History of Nazi Mass Killing. Yale University Press. ISBN 978-0-300-26253-7.
