= Zinskauf =

Medieval financial instrument

Zinskauf ([ˈt͡sɪns.kaʊ̯f], "purchase interest") was a financial instrument, similar to an annuity, that rose to prominence in the Middle Ages. The decline of the Byzantine Empire led to a growth of capital in Europe, so the Catholic Church tolerated zinskauf as a way to avoid prohibitions on usury. Since zinskauf was an exchange of a fixed amount of money for annual income it was considered a sale rather than a loan. As early as 14th century, this financial model became accepted in the Florentine Republic and advocated by Franciscan friars including Francesco da Empoli. In the 16th century Holy Roman Empire, Martin Luther made zinskauf a subject of his Treatise on Usury and his Sermon on Trade and Usury and criticized clerics of the Catholic Church for violating the spirit if not the letter of usury laws.

In one historian's analysis:

This financial transaction, for which no direct equivalent exists in modern finance, essentially was a contract in which the rights to use a piece of land or other property were sold in exchange for fixed payments over a specified period of time. To avoid the appearance of usury, the creditor in this transaction was regarded as the buyer who purchased a fixed income from the debtor, who then merely was considered to be the seller of a predetermined stipend." Luther viewed this practice to be usurious since at the expiration of the zinskauf the creditor had increased in net-worth without ever engaging in labor.
