= Francesco da Empoli =

14th-century Italian Franciscan friar, theologian, and scholar

- Born: early 14th century Italy
- Died: October 12, 1370; Florence, Republic of Florence
- Occupations: Franciscan friar, theologian, preacher
- Notable work: Determinatio de materia montis

Francesco da Empoli (died 12 October 1370) was an Italian Franciscan friar, preacher, and theologian. He became known for his role in theological debates over public debt and usury in 14th-century Florence and for his scholastic defense of the legality of trading government securities.

== Biography ==
Little is known about Francesco da Empoli's early life. He was born in the early 14th century. He entered the Franciscan Order and achieved prominence as a scholar. By the mid-1340s he was studying theology in England, supported by the Franciscan Order during his stay at the University of Oxford around 1345, where he likely obtained a degree in theology.

He later served at the Franciscan convent of Santa Croce in Florence as lecturer and vicar. In 1359, he was appointed professor of theology at the Florentine Studium (university) and later served as provincial minister of the Franciscan Order in Tuscany from 1360 to 1367, and again from 1369 to 1370.

During the 1350s, Francesco became involved in a major moral and economic controversy concerning the Monte comune, the public-debt fund of the Republic of Florence. Established in 1345–1347 to manage forced loans, the Monte paid interest to creditors and its shares were traded in a secondary market, raising questions about usury under canon law.

In 1353–1354, a fierce debate erupted among theologians on whether such trade was morally licit. According to chronicler Matteo Villani, two principal figures were the Dominican friar Piero di Strozzi, who condemned the practice, and Francesco da Empoli, who defended it in public disputations and sermons.

Both agreed that a citizen lending money to the state for profit was a usurer under Church law and that a forced lender could justly receive modest compensation (about 5%) as indemnity, not profit. However, they disagreed about secondary-market transactions: Strozzi deemed them usurious, while Empoli argued they were legitimate contracts of sale.

Francesco’s position gained considerable support. He elaborated his views in his treatise Determinatio de materia montis ("Decision on the Matter of the Monte"), written around 1353. Villani noted that he continued to defend the Monte “without any scruple of conscience.” Francesco da Empoli died in Florence on 12 October 1370 and was buried in the Basilica of Santa Croce. The poet Franco Sacchetti eulogized him as a “worthy master” in a sonnet written after his death.

== Views on public debt and usury ==
In Determinatio de materia montis, Francesco da Empoli developed a rigorous scholastic argument defending both the Monte and the trading of government debt securities. He maintained that investors or speculators in government debt could not be considered usurers under Church doctrine. His reasoning was grounded in several key points:

=== Sale versus loan ===
Francesco argued that the transfer of a government bond was a sale of a financial claim, not a loan of money. According to canon law, usury could arise only from a loan, not from a sale. When an investor purchased a government security, he did not lend money to either the city or the seller but paid a price to assume the seller’s claim against the state. Any gain realized was thus a profit from purchase, not interest on a loan.

=== A right, not a physical good ===
The object of sale was a right — the right to collect income and principal from the government — rather than a tangible good or money. The buyer effectively stepped into the lender’s place as creditor without lending new funds. Therefore, the transaction was a legitimate sale of a claim, not a disguised loan.

=== Risk and uncertainty (venditio sub dubio) ===
Francesco emphasized that the value of these credits was uncertain because repayment by the state was doubtful. By the mid-14th century, Florentine public debts were often irredeemable or subject to default, so market prices fluctuated widely. Thus, the sale of Monte credits was a venditio sub dubio (“sale under doubt”) — a risky exchange with uncertain outcome. Any eventual profit was a lawful reward for assuming risk, not usurious interest.

=== Analogy to insurance ===
Francesco compared bond transactions to marine insurance, which was permitted by the Church. In both cases, the purchaser or insurer accepted risk in exchange for payment. Just as insurance premiums were lawful, the bond-buyer’s profit was a legitimate return for bearing risk rather than interest on a loan. His reasoning departed from the traditional periculum sortis argument (risk to capital), since the transaction was not a loan at all but a sale of an uncertain income right. The buyer provided a valuable service by assuming the risk of non-payment, morally justifying any profit received.

== Influence ==
Francesco da Empoli’s defense of the Monte’s secondary market was innovative and influential. Though some Dominican and Augustinian theologians continued to oppose him, his views gained wide acceptance among Florentine officials, investors, and canon lawyers.

In 1383, the city of Florence formally incorporated his reasoning into statute, assuring investors that they could receive interest payments “without any scruple of conscience.” His treatise was later cited and endorsed by jurist Lorenzo di Antonio Ridolfi in Tractatus de usuris (1403), which reproduced large portions of Francesco’s work. Through these channels, his ideas entered the broader scholastic debate on the legitimacy of public debt, marking a significant early contribution to the history of economic thought.
