= Nazi views on Catholicism =

View of the Nazi party on Catholicism

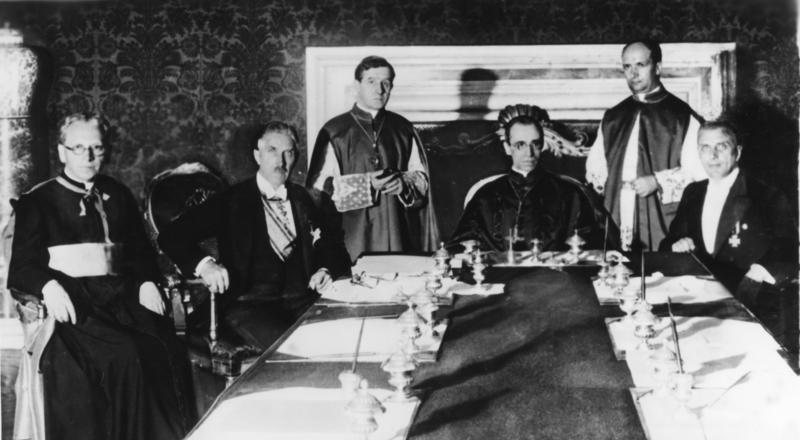
The signing of the Reichskonkordat on July 20, 1933, in Rome. From left to right: German prelate Ludwig Kaas, German Vice-Chancellor Franz von Papen, Secretary of Extraordinary Ecclesiastical Affairs Giuseppe Pizzardo, Cardinal Secretary of State Eugenio Pacelli, Alfredo Ottaviani, and member of Reichsministerium des Inneren (Home Office) Rudolf Buttmann.

Nazi ideology could not accept an autonomous establishment whose legitimacy did not spring from the government. It desired the subordination of the church to the state. To many Nazis, Catholics were suspected of insufficient patriotism, or even of disloyalty to the Fatherland, and of serving the interests of "sinister alien forces". Nazi radicals also disdained the Semitic origins of Jesus and the Christian religion. Although the broader membership of the Nazi Party after 1933 came to include many Catholics, aggressive anti-church radicals like Alfred Rosenberg, Martin Bormann, and Heinrich Himmler saw the kirchenkampf campaign against the churches as a priority concern, and anti-church and anti-clerical sentiments were strong among grassroots party activists.

The Hitler regime permitted various persecutions of the Church in the Greater Germanic Reich, though the political relationship between Church and state among Nazi allies was varied. While the Nazi Führer Adolf Hitler's public relationship to religion in Nazi Germany may be defined as one of opportunism, his personal position on Catholicism and Christianity was one of hostility. Hitler's chosen "deputy", Martin Bormann, an atheist, recorded in Hitler's Table Talk that Nazism was secular, scientific, and anti-religious in outlook.

Biographer Alan Bullock wrote that, although Hitler was raised as a Catholic and retained some regard for the organisational power of Catholicism, he had utter contempt for its central teachings, which, if taken to their conclusion, he said, "would mean the systematic cultivation of the human failure". Bullock wrote that Hitler frequently employed the language of "Providence" in defence of his own myth, but ultimately held a "materialist outlook, based on the nineteenth century rationalists' certainty that the progress of science would destroy all myths and had already proved Christian doctrine to be an absurdity". Though he was willing at times to restrain his anticlericalism out of political considerations, and approved the Reich concordat signed between Germany and the Holy See, his long term hope was for a de-Christianised Germany.

The 1920 Nazi Party Platform had promised to support freedom of religions with the caveat: "insofar as they do not jeopardize the state's existence or conflict with the moral sentiments of the Germanic race", and expressed support for so-called "Positive Christianity", a movement which sought to detach Christianity from its Jewish roots, and Apostles' Creed. William Shirer wrote that "under the leadership of Rosenberg, Bormann and Himmler—backed by Hitler—the Nazi regime intended to destroy Christianity in Germany, if it could, and substitute the old paganism of the early tribal Germanic gods and the new paganism of the Nazi extremists."

== Background ==
Roman Catholicism was widespread among European and Germanic people, but The Reformation divided German Christians between Protestantism and Catholicism. The Nazi movement arose during the period of the Weimar Republic in the aftermath of the disaster of World War I (1914–1918) and the subsequent political instability and grip of the Great Depression. In the 1930s, the Catholic Church and the Catholic Centre Party (Zentrum) were major social and political forces in predominantly Protestant Germany. Through the period of the Weimar Republic (1919–33/34) the Centre Party, aligned with both the Social Democrats and the leftist German Democratic Party, had maintained the centre ground against the rise of extremist parties of the left and right. Historically the Centre Party had had the strength to defy Bismark and been a bulwark of the Weimar Republic, yet, according to Bullock, from the summer of 1932, the Party had become "notoriously a Party whose first concern was to make accommodation with any government in power in order to secure the protection of its particular interests". It remained relatively moderate during the radicalisation of German politics which occurred with the onset of the Great Depression in Germany, but the party's deputies ultimately voted for the Enabling Act of March 1933, with which Hitler obtained plenary powers.

=== Early Nazi movement ===
Catholic Bavaria resented rule from Protestant Berlin, and Hitler at first saw revolution in Bavaria as a means to power - but an early attempt proved fruitless, and he was imprisoned after the 1923 Munich Beerhall Putsch. He used the time to produce Mein Kampf, in which he argued that the effeminate Jewish-Christian ethic was enfeebling Europe, and that Germany needed a man of iron to restore itself and build an empire. He decided on the tactic of pursuing power through "legal" means.

Hitler combined elements of autobiography with an exposition of his racist political ideology in Mein Kampf ('My Struggle'), published between 1925 and 1927. Laurence Rees wrote that emphasis on Christianity is missing from Mein Kampf, and described the thrust of the work as "bleak nihilism" revealing a cold universe with no moral structure other than the fight between different people for supremacy. Paul Berben wrote that insofar as the Christian denominations were concerned, Hitler declared himself to be neutral in Mein Kampf - but argued for clear separation between church and state, and for the church not to concern itself with the earthly life of the people, which must be the domain of the state. According to William Shirer, Hitler "inveighed against political Catholicism in Mein Kampf and attacked both of the Christian Churches for their failure to recognise the racial problem...", while also warning that no political party could succeed in "producing a religious reformation". The 1920 Nazi Party Platform had promised to support freedom of religions with the caveat: "insofar as they do not jeopardize the state's existence or conflict with the moral sentiments of the Germanic race". It further proposed a definition of a "positive Christianity" which could combat the "Jewish-materialistic spirit". The attitude of the Nazi party membership to the Catholic Church ranged from tolerance to near total renunciation.

=== Nazis take power ===
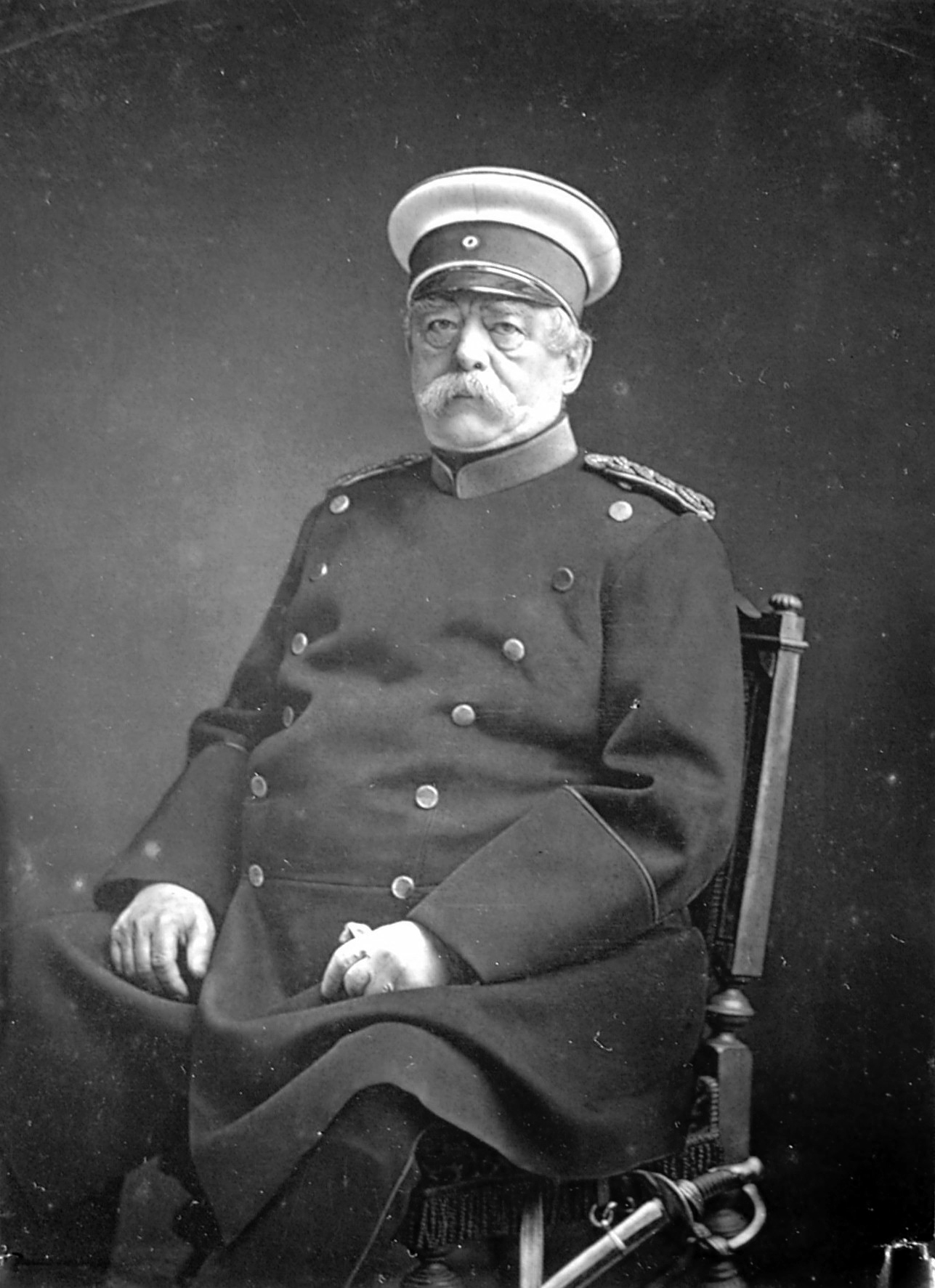
Otto von Bismarck became Chancellor of Germany in 1871 and launched the Kulturkampf Culture Struggle against the Roman Catholic Church in Germany.

A threatening, though initially mainly sporadic persecution of the Catholic Church in Germany followed the Nazi takeover. The Nazis claimed jurisdiction over all collective and social activity, interfering with Catholic schooling, youth groups, workers' clubs and cultural societies. "By the latter part of the decade of the Thirties", wrote Phayer, "church officials were well aware that the ultimate aim of Hitler and other Nazis was the total elimination of Catholicism and of the Christian religion. Since the overwhelming majority of Germans were either Catholic or Protestant this goal had to be a long-term rather than a short-term Nazi objective".

Hitler moved quickly to eliminate Political Catholicism. The dissolution of the Centre Party, a former bulwark of the Weimar Republic left modern Germany without a Catholic Party for the first time. Vice Chancellor Papen meanwhile negotiated a Reich concordat with the Vatican, which prohibited clergy from participating in politics. Kershaw wrote that the Vatican was anxious to reach agreement with the new government, despite "continuing molestation of Catholic clergy, and other outrages committed by Nazi radicals against the Church and its organisations". Hitler, nevertheless, had a "blatant disregard" for the Concordat, wrote Paul O'Shea, and its signing was to him merely a first step in the "gradual suppression of the Catholic Church in Germany". Anton Gill wrote that "with his usual irresistible, bullying technique, Hitler then proceeded to take a mile where he had been given an inch" and closed all Catholic institutions whose functions weren't strictly religious:

It quickly became clear that [Hitler] intended to imprison the Catholics, as it were, in their own churches. They could celebrate mass and retain their rituals as much as they liked, but they could have nothing at all to do with German society otherwise. Catholic schools and newspapers were closed, and a propaganda campaign against the Catholics was launched.

— Extract from An Honourable Defeat by Anton Gill

Richard J. Evans wrote that Hitler believed that in the long run National Socialism and religion would not be able to co-exist, and stressed repeatedly that Nazism was a secular ideology, founded on modern science: "Science, he declared, would easily destroy the last remaining vestiges of superstition". Germany could not tolerate the intervention of foreign influences such as the Pope and "Priests, he said, were 'black bugs', 'abortions in black cassocks'". He believed in a world Jewish conspiracy operating through social democracy, Marxism and Christianity.

== Views of leaders of the Third Reich ==
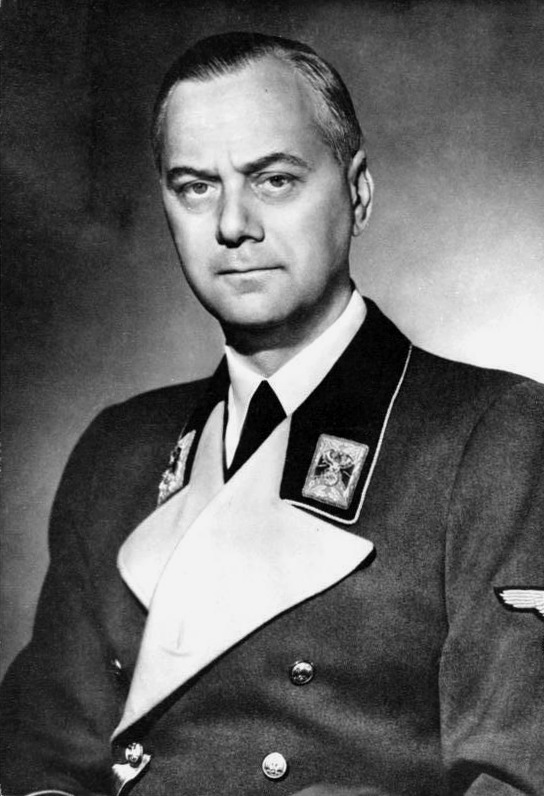
Alfred Rosenberg, the official "cultural and educational leader" of the Reich. A neo-pagan, and anti-Catholic, he wanted the extermination of the Christian faiths imported into Germany. His influence on the Nazi party's course, however, was limited.

The Nazis disliked the Catholic and Protestant churches. They wanted to transform the subjective consciousness of the German people—their attitudes, values and mentalities—into a single-minded, obedient "national community". Kershaw wrote that they believed they would therefore have to replace class, religious and regional allegiances by a "massively enhanced national self-awareness to mobilize the German people psychologically" for the coming struggle and war. Gill wrote that their long-term plan was to "de-Christianise Germany after the final victory".

Aggressive anti-Church radicals like Alfred Rosenberg and Martin Bormann saw the conflict with the Churches as a priority concern, and anti-church and anti-clerical sentiments were strong among grassroots party activists. According to Shirer, "under the leadership of Rosenberg, Bormann and Himmler—backed by Hitler—the Nazi regime intended to destroy Christianity in Germany, if it could, and substitute the old paganism of the early tribal Germanic gods and the new paganism of the Nazi extremists." The Nazi party had decidedly pagan elements. Once the war was over, Hitler wanted to root out and destroy the influence of the churches:.

In Hitler's eyes, Christianity was a religion fit only for slaves; he detested its ethics in particular. Its teaching, he declared, was a rebellion against the natural law of selection by struggle and the survival of the fittest.

— Extract from Hitler: a Study in Tyranny, by Alan Bullock

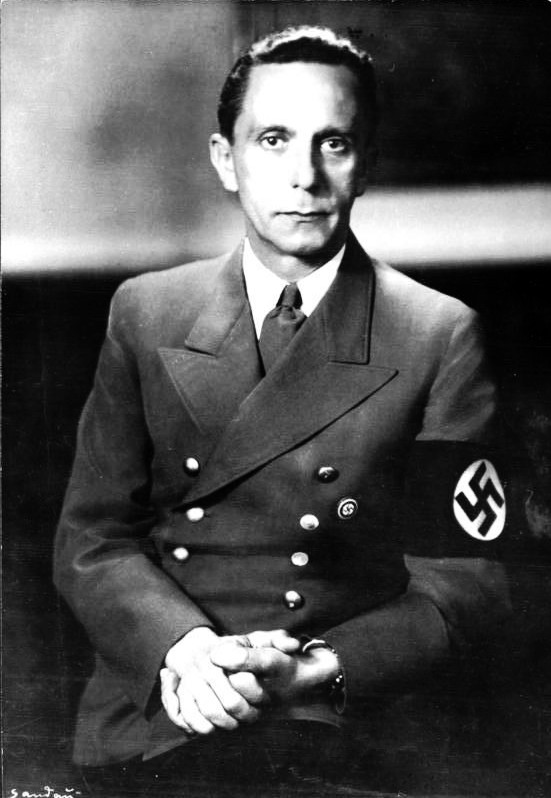
The Nazi propaganda minister, Joseph Goebbels. Born to a Catholic family, he later led the regime's persecution of Catholic clergy, and wrote that there was "an insoluble opposition between the Christian and a heroic-German world view".

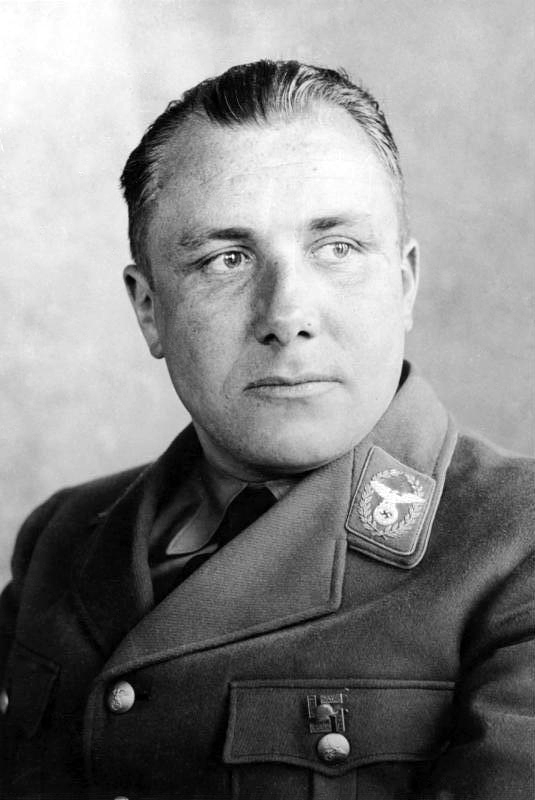
Martin Bormann, Hitler's "deputy" from 1941, saw Nazism and Christianity as "incompatible" and had a particular loathing for the Semitic origins of Christianity.

Hitler possessed radical instincts in relation to the kirchenkampf campaign against the Churches, and though he occasionally spoke of wanting to delay the Church struggle and was prepared to restrain his anticlericalism out of political considerations, his "own inflammatory comments gave his immediate underlings all the license they needed to turn up the heat in the 'Church Struggle, confident that they were 'working towards the Fuhrer'". Raised Catholic, Hitler retained some regard for the organisational power of the Church, but had utter contempt for its central teachings, which he said, if taken to their conclusion, "would mean the systematic cultivation of the human failure". However, important conservative elements, such as the officer corps, opposed Nazi persecution of the churches and, in office, Hitler restrained his anticlerical instincts out of political considerations.

Once in power, the Nazi leadership co-opted the term Gleichschaltung to mean conformity and subservience to the Nazi Party line: "there was to be no law but Hitler, and ultimately no god but Hitler". But Hitler was conscious that Bismark's kulturkampf struggle against the Church of the 1870s had been defeated by the unity of Catholics behind the Centre Party and was convinced that the Nazi movement could only succeed if Political Catholicism and its democratic networks were eliminated.

In January 1934, Hitler appointed Alfred Rosenberg as the cultural and educational leader of the Reich. Rosenberg was a neo-pagan and notoriously anti-Catholic. Rosenberg was initially the editor of the young Nazi Party's newspaper, the Volkischer Beobachter. In 1924, following Hitler's arrest, Hitler had chosen Rosenberg to oversee the Nazi movement while he was in prison (though this may have been because he was unsuitable for the task and unlikely to emerge as a rival). In "Myth of the Twentieth Century" (1930), Rosenberg described the Catholic Church as one of the main enemies of Nazism. Rosenberg proposed to replace traditional Christianity with the neo-pagan "myth of the blood":

We now realize that the central supreme values of the Roman and the Protestant Churches [-] hinder the organic powers of the peoples determined by their Nordic race, [-] they will have to be remodeled

— The Myth of the 20th Century, Alfred Rosenberg, 1930.

Church officials were perturbed by Hitler's appointment of Rosenberg as the state's official philosopher. The indication was that Hitler was endorsing Rosenberg's anti-Jewish, anti-Christian, and neo-pagan philosophy. The Vatican directed the Holy Office to place Rosenberg's Myth of the Twentieth Century on the Index of Forbidden books on February 7, 1934. Joachim Fest wrote of Rosenberg as having little or no political influence in making the regime's decisions and as a thoroughly marginalized figure.

Joseph Goebbels, the Minister for Propaganda, was among the most aggressive anti-clericalists. The son of a Catholic family from Rheydt in the Rhineland, he became one of the regime's most relentless Jew-baiters. Goebbels led the Nazi persecution of the clergy. On the "Church Question", he wrote "after the war it has to be generally solved ... There is, namely, an insoluble opposition between the Christian and a heroic-German world view".

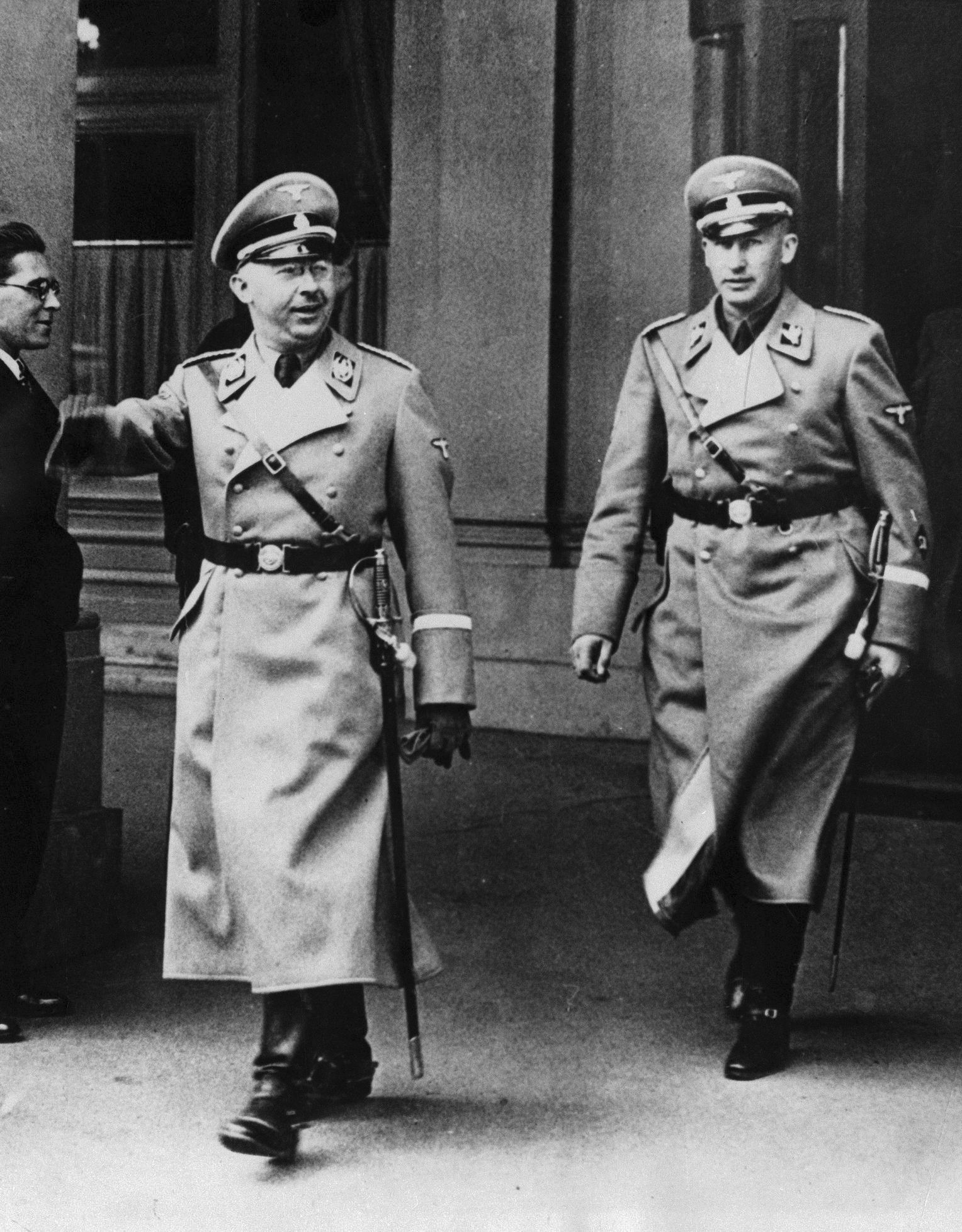
Heinrich Himmler (L) and Reinhard Heydrich (R) headed the Nazi security forces and were key architects of the Final Solution. Both believed that Christian values were among the enemies of Nazism.

Heinrich Himmler and Reinhard Heydrich headed the Nazi security forces and were key architects of the Final Solution. Both believed that Christian values were among the enemies of Nazism: the enemies were "eternally the same" wrote Heydrich: "the Jew, the Freemason, and the politically-oriented cleric." Modes of thinking like Christian and liberal individualism he considered to be residue of inherited racial characteristics, biologically sourced to Jewry—who must therefore be exterminated. According to Himmler biographer Peter Longerich, Himmler was vehemently opposed to Christian sexual morality and the "principle of Christian mercy", both of which he saw as a dangerous obstacle to his plans battle with "subhumans". In 1937 he wrote:

We live in an era of the ultimate conflict with Christianity. It is part of the mission of the SS to give the German people in the next half century the non-Christian ideological foundations on which to lead and shape their lives. This task does not consist solely in overcoming an ideological opponent but must be accompanied at every step by a positive impetus: in this case that means the reconstruction of the German heritage in the widest and most comprehensive sense.

— Heinrich Himmler, 1937

Himmler saw the main task of his Schutzstaffel (SS) organisation to be that of "acting as the vanguard in overcoming Christianity and restoring a 'Germanic' way of living" in order to prepare for the coming conflict between "humans and subhumans": Longerich wrote that, while the Nazi movement as a whole launched itself against Jews and Communists, "by linking de-Christianisation with re-Germanization, Himmler had provided the SS with a goal and purpose all of its own." He set about making his SS the focus of a "cult of the Teutons".

Hitler's chosen deputy and private secretary from 1941, Martin Bormann, was a rigid guardian of National Socialist orthodoxy. He believed, and said publicly in 1941 that "National Socialism and Christianity are irreconcilable".

Following the failure of the pro-Nazi Ludwig Muller to unite Protestants behind the Nazi Party in 1933, Hitler appointed his friend Hans Kerrl as Minister for Church Affairs in 1935. A relative moderate among Nazis, Kerrl nonetheless confirmed Nazi hostility to the Catholic and Protestant creeds in a 1937 address during an intense phase of the Nazi Kirchenkampf:

The Party stands on the basis of positive Christianity, and positive Christianity is National Socialism ... National Socialism is the doing of God's will ... God's will reveals itself in German blood ... Dr Zoellner and [Catholic Bishop of Münster] Count Galen have tried to make clear to me that Christianity consists in faith in Christ as the son of God. That makes me laugh ... No, Christianity is not dependent upon the Apostle's [sic] creed ... True Christianity is represented by the party, and the German people are now called by the party and especially the Fuehrer to a real Christianity ... the Fuehrer is the herald of a new revelation.

— Hans Kerrl, Nazi Minister for Church Affairs, 1937

=== During the war ===
Hitler called a truce in the Church conflict with the outbreak of war, wanting to back away from policies likely to cause internal friction in Germany. He decreed at the outset of war that "no further action should be taken against the Evangelical and Catholic Churches for the duration of the war". According to John Conway, "The Nazis had to reckon with the fact that, despite all Rosenberg's efforts, only 5 per cent of the population registered themselves at the 1930 census as no longer connected with Christian Churches." The support of millions of German Christians was needed in order for Hitler's plans to come to fruition. It was Hitler's belief that if religion is a help, "it can only be an advantage". Most of the 3 million Nazi Party members "still paid the Church taxes" and considered themselves Christians. Regardless, a number of Nazi radicals in the hierarchy determined that the Church Struggle should be continued. Following victory in Poland, the repression of the Churches was extended, despite their early protestations of loyalty to the cause.

Goebbels' Ministry of Propaganda issued threats and applied intense pressure on the Churches to voice support for the war, and the Gestapo banned Church meetings for a few weeks. In the first few months of the war, the German Churches complied. The Catholic bishops asked their followers to support the war effort. But the Nazis strongly disapproved of the sentiments against war expressed by the Pope through his first encyclical, Summi Pontificatus and his 1939 Christmas message, and were angry at his support for Poland and the "provocative" use of Vatican Radio by Cardinal Hlond of Poland. Distribution of the encyclical was banned.

Conway wrote that anti-church radical Reinhard Heydrich estimated in a report to Hitler of October 1939, that the majority of Church people were supporting the war effort - though a few "well known agitators among the pastors needed to be dealt with". Heydrich determined that support from church leaders could not be expected because of the nature of their doctrines and internationalism, so he devised measures to restrict the operation of the Churches under cover of war time exigencies, such as reducing resources available to Church presses on the basis of rationing, and prohibiting pilgrimages and large church gatherings on the basis of transportation difficulties. Churches were closed for being "too far from bomb shelters". Bells were melted down. Presses were closed. With the expansion of the war in the East from 1941, there came also an expansion of the regime's attack on the churches. Monasteries and convents were targeted and expropriation of Church properties surged.

Clergy in the German Resistance had some independence from the state apparatus, and could thus criticise it, while not being close enough to the centre of power to take steps to overthrow it. Mary Fulbrook wrote that when politics encroached on the church, Catholics were prepared to resist, but that the record was otherwise patchy and uneven, and that, with notable exceptions, "it seems that, for many Germans, adherence to the Christian faith proved compatible with at least passive acquiescence in, if not active support for, the Nazi dictatorship". A senior cleric could rely on a degree of popular support from the faithful, and thus the regime had to consider the possibility of nationwide protests if such figures were arrested. While hundreds of ordinary priests and members of monastic orders were sent to concentration camps throughout the Nazi period, just one German Catholic bishop was briefly imprisoned in a concentration camp, and just one other expelled from his diocese. This reflected also the cautious approach adopted by the hierarchy, who felt secure only in commenting on matters which transgressed on the ecclesiastical sphere.

The bishop of Münster, Clemens August von Galen, had rallied to the nationalist cause at the outbreak of war in 1939, but by 1941, his leadership of Catholic opposition to Nazi euthanasia had led to "the strongest, most explicit and most widespread protest movement against any policy since the beginning of the Third Reich." The speeches angered Hitler. In a 1942 Table Talk he said: "The fact that I remain silent in public over Church affairs is not in the least misunderstood by the sly foxes of the Catholic Church, and I am quite sure that a man like Bishop von Galen knows full well that after the war I shall extract retribution to the last farthing". Hitler wanted to have Galen removed, but Goebbels told him this would result in the loss of the loyalty of Westphalia. The regional Nazi leader, and Hitler's deputy Martin Bormann called for Galen to be hanged, but Hitler and Goebbels urged a delay in retribution till war's end.

== See also ==
- Catholic Church and Nazi Germany
- Catholic resistance to Nazi Germany
- Nazi persecution of the Catholic Church in Germany
- Nazi persecution of the Catholic Church in Poland

== Sources ==
- Conway, John S. (n.d.). The Nazi Persecution of the Churches, 1933-1945. Regent College Publishing.
- Shirer, William Lawrence (1960). The Rise and Fall of the Third Reich: A History of Nazi Germany. London: Secker & Warburg. Wikidata Q138049061.
- Hamerow, Theodore S. (1997). On the Road to the Wolf's Lair. German Resistance to Hitler. Belknap Press of Harvard University Press. ISBN 0-674-63680-5.
