= Center of Theological Inquiry =

American organization, founded 1978

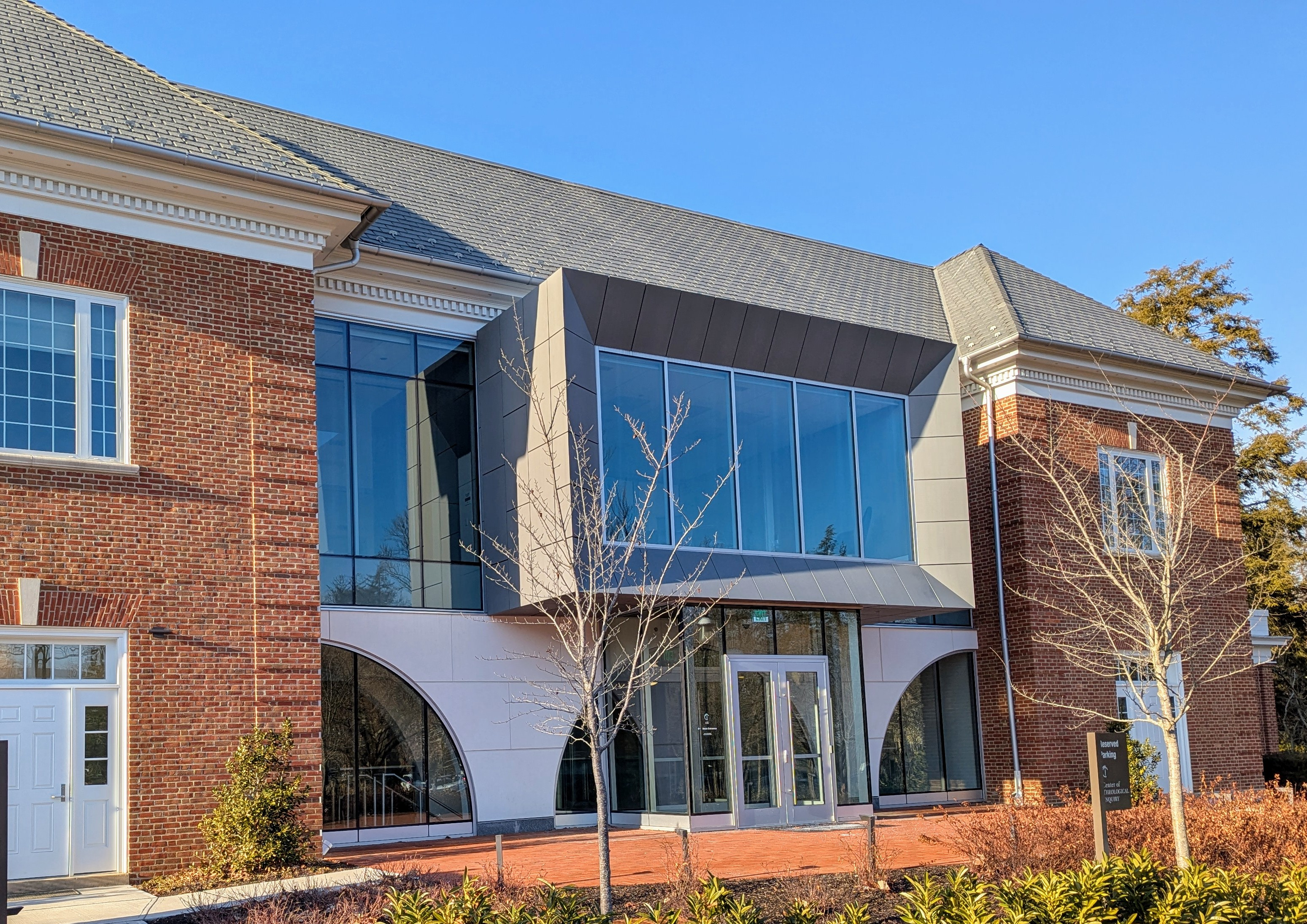
- Abbreviation: CTI
- Formation: August 1978
- Founder: James I. McCord
- Type: 501(c)(3) organization
- Location: 50 Stockton Street, Princeton, New Jersey 08540
- Region served: United States
- Website: www.ctinquiry.org

The Center of Theological Inquiry (CTI) is an independent nonprofit research institution in Princeton, New Jersey, United States. Founded as a 501(c)(3) organization in 1978, CTI fosters research on interdisciplinary dialogue between religion and science and about matters of global concern.

== History ==
The Center of Theological Inquiry was founded in 1978. Former Princeton Seminary president, James I. McCord served as its first chancellor. "Dr. McCord's vision for CTI was that it should become the premier North American research institution of its kind, an ecumenical institute devoted to interdisciplinary research in the field of religion."

In 1984 CTI completed construction of its headquarters at 50 Stockton Street on the site of the demolished Borough Hall in the Princeton Historic District. Funded by the Luce Foundation and named after the philanthropist Henry R. Luce, the Georgian Revival building was constructed to house up to a dozen residential scholars. Francis Otto Schmidt, a biologist at MIT, recalled his visit to CTI two years after its opening: "There we found a handsome two-story brick building which provided ample space for the chancellor, Dr. McCord, and his administrative staff plus conference rooms, a large library, and a private study room for each of the 12 fellows, who were free to study and investigate any theological subject that concerned them."

McCord served as chancellor for five years before retiring in 1989. The Trustees of CTI reorganized its leadership structure after McCord stepped down, creating the post of director in place of chancellor. An Anglican theologian, Daniel W. Hardy, became director of CTI in 1990, serving in that capacity until 1995. Wallace M. Alston, former pastor of Nassau Presbyterian Church, followed as director in 1995. During his tenure, Alston inaugurated the Pastor-Theologian program with help from the Lilly Endowment, reflecting his conviction that pastors are as "capable of theological scholarship as academic theologians.” Michael Welker, a member of CTI who was in residence several times during Alston's tenure as director, attested to the rich interdisciplinary environment of the period, "There I found dialogue partners from various parts of the world, theologians, philosophers, historians, and scientists."

In 1998 Alston appointed Robert W. Jenson, an American Lutheran theologian, as Senior Scholar for Research, with the responsibility to critique members' scholarship and to organize research colloquia. In an autobiographical reflection, Jenson recalls his seven-year tenure at CTI as being like "a spider sitting at the middle of a web that stretched out to theologians around the world and the ecumene." In 2003, Jenson and a number of CTI members, including Stacy Johnson and Peter W. Ochs, established the Scriptural Reasoning Research Group, which "examines medieval Christian, Muslim, and Jewish commentaries from the perspective of the practice of scriptural reasoning."

William Storrar, former Chair of Christian Ethics and Practical Theology at New College, Edinburgh, has served as the Director of CTI from 2005 to 2025. Among Storrar's innovations was the idea of themed seminars, which bring together theologians and scholars from other disciplines to analyze a topic of public concern from intedisciplinary perspectives. "As an independent research institute with no permanent faculty or specialization in any one field, CTI fosters wide-ranging work that is carried out and carried forward by visiting scholars from across disciplines, religions, and nations, whom we gather together in resident seminars at the Center in Princeton," Storrar writes. "As a result, our research conversation is continually being renewed." In 2007, Storrar hosted the founding meeting of the Global Network for Public Theology, which connects research institutions focused on religion and public life worldwide, at CTI. Since July 2015, Joshua Mauldin, a theological ethicist, has served as associate director of CTI.

Storrar led a major renovation of CTI's building during his period as director. By 2020, the design of its Georgian headquarters had outlived its function as the program of CTI evolved to become more thematic and interdisciplinary. Storrar and the Board of Trustees engaged the architectural firm of Michael Graves to re-envision the structure for the 21st century, emphasizing digital connectivity and environmental sustaintability while centering scholarly dialogue. After gaining approval on July 19, 2022, from the Princeton Historic Preservation Commission for the proposed changes, the renovation took place during the following two years and was completed by June 2024. As Anne Levin reported in Princeton Magazine, "The renovated building reflects acknowledgement of the increasingly collaborative, technologically sophisticated way research is done today." Storrar retired as director on June 30, 2025.

On May 10, 2024, the Board of Trustees announced that Tom Greggs, the Marischal Professor of Divinity at the University of Aberdeen, would succeed Storrar as the director of CTI; he became director on July 1, 2025.

== Astrobiology controversy ==
In 2021, a public controversy broke out about the CTI's research program in astrobiology. The New York Post reported on December 27, 2021, that "NASA hired 24 theologians to study human reaction to aliens." The title of the article was misleading as NASA did not engage any theologians itself. As the Associated Press reported the following day, NASA did not hire any theologians directly; rather, NASA provided partial funding (along with the John Templeton Foundation) for a research inquiry in 2015–2018 at CTI about the societal implications of astrobiology.

== Leverhulme partnership ==
In January 2022, the Leverhulme Trust in the UK awarded Cambridge University a £10 million grant to establish a new research center, "the Leverhulme Centre for Life in the Universe." Directed by the Swiss astronomer, Didier Queloz, the new Center established ten year partnerships with five international institutions, including the Center of Theological Inquiry.

== Program ==
The Center of Theological Inquiry hosts members from theology and other disciplines for periods of concentrated research. In its early years, scholars worked on individual projects, sharing works-in-progress and receiving feedback from other members in residence. Since 2012, however, CTI has sponsored themed research inquiries that bring together scholars from different disciplines to analyze major issues of social concern.

The themed inquiries since 2012 are:

- 2012-13: Evolution & Human Nature
- 2013-14: Religious Experience & Moral Identity
- 2014-15: Law & Religious Freedom
- 2015-17: Societal Implications of Astrobiology
- 2017-18: Religion & Migration
- 2018-19: Religion & Violence
- 2019-20: Religion & Economic Inequality
- 2020-21: Religion & the Built Environment
- 2021-22: Religion & the Natural Environment
- 2022-25: Thriving in Diverse Contexts

The most recently completed inquiry is Thriving in Diverse Contexts: A Study Program on Psychological Science for Researchers in Christian Theology. The program, funded by the John Templeton Foundation, brings together two cohorts of theological scholars for a cross-training program in psychological science.

== Publications ==
- CTI has published a magazine titled Fresh Thinking since 2018
- CTI also produces a podcast called Theology Matters
