= Miroslav Volf =

Croatian-American theologian and academic

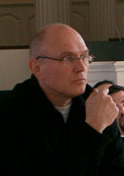
- Born: 25 September 1956 (age 69); Osijek, Croatia, Yugoslavia
- Occupation: Theologian
- Notable work: Allah: A Christian Response; After Our Likeness; Exclusion and Embrace; The End of Memory; Free of Charge
- Theological work
- Language: English, German, Croatian
- Tradition or movement: Anglicanism; Social trinitarianism
- Main interests: Systematic theology Political theology Community organizing Ecclesiology; Interfaith dialogue Globalization

Miroslav Volf (born September 25, 1956) is a Croatian Protestant theologian and public intellectual and Henry B. Wright Professor of Theology and director of the Yale Center for Faith and Culture at Yale University. He previously taught at the Evangelical Theological Seminary in his native Osijek, Croatia (1979–80, 1983–90) and Fuller Theological Seminary in Pasadena, California (1990–1998).

Having received two advanced degrees under the German theologian Jürgen Moltmann, Volf has been described as a "theological bridge builder." The main thrust of his theology is to bring Christian theology to bear on various realms of public life, such as culture, politics, and economics. He often explores dialogues between different groups in the world—such as between denominations, faiths, and ethnic groups.

Volf has served as an advisor for the White House Office of Faith-Based and Neighborhood Partnerships and for several years co-taught a course at Yale with former British prime minister Tony Blair on globalization. He is a frequent commentator on religious and cultural issues in popular media outlets such as CNN, NPR, and Al Jazeera. Volf won the 2002 University of Louisville and the Louisville Presbyterian Theological Seminary Grawemeyer Award in Religion and his 1996 book Exclusion and Embrace was named by Christianity Today as one of the 100 Most Influential Books of the Twentieth Century.

== Family and early life ==
Miroslav Volf was born on September 25, 1956, in Osijek, Croatia, which was then part of the Socialist Federal Republic of Yugoslavia. At the age of five his family moved to the multicultural city of Novi Sad, Serbia (then also part of Yugoslavia), where his father became a minister for the small Pentecostal community. Growing up as part of that community, Volf lived doubly on the margins: religiously, Osijek was predominantly Catholic and Novi Sad predominantly Serbian Orthodox; in both towns, Protestants were a small minority and Pentecostals were "a minority of a minority". Politically, Yugoslavia was dominated by Marxist ideology and Christian ministers were particularly suspect and carefully monitored. Volf later recalled about his childhood that he did not have the luxury of "entertaining faith merely as a set of propositions that you do or don't assent to". In school, especially in his early teens, the faith of his parents and their community was a heavy burden; Volf's sense of being different from his peers and from the larger culture around him caused him "almost unbearable shame" and he rebelled against faith. In his mid teens, however, he had a quiet conversion. As the only openly Christian student in his high school, he had to explain why and how the Christian faith makes sense intellectually.

== Early influences and education ==
Volf studied philosophy and classical Greek at the University of Zagreb and theology at Zagreb's Evangelical-Theological Seminary. He graduated summa cum laude in 1977 with a thesis on Ludwig Feuerbach. The same year he started working on his M.A. at Fuller Theological Seminary in Pasadena, California, and graduated summa cum laude in 1979. During the interim year back in Yugoslavia between his masters and doctoral study, he continued studying philosophy at the University of Belgrade.

From 1980 to 1985 Volf pursued a doctorate at the University of Tübingen, Germany, under the supervision of Jürgen Moltmann (with compulsory military service back in Yugoslavia interrupting his studies from October 1983 to October 1984). For most of this time he had an ecumenical scholarship from the Diakonisches Werk and lived in the Evangelisches Stift. His dissertation was a theological engagement with Karl Marx's philosophy of labor, and pursuing this project led him to study both German idealist philosophy and English political economy. He graduated again summa cum laude, and the University of Tübingen awarded him the Leopold Lukas Nachwuchswissenschaftler Preis for his dissertation.

In 1989 he received a scholarship from the Alexander von Humboldt Foundation and started working on his Habilitation (a post-doctoral degree required by many continental European universities for a call to a professorship). The Habilitation was on "Trinity and Communion", a topic stimulated by Volf's long standing involvement in the official dialogue between the Vatican's Council for Promoting Christian Unity and the international Pentecostal movement. He was awarded this degree in 1994.

== Teaching ==
In 1979, Volf began his teaching career as a lecturer in systematic theology at his alma mater in Croatia. Doctoral studies and compulsory military service interrupted his regular teaching, though he continued to offer intensive courses at the same institution. After submitting his doctoral dissertation, Volf returned to full-time teaching. From 1984 until 1991 he served as professor of systematic theology at the Evangelical-Theological Seminary, which had by then moved to his native Osijek.

In 1991, Volf took a position as an Associate Professor of Systematic Theology at Fuller, succeeding his former teacher at that institution, Paul King Jewett. He remained in this position until 1997 when Fuller appointed him to a full professorship. Throughout this time, he continued to teach in Osijek, as his contract with Fuller included provisions for teaching two courses every year in Croatia. In 1998 Volf took the position of Henry B. Wright Professor of Theology at Yale Divinity School in New Haven, Connecticut.

== Theological work ==
Since Volf considers theology to be an articulation of a way of life, his theological writing is marked by a sense of the unity between systematic theology and biblical interpretation, between dogmatics and ethics, and between what is called "church theology" (e.g., Karl Barth and, later, Stanley Hauerwas) and "political/public theology" (e.g., Jürgen Moltmann and David Tracy). His contributions to theology have for the most part been topical; he has written on human work, the nature of Christian community, the problem of otherness, violence and reconciliation, the question of memory, and the public role of faith, to name a few issues. But in all his writings, he sought to bring the integrated whole of Christian convictions to bear on the topics at hand.

The systematic contours of Volf's theology are most clearly visible in Free of Charge. A former Archbishop of Canterbury, Rowan Williams, commissioned the book as his 2006 Lent Book. Its immediate themes are giving and forgiving as two chief modes of grace, but the book is an accessible introduction and invitation to the Christian faith. In this work, the central themes of Volf's work that receive more in depth treatment in other texts—God as unconditional love, the trinitarian nature of God, creation as gift, Christ's death on the cross for the ungodly, justification by faith and communal nature of Christian life, love of enemy and care for the downtrodden, reconciliation and forgiveness, and hope for a world of love—come together into a unity. Because it contains frequent reflections on concrete experiences, the book makes visible that Volf's theology both grows out of and leads to a life of faith. Of all his books, Free of Charge bears the strongest mark of the young Martin Luther's influence.

=== Christian faith and economics ===
The first phase of Volf's academic work began with his dissertation and continued through the eighties. His concern then was the relationship between Christian faith and the economy, and in particular the nature and purpose of human everyday work. In his dissertation he engaged Karl Marx and it was published in an abbreviated form as Zukunft der Arbeit—Arbeit der Zukunft: Der Marxsche Arbeitsbegriff und seine theologische Wertung (1988), making a contribution not just to a critical theological evaluation on Marx's philosophy, but also to Marx studies (notably with regard to the influence of Feuerbach on Marx' theory of economic alienation and affinities between the late Fichte's ideas and Marx' conceptualization of communist society).

In the process of writing the dissertation, Volf formulated an alternative theology of work, primarily situated in ecclesiology and eschatology, rather than in the doctrine of creation or of salvation, and associated with the Third, rather than the First or Second person of the Trinity. Volf breaks with the long tradition of Protestant thinking about work as "vocation" (both Luther and Calvin, as well as Puritans and later theologians, including Karl Barth, advocated it), and proposes "charisma" as the central theological category with the help of which human work is to be understood. This line of thinking provides a flexible theological account of work, suited for dynamic contemporary societies in which people engage in multiple kinds of work over the course of a life-time, and better coordinated with the multiplicity of ministries that each person can have in the church. Volf published the new, pneumatological account of work in Work in the Spirit: Toward a Theology of Work (1991).

As a result of his academic work on faith and economics, Volf took on the task as the main drafter of the Oxford Declaration on Faith and Economics (1990). Working groups from various parts of the world sent papers to Volf's desk, and the text he prepared on the basis of those papers was discussed, amended, and finally adopted at a conference in 1990 by a wide array of Christian leaders, theologians, philosophers, ethicists, economists, development practitioners, and political scientists (Gerechtigkeit, Geist und Schöpfung. Die Oxford-Erklärung zur Frage von Glaube und Wirtschaft, eds. Herman Sauter and Miroslav Volf, 1992; Christianity and Economics in the Post-Cold War Era: The Oxford Declaration and Beyond, ed. H. Schlossberg, 1994). His own charismatic account of work has found endorsement in that document.

=== Trinity and community ===
In 1985 Volf became a member of the Pentecostal side of the official Roman Catholic and Pentecostal dialogue. The theme of the dialogue for the five years that followed was communio, and, together with Peter Kuzmič, Volf wrote the first position paper. In the final year of the dialogue (1989), along with Hervé Legrand, then a professor at the Institut Catholique in Paris, on the Catholic side, he was the main drafter of the final document ("Perspectives on Koinonia"). This intense ecumenical engagement led Volf to explore the relation between the church as a community and the Trinity, and this topic became the subject of his Habilitationschrift.

The dissertation was published as "Trinität und Gemeinschaft: Eine Ökumenische Ekklesiologie" (1996; translated into English as "After Our Likeness: The Church as the Image of the Triune God", 1998). Volf seeks to both show that a Free church ecclesiology is a theologically legitimate form of ecclesiology (a proposition denied by both Roman Catholic and Orthodox official teaching) and to give that typically individualistic ecclesiology focused on the lordship of Christ a more robustly communal character by tying it to the communal nature of God. Volf takes Joseph Ratzinger (Catholic, current pope emeritus Benedict XVI) and John Zizioulas (Orthodox bishop) as his dialogue partners, and critiques their anchoring of the communal and hierarchical nature of the church in hierarchical Trinitarian relations (both thinkers gives primacy to the "One", though each does this in a different way). As an alternative, Volf proposes a non-hierarchical account of church as a community rooted in an egalitarian understanding of the Trinity (since hierarchy is, in his judgment, unthinkable with regard to three equally divine persons). Each member of the church has "charisms" for the common good of all in the church, without the strict need of the "one" to symbolize and guarantee unity (though the "one" might be needed for pragmatic rather than dogmatic reasons). Volf's position is not, however, that hierarchical forms of ecclesiology are illegitimate. Though not ultimately ideal, in certain cultural settings hierarchical forms of the church may even be the best possible and therefore preferable ways of reflecting in the church the Trinitarian communion of the one God.

Parallel with pursuing these internal ecclesiological issues in light of ecumenical concerns, Volf explored the nature of the church's presence and engagement in the world—partly to connect his "charismatic" understanding of mundane work (Work in the Spirit) with his "charismatic" understanding of the church (After Our Likeness). In a series of articles he developed an account of the church's presence in the world as a "soft" and "internal" difference—roughly in contrast with either the "hard" difference of typically separatist (often Anabaptist) and transformationist (often Reformed) positions or the "attenuated difference" of those who tend to identify church and culture with each other (often Catholic and Orthodox stances) He has taken up and further developed this position in A Public Faith (2011). He sums it up as follows: "Christian identity in a given culture is always a complex and flexible network of small and large refusals, divergences, subversions, and more or less radical and encompassing alternative proposals and enactments, surrounded by the acceptance of many cultural givens. There is no single way to relate to a given culture as a whole or even to its dominant thrust; there are only numerous ways of accepting, transforming, or replacing various aspects of a given culture from within".

=== Exclusion and Embrace ===
Volf is probably best known for Exclusion and Embrace: A Theological Exploration of Identity, Otherness, and Reconciliation (1996). It won the prestigious Grawemeyer Award for religion in 2002, and Christianity Today included it among its 100 most influential religious books of the twentieth century. The book grew out of a lecture Volf gave in Berlin in 1993, in which his task was to reflect theologically about the Yugoslav Wars, marked by ethnic cleansing, that was raging in his home country at the time.

Exclusion and Embrace deals with the challenges of reconciliation in contexts of persisting enmity in which no clear line can be drawn between victims and perpetrators and in which today's victims become tomorrow's perpetrators—conditions that arguably describe the majority of the world's conflicts. The evocative "embrace" is the central category of the book, and Volf proposed it as an alternative to "liberation" (a category favored by a variety of liberation theologies). Embrace is marked by two key stances: acting with generosity toward the perpetrator and maintaining porous boundaries of flexible identities. Even though it is a modality of grace, "embrace" does not stand in contrast to justice; it includes justice as a dimension of grace extended toward wrongdoers. "Embrace" also does not stand in contrast to boundary maintenance. On the contrary, it presumes that it is essential to maintain the self's boundaries (and therefore pass judgment), but suggests that these boundaries ought to be porous, so that the self, while not being obliterated, can make a journey with the other in reconciliation and mutual enrichment. Volf sees the father in the story of the prodigal son as an exemplar of this stance (the father forgave and accepted the change in his identity as "the-father-of-the-prodigal"). But supremely the stance is exemplified in the death of Christ on the cross for the ungodly (Christ, who assumed humanity, forgave and opened his arms to embrace). Central to Volf's theology of the cross is Christ's death as an "inclusive substitute" for the ungodly, which is to say Christ's dying for them and making space "in God" for them. "Solidarity with victims", central to his teacher Jürgen Moltmann's "theology of the cross", though dislodged from the center in Volf's proposal, still remains a key aspect of God's embrace of humanity.

For Volf, the practice of "embrace" is ultimately rooted in God's trinitarian nature—in God's love, which is unconditional because it is the very being of God, and in the mutual indwelling of the divine persons (whose boundaries are therefore reciprocally porous). He succinctly articulated the Trinitarian underpinnings of his proposal in "The Trinity is Our Social Program", a text in which he both argues for a correspondence (on account of God's indwelling presence) between God's trinitarian nature and human relations and stances, and underscores the ineradicable limitations of such correspondences. The primary limitation consists in the fact that, obviously, human beings are not God; the second consists in the fact that human beings are—equally obviously—sinful, which requires the human "embrace" to be an eschatological category. Volf's main contribution to eschatology, partly triggered by making "embrace" an eschatological category, is his re-thinking of the "Last Judgment." In "The Final Reconciliation" Volf argued that the Last Judgment ought to be understood as the final reconciliation in which judgment is not eliminated but seen as an indispensable element of reconciliation, a portal into the world of love.

=== The End of Memory ===
A central concern in Exclusion and Embrace is truth-telling in the context of enmity and conflict, especially truth-telling about the past. Volf's The End Of Memory (2006) explores this theme in much greater depth. He argues that it isn’t enough that we remember the past (as Elie Wiesel, for instance, has done), but that we must remember the past rightly. There is a pragmatic and not just a cognitive dimension to memory. Memories concerned merely with the truth of what happened and oriented exclusively toward justice often become untruthful and unjust memories; the "shield" of memory then morphs into a "sword," as can be seen in many parts of the world, including the region in which Volf grew up. The proper goal of memory should be reconciliation—"embrace"—which includes justice. In a novel move, Volf proposes that the sacred memory of Christ's passion and resurrection, properly understood, should guide Christians’ remembering of wrongs committed and suffered.

The most controversial part of The End of Memory is Volf's sustained theological argument, developed in dialogue with Sigmund Freud, Friedrich Nietzsche, and Søren Kierkegaard, that remembering wrongs suffered and committed, if done rightly, will ultimately result in non-remembrance of the wrongdoing. The world of love, which is the Christian eschatological hope, will be realized when people and their relationships are healed to such an extent that former wrongdoing would, for lack of affective fuel, no longer come to mind.

Volf traveled domestically and internationally and spoke extensively on issues of reconciliation—in China, India, Sri Lanka, Israel, South Africa, New Zealand, various European countries, and, of course, the United States. For instance, on the morning of 9/11/2001, at 8:34am when the first plane had hit the North Tower, he was finishing his keynote address at the International Prayer Breakfast at the United Nations. His topic was "From Exclusion to Embrace: Reflections on Reconciliation."

=== Interpretation of scripture ===
An important feature of Volf's work is the theological interpretation of the scriptures. He believes that any theology—whether it be "liberal" or "evangelical", whether it be Roman Catholic, Orthodox, or Protestant—will wither if not nourished through Scriptural engagement and interpretation. Though the interpretation of biblical texts is not the exclusive or even primary mode of his theological work (as it is, for instance, for David F. Ford [with his "scriptural reasoning" project] or Michael Welker [with his "realistic biblical theology" project]), many of his books contain sustained engagement with biblical texts. In Captive to the Word of God: Engaging the Scriptures for Contemporary Theological Reflection (2010) he has given both an account of why theological interpretation of biblical texts matters and how it should be undertaken and offered examples of such interpretations (dealing with John's Gospel and Epistles, 1 Peter, Ecclesiastes, St. Paul's writings). But many of his books—notably Exclusion and Embrace—contain sections with biblical interpretations.

=== Interfaith engagement ===
Volf has brought his theology of embrace to bear on how people of different faiths relate to each other. He participated actively in the work of The Elijah Interfaith Institute by writing Christian position papers—both on his own and with his students as co-authors—for the meetings of its Board of Religious Leaders and by participating in its meeting. For a number of years, Volf also participated in the Jewish–Christian dialogue. However, most of his interfaith efforts are directed to the relation between Christianity and Islam. He focuses on Islam partially because he comes from a region in which these two faiths have intersected for centuries (he was born in a city-fortress that the Holy Roman Emperor, Leopold I started building around 1700 to keep Ottoman Muslims at bay) and partly because he considers the relations between these two religions to be today's most critical interfaith issue.

Since 2004 Volf has taken part in the Building Bridges Seminar, a yearly gathering of Muslim and Christian scholars chaired until 2012 by the Archbishop of Canterbury, Rowan Williams. His engagement with Islam intensified after the publication of A Common Word Between Us and You (2007). Occasioned by Pope Benedict XVI's speech at the University of Regensburg, but motivated by a deteriorated relationship between Christians and Muslims (especially in the wake of 9/11), the document, which was originally signed by 138 of the world's most prominent Muslim leaders, argued that what binds Muslims and Christians (and Jews, of course) is the dual command to love God and love one's neighbors. It proposes this common ground as a place of dialogue and cooperation between the two religions. Along with the staff at the Center for Faith and Culture (Joseph Cumming and Andrew Saperstein), Volf drafted Yale Divinity School's response ("Yale Response"), which was endorsed by over 300 prominent Christian leaders (including some of the world's most respected evangelical figures such as John Stott and Rick Warren).

Allah: A Christian Response (2011) is Volf's major work engaging Islam. The book is an exercise in "political theology"; it explores the possibilities of peaceful co-existence of Muslims and Christians "under the same political roof," rather than the merits of Islam and Christianity as systems of salvation (an area in which there is substantially more divergence between the two religions than in regard to moral values). The central question of the book is whether Muslims and Christians have a common God and whether, consequently, they have common or at least overlapping central values. In a dialogue with Nicholas of Cusa and Martin Luther, Volf develops his own method of assessing the issue and argues that Muslims and Christians do have a common God, even though each group understands God in different ways, at least in part. The most obvious differences concern the Christian belief that God is Love and that God is the Holy Trinity (though when it comes to the Trinity, Volf argues that Muslims objections seem directed at ideas that the great Christian teachers never actually affirmed). These differences notwithstanding, Christians and Muslims have similar accounts of the moral character of God and therefore of basic human values—the one Creator God who is different from the world is just and merciful, and God commands worshipers to do similar things (e.g., the Ten Commandments [minus the Fourth]; the Golden Rule). Love for and fear of that common God can, therefore, bring Muslims and Christians together, or at least be the basis for resolving conflicts without resorting to violence. As Volf sees it, in Allah as well as in his engagement with Islam more broadly, he is applying to interfaith relations the kind of generous engagement with the other that his theology of embrace recommends.

== Church theologian ==
Volf started preaching early, before he was 18. While living in his native Croatia, he often taught in the church and served for a brief period as interim pastor of a church in Zagreb. In the United States, he continued to preach and teach in churches as well as appear on Christian radio and TV programs. True to his reputation as a "theologian of the bridge," he addressed a wide variety of types of church groups, ranging from speaking to the conference of Episcopal bishops to preaching at Robert Schuller's Hour of Power, from teaching for the Trinity Wall Street Church to giving an hour-long interview to James Kennedy Radio ministries, and much in between (such as speaking at conferences of Covenant, Adventist, Vineyard or "Emergent Church" pastors and church workers).

While doing his doctoral work and teaching in Croatia, Volf worked for the Croatian Christian monthly Ivori, re-designing and re-branding the magazine his father, then General Secretary of the Pentecostal Church in Yugoslavia, was publishing. As the magazine's co-editor (1979–84) and editor (1984–89), he regularly wrote editorials and feature articles. These took up themes and staked out positions he would later develop in academic publications. Some of these texts were on issues at the intersection between faith and culture (as, for instance, those dealing with the religious dimensions of the poetry of the Serbian poet Aleksa Šantić, which were the seed for his first book, done in collaboration with the Croatian painter Marko Živković and titled I znam da sunce ne boji se tame ["The Sun Doesn’t Fear Darkness"]. Other texts were theological interpretations of biblical texts, notably of 1 Peter. Interest in culture broadly construed and in theological interpretation remained a significant feature of Volf's theological work from then on, as did his commitment to writing for the church and not just for the academy.

When Volf moved to the United States, he continued to write for church audiences. He wrote occasional articles and gave interviews for Christianity Today, and for many years he wrote a regular column "Faith Matters" for The Christian Century (the collection of these is published as Against the Tide: Love in a Time of Petty Dreams and Great Enmities [2010]).

== Public theologian ==
Volf's theological work is predicated on the conviction that "private" and "public" spheres cannot be separated, though they must be distinguished. In recent years he has given increasing attention to the public dimensions and roles of faith.

From 2008-2011 Volf taught a course on "Faith and Globalization" with former British prime minister Tony Blair, an interdisciplinary course for students from all parts of Yale University. The assumption of the course was that globalization processes and faith traditions are some of the most powerful forces shaping today's world and that the world's future depends to a significant degree on how faiths relate to globalization and how, in the context of globalization, faiths relate to each other. Many themes of Volf's work so far came together in this course—the relation between faith and economics, faith and reconciliation (and violence), interfaith relations, faith and politics (in particular, defense of democratic pluralism), and so on. Through this course and in his work with globalization more broadly, Volf is seeking to think through all these issues not from a generically human standpoint suspended above concrete traditions—which he believes does not exist—but from the perspective of the Christian faith.

In A Public Faith: How Followers of Christ Should Serve the Common Good (2011) Volf summed up his reflections over the years on how Christians should interact with the surrounding culture broadly conceived. He contends that with regard to the public realm Christians face two major dangers ("malfunctions of faith," in his terminology): one is to withdraw from public life and to leave their faith "idling" in all spheres outside their private and church lives; the other is to be engaged, but to do so in a coercive way, shoving the demands of their faith down the throats of those who embrace other faiths or no faith at all. Positively, Volf argues against two extremes: against a complete separation of faith from public life, a kind of secularist exclusion of religion from public realm (and sectarian self-isolation), and against a complete saturation of public life by one dominant religion, a kind of religious totalitarianism. Against both secular exclusivists and religious totalitarians he contends that, in a world in which many faiths often live under a common roof, freedom of religion and the Golden Rule should guide how faiths relate to each other in the public space. As to the Christians’ own engagement, Volf contends that there is no single Christian way to relate to the broader culture as a whole. Instead, while remaining true to the convictions of their own faith, Christians should approach their larger cultures in an ad-hoc way, accepting or partly changing some aspects of culture, possibly completely withdrawing from still others, and cheerfully celebrating many others.

Over the years, in diverse settings Volf has brought faith to bear on a variety of more public issues. Examples include the following: He was a member of the Global Agenda Council on Faith and on Values of the World Economic Forum (2009–2011); he worked with the Advisory Council of President Obama's Office of Faith-based and Neighborhood Partnerships; he gave a keynote address at the International Prayer Breakfast at the United Nations (on 9/11) and spoke at the National Prayer Breakfast in Washington (2010); he delivered a keynote address at the international Military Chief of Chaplains conference in Cape Town, South Africa (2008). He is also present in the media, giving interviews to major news organizations in this country (for instance, NPR, CNN, MSNBC) and abroad (for instance, Al Jazeera, HRT).

In 2003, Volf founded the Yale Center for Faith and Culture housed at Yale Divinity School. The goal of the center, which he still directs, is to promote the practice of faith in all spheres of life through theological research and leadership development.

== Honors, grants, and lectureships ==
=== Honors and grants ===
- Leopold Lukas Junior Scholar Award, University of Tübingen (1990)
- Alexander von Humboldt Stipend (1989–91, 1993)
- One of only five academic theologians named among the "50 Evangelical Leaders 40 and under", Christianity Today (1996)
- One of the 100 most influential books in 20th century for Exclusion and Embrace by Christianity Today
- Pew Evangelical Research Fellowship (1998–99)
- Center of Theological Inquiry Fellow (1998–99)
- Grawemeyer Award for Religion for Exclusion and Embrace (2002)
- Lilly Grant for Sustaining Pastoral Excellence, 2003–2007

=== Lectureships ===
- Waldenstroem Lectures, Stockholm School of Theology (1998)
- Laidlaw Lectures, Knox College, Toronto (1999)
- Gray Lectures, Duke University Divinity School (2001)
- Stob Lectures, Calvin College (2002)
- Robertson Lectures, University of Glasgow (2003)
- Raynolds Lecture, Princeton University (2004)
- Dudleian Lecture, Harvard University Divinity School (2004)
- Stilman Lecture, Wake Forrest University (2005)
- Ryan Lectures, Asbury Theological Seminary (2005)
- Laingh Lectures, Regent College, Canada (2006)
- Ernest Lau Lectures, Trinity Theological College, Singapore (2008)
- Gifford Lectures, University of Aberdeen (2025)

== Personal life ==
Volf was previously married to New Testament scholar Judith Gundry; the marriage ended in divorce. He lives in Guilford, Connecticut, with his second wife, Jessica (married January 2012), and his daughter, Mira. He has partial custody of his two sons, Nathanael and Aaron, who live with their mother four days a week and their father three days a week, according to their divorce settlement. He is a member of the Episcopal Church in the U.S.

== Bibliography ==
=== Books ===
Life Worth Living: A Guide to What Matters Most. With Matthew Croasmun and Ryan McAnnally-Linz. The Open Field / A Penguin Life Book, Penguin Random House, 2023. https://www.lifeworthlivingbook.com

- Translations: 8 languages, including Arabic, Chinese, Korean, German, and Portuguese https://divinity.yale.edu/news/2023-04-13-new-faculty-book-on-keys-to-a-meaningful-life-generates-lightning-public-response

Flourishing: Why We Need Religion in a Globalized World. New Haven: Yale University Press, 2016.

- Translations: Italian

Allah: A Christian Response. New York: HarperOne, 2011.

- Translations: Dutch

A Public Faith: How Followers of Christ Should Serve the Common Good. Grand Rapids: Brazos Press, 2011.

- Translations: Korean, German and Chinese
- Awards: One of the top 100 books of 2011 by Publishers Weekly and included in the Top 10 Religion Books; Nautilus Silver Award in the Religion and Spirituality – Western Traditions category [2012]; ForeWord’s silver recipient in 'Religion' [2012]).

Captive to the Word of God: Engaging the Scriptures for Contemporary Theological Reflection. Grand Rapids: Eerdmans, 2010.

Against the Tide: Love in a Time of Petty Dreams and Persisting Enmities. Grand Rapids, MI: Eerdmans, 2009.

The End of Memory: Remembering Rightly in a Violent World. Grand Rapids: Eerdmans, 2006.

- Translations: Portuguese, Dutch, and Chinese
- Awards: Christianity Today Book Award in category "Culture" for 2007

Free of Charge: Giving and Forgiving in a Culture Stripped of Grace. Grand Rapids: Zondervan, 2005

- Translations: Dutch, German and Chinese
- Awards: Archbishop of Canterbury 2006 Lent book

After Our Likeness: The Church as an Image of the Triune God. Grand Rapids: Eerdmans, 1998. Translated from German, Trinität und Gemeinschaft: Eine Ökumenische Ekklesiologie (Mainz/Neukirchen-Vluyn: Grünewald Verlag/Neukirchener Verlag, 1996).

- Other translations: Croatian, Hungarian, Korean, and Russian

Exclusion and Embrace: A Theological Exploration of Identity, Otherness, and Reconciliation. Nashville: Abingdon, 1996.

- Translations: Croatian, Czech, German, Hungarian, Macedonian, Chinese, Russian, and Korean
- Awards: Christianity Today Book Award for 1996; Christianity Today one of the 100 most influential books in 20th century; Grawemeyer Award for Religion, 2002

Work in the Spirit: Toward a Theology of Work. New York: Oxford University Press, 1991 (reprinted by Wipf and Stock Publishers, 2001).

- Translations: Chinese

Zukunft der Arbeit – Arbeit der Zukunft: Der Arbeitsbegriff bei Karl Marx und seine theologische Wertung. München/Mainz: Chr. Kaiser Verlag, 1988.

- Translations: Croatian and Korean

I Znam da sunce ne boji se tame: Teoloske meditacije o Santicevu vjerskom pjesnistvu. Osijek: Izvori, 1986.

=== Edited works ===
Do We Worship the Same God?: Jews, Muslims, and Christians in Dialogue. Grand Rapids: Eerdmans, 2012.

With Ghazi bin Muhammad and Melissa Yarington, A Common Word: Muslims and Christians on Loving God and Neighbor. Grand Rapids, MI: Eerdmans, 2009.

With Michael Welker, God’s Life in the Trinity. Minneapolis: Fortress Press, 2006.

With Michael Welker, Der lebendinge Gott als Trinitaet. Jürgen Moltmann zum 80: Geburtstag. Guetersloh: Guetersloher Verlagshaus, 2006.

With William Katerberg, The Future of Hope: Christian Tradition amid Modernity and Postmodernity. Grand Rapids: Eerdmans, 2004.

With Dorothy Bass, Practicing Theology. Beliefs and Practices in Christian Life. Grand Rapids: Eerdmans, 2002.

A Passion for God’s Reign: Theology, Christian Learning, and Christian Self. Grand Rapids: Eerdmans, 1998

With T. Kucharz and C. Krieg, The Future of Theology: Essays in Honor of Jürgen Moltmann. Grand Rapids: Eerdmans, 1996 (translated into German).

With Hermann Sautter, Gerechtigkeit, Geist und Schöpfung: Die Oxford‐Erklärung zur Frage von Glaude und Wirtschaft. Wuppertal: Brockhaus Verlag, 1992.
