= Peter W. Ochs =

American academic

Peter Ochs
- Born: Peter W. Ochs; 1950 (age 75–76)
- Occupations: Judaic studies professor theologian
- Spouse: Vanessa L. Ochs
- Children: Elizabeth; Juliana
- Theological work
- Language: English
- Main interests: Jewish philosophy Jewish theology Philosophical theology Pragmatism; Semiotics
- Notable ideas: Scriptural reasoning

Peter W. Ochs (born 1950) is the Edgar M. Bronfman Professor of Modern Judaic Studies at the University of Virginia, where he has served since 1997. He is an influential thinker whose interests include Jewish philosophy and theology, modern and postmodern philosophical theology, pragmatism, and semiotics. Ochs coined the term "scriptural reasoning" and is the co-founder (with Anglican theologian David F. Ford) of the Society for Scriptural Reasoning, which promotes interfaith dialog among Christians, Jews, and Muslims through scriptural study groups. He is also a co-founder of the Children of Abraham Institute, which promotes interfaith study and dialog among members of the Abrahamic religions.

== Biography ==
Ochs received his B.A. and Ph.D. from Yale University, and M.A. from the Jewish Theological Seminary of America. He has held teaching positions at Drew University, Colgate University, and the University of Maryland, College Park, and has been a Fulbright Senior Lecturer in Philosophy at the Hebrew University of Jerusalem and a visiting lecturer at Hebrew Union College-Jewish Institute of Religion.

In addition to teaching Modern Judaic Studies at the University of Virginia, Ochs directs Religious Studies graduate programs in "Scripture, Interpretation, and Practice", an interdisciplinary approach to the Abrahamic traditions.

Ochs is an author who has written around a dozen books and hundreds of articles, reviews, and book chapters. He is series co-editor (with Christian theologian Stanley Hauerwas) of Radical Traditions: Theology in a postcritical key, published by Westview Press/HarperCollins and SCM Press/Eerdmans, and series co-editor (with Stanley Hauerwas and Ibrahim Moosa) of Encountering Traditions, published by Stanford University Press.

== Contribution ==
=== Scriptural reasoning ===
Ochs was one of the original members of a small group of Jewish philosophers who called themselves "textual reasoners". Textual reasoning evolved into a larger movement which Ochs dubbed "scriptural reasoning", and Ochs co-founded the Society for Scriptural Reasoning in 1995 together with David F. Ford and Daniel W. Hardy. The goal of the organization is to build consensus and promote reconciliation among Christians, Jews, and Muslims through shared discussion of the scriptures. In a panel discussion on the Public Broadcasting Service with Muslim theologian Mehdi Aminrazavi, professor of philosophy and religion at the University of Mary Washington in Fredericksburg, Virginia, Ochs proposed scriptural reasoning as a new approach to achieving peace in the Arab–Israeli conflict. He observed that all the religious Muslims, Christians and Jews involved in the conflict worship the same God of Abraham, and therefore might be brought together "to share what they believe and to act in relation to what's going on".

In 2008 Ochs founded and became the director of the "1000 Cities Project" for the Society for Scriptural Reasoning, with the goal of establishing Christian-Jewish-Muslim study groups throughout North America.

=== Peirce, pragmatism, and the logic of scripture ===
Ochs criticizes lingering elements of transcendentalism in Charles Peirce as a problematic (and un-pragmatic) conceptualism. Nevertheless, Ochs' own philosophy has a definite regressive ('transcendental') direction, but this regressive movement of thought is always made through abductions whose validity can only be demonstrated in their actual fruitfulness in the context of a particular community of inquiry. Ochs' pragmatism privileges the late Peirce of 1905 lectures on Pragmaticism and concomitant texts. For Ochs, Peirce's Critical Common-Sensism means that only real doubts may be productive of inquiry, and these doubts can be resolved only with respect to vague but indubitable habits. 'Indubitable' beliefs remain fallible, however, in the sense that later inquiry might give us cause to doubt them. For Ochs', then, the synthetic a priori is transformed into fallibilistic common-sense principles. Ochs also insists on a mathematical-diagrammatic dimension to Peirce's thought, a dimension that Ochs' theological interpreters have tended to neglect. Mathematics is the science of the possible (not, as for Kant, the science of the necessary forms of intuition, i.e. of real objects). All new ideas are, strictly speaking, mathematical; but these ideas can only be validly applied to real experience through the logic of scientific inquiry.

Ochs argues that Peirce discovers, late in his career, that pragmatism must always take the form of self-critique (which includes critique of Peirce's own historical roots—Kant, Descartes, scholastic). Textually, this claim is based largely on Peirce's genre choices: his use of autobiography to introduce his pragmaticism and his use of the dialogue form to present his pragmaticism as a response to the errors of would-be pragmatists. Philosophically, Ochs' insistence that inquiry be rooted in a particular community of inquiry seems itself to be rooted in a few basic features of Peirce's thought:

- The insistence on real doubts, i.e. doubts that arise in the context of a particular organism's problem, ultimately manifested through some suffering. This problem will be context- and tradition-specific (although with greater or lesser generality).
- The irreducibly vague character of signs, including our indubitable perceptions and corrective A-reasonings. Vague signs which 'await further determination in terms of some other signs' can only be determined in a particular context (which is to say, in a dialogic relation to other signs). For this reason, the clarification of vagueness cannot take place without specification of a particular context and a process that is semiotically equivalent to commentary.

=== Children of Abraham Institute ===
In 2002 Ochs co-founded and became co-director of The Children of Abraham Institute (CHAI), which promotes interfaith scriptural scholarship as a means for fostering peace and harmony. The institute maintains centers at the St Ethelburga's Centre for Reconciliation and Peace, London; the Cambridge Inter-faith Programme; and student study groups at the University of Cambridge, University of Virginia, and Eastern Mennonite University.

=== Dabru Emet ===
Ochs was one of the four drafters (together with David Novak, Tikva Frymer-Kensky, and Michael Signer) of a full-page advertisement which appeared in the Sunday, 10 September 2000 edition of The New York Times, titled "Dabru Emet (Speak Truth): A Jewish statement on Christians and Christianity", which publicized eight theological statements. The statement was signed by more than 150 rabbis and Jewish scholars from across the religious spectrum.

=== Editorial work ===
Ochs is the founding editor of the Journal of Scriptural Reasoning, founded in 2001, and editor and chair of the editorial board of the Journal of Textual Reasoning since 2002.

Also in 2001, he founded and serves as co-editor for the electronic journal La Pensee Juive de Langue Francaise. He is a member of the editorial board of Modern Theology (since 1993), Theology Today (since 2006), and CrossCurrents (since 1991).

== Personal life ==
He is married to Vanessa L. Ochs, professor emerita in the Department of Religious Studies and Jewish Studies Program at the University of Virginia and a published author. They have two grown daughters, Elizabeth and Juliana.

== Publications ==
=== Books, monographs ===
- Ochs, Peter (1990). Understanding the Rabbinic Mind: Essays on the Hermeneutic of Max Kadushin. Atlanta: Scholars Press. ISBN 1-55540-544-4.
- Griffin, David Ray; Cobb Jr., John B.; Ford, Marcus P.; Gunter, Pete A.Y.; Ochs, Peter (1993). Founders of Constructive Postmodern Philosophy: Peirce, James, Bergson, Whitehead, and Hartshorne. Albany: State University of New York Press. ISBN 0-7914-1333-0.
- Ochs, Peter (1993). The Return to Scripture in Judaism and Christianity: Essays in Postcritical Scriptural Interpretation. Mahwah, N.J.: Paulist Press. ISBN 0-8091-3425-X.
- Ochs, Peter (1998). Peirce, Pragmatism, and the Logic of Scripture. Cambridge University Press. ISBN 0-521-57041-7.
- Kepnes, Steven Kepnes; Ochs, Peter; Gibbs, Robert (1998). Reasoning After Revelation: Dialogues in Postmodern Jewish Philosophy. Boulder and San Francisco: Westview Press. ISBN 0-8133-6565-1.
- Ochs, Peter; Borowitz, Eugene B. (2000). Reviewing the Covenant: Eugene Borowitz and the Postmodern Renewal of Jewish Theology. Albany: SUNY Press. ISBN 0-7914-4533-X.
- Frymer-Kensky, Tikva; Novak, David; Ochs, Peter; Sandmel, David; Signer, Michael (September 2000). Christianity in Jewish Terms. Boulder, Colo.: Westview Press. ISBN 0-8133-6572-4.
- Ochs, Peter; Levene, Nancy (2003). Textual Reasonings: Jewish Philosophy and Text Study at the end of the Twentieth Century. London: William B. Eerdmans Pub. Co.
- Ochs, Peter; Cartwright, Michael (2003). The Jewish-Christian Schism Revisited. London: William B. Eerdmans Pub. Co. ISBN 0802813623.
- Halivni, David; Ochs, Peter (2007). Breaking the Tablets: Jewish Theology After the Shoah. Rowman & Littlefield. ISBN 978-0-7425-5220-3.
- Ochs, Peter; Johnson, William Stacy (2009). Crisis, Call, and Leadership in the Abrahamic Traditions. Palgrave Macmillan. ISBN 978-0-230-61825-1. "peter ochs."
- Ochs, Peter; Ford, Deborah; Ford, David (2010). Wording a Radiance: Parting Conversations on God and the Church. SCM Press.
- Ochs, Peter (2010). The Free Church and Israel's Covenant. Winnipeg, CA: Canadian Mennonite University.
- Ochs, Peter (2011). Another Reformation: Postliberal Christianity and the Jews. Baker Publishing Group. ISBN 978-0-8010-3940-9.
- Ochs, Peter (2019). Religion Without Violence: The Philosophy and Practice of Scriptural Reasoning Wipf & Stock Press/Cascade.

=== Selected articles ===
- "Charles Peirce's Metaphysical Equivalent of War," Transactions of the Charles S. Peirce Society (Fall, 1981): 247–258.
- "The Liberal Arts Disease: A Neo-Scholastic Cure," Soundings LXV.4 (Winter 1982): 465–475.
- "The Religion of Liberal Humanism," The NICM Journal VIII.2 (Summer 1983): 93–105.
- "The Religion of Academia," Modern Age XXVIII.4 (Fall, 1984): 321–329.
- "A Guide to the Perplexed Jewish Woman," with Vanessa Ochs, The Melton Journal, 19 (Summer, 1985). Reprinted in Religion and Intellectual Life III.2 (Winter 1986): 83–94.
- "On the Search for Academic Community," Perspectives XV.2 (Spring 1985):9–19.
- "Torah, Language and Philosophy," International Journal for Philosophy of Religion, 18(1985): 115–122.
- "Scriptural Pragmatism: Jewish Philosophy's Conception of Truth" International Philosophical Quarterly XXVI.2 (June 1986):131–135.
- "There's Much More Here Than Ontology: A Reply to Huston Smith," Religion and Intellectual Life, III No.3 (Spring 1986): 43–52.
- "There's No God-Talk Unless God Talks: A Study of Max Kadushin as Rabbinic Pragmatist," Proceedings of the Academy for Jewish Philosophy, 1986.
- "On The Relevance of Charles Peirce," Annals of Scholarship (Fall 1987):49–63
- "Returning to the Father?(A Comment on Paul van Buren's Theology of the Jewish/Christian Reality)", Religion and Intellectual Life (Fall 1987):116–122.
- "Charles Peirce's Unpragmatic Christianity: A Rabbinic Appraisal," American Journal of Theology and Philosophy 9 Nos. 1 & 2 (Jan-May 1988):41–73.
- "A Pragmatic Method of Reading Confused Philosophic Texts: The Case of Peirce's 'Illustrations,'" Transactions of the C.S. Peirce Society, XXV.3 (Summer 1989): 251–291.
- "Rabbinic Text Process Theology," Journal of Jewish Thought and Philosophy I.1 (Fall 1991):141–177.
- "Theosemiotics and Pragmatism," Journal of Religion 72 No.1 (Jan. 1992):59–81.
- "The Postmodern Jewish Philosophy Bitnetwork, "Religious Studies Newsletter (Fall 1992).
- "Rabbinic Semiotics," The American Journal of Semiotics 10 Nos. 1–2 (1993): 35–66.
- "Pragmatic Conditions for Jewish-Christian Theological Dialogue," Modern Theology 9#2 (April 1993): 123–140.
- "The Sentiment of Pragmatism: From the Pragmatic Maxim to a Pragmatic Faith," The Monist, issue on "Pragmatism: a Second Look," 75 #5 (1992): 551–568.
- "Borowitz and the Postmodern Renewal of Theology," CrossCurrents 43 #2 (Summer, 1993): 164–183.
- "Gold and Silver: Philosophical Talmud (on B. Talmud perek hazahav )," with Robert Gibbs, in Postmodern Jewish Philosophy Network Vol 2: Special AAR Newsletter (November 1993): 2–18.
- "Continuity as Vagueness: The Mathematical Antecedents of Peirce's Semiotics," Semiotica, 96-3/4 (1993): 231–255.
- "The Hermeneutic Tradition, From Ast to Ricoeur", in Semiotica 104-3/4 (1995), 371–386.
- "Scriptural Logic: Diagrams for a Postcritical Metaphysics," Modern Theology 11:1(Jan. 1995): 65–92, reprinted in Rethinking Metaphysics, Gregory Jones and Stephen E. Fowl, eds., (Oxford and Cambridge: Blackwell, 1995): 65–92.
- "Returning to Scripture: Trends in Postcritical Scriptural Interpretation," CrossCurrents 44:4 (Winter, 1994–95): 437–452.
- "Epilogue to Michael Wyschogrod's Letter to a Jewish Christian Friend," Modern Theology 10(1994).
- "How to Read a Text: Approaches in Postmodern Jewish Philosophy," essay and edited collection for SHMA 25/488 (February, 1995): 1–8.
- "Difference with Respect (To)," Semiotics 1995: Proceedings of the Semiotic Society of America, Spring, 1996.
- "Teaching Judaism in a Secular Setting," A Roundtable with Larry Schiffman, Yaakov Elman, and Susan Handelman, Wellsprings (Spring, 1996).
- “Zionism” (Introduction) in Textual Reasoning: The Journal of the Postmodern Jewish Philosophy Network, Vol 6.3, Winter, 1997.
- “On the Unity of God,’ The Living Pulpit (Spring 1999):10–11.
- “Genesis 1–2: Creation as Evolution,” The Living Pulpit 9 no 2 (April/June, 2000): 8–10.
- “From Phenomenology to Scripture,” essay and edited collection, Modern Theology 16 No 3 (July, 2000): 341–346 (collection, 301–346).
- “Church and Sociality,” The Living Pulpit 9 #4 (Oct/Dec 2000): 4–5.
- “Holiness,” The Living Pulpit 10 no. 2 (July/Aug, 2001).
- “Preface to David Halivni’s Prayer in the Shoah,” in Judaism 199 Vol. 50 No. 3 (Summer, 2001), pp. 259–267.
- “The Rules of Scriptural Reasoning,” in The Journal of Scriptural Reasoning 2 No. 1 (May, 2002)(Pub. of the Electronic Text Center, University of Virginia ): 1–20.
- “Is the Scriptural Reasoner’s Heart Hardened or Warm” in The Journal of Scriptural Reasoning 2 No. 2 (Sept. 2002) (Pub. of the Electronic Text Center, University of Virginia ): 2pp.
- “Behind the Mechitsa: Reflections on The Rules of Textual Reasoning,” in Journal of Textual Reasoning (New Series) Vol. 1.1 ( University of Virginia Electronic Book Center : Spring, 2002): pp. 2–47.
- “Introduction,” Theologie et Philosophie de Langue Francaise, Volume 1.1 (Spring 2002) (Pub. of the Electronic Text Center, University of Virginia).
- “Three Visitors and Scriptural Hermeneutics,” in The Journal of Scriptural Reasoning 2 No. 3 (September, 2002) (Pub. of the Electronic Text Center, University of Virginia ):2pp.
- “Trinity and Judaism,” in Concilium 2003/4 II.3, “Experiences and Results of Interreligious Dialogue: The Abrahamic Traditions.” Trans of: “Dreifaltigkeit und Judentum,” in Concilium 39.4 (Oct 2003): Von anderen Religionen Lernen, pp. 433–441.
- “Le shituf et le Dieu trinitaire du Christianisme,” in Le Christianisme au miroir du judaïsme, ed. Shmuel Trigano ( Paris : In Press Éditions, 2003), 133–150.
- “On Hauerwas’ “With the Grain of the Universe”, Modern Theology 19, No. 1 (January, 2003): 77–88.
- “Jewish Morning Worship: New Life Through Redemptive Prayer,” The Living Pulpit 12 #3 (July–September, 2003): 20–21.
- “A Jewish Reading of Trinity, Time and the Church: A Response to the Theology of Robert W. Jenson,” A Review Essay, in Modern Theology 19. No. 3 (July 2003): 419–428.
- “The Passion and Repentance,” The Living Pulpit 13 #3 (July-Sept, 2004): 6–8.
- “Dreifaltigkeit und Judentum,” in Concilium 39.4 (Oct 2003): Von anderen Religionen Lernen, pp. 433–441.
- “Response to Ellen Armour,” “Comparative Religious Traditions,” and “Reply to Robert Segal,” Journal of the American Academy of Religion 74 #1 (March 2006): pp. 16–18, 125–128, 133–34.
- “Jewish Sensibilities,” Issue edited and with an introduction by P. Ochs, The Journal of Textual Reasoning 4:3 (May 2006)
- “Revised: Comparative Religious Traditions,” and “Reply to Robert Segal,” Journal of the American Academy of Religion 74 #2 (June 2006): pp. 483–494, 499–500.
- “Philosophic Warrants for Scriptural Reasoning,” in Modern Theology Vol. 22 No. 3 (July 2006). Special Issue, "The Promise of Scriptural Reasoning." Guest Editors: C. C. Pecknold and David F. Ford: pp. 465–483.
- “Coda,” in “Spreading Rumours of Wisdom: Essays in honour of David Ford,” The Journal of Scriptural Reasoning Vol. 7 No. 1(January 2008): 10 pp.
- “Response: Reflections on Binarism,” in Special issue, “Symposium: Pragmatism and Biblical Hermeneutics: The Work of Peter Ochs,” Modern Theology Vol. 24 No. 3 (July 2008): pp. 487–498.
- “Reparative Reasoning: From Peirce’s Pragmatism to Augustine’s Scriptural Semiotic,” in Modern Theology Vol. 25 No. 2 (April 2009): 187–215
- “Scriptural Pragmatism: A Response to the ‘Roots and Hopes of Scriptural Reasoning,’” in The Journal of Scriptural Reasoning Vol 9 No. 1 (September, 2010): 70pp.
- “Grassroots Scriptural Reasoning on Campus,” with Homayra Ziad, Journal of Inter-Religious Dialogue 4 (Summer 2010): 38–45.
- “How my mind has changed: Another Enlightenment,” in The Christian Century, January 17, 2011:http://www.christiancentury.org/article/2011-01/another-enlightenment.
- “Shalom Chaver: From Strangers to Study Partners,” in “Who is My Enemy?”Annual Proceedings of the Theology Institute of Villanova University: 2011.

=== Chapters ===
- "Individuality," and "Truth," in Contemporary Jewish Religious Thought, A. Cohen and P. Mendes-Flohr, eds. (Scribner's, New York:1987), pp. 483–85, and 1017–23.
- "A Rabbinic Pragmatism," in Theology and Dialogue, ed. Bruce Marshall (Notre Dame: University of Notre Dame, 1990).
- "Charles Peirce as Postmodern Philosopher," in David Ray Griffin et al. Founders of Constructive Postmodern Philosophy: Peirce, James, Bergson, Whitehead and Hartshorne (Albany: SUNY Press, 1992): 43–87.
- "Postcritical Scriptural Interpretation," in Torah and Revelation, ed. Dan Cohn-Sherbok ( New York, Toronto: Edwin Mellen Press, 1992): 51–73.
- " A Jewish View of Blessing," in Of Human Bondage and Divine Grace: A Global Testimony, ed. John Ross Carter (La Salle, ILL: Open Court, 1992):171–186.
- "Compassionate Postmodernism: An Introduction to Rabbinic Semiotics," Soundings LXXVI#1 (Sp 1993): 140–152; in a collection of essays edited by P. Ochs on "Trends in Postmodern Jewish Philosophy."
- "Postcritical Scriptural Interpretation in Judaism," in Interpreting Judaism in a Postmodern Age, ed. Steven Kepnes (New York: New York University Press, 1996): 55–84.
- "Rabbinic Text Process Theology," in Jewish Theology and Process Thought, ed. S. Lubarsky and D. Griffin (Albany: SUNY Press, 1996):195–231.
- "Judaism and Christian Theology," in The Modern Theologians Second Ed., David F. Ford, ed. (Oxford and Cambridge: Blackwell, 1997): 607–625.
- “Exodus 3: An Introduction to Textual Reasoning,” in Stephen Fowl, ed., The Theological Interpretation of Scripture (Oxford and Cambridge, Blackwell: 1997): pp. 129–142.
- "Theosemiotics and Religion," in Arthur Stewart, Religious Dimensions of Peirce's Thought (Beaumont, Texas: Center For Philosophical Studies: 1998).
- "B’nei Ezra; An Introduction to Textual Reasoning," in Contemporary Jewish Thought, eds. E. Dorf and L. Newman (Oxford: Oxford University Press, 1999): 502–511.
- “Wounded Word, Wounded Interpreter,” in Humanity at the Limits, ed. M. Signer (Indiana University Press, 2000): 148–160.
- “Ethical Monotheism When the Word Is Wounded: Wendell Dietrich Reread,” in Ethical Monotheism, Past and Present: Essays in honor of Wendell Dietrich, eds. Theodore Vial and Mark Hadley ( Atlanta : Scholars Press for Brown Judaica Series, 2001): 15–48.
- “On the Future of Discourse in Jewish-Christian Relations,” with David Ford, in Setting the Agenda: the Future of Jewish-Christian Relations (Cambridge University Press, forthcoming, 2001).
- “Small Actions Against Terror: Jewish Reflections on a Christian Witness,” in Against Terror: A Witness to Love and Justice, ed. Victoria Erickson (Ada, MI : Brazos Press, 2001).
- Preface to Heather Armstrong, Face to Face with the Other in George Eliot's Romola, Middlemarch, and Daniel Deronda (Scholar's Press, 2002): i-iv.
- “September 11 and the Children of Abraham,” in “Dissent from the Homeland: Essays after September 11, The South Atlantic Quarterly 101:2 (sp 2002): 391–402. repr. in Dissent from the Homeland: Essays after September 11 (Durham and London: Duke University Press, 2003): 137–147.
- “Recovering the God of History: Scriptural Life after Death in Judaism and Christianity,” in Jews and Christians, People of God, eds. Carl E. Braaten and Robert W. Jenson (Grand Rapids and Cambridge: Eerdmans, 2003): 114–147.
- “A Framework for American Jewish Theological Dialogue?” A Review of Eugene Borowitz, Studies in the Meaning of Judaism and of Eliezer Berkovits, Essential Essays on Judaism, ed. David Hazony in Sh'ma: A Journal of Jewish Responsibility (2003).
- “Abrahamic Theo-politics: A Jewish View,” in eds. William Cavanaugh and Peter Scott, The Blackwell Companion to Political Theology (Blackwells, 2003).
- “Covenant,” in Modern Judaism: An Oxford Guide, eds. Nicholas de Lange and Miri Frued-Kandel ( Oxford : Oxford University Press, 2004): 290–300.
- “Scripture,” in Fields of Faith: Theological and Religious Studies for the Twenty-First Century, eds. David Ford, Janet Soskice, Ben Quash ( Cambridge : Cambridge University Press, 2004): 104–118.
- “A Road to the Postmodern Palace: Michael Rosenak’s Theological Response to the Postmodern Condition,” in ed. Jonathan Cohen, In Search of a Jewish Paideia: Directions in the Philosophy of Jewish Education. Melton Studies in Jewish Education Vol X ( Hebrew University, Magnes Press, 2004: 17–31.
- “Israel’s Redeemer is the One to Whom and with Whom She Prays,” in eds. S. David, D. Kendall, and G. Collins, The Redemption: An Interdisciplinary Symposium on Christ as Redeemer (Oxford University Press, 2004): 121–146.
- “Israels Erlöser ist der Eine und Einzige, zu dem und mit dem Israel betend spricht,” trans. Annegrete Sauter, Evangelische Theologie 64 Jg. (2004) Heft 6: S. 405–420.
- “Textual Reasoning as a Model for Jewish Thought After Shoah,” in eds. P. Amodio, G. Giannini, and G. Lissa, Filosofia E Critica Della Filisofia Nel Pensiero Ebraico (Napoli: Giannini Editore, 2004): 233–272.
- “Judaism and Christian Theology,” The Modern Theologians 3rd Edition, eds. David Ford and Rachel Muers (Oxford: Blackwell Publishers, 2005): 645–662.
- “Zeichen” and “Tora,” in Religion in Geschichte und Gegenwart: Handwörterbuch für Theologie und Religionswissenschaft, eds. Betz, Browning, Janowski und Jüngel (Tübingen: Mohr Siebeck, 2006).
- “God” and “Trinity,” in A Dictionary of Jewish-Christian Relations, eds. Edward Kessler and Neil Wenborn, (Cambridge: Cambridge University Press, 2005): 167–170, 429–430.
- “Abrahamic Hauerwas: Theological Conditions for Justifying Inter-Abrahamic Study” in God, Truth, And Witness: Engaging Stanley Hauerwas, eds. Greg Jones, Reinhold Hutter, C. Rosalee Velloso Ewell (Brazos Press, 2005): 309–327.
- “The Logic of Indignity and the Logic of Redemption,” in God and Human Dignity, co-edited with Linda Woodhead (Grand Rapids: Eerdmans, 2006): 143–160.
- “Philosophic Warrants for Scriptural Reasoning,” in The Promise Of Scriptural Reasoning, eds. David Ford and C.C. Pecknold (Oxford: Blackwell Pub., 2006): 121–238. Also appearing in Modern Theology Vol. 22 No. 3 (July 2006): Special Issue, "The Promise of Scriptural Reasoning" Guest Editors: David F. Ford and C. C. Pecknold: pp. 465–483.
- “A Third Epoch: The Future of Discourse in Jewish-Christian Relations,” with David Ford, in Challenges in Jewish-Christian Relations, eds. James Aitken and Edward Kessler (Mahwah: Paulist Press, 2006): 153–170.
- “Morning Prayer as Redemptive Thinking,” in Liturgy, Time, and the Politics of Redemption, eds. Randi Rashkover and C.C. Pecknold (Eerdmans Pub, 2006): 50–90.
- “From Two to Three: To Know is also To Know the Context of Knowing,” in Steven Kepnes and Basit Bilal Koshul, eds., Studying the "Other", Understanding the "Self": Scripture, Reason and the Contemporary Islam-West Encounter: (New York: Fordham University Press, 2007).
- “The Bible’s Wounded Authority,” in ed. William Brown, Engaging Biblical Authority (Westminster John Knox Press, 2007): 113–121.
- “Reading Across a Difference,” in ed. Jessica Feldman, Thinking of Reading: A University of Virginia Guide (Charlottesville: University of Virginia Press, 2008).
- “Saints and the Heterological Historians,” in Saintly Influence: Texts for Edith Wyschogrod, ed. Martin Kavka, Stephen Hood and Eric Boynton (Fordham University Press, 2009): 219–237.
- “Michael Signer’s Philosophical Theology of Plain Sense,” in Transforming Relations: Essays on Jews and Christians throughout History In Honor of Michael S. Signer edited by Franklin T. Harkins (Notre Dame: University of Notre Dame Press, 2009).
- “Moses at the Sea: Scripture as Performance,” and “Introduction: Crisis, Leadership, and Scriptural Reasoning,” in Crisis, Call and Leadership in the Abrahamic Traditions, eds. Peter Ochs and Stacy Johnson (Palgrave Macmillan, 2009): 1–9, 290–305.
- “Scripture in Modern Jewish Philosophy,” in The Cambridge History of Jewish Philosophy: The Modern Era, ed. Martin Kavka and David Novak (Cambridge: expected 2011).
