= Bibliography of Tom Greggs =

Publications of theologian Tom Greggs include:

== Non-academic publications ==
- Greggs, Tom. "Trinity and Community." Ascend: Church of Scotland Magazine for Ministers, Autumn 2018.
- Greggs, Tom. "A Giant of Theology." In "Supplement on Calvin." The Methodist Recorder, January 2009.
- Greggs, Tom. "Tolerance Isn't Enough!" Emerging Culture, Spring 2007: 12–13.
- Greggs, Tom. "The Future of God." Emerging Culture, Summer 2006: 25.
- Greggs, Tom. "Irenaeus and Augustine on the Problem of Evil Reconsidered." New Theologian, Spring 2004: 22–24.

== Research and publications ==
=== Books ===
- Greggs, Tom; Goodmann, Daniel; El Masri, Ghassan. Key Concepts in Interreligious Discourses: Redemption in Judaism, Christianity & Islam. De Gruyter, 2023.
- Greggs, Tom. The Church in a World of Religions: Working Papers in Theology. T&T Clark, 2022.
- Greggs, Tom. Barth and Bonhoeffer as Contributors to a Post Liberal Ecclesiology: Essays of Hope for a Fallen and Complex World. T&T Clark, 2022.
- Greggs, Tom. The Breadth of Salvation: Rediscovering the Fullness of God's Saving Work. Baker Academic, 2020.
- Greggs, Tom. A Dogmatic Ecclesiology. Vol. 1: The Priestly Catholicity of the Church. Baker Academic, 2019.
- Greggs, Tom; Louth, Andrew; Levering, Matthew; Horton, Michael; Sanders, Fred. Five Views on the Extent of the Atonement. Zondervan Academic, 2019.
- Greggs, Tom; Muers, Rachel; Zahl, Simeon, eds. The Vocation of Theology Today: A Festschrift for David Ford. Cascade, 2013.
- Greggs, Tom. Theology Against Religion: Constructive Dialogues with Bonhoeffer and Barth. T&T Clark, 2011.
- Greggs, Tom, ed. New Perspectives for Evangelical Theology: Engaging God, Scripture and the World. Routledge, 2010.
- Greggs, Tom. Barth, Origen, and Universal Salvation: Restoring Particularity. Oxford University Press, 2009.
- Greggs, Tom. Dietrich Bonhoeffer: A Real Theologian. CTT, 2003.

=== Book chapters ===
- Greggs, Tom. "Vitality as a Nota Ecclesiae?" In »Wir können's ja nicht lassen…«: Vitalität als Kennzeichen einer Kirche der Sendung, edited by Felix Eiffler and David Reissmann. Evangelische Verlagsanstalt, 2023 (in press).
- Greggs, Tom. "The Church." In The Cambridge Companion to Christian Doctrine (rev. ed.), edited by Michael Allen. Cambridge University Press, forthcoming.
- Greggs, Tom. "Evangelical Theology." In T&T Clark Handbook of Modern Theology, edited by Philip Ziegler and R. David Nelson. T&T Clark, forthcoming.
- Greggs, Tom. "Gratitude in Creation and in Grace: One Protestant Approach to the Question of Whether Gratitude is a Burden or a Hope." In Gratitude: Christian and Muslim Perspectives, edited by Mona Siddiqui and Nathanael Vette. Cambridge University Press, forthcoming.
- Greggs, Tom. "Ecclesiology." In T&T Clark Encyclopedia of Christian Theology, edited by Paul Molnar and Iain Torrance. T&T Clark, forthcoming.
- Greggs, Tom. "Wesley's Radical Ecclesiology: A Church for the World not a World for the Church; or Polity only for a Purpose." In The Reinventions of Methodism: Sect, Church and Radical Movement, edited by Kenneth Newport et al. Oxford University Press, forthcoming.
- Greggs, Tom. "Creation and Covenant." In The Oxford Handbook to Creation, edited by Simon Oliver. Oxford University Press, forthcoming.
- Greggs, Tom. "Scripture in the Life of the Church: Sola Scriptura and Ecclesial Interpretation." In Scripture, Canon and Interpretation, edited by Donald Wood. IVP, forthcoming.
- Greggs, Tom. "Post-Barthian Universalism." In Christian Universalism: A Multi-view Account, edited by David Congdon. Baker Academic, forthcoming.
- Greggs, Tom. "For God and for the World: A Generously Orthodox Church." In The Bond of Peace: Exploring Generous Orthodoxy, edited by Graham Tomlin and Nathan Eddy, 89–105. SPCK, 2021.
- Greggs, Tom. "Never a Liberal to Be 'Post' It: (Re-)Learning to Be a Better Kind of Evangelical with Peter Ochs." In Signs of Salvation: A Festschrift for Peter Ochs, edited by Tom Greggs, Mark James and Randi Rashkover, 135–145. Wipf and Stock, 2021.
- Greggs, Tom. "The Glory of God in the People of God: Participating in the Intensity of the Spirit's Life." In Exploring the Glory of God: New Horizons for a Theology of Glory, edited by Adesola Akala, 37–54. Lexington, 2021.
- Greggs, Tom. "Joining Christ in Prayer: The Threefold Office of Christ." In T&T Clark Handbook to Christian Prayer, edited by Ashley Cocksworth and John McDowell, 177–190. T&T Clark, 2021.
- Greggs, Tom. "Karl Barth and the Patristic Era." In Oxford Handbook to Karl Barth, edited by Paul Jones and Paul Nimmo, 71–85. Oxford University Press, 2020.
- Greggs, Tom. "Ecclesiology." In Oxford Handbook to Dietrich Bonhoeffer, edited by Philip Ziegler and Michael Mawson, 225–240. Oxford University Press, 2020.
- Greggs, Tom. "Karl Barth on Salvation." In Christian Theologies of Salvation, edited by Justin Holcomb, 300–317. New York University Press, 2017.
- Greggs, Tom. "Universalism." In T&T Clark Companion to the Atonement, edited by Adam Johnson, 787–790. T&T Clark, 2017.
- Greggs, Tom. "The Order and Movement of Eternity: Karl Barth on the Eternity of God and Creaturely Time." In Eternal God, Eternal Life: Theological Investigations into the Concept of Immortality, edited by Philip Ziegler, 1–26. Bloomsbury, 2016.
- Greggs, Tom. "Sola Scriptura, the Community of the Church and a Pluralist Age." In Theologians on Scripture, edited by Angus Pattison, 79–92. Bloomsbury, 2016.
- Greggs, Tom. "The Influence of Dietrich Bonhoeffer on Karl Barth." In Engaging Bonhoeffer: The Influence and Impact of Bonhoeffer's Life and Thought, edited by Matthew Kirkpatrick, 45–64. Fortress, 2016.
- Greggs, Tom. "Communio Ecclesiology: The Spirit's Work of Salvation in the Life of the Church." In Third Article Theology: A Pneumatological Dogmatics, edited by Myk Habets, 347–366. Fortress Press, 2016.
- Greggs, Tom. "Bearing Sin in the Church: The Ecclesial Hamartiology of Dietrich Bonhoeffer." In The Challenges of Bonhoeffer's Theology and Ethics, edited by Michael Mawson and Philip Ziegler, 77–100. T&T Clark, 2016.
- Greggs, Tom. "Proportion and Topography in Ecclesiology: A Working Paper on the Dogmatic Location of the Doctrine of the Church." In Theological Theology: Essays in Honour of John Webster, edited by R. David Nelson, Darren Sarisky and Justin Stratis, 89–106. T&T Clark, 2015.
- Greggs, Tom. "The Church and Sacraments." In Sanctified by Grace: A Theology of the Christian Life, edited by Kent Eilers and Kyle Strobel, 157–170. T&T Clark, 2014.
- Greggs, Tom. "Relational Responsibility in Biblical Hermeneutics: Towards a Protestant Account of the Authority of Creeds for Scriptural Interpretation." In The Future of Biblical Interpretation: Responsible Plurality in Biblical Hermeneutics, edited by Stanley E. Porter and Matthew Malcolm, 93–105. Paternoster, 2013.
- Greggs, Tom. "A Strangely Warmed Heart in a Strange and Complex World: On Assurance and Generous Hope." In Generous Ecclesiology: Church, World and the Kingdom of God, edited by Julie Gittoes, Brutus Green and James Heard, 120–139. SCM, 2013.
- Greggs, Tom; Muers, Rachel; Zahl, Simeon. "Introduction." In The Vocation of Theology Today, 1–18. Cascade, 2013.
- Greggs, Tom. "Being a Wise Apprentice to the Communion of Modern Saints: On the Need for Conversation with a Plurality of Theological Interlocutors." In The Vocation of Theology Today: A Festschrift for David Ford, 21–24. Cascade, 2013.
- Greggs, Tom. "Reading Scripture in a Pluralist Society: A Path to Discovering the Hermeneutics of Agape." In Horizons in Hermeneutics: A Festschrift in Honor of Anthony C. Thiselton, edited by Stanley E. Porter and Matthew Malcolm, 201–216. Eerdmans, 2013.
- Greggs, Tom. "Motifs in Pneumatology in the Twenty-First Century." In The Holy Spirit and the World Today, edited by Jane Williams, 175–188. SPTC Books, 2011.
- Greggs, Tom. "The Lord of All: Rediscovering the Christian Doctrine of Providence for a Pluralist Society." In Theology, Religion and Exclusion: Towards Transformation, edited by Hannah Bacon and Wayne Morris, 44–62. T&T Clark, 2011.
- Greggs, Tom. "Particularist Universalism in Origen of Alexandria." In 'All Shall Be Well': Explorations in Universal Salvation and Christian Theology from Origen to Moltmann, edited by Gregory MacDonald, 29–46. Cascade, 2010.
- Greggs, Tom. "Introduction—Opening Evangelicalism: Towards a Post-critical and Formative Theology." In New Perspectives for Evangelical Theology, edited by Tom Greggs, 1–13. Routledge, 2010.
- Greggs, Tom. "Beyond the Binary: Forming Evangelical Eschatology." In New Perspectives for Evangelical Theology, edited by Tom Greggs, 153–167. Routledge, 2010.
- Greggs, Tom. "Religionless Christianity in a Complexly Religious and Secular World: Thinking Through and Beyond Bonhoeffer." In Religion, Religionlessness and Contemporary Western Culture. International Bonhoeffer Interpretations, Vol. 1, edited by Ralf K. Wüstenberg and Stephen J. Plant, 111–125. Peter Lang, 2008.

=== Journal articles ===
- Greggs, Tom. "Illuminating Grace: The Spirit's Work in Aiding Reception and the Hearing of the Word." International Journal of Systematic Theology (forthcoming).
- Greggs, Tom. "Response to Reviews of Dogmatic Ecclesiology." International Journal of Systematic Theology 24, no. 3 (2022): 315–323.
- Greggs, Tom. "The Promise and Challenge of Ecumenism in the Twenty-First Century: What Do We Really Mean by Visible Unity?" Lutheran Forum 55, no. 1 (2021): 29–35.
- Greggs, Tom. "Identity in Christ." Royal Army Chaplains' Department Journal 59 (2021): 13–19.
- Greggs, Tom. "The Call to Focus on God: A Review Article on John Webster's God without Measure." Modern Theology 34, no. 4 (2018): 657–663.
- Greggs, Tom. "The Nature, Task and Method of Theology: A Very Methodist View." International Journal of Systematic Theology 20, no. 3 (2018): 309–334.
- Greggs, Tom. "Glorifying in God's Glory: A Contemporary Account of Divine Glorification from a Methodist Theologian." Revista Theologica 99, no. 2 (2017): 29–46.
- Greggs, Tom. "The Catholic Spirit of Protestantism: A Very Methodist Take on the Third Article, Visible Unity and Ecumenism." Pro Ecclesia 26, no. 4 (2017): 353–372.
- Greggs, Tom. "In Gratitude for Grace: Praise, Worship and the Sanctified Life." Scottish Journal of Theology 70, no. 2 (2017): 147–165.
- Greggs, Tom. "The Priesthood of No Believer: On the Priesthood of Christ and His Church." International Journal of Systematic Theology 17, no. 4 (2015): 374–398.
- Greggs, Tom. "'If It Is Teaching, Then Teach!' (Rom 12:7): Ministry, Big Issues, and Grown Up Discipleship." Holiness 1, no. 1 (2015): 3–20.
- Greggs, Tom. "Ecclesial Priestly Mediation in the Theology of Bonhoeffer." Theology Today 71, no. 1 (2014): 81–91.
- Greggs, Tom. "Dialoguing with the Wisdom of the Past: An Interview with Professor Tom Greggs." The Christian Thought (2014): 144–153.
- Greggs, Tom. "Peoples of the Covenants: Evangelical Theology and the Plurality of the Covenants in Scripture." Journal for Scriptural Reasoning 11, no. 1 (2012).
- Greggs, Tom. "Review Article of David Kelsey, Eccentric Existence." Scottish Journal of Theology 65, no. 4 (2012): 449–463.
- Greggs, Tom. "The Confessions of Stanley: Accounting for a Human Life Lived Before God." Modern Theology 28, no. 2 (2012): 315–319.
- Greggs, Tom. "Speaking and Thinking about God." The Review 62, no. 2 (nos. 220–221) (2011): 349–356.
- Greggs, Tom. "Pessimistic Universalism: Rethinking the Wider Hope with Bonhoeffer and Barth." Modern Theology 26, no. 4 (2010): 495–510.
- Greggs, Tom. "Inter-faith Pedagogy for Muslims and Christians: Scriptural Reasoning and Christian and Muslim Youth Work." Discourse 9, no. 2 (2010): 201–226.
- Greggs, Tom. "The Eschatological Tension of Theological Method: Some Reflections After Reading Daniel W. Hardy's 'Creation and Eschatology.'" Theology 113, no. 875 (2010): 339–347.
- Greggs, Tom. "Legitimizing and Necessitating Inter-faith Dialogue: The Dynamics of Inter-faith for Individual Faith Communities." International Journal of Public Theology 4, no. 2 (2010): 194–211.
- Greggs, Tom. "Editorial." International Journal of Systematic Theology 12, no. 1 (2010): 1–3.
- Greggs, Tom. "Preaching Inter-faith: Finding Hints About the Religious Other from the Good Samaritan." Epworth Review 36, no. 3 (2009): 60–70.
- Greggs, Tom. "Religionless Christianity and the Political Implications of Theological Speech: What Bonhoeffer's Theology Yields to a World of Fundamentalisms." International Journal of Systematic Theology 11, no. 3 (2009): 293–308.
- Greggs, Tom. "The Many Names of Christ in Wisdom: Reading Scripture with Origen for a Diverse World." The Journal for Scriptural Reasoning 7, no. 1 (2008).
- Greggs, Tom. "Bringing Barth on Religion to the Inter-faith Table." The Journal of Religion 88, no. 1 (2008): 75–94.
- Greggs, Tom. "Exclusivist or Universalist? Origen 'the Wise Steward of the Word' (CommRom. V.1.7) and the Issue of Genre." International Journal of Systematic Theology 9, no. 3 (2007): 315–327.
- Greggs, Tom. "'Jesus is Victor': Passing the Impasse of Barth on Universalism." Scottish Journal of Theology 60, no. 2 (2007): 196–212.
- Greggs, Tom. "Why Does the Church Need Academic Theology?" Epworth Review 33, no. 3 (2006): 27–37.
