= Vanessa L. Ochs =

American scholar of religion

Vanessa L. Ochs (born November 2, 1953) is an American scholar of religion at the University of Virginia, an ordained rabbi and an important figure in the fields of Jewish feminism and Jewish ritual. She is a member of the Jewish Studies Program at the university, where she teaches courses in Judaism, the anthropology of religion, and spiritual writing.

Ochs' writing was recognized by a Creative Writing Fellowship through the National Endowment for the Arts and she is the winner of a National Jewish Book Award in the category Contemporary Jewish Life and Practice for Inventing Jewish Rituals.

== Career and thought ==
Vanessa L. Ochs was born in Rochester, New York, November 2, 1953. She received her B.A. in Drama and French from Tufts University (1974), M.F.A. in Theater from Sarah Lawrence College (1977), and Ph.D. in Anthropology of Religion from Drew University (2000). In 2012, she was ordained as a rabbi.

While working as a professional writer, Ochs began her academic career at Colgate University (1980–86) before taking various positions in writing at Yale University, Hebrew University, and Drew University (1990–97). She was a senior fellow at the National Jewish Center for Learning and Leadership (CLAL) in New York City (1995–2001). Ochs was a founding member of the Jewish Studies Program at the University of Virginia and its first Ida and Nathan Kolodiz Director (2001–2006).

Ochs's research in the study of religion has focused on Jewish feminism, material culture, and Jewish ritual. An ongoing interest in the subfield of material culture is the question of what makes a home ‘Jewish.’ Her work on ritual has explored how recent innovations in Jewish practice have both expanded to more fully incorporate the experience of women. This research, along with others, testifies to the continued importance of ritual in the lives of modern Jews, exemplified in the ways religious practices have adapted to modern conditions while referencing ancient practice, sometimes creating rituals marking specifically woman-centered events (e.g., menstruation, divorce, menopause).

Her writing has been featured in The New York Times, Huffington Post, The Washington Post, Haaretz, Tablet Magazine, The Jewish Review of Books, The Forward, Tikkun, among others, and was a regular consultant for Religion & Ethics NewsWeekly. She is a writer and contributing editor for Sh’ma Journal, a guest editor for Nashim, and has served on the editorial board of AJS Perspectives, among others.

Through her analyses of feminist ritual, Ochs has contributed to the movement in Jewish thought of transforming modern ways of knowing, or epistemologies, through a sensitivity to gendered lenses; feminist critique thereby seeks to contribute not only deeper understandings of texts and practices, but to also open a space for reconsidering the normative implications of those texts and practices on the contemporary scene.

== Major works ==
- "The Passover Haggadah: A Biography" (2020), Princeton University Press
- Inventing Jewish Rituals (2007), winner of the National Jewish Book Award for Contemporary Jewish Life & Practice, is an ethnographic work with a sustained focus on the themes of innovative ritual practice among American Jews (e.g., naming ceremonies for baby girls, Rosh Chodesh groups, women's seders, healing services). The book was an inspiration for the Reinventing Ritual exhibit at The Jewish Museum in New York City.
- Sarah Laughed: Modern Lessons from the Wisdom and Stories of Biblical Women (2004 [1st ed.], 2011 [2nd ed.]) offers gendered readings of biblical texts and new accounts of biblical women.
- Words on Fire: One Woman’s Journey into the Sacred (1990), one of the first ethnographic study of feminism in Orthodox Judaism, is an account of Ochs's stay in Jerusalem learning Torah and Talmud from women. She details the continued difficulties women face when trying to continue Jewish learning at advanced levels in the Orthodox world.

She was commissioned by Princeton University Press's “Lives of Great Religious Books” series to contribute a book on The Passover Haggadah, which she has worked on as a fellow with the Virginia Seminar in Lived Theology.

Two other books by Ochs are practically oriented: Safe and Sound: Protecting Your Child in an Unpredictable World (1995), deals with the phenomenon of parental over-protection, and The Jewish Dream Book (2003), written with her daughter Elizabeth, applies lessons from Jewish mysticism to dream interpretation.

In “Jewish Sensibilities” (2003), drawing upon the thought of Max Kadushin and Yitz Greenberg, Ochs introduces a framework of Jewish sensibilities—‘Making Distinctions’ (Havdalah), for instance—that characterizes particularly Jewish ways of thinking about what it means to be human. She argues that Jews tend to draw upon these sensibilities in their daily lives, even if they do not practice any of the ritual aspects of Judaism. The notion has been used to understand contemporary Judaism and the future of the community, as well as having been incorporated in various educational programs, both youth and adult.

== Women of the Wall ==
Ochs has been a major figure in the Women of the Wall (WoW) movement, a movement in Israel to allow women full access to the Western Wall, for almost thirty years. She was one of the directors of the International Committee for Women of the Wall before joining the Original Women of the Wall (OWOW) in protest of compromises made by WoW, agreeing to an off-site location for women's prayer. OWOW has insisted on authorities allowing women to use the tallit (the prayer shawl) and thetefillin (prayer straps) at the Western Wall itself, not an alternate site, as integral to its mission.

== Personal ==
Ochs is the daughter of artist Barbara Grandis (1932—2022 ) and pediatrician Bernard A. Yablin (1928 - 2016). She is married to Jewish philosopher and theologian Peter Ochs. They are the parents of two daughters, Juliana Ochs Dweck, chief curator at the Princeton University Art Museum, and Elizabeth Ochs, an educator and co-author of The Jewish Dream Book with Ochs.
