= David F. Ford =

Irish theologian

David F. Ford OBE
- Born: David Frank Ford; 23 January 1948 (age 78); Dublin, Ireland
- Spouse: Deborah Ford

Academic background
- Education: Trinity College, Dublin; St John's College, Cambridge; Yale University
- Thesis: Biblical Narrative and the Theological Method of Karl Barth in the "Church Dogmatics" (1977)
- Doctoral advisor: Donald M. MacKinnon; Stephen Sykes

Academic work
- Discipline: Theology
- School or tradition: Anglicanism
- Institutions: University of Birmingham; Selwyn College, Cambridge
- Main interests: Ecumenical theology; hermeneutics; interfaith relations; political theology; scriptural reasoning; theology and poetry; theology and universities

David Frank Ford OBE (born 23 January 1948) is an Anglican public theologian. He was the Regius Professor of Divinity at the University of Cambridge, beginning in 1991. He is now an Emeritus Regius Professor of Divinity. His research interests include political theology, ecumenical theology, Christian theologians and theologies, theology and poetry, the shaping of universities and of the field of theology and religious studies within universities, hermeneutics, and interfaith theology and relations. He is the founding director of the Cambridge Inter-Faith Programme and a co-founder of the Society for Scriptural Reasoning.

== Early life and education ==
For was born on 23 January 1948 in Dublin. He was raised as an Anglican in the Church of Ireland in Dublin. His father died when he was 12 years old and he was raised by his mother, Phyllis Mary Elizabeth Ford.

For his undergraduate education, he studied at Trinity College Dublin, where he was active in politics, debate and journalism. He was elected a Scholar in classics in 1968. After completing his degree, he interviewed for jobs at British Steel Corporation and Rolls-Royce, but then was offered a scholarship to St John's College, Cambridge and decided to study theology for a few years before going into business. He earned his bachelor's degree in theology at Cambridge and went on to earn his Master of Sacred Theology degree at Yale Divinity School; he also did graduate work at the University of Tübingen. He gained his doctorate at Cambridge, writing his dissertation on Karl Barth and biblical narrative under the direction of Donald MacKinnon and Stephen Sykes. The result was the book Barth and God's Story (1981). Ford later received an honorary Doctor of Divinity degree from the University of Birmingham.

== Career ==
From 1976 to 1991 Ford was a lecturer (later senior lecturer) at the University of Birmingham. Living in the inner city, his theology was shaped by a multi-faith experience, and he also became involved in a local Anglican church in the evangelical tradition. As his housemate was involved in renovating derelict houses, he lived in some of those houses and became a house manager for one of them. In the university's theology department, he became close to theologian Daniel W. Hardy and went on to marry Hardy's daughter.

In 1991 he moved to Cambridge to become the Regius Professor of Divinity at the University of Cambridge. He is the first professor in this post who is not in the Anglican ministry. He helped found and chairs the management committee of the Centre for Advanced Religious and Theological Studies at Cambridge. He is a member of St John's College, a fellow of Selwyn College, and a foundation member of Trinity College.

He is highly regarded for his scholarship, is a sought-after lecturer and preacher, and serves as an advisor to the bishops of the Anglican Communion. His books have met with wide appeal; his The Modern Theologians: An Introduction to Christian Theology in the Twentieth Century (Blackwell, 1997), now in its third printing, is the leading textbook on modern Christian theology in the English-speaking world, China and Korea. His Theology: A Very Short Introduction (Oxford University Press, 1999), part of the Very Short Introductions series, has been translated into many languages, including Chinese, Korean, Indonesian, Romanian, and Kurdish.

=== Multi-faith and interfaith work ===
When Ford came to Cambridge in 1991, the theology department focused almost exclusively on Christianity. Ford assisted in the realisation of a development plan which included a new building, a new Centre for Advanced Religious and Theological Studies, new endowed research posts, and the development of the Cambridge Theological Federation (the university's consortium of Anglican, Methodist, and United Reformed seminaries). The university went on to add two new posts in Islamic studies, a new post in New Testament, and a new endowed post in theology and natural science. A Roman Catholic institute and institute for Orthodox Christian theology were added to the consortium of seminaries. The Centre for Jewish–Christian Relations was established in 1998, followed by the Centre for the Study of Muslim–Jewish Relations in 2006.

Ford was introduced to interfaith dialogue in the early 1990s while on sabbatical at the Center for Theological Inquiry in Princeton, where his father-in-law, Hardy, director of the centre, introduced him to Jewish theologian Peter Ochs. Hardy and Ford participated in meetings of the early "textual reasoning" group founded by Ochs at the American Academy of Religion, reading the Tanakh, Bible, and Quran together with Christian and Muslim scholars. In 1996 Ford, Hardy and Ochs founded the Society for Scriptural Reasoning; Ford has been an active promoter of scriptural reasoning in subsequent papers and lectures.

In 2002 Ford became the founding director of the Cambridge Inter-Faith Programme. Among his activities are lectures at international conferences on Muslim–Christian relations. In October 2007 he helped launch a letter by 138 Muslim scholars to 25 Christian leaders, including the Pope, the Orthodox patriarchs, the Archbishop of Canterbury, and the heads of the world alliances of the Lutheran, Methodist, Baptist and Reformed churches, calling for peace and reconciliation between Christians and Muslims for the survival of the world. The following month, he was one of the signatories on a Christian response seeking Muslim forgiveness.

In 2008 the Sternberg Foundation awarded Ford its gold medal for Inter-Faith Relations.

In November 2012 he was awarded the Coventry International Prize for Peace and Reconciliation.

== Memberships ==
Ford is active both within the university and in public life. He has been a trustee for the Center of Theological Inquiry at Princeton since 2007 and a member of the board of advisors for the John Templeton Foundation since 2008. Other professional memberships include the American Academy of Religion and the Society of Biblical Literature.

He is an editorial board member of Modern Theology, the Scottish Journal of Theology, Teaching Theology and Religion, the Irish Theological Quarterly, and the Journal of Anglican Studies. He is an editorial advisory board member for the Current Issues in Theology series published by Cambridge University Press.

From 2003 to 2008 Ford was an academic member of the World Economic Forum Council of 100 Leaders for West-Islamic World Dialogue. He is an external advisor for the Centre for Christian Studies in Hong Kong (since 2006), a trustee for the Golden Web Foundation, a developer of a global multimedia publishing system with a focus on pre-modern world history, heritage and culture (since 2006), and a consultant for L'Arche Communities, a federation of over 100 communities for people with severe mental disabilities (since 1993).

In 2011 he was one of 1,750 signatories to a letter to US President Barack Obama urging US intervention in the Libyan civil war.

== Personal ==
He is married to Deborah Ford, daughter of Daniel W. Hardy. She is an assistant chaplain at Addenbrooke's Hospital, part of the Cambridge University Hospital system. They have three children, Rebecca, Rachel and Daniel.

He is an Anglican Lay Minister at St Andrew's Church, Cherry Hinton, Cambridge.

== Bibliography ==
=== Books, monographs ===
- Barth and God's Story: Biblical Narrative and the Theological Method of Karl Barth in the Church Dogmatics. 1981.
- A Long Rumour of Wisdom: Re-describing Theology. Cambridge University Press. 1992. p. 32. ISBN 978-0-521-43570-3.
- God in the University. University of Leicester. 1998. p. 22.
- Theology: A Very Short Introduction. Oxford University Press. 1999. ISBN 978-0-19-285384-4. "david f ford."
- Self and Salvation: Being Transformed. Cambridge University Press. 1999. ISBN 978-0-521-41607-8.
  - Review by John Webster, Scottish Journal of Theology (2001), 54: 548–559.
- Jesus: A Reader. Oxford University Press. 2002. ISBN 978-0-19-289316-1. (ed. with Mike Higton)
- The Promise of Scriptural Reasoning. Blackwell. 2006. (ed. with C. C. Pecknold; includes chapter "An Inter-Faith Wisdom: Scriptural Reasoning Between Jews, Christians and Muslims")
- Christian Wisdom: Desiring God and Learning in Love. Cambridge University Press. 2007. ISBN 978-0-521-87545-5.
  - Review in Studies in Christian Ethics (November 2009) 22:4, 504–506.
- Shaping Theology: Engagements in a Religious and Secular World. Blackwell. 2007.
- Musics of Belonging: The Poetry of Micheal O'Siadnail. Carysfort Press. 2007. (ed. with Marc Caball, includes chapter "Life, Work, and Reception")
- The Modern Theologians: An Introduction to Christian Theology in the Twentieth Century. Blackwell. 1997. p. 1. ISBN 978-0-631-19591-7. "david f ford."; 3d ed. (ed., with Rachel Muers) pub. 2005
- Scripture and Theology: Reading Texts, Seeking Wisdom. SCM. 2003. ISBN 978-0-334-02920-5. (ed. with Graham Stanton)
- Fields of Faith: Theology and Religious Studies for the Twenty-First Century. Cambridge University Press. 2005. ISBN 978-0-521-84737-7. (ed. with Ben Quash and Janet Martin Soskice)
- The Shape of Living: Spiritual Directions for Everyday Life. Baker Books. 1997. ISBN 978-0-8010-6519-4. (with Susan Howatch) 2nd ed. published 2004
- Jubilate: Theology in Practice. London: Darton Longman & Todd. 2004. (with Daniel W. Hardy). Published in US as Praising and Knowing God, Philadelphia: Westminster Press, 2005.
- Barth and God's Story: Biblical Narrative and the Theological Method of Karl Barth in the Church Dogmatics. Wipf & Stock Publishers. 2008. ISBN 978-1-60608-056-6.
- Meaning and Truth in II Corinthians. Wipf & Stock Publishers. 2008. ISBN 978-1-55635-813-5. (with Frances M. Young)
- Hardy, Daniel W. (2010). Wording a Radiance: Parting Conversations on God and the Church. SCM. ISBN 978-0-334-04208-2. (ed. by David Ford, Deborah Ford, Peter Ochs, published in paperback as Attracting God's Light: A Parting Theology)
  - Review by Michael Barnes in Thinking Faith: The Online Journal of the British Jesuits, 14 January 2011.
- The Future of Christian Theology. Wiley-Blackwell. 2011. ISBN 978-1-4051-4272-4.
  - Review by Jason Byassee in The Christian Century 128:9 (3 May 2011), 33.
- The Modern Theologians Reader. John Wiley & Sons. 2011. ISBN 978-1-4051-7111-3. (with Mike Higton and Simeon Zahl)
- The Gospel of John: A Theological Commentary. Baker Publishing Group. 2021. ISBN 9781540964083.

=== Book chapters ===
- "Tragedy and Atonement" in Christ, Ethics, and Tragedy: Essays in honour of Donald MacKinnon, Kenneth Surin, ed. Cambridge University Press, 1989. ISBN 978-0-521-34137-0.
- "Third Epoch: The Future of Discourse in Jewish–Christian Relations" (with Peter Ochs), in Challenges in Jewish–Christian Relations, James K. Aitken and Edward Kessler, eds. New York: Paulist Press, 2006, pp. 153–170.
- "Developing Scriptural Reasoning Further", in Scripture, Reason, and the Contemporary Islam-West Encounter: Studying the 'Other', Understanding the 'Self', Basit Bilal Koshul and Steven Kepnes, eds. New York: Palgrave Macmillan, 2007, pp. 201–219.
- "God and Our Public Life: A scriptural wisdom", in Liberating Texts? Sacred Scriptures in Public Life, Sebastian C. H. Kim and Jonathan Draper, eds. London: SPCK, 2008, pp. 29–56.
- "Theology" in The Routledge Companion to the Study of Religions (2nd edition, 2009), John Hinnells, ed. Routledge, ISBN 0-415-47327-6.
- "Theology and Religious Studies for a Multifaith and Secular Society", in Theology and Religious Studies in Higher Education: Global Perspectives, Darlene L. Bird and Simon G. Smith, eds. London: Continuum, 2009, pp. 31–43.
- "Paul Ricoeur: A Biblical Philosopher on Jesus", in Jesus and Philosophy: New Essays, Paul K. Moser, ed. Cambridge University Press, 2009, pp. 169–193.
- "Foreword" to New Perspectives for Evangelical Theology: Engaging God, Scripture, and the World. Routledge, 2009.
- "Foreword" in New Perspectives for Evangelical Theology: Engaging with God, Scripture, and the World, Tom Greggs, ed. Routledge, 2010. ISBN 978-0-415-47732-1.

=== Selected articles, papers ===
- "What Happens in the Eucharist?", Scottish Journal of Theology 8:3 (1995), 359–81.
- "A Messiah for the Third Millennium," Modern Theology 16 (2000), 75–90.
- "The Responsibilities of Universities in a Religious and Secular World", in Studies in Christian Ethics 17:1 (April 2044), 22–37, doi:10.1177/095394680401700102.
- "A Wisdom for Anglican Life: Lambeth 1998 to Lambeth 2008 and Beyond", in Journal of Anglican Studies 4:2 (2006), 137–156.
- "An Interfaith Wisdom: Scriptural Reasoning Between Jews, Christians and Muslims", in Modern Theology 22:3 (July 2006), 345–366.
- "Gospel in Context: Among Many Faiths", in Pilgrim: Magazine of the Friends of the Church in India, No. 30 (March–April 2007), 3–7.
- "God and Our Public Life: A Scriptural Wisdom", in International Journal of Public Theology 1:1 (2007), 63–81.
- "God’s Power and Human Flourishing: A Biblical Inquiry after Charles Taylor’s A Secular Age", 2008
- "A Muscat Manifesto: Seeking Interfaith Wisdom", Cambridge Inter-Faith Programme and Kalam Research & Media, 2009.
- "Where is Wise Theological Creativity to be Found? Thoughts on 25 Years of Modern Theology and the Twenty-First Century Prospect", in Modern Theology 26:1 (January 2010), 67–75.
- "Faith Seeking Wisdom: How My Mind Has Changed" in The Christian Century (18 November 2010).

=== Selected lectures ===
- "Knowledge, Meaning and the World's Greatest Challenges: Reinventing Cambridge University in the Twenty-first Century", lecture at Emmanuel College, Cambridge, 14 February 2003.
- "The Qur'an: A New Translation", speech given at the launch of The Qur'an: A New Translation at SOAS, University of London, 13 May 2004.
- "Gospel in Many Contexts: Among Many Faiths" at Fulcrum Conference Islington 2006.
- "Faith, Scriptures and Universities in an Inter-Faith and Secular Society", and "'A Fresh Intensity: Inter-Faith Engagement with Scriptures", lectures at The University of Sheffield, February 2007.
- "Seeking Muslim, Christian and Jewish Wisdom in the Fifteenth, Twenty-first and Fifty-eighth centuries: A Muscat Manifesto", lecture at the Sultan Qaboos Grand Mosque, Muscat, Oman, 20 April 2009. *"What is Required of a Religious Leader Today?", lecture at the Institute of Shariah Studies, Muscat, Oman, 20 April 2009.
- "Jews, Christians and Muslims Meet around their Scriptures: An Inter-Faith Practice for the 21st Century", The Fourth Pope John Paul II Annual Lecture on Interreligious Understanding, 5 April 2011.

== Quotes ==
- "At the heart of healthy inter-faith engagement is a triple dynamic: going deeper into your own faith, deeper into each other's, and deeper into action for the common good of humanity".
- " Few things are likely to be more important for the twenty-first century than wise faith among the world's religious communities. That calls for fuller understanding, better education, and a commitment to the flourishing of our whole planet".

Academic offices
Preceded by Stephen Sykes	Regius Professor of Divinity at the University of Cambridge; 1991 – c. 2015	Succeeded by Ian A. McFarland
Preceded by Michael Banner	Bampton Lecturer; 2015	Succeeded by George Pattison
