= Scriptural reasoning =

Religious studies of scriptures

Scriptural Reasoning ("SR") is one type of interdisciplinary, interfaith scriptural reading. It is an evolving practice of diverse methodologies in which Christians, Jews, Muslims, Hindus, Buddhists, Sikhs, Baháʼís, and members of other faiths, meet in groups to study their sacred scriptures and oral traditions together, and to explore the ways in which such study can help them understand and respond to particular contemporary issues. Originally developed by theologians and religious philosophers as a means of fostering post-critical and postliberal corrections to patterns of modern reasoning, it has now spread beyond academic circles.

Theologians of different faiths have strongly challenged the claims made by some of Scriptural Reasoning's founder practitioners that they have requisite knowledge of ancient traditions of Islamic, Jewish and Christian exegesis and, on that basis, "not only the capacity, but also the authority to correct" or "repair" modernist binarist or fundamentalist interpretations of the Bible or Quran. Published articles by academics have also criticised some Scriptural Reasoning projects in the United Kingdom for alleged lack of parity between participating religions and instrumentalising of sacred texts for political agendas and money, while other scholars have alleged a history in Scriptural Reasoning from earlier SR conferences in the United States of exclusion and bullying of Christian theologian critics, and in later SR projects in the UK of victimisation of Muslim theologian whistleblowers.

== Method ==
Scriptural Reasoning involves participants from multiple religious traditions meeting, very often in small groups, to read and discuss passages from their sacred texts and oral traditions (e.g., the Tanakh, Talmud, New Testament, Vedas, Qur'an, Hadith, or Guru Granth Sahib). The texts will often relate to a common topic—say, the figure of Abraham, or consideration of legal and moral issues of property-holding. Participants discuss the content of the texts, and will often explore the variety of ways in which their religious communities have worked with them and continue to work with them, and the ways in which those texts might shape their understanding of and engagement with a range of contemporary issues.

A participant from any one religious tradition might therefore:

- Discuss with the other participants his or her own readings of the texts from his or her own tradition
- Discuss with them their attempts to make sense of the texts from his or her own tradition and
- In turn discuss with them the texts from their own traditions.

=== Features ===
Most forms of SR exhibit the following basic features:

- SR does not ask participants from different faith traditions to focus upon areas in which they are most nearly in agreement, or to bracket their commitments to the deepest sources of their traditions' distinct identities. SR allows participants to remain faithful to the deepest identity-forming practices and allegiances of their religious communities.
- SR provides a context in which the participants can discuss those commitments, and perhaps even become more self-aware about them. SR sessions therefore often highlight and explore differences and disagreements between religious tradition, and give rise to serious argument—in order to promote what has been called 'better quality disagreement'.
- SR does not assume any consensus between the participants as to how they understand the nature, authority or proper interpretation of the texts in front of them. Participants do not have to assume, for instance, that the Bible fulfills the same role for Christians as does the Qur'an for Muslims or the Tanakh for Jews.
- SR is said to rely upon the existence of honesty, openness and trust amongst the participants, and more generally upon the growth of friendship among the participants in order to provide an appropriate context for disagreement. It is therefore sometimes said that the key to SR is 'not consensus but friendship'.
- In order to encourage these relationships, the practice of Scriptural Reasoning is often located geographically with a view to engendering mutual hospitality—for example, by meeting in neutral academic spaces such as universities, or by peripatetically rotating between the houses of worship of different faiths. SR groups try to preserve an ethos of mutual hospitality with each participant being both host and guest, and to ensure parity of leadership, oversight or ownership.

=== Metaphors ===
To leave space for the variety of ways in which Scriptural Reasoning may be practiced and developed, SR practitioners often find it more fruitful to characterize SR open-endedly in terms of metaphors, often drawn from the Abrahamic traditions themselves.

==== Tent of meeting ====
Scriptural Reasoning has sometimes been described as a "tent of meeting"—a Biblical mishkan (Hebrew: משׁכן; Arabic: مسكن)—a reference to the story of Genesis 18. Steven Kepnes, a Jewish philosopher, writes:

Participants in SR practice come to it as both representatives of academic institutions and particular "houses" (churches, mosques, synagogues) of worship. SR meets, however, outside of these institutions and houses in special times and in separate spaces that are likened to Biblical "tents of meeting". Practitioners come together in these tents of meeting to read and reason with scriptures. They then return to their academic and religious institutions and to the world with renewed energy and wisdom for these institutions and the world.

==== Hearth ====
Scriptural Reasoning has been compared to gathering around the warmth of a hearth, where—Ochs explains—the hearth represents "those dimensions of life that members of a religion turn to in times of crisis, tension, or uncertainty in the hope of drawing nearer to the source of their deepest values and identities." This metaphor builds on the rabbinic notion of Torah as a "fire", drawn from texts like Jeremiah 23:29—"Is not my word like fire, says the LORD?" and Deuteronomy 33:2, as interpreted midrashically by the rabbis. In Sifre Devarim 343, the editor concludes that "the words of Torah are compared to fire" before developing this comparison in various respects. Most relevant to SR is that, "Just as a person that is too close to a fire is burned and if he is too far coldness [results], so too with the words of the Torah. As long as a person is involved in them, they are life-giving, but when one removes himself from them, they kill him..."

In this vein, James and Rashkover write:

The same sacredness and life that rewards l'shma study can also be the cause of absolutism and violence when a community feels under threat. Scripture is powerful: "Is not my word like fire, says the Lord?" (Jer. 23:29). The same fire that warms and gives life can also kill and destroy. Ochs discerns that the impulse to guard the sacredness of scripture, even violently, is often an index of the community's love of their sacred scriptures as a primal source of divine life. Rather than unleashing the destroying fire of scriptural passion, SR is a practice of offering a measure of scripture's warmth to others.

More recently, Ochs has generalized his concept of scripture into that of a hearth, "those dimensions of life that members of a religion turn to in times of crisis, tension, or uncertainty in the hope of drawing nearer to the source of their deepest values and identities." SR, in this view, becomes a prototype of a broader family of "hearth-to-hearth" engagements.

=== Purposes ===
It is impossible to give a definitive or authoritative account of the purpose of SR. Scriptural Reasoning is first and foremost a practice, and individuals and communities may engage in a practice for many and various reasons, while furthermore the purposes or agendas in SR of some practitioners have been contested or rejected by others. Moreover, the actual effects of a practice may outstrip the intentions of its practitioners. Thus Scriptural Reasoners frequently emphasize that doing and experimenting with SR as a practice logically precedes theoretical accounts of its grounds or function. According to Nicholas Adams, 'Scriptural reasoning is a practice which can be theorised, not a theory which can be put into practice. More accurately, it is a variety of practices whose interrelations can be theorised to an extent, but not in any strong sense of fully explanatory theory.' Peter Ochs makes the same point with reference to a midrash on Exodus 24:7 in b. Shab. 88a:

In the book of Exodus, when Moses tried to deliver the Ten Commandments for the second time, the Israelites respond with the declaration naaseh v'nishmah! Literally, their declaration means "We shall do it and understand it," but, it was more likely an idiomatic expression for "We are on the job!" or "Consider it done!" The later rabbinic sages offered a homiletic rereading: "We shall first act and then understand"...We have nurtured SR in the same fashion, seeking to experiment with many forms of practice before discovering the one that best fits our goals and working over many years to refine it. We proceeded through experimentation first and only later through theoretical reflection.

Nevertheless, it is possible to distinguish three commonly-cited and not mutually-exclusive purposes.

==== L'shma: For its own sake or for God's sake ====
According to David Ford, one should practice SR because studying scripture is intrinsically valuable. On this view, one practices SR for the same reasons and in the same spirit that most traditional Abrahamic readers have studied their scriptures. David Ford makes this point using the Hebrew term "l'shma":

This practice of shared reading could be done for its own sake—or, better, for God's sake. Each of the three traditions has its own ways of valuing the study of its scriptures as something worth doing quite apart from any ulterior motive. Scriptural Reasoning might of course have all sorts of practical implications, but to do it above all for God's sake—as Jews say, l’shma—encourages purity of intention and discourages the mere instrumentalising of inter-faith engagement.

The term l'shma, which literally means "for the name", is ambiguous, capable of signifying Torah study "for its own sake" or "for God's sake".

Under the heading of SR as study l'shma, we might include those who approach SR as a practice that promotes the development of "wisdom", a central theme of David Ford's work on SR. In the same vein Peter Ochs speaks of SR as "open[ing] unexpected levels of textual and hermeneutical inquiry...for its own sake", an opening made possible by the affective warmth of SR study circles. Others frame SR as a kind of ritual practice or even something approaching an act of worship. Marianne Moyaert, for example, argues that SR can be characterized as a formative "ritualized practice".

Study l'shma is motivated by desire, by love for the scriptures and/or for God. For this reason, by inviting participants to share l'shma study together, SR provides what Ochs calls "a venue for members of different traditions or modes of inquiry to share their affection for scripture." This affective aspect of SR, in turn, contributes to SR's capacity to form unexpected interreligious friendships.

The most likely source of these friendships is that the style of Formational Scriptural Reasoning tempts participants (often unawares) to reveal at least a bit of the warmth and ingenuousness they display in intimate settings of scripture study among coreligionists at home.

==== To repair academic methods and logics ====
As originally conceived, SR was an academic practice involving theologians, religious philosophers, and text scholars, and was said to be aimed at 'repairing' or 'correcting' patterns of modern philosophical and theological reasoning. These patterns of reasoning persist both in the Western academy and in religious traditions influenced by modernity. Thus according to Peter Ochs, SR was originally intended to repair academic methods of study and the habits of mind that they presuppose.

For the founders of Scriptural Reasoning, the original purpose was to repair what they judged to be inadequate academic methods for teaching scripture and scripturally-based religions, such as the Abrahamic religions...Over time, both Scriptural Reasoning and Textual Reasoning acquired new purposes as participants discovered additional consequences of these practices.

Nicholas Adams characterizes SR as a practice of "reparative reasoning" capable of advancing "the pragmatic repair of secular universalism". Building on this description, Ochs frequently emphasizes SR's reparative capacity to accustom practitioners to new ways of reasoning and habits of mind. He says that "the primary purpose of Scriptural reasoning is to correct "binarism in modern Western civilization and in religious groups that have, willy-nilly, adopted this binarism as if it were an engine of indigenous religious discourse and belief." Binarism is this logical tendency to assume that difference entails opposition. As Ochs says, "All I mean by "binarism" is a strong tendency to overstate and over-generalize the usefulness of either/or distinctions." SR repairs this tendency, in part, by training practitioners in alternative habits of mind:

[To affirm] that scripture tolerates, say, two meanings of a crucial verse, and not only one, is already to soften the rage that such participants may feel towards those whose readings different from theirs. In place of rage, such participants may adopt, for example, a superior and patronizing—but nonviolent—attitude towards these others as errant, but guilty only of a weaker reading of scripture rather than a reading that defies the very truth of things.

SR also tends to repair the binarism that is a persistent feature of modern religious traditions.

Scriptural Reasoning is stimulated by the perception, furthermore, that the religious institutions that reside in the modern West have tended to assimilate these binarist tendencies into their theological discourses. One result is that many movements labeled "fundamentalist" display tendencies to a modern Western-style binarism that has been written into the tissue of traditional religious practices and discourses.

SR thus implies a distinction between fundamentalism and traditionalism: the former tends to apply when the indigenous logic of a religious tradition has been superseded by modern binarism. For this reason, SR can undermine fundamentalism without attacking religious tradition per se, and indeed, purporting to draw its repair from traditional texts and interpretive practices. SR, by contrast, undermines fundamentalism while adopting an optimistic posture towards religious tradition. "Liberal" religion itself tends to operate with the same modern logic; indeed, the opposition between "liberal" and "fundamentalist" forms of religion is plausible, in part, because both operate with similar logics. For this reason, as Kepnes says, SR is "neither Liberal nor Fundamentalist". This is one reason that SR has often been described as a 'postliberal' or 'postcritical' theological or philosophical movement.

==== To further interfaith peace and understanding ====
Its purpose is sometimes described as 'humbling and creative' interfaith encounter or 'deeper mutual understanding'.

== History ==
Scriptural Reasoning is just one type of inter-textual discussion of the sacred scriptures of different religions, something which have been practiced by many scholars over many centuries. In the case of SR, it began as an intra-faith practice of Textual Reasoning by Jewish academics of Jewish texts, before becoming an inter-faith activity of Scriptural Reasoning when the conversation was joined by members of other religions. Over time SR has been developed by different scholars in a variety of diverse and contrasting ways.

=== Origins: Textual Reasoning ===
Scriptural Reasoning has roots in a variety of classical practices of scriptural interpretation, particularly rabbinic midrash. Its proximate origins, however, lie in a related practice, "Textual Reasoning" (TR), which involved Jewish philosophers reading Talmud in conversation with scholars of rabbinics. Peter Ochs was one of the leading participants in Textual Reasoning (TR). As James and Rashkover say,

Textual Reasoning (TR) emerged in the 1980s from conversations among Jewish philosophers disappointed by the failure of modern Western philosophy to provide principles of inquiry capable of addressing the pressing concerns of living Jewish communities. These philosophers developed a novel practice of Jewish text study rooted in the Jewish textual tradition itself which they aspired to activate as a source of communal repair. Textual Reasoning brought text scholars familiar with rabbinic reading practices together with Jewish philosophers skilled in illuminating logics of reading and reasoning.

In 1990, Ochs and his colleagues founded what they then called the "Postmodern Jewish Philosophy Network" which hosted lively online exchanges, biannual meetings, an online journal. In 1996 they adopted the term "textual reasoning" for this practice, evoking classical Jewish practices of interpretation, and renamed their group the Society for Textual Reasoning. In 2002, they founded a Journal of Textual Reasoning.

Textual Reasoning already displayed many features of what would become SR. According to Ochs, these include a tendency to pursue text study "for its own sake"; to both seek the plain sense of a text and to go explore various other dimensions of meaning; to value intense individual thought and group dialogue; and a combination of scholarly discipline with humor and laughter. "Textual Reasoning" is often distinguished, as a Jewish practice of study, from Biblical Reasoning (Christian) and Qur'anic Reasoning (Muslim).

=== Beginnings of SR ===
According to James and Rashkover, "Textual Reasoning gave birth to Scriptural Reasoning (SR) as early Textual Reasoners developed friendships with Christian and Muslim scholars and began to experiment with reading scripture together." Ochs recounts the early history:

Beginning in 1994, a group of scholars of Islam, Judaism, and Christianity joined together to discover a way to conduct dialogue across the borders of these three Abrahamic scriptural traditions ... We met for five years of biannual study until we discovered and refined the best method, which we called "Scriptural Reasoning" (SR).

The term "Scriptural Reasoning" was coined by Peter Ochs to distinguish the interfaith practice of scripture study from its tradition-specific antecedents. Ochs also argues, however, that SR presupposes parallel formation in practices of study across difference like TR:

In its broadest meaning, SR includes two sub-practices: study-across-difference within a single scriptural tradition and study across the borders of different scriptural traditions ... [T]he former, which we label "Textual Reasoning" (or TR), also makes an irreplaceable contribution to the overall practice of SR.

The international Society for Scriptural Reasoning (SSR) was founded in 1995. The founders include Ochs himself, David F. Ford, Daniel W. Hardy, and Basit Koshul. In 2001, the SSR established a Journal of Scriptural Reasoning to publish research into SR and to display the academic fruits of SR as a practice.

=== Developments ===
Scriptural Reasoning began as an academic practice and expanded rapidly in academic circles. SR scholars formed an "additional meeting group" at the American Academy of Religion which later became the official Scriptural Reasoning Program Unit.

They began a Scriptural Reasoning Theory Group at Cambridge University, in partnership with the Cambridge Interfaith Program. It was renamed the Scriptural Reasoning in the University group in 2007 and continued meeting through 2020.) This group focused on applying Scriptural Reasoning in academia and producing original scholarship about SR. Out of this group emerged the Scripture & Violence Project, which has published academic work on the relationship between violence and the Abrahamic scriptures and makes available resources for laypeople to engage with these issues.

Other academic developments of SR include a Scriptural Reasoning project at the Center of Theological Inquiry in Princeton, which examined SR and the history of medieval scriptural commentaries; the Scriptures in Dialogue project founded by Leo Baeck College; and the SR Oxford group of the Scriptural Reasoning Society ("Oxford School") founded by the Interfaith Alliance UK.

Scriptural Reasoning has also become a "civic practice" in the community, examples of which include the Central Virginia Scriptural Reasoning Group sponsored by Eastern Mennonite University, at St Ethelburga's Centre for Reconciliation and Peace at St Ethelburga's Bishopsgate, the SR Camden and SR Westminster groups of the Scriptural Reasoning Society sponsored by Camden Faith Communities Partnership, Liberal Judaism (United Kingdom) and different places of worship in London.

Civic developments from Scriptural Reasoning carrying different names, include the Faith and Citizenship programme of London Metropolitan University, and the Three Faiths Forum, which develops modes of scriptural study for young people in schools and local communities.

One early fruit of Scriptural Reasoning was Dabru Emet, a document on Jewish-Christian relations published in 2000 in The New York Times. This document, authored by four Jewish scholars—Peter Ochs, David Novak, Tikva Frymer-Kensky, and Michael Singer—and signed by over 200 rabbis and scholars from most strands of Judaism, aimed to lay the groundwork for more sympathetic and productive engagement between Judaism and Christianity.

In 2007, independent Islamic authorities in London issued a fatwa advising Muslims about participation in the practice of Scriptural Reasoning.

The Rose Castle Foundation was founded in 2014 to equip leaders for peace and reconciliation work between the Abrahamic religions, with Scriptural Reasoning being central to its training. The Rose Castle Foundation also maintains a database of SR groups around the world.

== Criticisms ==
Criticisms of Scriptural Reasoning which have been made by academics from different traditions address some of its founding practitioners' claims to their having requisite knowledge of ancient traditions of Islamic, Jewish and Christian exegesis and, on that basis, the purported authority to "correct" or "repair" binarist or fundamentalist interpretations of Scripture. Scholars also challenge SR's underlying presuppositions, and raise concerns about the dynamics of power, money and control in SR's practical outworking.

=== Christian ===
Theologian Adrian Thatcher has questioned whether Scriptural Reasoning flattens theological differences in the way the three traditions approach their respective Scriptures, arguing that "Christian people are not the people of a book, even a very holy book. They are people of a Savior, the One who reveals a loving God who, by God's Spirit, remakes and renews humankind in the image of the Son...Its danger lies in the implication that the relation between believers and their respective sacred texts lies along an axis of similarity". He notes "the paucity of references to Jesus Christ" in the essays in The Promise of Scriptural Reasoning (see, e.g., Ford and Pecknold 2006), and asking whether this "may indicate ... the further erosion of Christocentric biblical interpretation."

Christian theologian, James M. Gustafson, questions the claim implied by Peter Ochs' descriptions of Scriptural Reasoning that it "has not only the capacity, but also the authority to correct 'modernist reason'"—and asking whether Scriptural Reasoning has been sufficiently open to the critical discourses fostered in modernity. He writes, "One is startled to read 'scriptural reasoning' in the singular ... the use of 'scriptural reasoning' implies a canon within the canon, the parameters and perimeters which are undisclosed". His points have been responded to by S. Mark Heim.

Christina Grenholm and Daniel Patte critique Scriptural Reasoning's presuppositions of Christian self-understanding and context for biblical interpretation. They write:

The so-called "scriptural reasoning" movement presupposes Christianity as a separate nation with clear borders and set markers and Scripture as its authorised map ... but without adopting the critical perspective that would reveal that there are different kinds of "scriptural reasonings"

Catholic theologian, Gavin D'Costa offers a four-fold criticism of David Ford's presentation of Scriptural Reasoning. Firstly, he asserts that Christological and ecclesiological doctrine necessary for Christian biblical reading is marginalized by SR. He comments:

Ford's tent insinuates (and nothing stronger can be said here) the logic of liberalism: the Bible has no binding authority, nor has the church's reading of it got primary status, nor can Christian scripture/Christ actually narrate the other texts of scriptures: Jewish and Muslim.

D'Costa moreover argues that "SR seems to eschew any canopy over the project, but the metaphysics of Christian scriptural reading generates precisely such a canopy". Furthermore, he asserts that "there is a vaguely pluralistic agenda present" and that "SR is analogised [by Ford] to shared worship". D'Costa states that SR neglects scope for witness and evangelism. His critique has been responded to by Darren Sarisky.

=== Muslim ===
Under the title, The Broken Promise of Scriptural Reasoning, Muslim theologian, Muhammad Al-Hussaini, presents a critique of David Ford's Anglican-led Scriptural Reasoning initiatives, which he argues lack parity between participant religions, have been characterised by colonialist politics of control, and which he categorises as 'amalīyya fāsida (Arabic: عملية فاسدة), "corrupt practice". He states that Fordian Scriptural Reasoning has "No minhag/minhaj, no timeless established Judaeo-Islamic discipline of dialectical exegesis traditionis, of thickly-reading holy books using instruments of philology, grammar, received oral tradition and sensitive exposition of concentric layers of literal through to allegorical readings of a verse". He contends, "Instead, Ford's Anglican-led SR becomes merely a poor kind of inter-faith Protestant Bible study fashioned within the competency limitations of its self-appointed leadership". He expresses concern at what he suggests "appeared to be SR's failure to respect indigenous ways of reading Islamic Scripture, namely alongside hadith and classical commentaries", and further asserts, "Over time I became increasingly offended at the instrumentalising of biblical and Quranic materials for political and funding agendas".

Muslim theologian, Timothy Winter, argues that the presuppositions and motivations of Scriptural Reasoning are alien to the Islamic context. He states, "Scriptural reasoning is not method, but rather a promiscuous openness to methods of a kind unfamiliar to Islamic conventions of reading". He also asserts that Scriptural Reasoning's claims to correct secular reasonings through a re-engagement with traditional reading have little resonance for Islam that has not experienced such changes in any meaningful sense. He writes, "There cannot be a 'return to Scripture' in Peter Ochs's sense, since the Qur’an has nowhere been abandoned, and Muslim interlocutors in SR are much more likely to feel part of an unbroken tradition than advocates of a latter-day ressourcement". He asserts the closer proximity of Jewish-Islamic traditional exegesis: "The three-way dynamic helps to reduce binary polarisations, but it does carry a bias towards the 'Semitic'. Muslim-Jewish relations turn out to be privileged for several reasons which may relate to this traditional category". He goes on to state, "The cognate quality of Arabic and Hebrew, which frequently enriches the practice of comparative SR", but states, "If SR tends to exclude the search for precision, and to celebrate an ‘irremediable vagueness’ (Ochs), Muslims may demur".

Muslim theologian, Mohamed Elsharkawy, positively contrasts practices of Scriptural Reasoning in different contexts but sees SR in the United Kingdom as particularly "heavily contaminated with a Church of England Orientalism and a state counter-extremism agenda". He writes:

The monied UK interfaith agenda exists in part to give credibility to a declining Church of England, and David Ford's Scriptural Reasoning openly admits its Anglican origins and dominant polity. Funding of some Church-led Scriptural Reasoning projects with British government counter-extremism cash betrays the overarching agenda towards Islam, Muslims and our classical hermeneutics, as do proposed grand interfaith projects with the likes of Tony Blair. In place of our ancient tafsir al-qur'an, humbly seeking Allah's multifaceted meanings in every Arabic verse of His Book, Fordian Scriptural Reasoning is at times crude reading with an agenda, and those who have spoken out against this have been hurt.

He asserts that from the early days of SR there has been exclusion and bullying of some Christian theologians and later Muslim scholars who have raised concerns about alleged malfeasance within Scriptural Reasoning projects, and he proposes a "Reform of Scriptural Reasoning" through repentance, engagement with SR's critics and an end to what he calls "the endless uncritical self-marketing of Scriptural Reasoning by a dominant clique".

Elsharkawy asserts, "There are serious issues of the scholarly integrity of Scriptural Reasoning when so much of the allegedly 'independent academic literature' advocating for it is published in journals like Modern Theology, the Journal of Scriptural Reasoning and other publications on whose editorial boards sit David Ford, Peter Ochs and other SR promoters themselves! How are these independent reliable sources? Have they ever had the honesty to publish work by the opponents of SR? Rather, along with its colonialism, the defining characteristics of Scriptural Reasoning in some contexts have been the gatekeepers and minders of the 'brand', the vigorous and expensive marketing of SR, 'invitation-only' tactics for some events, and the excluding and in some cases harming the academic lives of some of its Christian and Muslim critics. So much for 'better quality disagreement'".
