= Michael Welker =

German Protestant theologian

Michael Welker (born 20 November 1947 in Erlangen, Germany) is a German Protestant theologian and a senior professor of Systematic Theology (Dogmatics).

Biblical Theology and “general theory” are the main foci of his research. He reached a wider audience with publications about the Spirit of God, creation (especially in dialog with the sciences), the role of the church in pluralistic societies, resurrection and the Protestant view of the Lord’s Supper, but also with his work related to Alfred North Whitehead and process theology, to Niklas Luhmann and systems theory.

== Biography, Academic and Ecclesiastical Activities ==
He went to school in West Berlin and in Grünstadt (Western Germany) and was ordained a minister of the Protestant church of the Palatinate.

In 1973 he received a PhD degree in Systematic Theology in Tübingen, Prof. Moltmann having been his advisor. In 1978 he received another PhD degree under supervision of the philosopher Prof. Henrich. In 1980 he completed his Habilitation in Tübingen, with his discussion of Whitehead and process philosophy.

From 1983 to 1987 he was professor for Systematic Theology in Tübingen, 1987–1991 he held the chair for Reformed Theology in Münster, and from 1991 to 2013 he was a professor for dogmatics in Heidelberg. Since 2013 he has been a senior professor at Heidelberg University and, since 2005, managing director of the Forschungszentrum Internationale und Interdisziplinäre Theologie (FIIT) in Heidelberg, which he co-founded. He lectured at the University of Chicago (1984), McMaster University (1985), Princeton Theological Seminary (1988 and 1995), the Center of Theological Inquiry, Princeton (1997, 1999), and at Harvard Divinity School (2001). In 2003 he was offered the position of the director of the Center of Theological Inquiry (CTI) in Princeton. 1996–2006 he was director of the Internationales Wissenschaftsforum Heidelberg (IWH). The University of Debrecen awarded him an honorary PhD degree, and so did the South African North-West University in Potchefstroom. From 2004 to 2016 he was a member of the chamber of theology of the council of the Protestant Church in Germany (EKD) and judge at the constitutional court of the EKD; since 2006 he has been a regular member of the Heidelberg Academy of Sciences and an affiliated member of the Finnish Academy of Arts and Letters. He was granted the Medal of Heidelberg University. Since 1984 he has given lectures in the USA, in several European countries, Korea, China, South Africa and Brazil; since 1991 he has given numerous endowed lectures (Harvard, Princeton, Yale, Chicago, Edinburgh, Beijing, Taipei, Canberra among others). During his commitment with the IWH and the CTI he organized numerous projects of international and interdisciplinary cooperation, research projects extended over several years, publications, especially concerning the dialog between theology and the sciences, and he still does so in connection with the FIIT.

In 2009 he created the Global Network of Research Centers for Theology, Religious and Christian Studies.

== Selected works ==
=== Books ===
- Welker, Michael (1994). God the Spirit. Minneapolis, MN: Fortress Press. ISBN 9780800627669. OCLC 30030391.
- ——— (1999). Creation and Reality. Minneapolis, MN: Fortress Press. ISBN 9780800626280. OCLC 40707065.
- ——— (2000). What Happens in Holy Communion?. Grand Rapids, MI: Eerdmans. ISBN 9780802846020. OCLC 43445519.
- ———; Polkinghorne, John (2001). Faith in the Living God: A Dialogue. London: SPCK. ISBN 9780800634346. OCLC 47267159.
- ———; Polkinghorne, John (2019). Faith in the Living God: A Dialogue, 2nd ed. Eugene, OR: Cascade Books. ISBN 9781532661822.
- ——— (2013). God the Revealed: Christology. Grand Rapids, MI: Eerdmans. ISBN 9780802871572.
- ——— (2021). In God's Image: An Anthropology of the Spirit. Grand Rapids, MI: Eerdmans. ISBN 9780802878663.
- (2025) What Might Make Life Better?: On Character Formation, Ethical Education, and the Communication of Values in Late Modern Pluralistic Societies

=== As editor ===
- ———; Willis-Watkins, David, eds. (1999). Toward the Future of Reformed Theology: tasks, topics, traditions. Grand Rapids, MI: Eerdmans. ISBN 9780802844675. OCLC 39961646.
- ——— (2000). The End of the World and the Ends of God: Science and Theology on Eschatology. Harrisburg, PA: Trinity Press International. ISBN 9781563383120. OCLC 42923579.
- ———; Peters, Ted; Russell, Robert John, eds. (2002). Resurrection - Theological and Scientific Assessments. Grand Rapids, MI: Eerdmans. ISBN 9780802805195. OCLC 50149708.
- ———; Alston, Wallace M., eds. (2003). Reformed theology: identity and ecumenicity. Grand Rapids, MI: Eerdmans. ISBN 9780802847768. OCLC 52121471.
- ———; Schweitzer, Friedrich, eds. (2005). Reconsidering the Boundaries between Theological Disciplines. Münster: LIT. ISBN 9783825874711. OCLC 60676828.
- ———; Volf, Miroslav, eds. (2006). God's Life in Trinity. Minneapolis, MN: Fortress Press. ISBN 9780800638238. OCLC 63390674.
- ———, ed. (2006). The Work of the Spirit: Pneumatology and Pentecostalism. Grand Rapids, MI: Eerdmans. ISBN 9780802803870. OCLC 71266378.
- ———, ed. (2014). The Depth of the Human Person: a multidisciplinary approach. Grand Rapids, MI: Eerdmans. ISBN 9781467440660. OCLC 920466966.
- ———, ed. (2014). Quests for Freedom: Biblical-Historical-Contemporary. Neukirchen-Vluyn: Neukirchener Verlag. ISBN 9783788728311.
- ———, ed. (2019). Quests for Freedom: Biblical, Historical, Contemporary, 2nd ed. Eugene, OR: Cascade Books. ISBN 9781532653971.
- ———; Witte, John; Pickard, Stephen, eds. (2020). The Impact of Religion on Character Formation, Ethical Education, and the Communication of Values in Late Modern Pluralistic Societies. Leipzig: Evangelische Verlagsanstalt / Wipf & Stock. ISBN 978-3-374-06410-6.
- ———; von Hagen, Jürgen; Witte, John; Pickard, Stephen, eds. (2020). The Impact of the Market on Character Formation, Ethical Education, and the Communication of Values in Late Modern Pluralistic Societies. Leipzig: Evangelische Verlagsanstalt / Wipf & Stock. ISBN 978-3-374-06406-9.
- ———; Witte, John, eds. (2021). The Impact of the Law on Character Formation, Ethical Education, and the Communication of Values in Late Modern Pluralistic Societies. Leipzig: Evangelische Verlagsanstalt / Wipf & Stock. ISBN 978-3-374-06801-2.
- ———; Schweiker, William; Witte, John; Pickard, Stephen, eds. (2021). The Impact of Academic Research on Character Formation, Ethical Education, and the Communication of Values in Late Modern Pluralistic Societies. Leipzig: Evangelische Verlagsanstalt / Wipf & Stock. ISBN 978-3-374-06803-6.
- ———; Witte, John; Pickard, Stephen, eds. (2022). The Impact of the Family on Character Formation, Ethical Education, and the Communication of Values in Late Modern Pluralistic Societies. Leipzig: Evangelische Verlagsanstalt / Wipf & Stock. ISBN 978-3-374-07052-7.
- ———; Pickard, Stephen; Witte, John, eds. (2022). The Impact of Education on Character Formation, Ethical Education, and the Communication of Values in Late Modern Pluralistic Societies. Leipzig: Evangelische Verlagsanstalt / Wipf & Stock. ISBN 978-3-374-06801-2.
- ———; von Hagen, Jürgen; Witte, John; Pickard, Stephen, eds. (2022). The Impact of the Media on Character Formation, Ethical Education, and the Communication of Values in Late Modern Pluralistic Societies. Leipzig: Evangelische Verlagsanstalt / Wipf and Stock. ISBN 978-3-374-07189-0.
- ———; Pickard, Stephen; Witte, John, eds. (2022). The Impact of the Military on Character Formation, Ethical Education, and the Communication of Values in Late Modern Pluralistic Societies. Leipzig: Evangelische Verlagsanstalt / Wipf and Stock. ISBN 978-3-374-07187-6.
- ———; Winkler, Eva; Witte, John; Pickard, Stephen, eds. (2023). The Impact of Health Care on Character Formation, Ethical Education, and the Communication of Values in Late Modern Pluralistic Societies. Leipzig: Evangelische Verlagsanstalt / Wipf and Stock. ISBN 978-3-374-07304-7.
- ———; Naudé, Piet; Witte, John, eds. (2023). The Impact of Political Economy on Character Formation, Ethical Education, and the Communication of Values in Late Modern Pluralistic Societies. Leipzig: Evangelische Verlagsanstalt / Wipf and Stock. ISBN 978-3-374-07306-1.
