= Tom Greggs =

British systematic theologian

- Born: Thomas William Greggs; 1980 (age 45–46); Liverpool, England

Academic background
- Education: Christ Church, Oxford; Jesus College, Cambridge
- Thesis: Restoring particularity: The economic dynamics of Spirit and Son, with special reference to the theologies of Origen and Karl Barth (2007)
- Doctoral advisor: David F. Ford

Academic work
- Discipline: Theology
- Sub-discipline: Systematic theology, ecclesiology, soteriology, Methodist theology, theology of religions
- Institutions: Center of Theological Inquiry; University of Aberdeen; University of Chester; University of Cambridge
- Notable works: Barth, Origen, and Universal Salvation; A Dogmatic Ecclesiology; The Breadth of Salvation

Thomas William "Tom" Greggs DLitt, FRSE, FHEA (born 1980) is a British theologian whose work has focused on systematic theology, ecclesiology, evangelical theology, ecumenism, and Christian engagement with religious pluralism. Since 2025, he has served as Director of the Center of Theological Inquiry in Princeton, New Jersey. He previously held the Marischal Chair of Divinity at the University of Aberdeen and served as Head of Divinity.

Greggs has written on ecclesiology, salvation, Karl Barth, Dietrich Bonhoeffer, Methodist theology, and interreligious engagement. His published books include A Dogmatic Ecclesiology, The Breadth of Salvation, The Church in a World of Religions, and Barth and Bonhoeffer as Contributors to a Post-Liberal Ecclesiology.

== Early life and education ==
Greggs was born in Liverpool, England, and was educated at Liverpool Blue Coat School. He studied theology at Christ Church, Oxford, as an Open Scholar, graduating with first-class honours and receiving the Denyer and Johnson Prize.

Greggs subsequently completed a PGCE in secondary religious studies through the University of Liverpool before undertaking doctoral studies in systematic theology at Jesus College, Cambridge. His doctorate, completed in 2007 under the supervision of David F. Ford, examined the economic dynamics of Spirit and Son with particular reference to the theologies of Origen and Karl Barth. The dissertation formed the basis of his 2009 book Barth, Origen, and Universal Salvation: Restoring Particularity.

In 2022, the University of Aberdeen awarded Greggs the higher doctorate of Doctor of Letters for research described as making "an original and substantial contribution to humane learning".

== Academic career ==
Following graduation from Oxford, Greggs taught religion and philosophy at Manchester Grammar School from 2002 to 2004. He subsequently taught historical and systematic theology at the University of Cambridge while pursuing his doctoral studies.

In 2007, Greggs joined the University of Chester, initially as Senior Lecturer in Christian Theology and subsequently as Professor of Systematic Theology. He became the youngest person appointed to a full professorship by the University of Chester.

In 2011, Greggs moved to the University of Aberdeen as Professor of Historical and Doctrinal Theology. He subsequently held the Marischal Chair of Divinity, a chair founded in 1616, and served as Head of Divinity from 2018 to 2022.

As Head of Divinity, Greggs oversaw the department during the period in which Aberdeen's Theology and Religious Studies submission was ranked first in the United Kingdom for research in the qualitative, peer-reviewed Research Excellence Framework.

In 2025, Greggs became Director of the Center of Theological Inquiry in Princeton, New Jersey. As Director, he combines executive leadership with responsibility for the centre's academic and research direction.

Greggs has held visiting positions at the University of Virginia and St John's College, Durham. He has also served as Honorary Professor of Divinity at the University of Aberdeen and Honorary Professor of Systematic Theology at St Mellitus College, London.

== Research ==
Greggs's scholarship has focused on Christian doctrine outside the conditions of Christendom, ecclesiology, theology of religions, ecumenism, salvation, and the reception of Karl Barth and Dietrich Bonhoeffer. His work explores the relationship between academic theology, the life of the church, and theology's contribution to wider society.

A significant strand of his work has been the development of a multivolume dogmatic theology of the church. The first volume, A Dogmatic Ecclesiology: The Priestly Catholicity of the Church, was published by Baker Academic in 2019. The book was subsequently the subject of a scholarly book forum in the International Journal of Systematic Theology.

Greggs's publications have also addressed Methodist and evangelical theology, scriptural reasoning, interfaith dialogue, universal salvation, theological method, ecumenism, and Christian hope.

Greggs served on the United Kingdom's Research Excellence Framework panel for Theology and Religious Studies.

== Ecclesiastical and public engagement ==
Greggs is an accredited local preacher in the Methodist Church of Great Britain and has been active in preaching, theological formation, ecumenism, and interreligious engagement. He has served on the Faith and Order Committee of the Methodist Church and as a Methodist representative on the Faith and Order Commission of the World Council of Churches.

Greggs chaired a Faith and Order subgroup concerned with Christian witness and religious pluralism.

From 2013 to 2017, Greggs served as a theological adviser to the Archbishop of Canterbury.

Greggs has contributed to public theological discussion through lectures, conferences, educational initiatives, and media appearances. He has appeared on BBC Radio 4 programmes including In Our Time and Beyond Belief.

== Honours and recognition ==
Greggs was elected a Fellow of the Royal Society of Edinburgh in 2019. He was previously a founding member of the Royal Society of Edinburgh's Young Academy of Scotland.

He is a Fellow of the Higher Education Academy and has received University of Aberdeen awards for postgraduate research supervision and for public engagement and research impact.

== Personal life ==
Greggs is married and has two daughters.

== Selected works ==
=== Authored books ===
- Greggs, Tom (2009). Barth, Origen, and Universal Salvation: Restoring Particularity. Oxford: Oxford University Press. ISBN 9780199560486.
- Greggs, Tom (2011). Theology Against Religion: Constructive Dialogues with Bonhoeffer and Barth. London: T&T Clark.
- Greggs, Tom (2019). A Dogmatic Ecclesiology, Volume 1: The Priestly Catholicity of the Church. Grand Rapids, Michigan: Baker Academic. ISBN 9780801097898.
- Greggs, Tom (2020). The Breadth of Salvation: Rediscovering the Fullness of God's Saving Work. Grand Rapids, Michigan: Baker Academic. ISBN 9781540961952.
- Greggs, Tom (2022). Barth and Bonhoeffer as Contributors to a Post-Liberal Ecclesiology: Essays of Hope for a Fallen and Complex World. London: T&T Clark.
- Greggs, Tom (2022). The Church in a World of Religions: Working Papers in Theology. London: T&T Clark.

=== Co-authored and edited books ===
- Greggs, Tom, ed. (2010). New Perspectives for Evangelical Theology: Engaging God, Scripture and the World. Abingdon: Routledge.
- Greggs, Tom; Muers, Rachel; Zahl, Simeon, eds. (2013). The Vocation of Theology Today: A Festschrift for David Ford. Eugene, Oregon: Cascade Books.
- Greggs, Tom; Dakake, Maria; Kepnes, Steven (2026). Scriptural Reasoning: Abrahamic Inter-Faith Practice. Wiley-Blackwell.
