= James I. McCord =

American theologian (1919–1990)

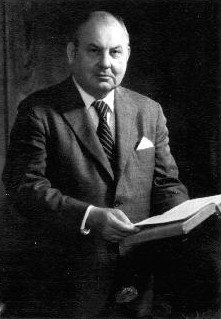
Image of James Iley McCord

James Iley McCord (November 24, 1919 – February 19, 1990) was an American religious figure who was president of Princeton Theological Seminary. He also won the 1986 Templeton Prize. Born in Rusk, Texas on November 24, 1919, McCord died from complications of Parkinson's disease at Princeton Medical Center, on February 19, 1990, at the age of 70.

== 150 Years of Princeton Theological Seminary ==
In 1962, as President of Princeton Theological Seminary, McCord hosted the Princeton Theological's 150-year anniversary festivities.
