= Daniel W. Hardy =

Anglican theologian

Daniel Wayne Hardy (November 9, 1930 - November 15, 2007) was an ordained Anglican priest. He taught theology at universities in the US and England.

== Early life ==
He was born as the second of four children to John and Barbara Hardy and raised in Queens, New York.

== His career ==
His first post was at Christ Episcopal Church, Greenwich, Connecticut where he worked with young people. He began by engaging with what mattered and was significant to them, and then trusting, discerning, and helping them to recognize the source and energy of life (God's Spirit) already at work within their lives and making deep connections with the truth of the Gospel. The group began to thrive in a short space of time. The curacy culminated in helping to design the new daughter church of St. Barnabas.

It was at this time that he met and married his wife, Perrin. They went on to have four children.

He returned to General Theological Seminary as a fellow and tutor for two years.

In 1960 the family moved to England and Hardy studied at Oxford University. At that time he found a type of theology which he believed was too influenced by positivist philosophy and rarely confident enough to explore the depths and wonders of God and God's ways with the world.

After completing his study at Oxford, he stayed in England and taught at the University of Birmingham for 21 years. During this time he also worked on a theology that might give dedicated attention both to the intensity of God and to the way the world is, especially as described, interpreted, and explained by theologians, philosophers, and scientists since the sixteenth century. For several hours each week, he maintained intensive conversations with the colleague who later became his son-in-law, David F. Ford.

In 1986 he became Van Mildert Professor of Divinity in Durham University He also became a canon in Durham Cathedral leading to a combination of daily worship and academic work. During those years, he dedicated himself to a multifaceted involvement in ecclesiology that remained at the forefront of his thinking.

In 1987 he supervised the production of the Church of England’s ‘’Education for the Church’s Ministry’’ paper which released CoE institutions of theological learning from central control.

Hardy was also involved in the creation of the Simon of Cyrene Theological Institute.

In 1990, he returned to the US and became Director of the Princeton Center of Theological Inquiry for five years. Much of his time there was spent working closely with individual members from many disciplines, countries and faiths. Hardy, Ochs and David F. Ford (representing the University of Cambridge) spent much time working together with others developing the practice of Scriptural Reasoning, the shared study of scriptures by Jews, Christians, and Muslims.

Hardy returned to England in 1995, to an active retirement based in the Faculty of Divinity at the University of Cambridge. His involvement in the 1998 Lambeth Conferences and participation in some of the Primates' meetings made him look for a reconciliatory imagination and practice centered on scripture and nurturing a deeper and richer sociality, touching healingly the depths of each person.

In October 2007, he received an honorary doctorate recognizing him for his life work from the General Theological Seminary.

== His contributions ==
Peter Ochs described Hardy as “a pastor's pastor - seeing light in the other, light as attractiveness in and with the other. He is a pastor of others within the Eucharist; within the Anglican Communion, a pastor on behalf of Abrahamic communions and to human communities more generally.... all of whom he sees lit up by (the) divine attractiveness itself.... the great cosmic and ecclesial and divine communion of lights which draws him to it and us and draws us to be near him.”

His vocation attempted to engage more deeply with life in all its particularity, tracing the Bible's prophetic wisdom to its source in the divine intensity of God’s love and working to share that love through the church to the whole world, particularly in the Eucharist: light and love together.

Much of his inspiration for his work came from the theologian and poet, Samuel Taylor Coleridge. He recognized that Coleridge engaged deeply with God and most aspects of God's creation - intellectually, imaginatively, practically, spiritually, emotionally, and through much personal suffering. Above all Coleridge responded in all those ways to the attraction of the divine. He saw the Holy Spirit endlessly present, active, and innovative, lifting the world from within, raising it into its future - giving humankind immense in God and God's future, drawing people towards God with divine love into new and unimaginable levels of life.

== Death ==
On November 15, 2007, Hardy died from a glioblastoma.

== Works ==
- Wording a Radiance: Parting Conversations on God and the Church (2011)
- Living in Praise: Worshipping and Knowing God (with David F. Ford) (Nov. 2005). London: Darton Longman & Todd; Grand Rapids: Baker Academic.
- God's Ways With the World (Academic Paperback) (Mar. 2005)
- Finding the Church: The Dynamic Truth of Anglicanism (Feb. 2002). London: SCM Press.
- God's Ways With the World: Thinking and Practicing Christian Faith (Sep. 1996). Edinburgh: T & T Clark.
- Essentials of Christian Community (1996)
- The Weight of Glory (1991)
- On Being the Church: Essays on the Christian Community (with Colin Gunton) (Feb. 1989). Edinburgh: T & T Clark.
- Praising and Knowing God by Daniel W. Hardy (with David F. Ford) (May 1985)
- Jubilate: Theology in Praise (with David F. Ford) (Paperback - Sep 1984)
