= Modern Theology (journal) =

- Discipline: Theology
- Language: English
- Edited by: Jim Fodor; Bill Cavanaugh

Publication details
- History: 1984–present
- Publisher: Wiley
- Frequency: Quarterly

Standard abbreviations
- ISO 4: Mod. Theol.

Indexing
- ISSN: 0266-7177 (print); 1468-0025 (web)
- OCLC no.: 11538889

Links
- Journal homepage; Online access

Modern Theology is a peer-reviewed academic journal published by Wiley. It publishes articles, review articles, and book reviews in the area of theology, with an ecumenical editorial policy.

== Abstracting and indexing ==
The journal is abstracted and indexed in ATLA Religion Database, EBSCO databases, Philosopher's Index, ProQuest databases, Religious & Theological Abstracts, and Scopus.

The editors-in-chief are Jim Fodor (St. Bonaventure University) and William T. Cavanaugh (DePaul University).
