= Erwin Fahlbusch =

German theologian and academic (1926-2007)

- Born: 26 May 1926; Frankfurt am Main, Germany
- Died: 10 August 2007 (aged 81); Montouliers, France

Academic work
- Discipline: theology
- Sub-discipline: systematic theology
- Institutions: Konfessionskundliches Institut; University of Frankfurt

Erwin Fahlbusch (born 26 May 1926 in Frankfurt am Main; died 10 August 2007 in Montouliers, France) was a research consultant at Konfessionskundliches Institut in Bensheim and was an honorary professor of systematic theology in the Faculty of Evangelical Theology at the University of Frankfurt for many years.

== Life ==
Erwin Fahlbusch was born on 26 May 1926, the only child of Friedrich and Helma Fahlbusch in Frankfurt am Main. He was baptized Catholic there, went to the first holy communion and was also confirmed there. On 25 March 1940 he was confirmed by the Protestant parish priest because he also attended Protestant religious education.

From 1932 to 1942, he attended primary school in Frankfurt am Main and then middle school, which he graduated with a secondary school leaving certificate. He then began training as an engineer, but was unable to finish it since he was drafted into military service in May 1944. In September 1944, he was captured by the United States in Normandy, from which he returned to Frankfurt am Main in July 1946.

Fahlbusch says he experienced his inner calling as a theologian before he was called up for military service, but especially after his experiences in war and captivity. He began studying theology in the summer semester of 1947 as a guest student at the seminar of the Hamburg University of Applied Sciences and then took his matriculation examination in Frankfurt am Main before being able to study at the theological faculties of the universities of Mainz, Erlangen and Göttingen. He passed the first theological exam in September 1952 with the dissertation Die Lehre von der Revolution bei Friedrich Julius Stahl followed by his studies. The rapporteurs were professors Hans Joachim Iwand and Otto Weber. In addition to writing the dissertation, Fahlbusch worked as a repentant at the Göttingen Theological Abbey and later at the Faculty of Theology.

From 1953 to 1959, Fahlbusch also worked as editorial secretary for the first edition of the Evangelisches Kirchenlexikon, for which he also wrote several of his own contributions.

In May 1959 Fahlbusch went to Bocholt as a full-time religion teacher at primary, secondary and vocational schools and from March 1960 to the Westphalian diaspora community of Mesum as a synodal vicar. He passed his second theological exam on 25 March 1960 in Bielefeld and was ordained in Mesum in September 1960. On 29 April 1962 he took office as pastor in Bochum-Weitmar. In April 1964 he moved to the Denomination Institute in Bensheim, where he was responsible for the Catholica department until his retirement in 1991.

In addition to this work at the Denominational Institute, Erwin Fahlbusch was a lecturer at the Comenius Faculty in Prague, the Université catholique de Louvain in Belgium, at the University of Basel and at the Theological Faculties in Budapest and Debrecen (Hungary). From 1984 he was an honorary professor (at times also a C-4 professor) for systematic theology at the University of Frankfurt am Main.

Erwin Fahlbusch retired in May 1991; he held lectures at the University of Frankfurt am Main until the winter semester 1992/1993. He died on August 10, 2007, in Montouliers, Herault, France.

== Views ==
In the 1950s and 1960s, Erwin Fahlbusch was called a "baptismal impeller," since he considered that infant baptism, as was also practiced in the Evangelical Church, does not have a biblical basis, but that a person should only be baptized when you have exercised faith to have. As a pastor, however, he fulfilled parents' requests for their children to be baptized.

With regard to the church of the people, which includes the Protestant church, Erwin Fahlbusch believed that it was necessary to reform it. In particular, she did not give the pastor enough opportunities for theological work. Rather, a pastor in it is rather the "official of a powerful religious institution." His opinion, which deviated from the general vision of the church, led to discussions with the leaders of the Westphalia church, but also with the believers in his community in Bochum-Weitmar.

In his last works of 1998 and 2001, which have not yet been published, he called for a paradigm shift in theology. The starting point of theological work should no longer be a revealed truth, but rather the concrete daily situation, "what must contain salvation, redemption, liberation, and humanity."

== Honors ==
Erwin Fahlbusch was awarded an honorary doctorate in 1970 by the Reformed Theological Academy in Budapest.

== Some works ==
- Die Lehre von der Revolution bei Friedrich Julius Stahl (Dissertation an der Theologischen Fakultät der Universität Göttingen 8. Mai 1955). Göttingen. 1954.
- Kirchenkunde der Gegenwart. Kohlhammer, Stuttgart / Berlin / Köln / Mainz 1979, ISBN 3-17-001082-4.
- Einheit der Kirche – eine kritische Betrachtung des ökumenischen Dialogs. Zur Rezeption der Lima-Erklärung über Taufe, Eucharistie und Amt (= Theologische Existenz heute. Nr. 218). Kaiser, München 1983, ISBN 3-459-01520-9.
- Mitautor, Jan Milič Lochman, John S. Mbiti: Evangelisches Kirchenlexikon (EKL). Internationale theologische Enzyklopädie. 5 Bände. 3., neubearbeitete Auflage. Vandenhoeck & Ruprecht, Göttingen 1986, ISBN 3-525-50144-7 (englisch: The encyclopedia of Christianity, Grand Rapids, Michigan; auch als elektronische Ressource Directmedia Publishing Berlin 2004, ISBN 3-89853-498-7).
- Mitautor: Taschenlexikon Religion und Theologie. Vandenhoeck & Ruprecht, Göttingen, ISBN 3-525-50122-6 (4. Auflage, ohne Jahrgang, auch als Elektronische Ressource, Berlin 2002).
