= Moltmann =

Moltmann is a surname which can be found in Germany. Notable people with this surname include:

- Elisabeth Moltmann-Wendel (1926–2016), a German theologian
- Friederike Moltmann, a German linguist and philosopher
- Jürgen Moltmann (1926–2024), a German theologian
