= Ilse Härter =

German Lutheran theologian

Ilse Härter (12 January 1912 - 28 December 2012) was a centenarian German Lutheran theologian. On her thirty-first birthday, in 1943, she was one of the first two women to be ordained in Germany.

== Life ==
=== Provenance and early years ===
Ilse Härter was born in Asperden, a small village to the south of Kleve, and positioned within walking distance of the Dutch border. She was the second of her parents' three daughters. The family was not a particularly religious one, and Härter's career choice surprised her parents. She was asked about this later, and recalled a funeral ceremony for an aunt at which the celebrating minister had reassured those present that after three days the dead aunt would be resurrected. Intrigued, the child attempted to trigger a resurrection with a dead bird that she had found; but after being buried for three days the bird showed no sign of resurrection. She concluded that she would need to start with a living being, so she took her teddy bear, and waited till wash day. Persuading her mother to let her use the dirty water in which the clothes had been washed, she then thoroughly drowned the teddy bear in the dirty soapy water. She placed the "corpse" in a discarded cigar box, and gave the bear a dignified burial. Three days later she dug up the little grave, but there was no sign of the dead bear's condition having changed except that, since it was summer and he had been damp when buried, the body had acquired a garnish of mold. Clearly resurrection was no simple matter, but her determination to find out what it was all about was undiminished.

=== Education ===
Her parents had no sons, but they were determined - especially the girls' mother - that their three daughters should attended secondary school and have the opportunity to pass the schooling completion exam ("Abitur") which, despite her gender, would clear Ilse's path to university-level education. In 1931 Härter passed her Abitur at the "Freiherr von Stein Gymnasium" (secondary school) in Kleve. She moved on to study Evangelical Theology at the University of Göttingen later in 1931. Meanwhile, the country was facing growing economic and social challenges in the political backwash from the Great Depression: politics were becoming polarised and dangerously contaminated by populist nationalism.

=== Studying theology during the Nazi years ===
In January 1933 the Nazis took power and lost little time in transforming Germany into a one-party dictatorship. Ilse Härter was faced with a decision over whether or not to pursue her theological studies further, since she had absolutely no wish to become involved with the government backed German Christian movement. "This much had I learned during the first three semesters: this was about another bible and another God. I was also completely clear that I would not permit myself to be subjected to Nazi diktats on the role of women." On the advice of a fellow student she transferred to Königsberg in Prussia. "That meant I had decided to stick with Theology. In the colleges of Professors Julius Schniewind and Hans Iwand I was impressed by just how much the Bible could deliver guiding principles for the conflicts of those times.

Over the next few years Ilse Härter pursued her theological studies in various places. During 1935/36 she was a "visiting student" at the Ecclesiastical Wuppertal Academy (Kirchliche Hochschule Wuppertal - recently declared "illegal") and/or at one or other of its "alternative locations". In or soon after 1934, through the intervention of Schniewind, she joined the Confessing Church (Bekennende Kirche) which was a coming together of Protestant churches that rejected the idea of being merged into a single unified state-sponsored German Evangelical Church (Deutsche Evangelische Kirche). She passed her Level I Confessing Church Theology Exams in 1936 and the Level II Exams in 1939. Because of the so-called Himmler Ordinance of 20 June 1938 she was not able to undertake equivalent exams that would have been recognised by the state authorities. Like other candidates for the exams promoted by the Confessing Church, she came to the attention of the Gestapo, but she was treated to only one interrogation session (at which she was threatened with court action) even though she refused to take the oath of loyalty to Hitler or to compile an Aryan certificate in respect of her genealogical provenance which would have satisfied the official requirement to demonstrate non-Jewish ancestry. Meanwhile, during 1937-1939 she served her two years as "Vikarin" (a candidate for ordained pastoral ministry) in Wuppertal-Elberfeld. The work involved a large number of home visits which she relished. In 1939 she would have been due for ordination into the ministry, but even in the Confessing Church ordination was at this point restricted to male candidates. Nevertheless, in March 1939 the church authorities arranged for her to receive a "consecration without altar service" ("Einsegnung ...Kein Dienst am Altar") which gave rise to her (subsequently much requoted) rebuke, "Tell the presbytery that I shall not be present for my own consecration" ("Sagen Sie dem Presbyterium: Zu meiner Einsegnung werde ich nicht anwesend sein.").

Härter did indeed boycott "her own consecration", which represented a defiant rejection of the Confessing Church's "conservative" view of women. However, at 8 o'clock the next morning she appeared without warning at the door of the church's training officer Johannes Schlingensiepen, and demanded ordination. After her demand was refused she "turned poacher" as she later termed it, carrying out pastoral duties for the next two years in Elberfeld without any fixed salary. The outbreak of war in September 1939 led to a progressively more acute shortage of male pastors over the next few years as the men were conscripted into the army, so that despite her "unofficial" status there was no shortage of work. After 1941 she moved around more. One destination was Brandenburg where she established what sources term an "emergency church community" of the Confessing Church, but the Wannsee congregation dispensed with her services in connection with her refusal to swear loyalty to Hitler. She undertook pastoral stints in various other places, at one point standing in for an arrested church Superintendent and taking the place of at least two parish priests conscripted for military service. Under the regulatory provisions that governed the Confessing Church, none of this would have been possible were it not for the emergency conditions created by the war.

=== Ordination ===
On 12 January 1943 Ilse Härter was one of two women ordained as ministers in the Confessing Church. The other ordinand was Hannelotte Reiffen. The ordination was conducted, in the end, at Sachsenhausen, within sight of the searchlight beams of the eponymous concentration camp. The Confessing Church of the Old Prussian Union had given their backing to a "restricted ordination" to a "special women's office". There were also quibbles from the senior Confessing Churchman Otto Dibelius that the two women should not be permitted to wear full priestly garb, and the women let it be known that they intended to turn up for the ceremony in (evidently even more unsuitable in the eyes of some) brightly coloured red and green dresses to celebrate their admission to the ministry. In the end Kurt Scharf, pastor in Sachsenhausen and praeses of the Brandenburg provincial Synod of the Confessing Church, a senior position within the convoluted hierarchy of the war-time Confessing Church, performed the full consecration at his church in Sachsenhausen, while the women wore the full ministerial robes. Härter and Reiffen were the first - and for some time the only - women to receive full ordination into the ministry of the Evangelical Church. Nevertheless, in the Rhineland region, where "conservatives" called the shots, the women were still required, formally, to restrict their ministry to women, young people and children.

=== Postwar years ===
Ilse Härter suffered serious illness around the end of the war, which came, formally, in May 1945. She recovered and in 1946 returned west to the Evangelical Church in the Rhineland, thereby relocating from what had now become the Soviet occupation zone to the British occupation zone (after May 1949 the Federal Republic of Germany / West Germany) . She was engaged with the Vocational Academy ("Berufsschule") in Leverkusen from 1952, and then moved on to church vocational academy work and the Synod Youth Ministry Office in Wuppertal. By the time she retired in 1972 she had also been a co-founder of the supra-synodical working group on the further expansion of religious instruction at the vocational academies. In her own words, she continued to relish the opportunities "...to keep on building new life-experiences with young people" ("...mit den jungen Leuten noch einmal neue Lebenserfahrungen zu machen").

That quote was repeated by the theologian-scholar Christine Globig in a speech on 31 January 2006. The occasion was a ceremony at which Ilse Härter was awarded an honorary doctorate by the Ecclesiastical Wuppertal Academy (Kirchliche Hochschule Wuppertal). Globig also paid heartfelt tribute to Härter's "co-operative working approach" (den "kooperativen Arbeitsstil“") and her committed leadership and training activities in respect of the Old Prussian Union church in Elberfeld. She also participated in numerous committees, not leastly in the "New ways to worship God" ("Gottesdienst in neuer Gestalt") Committee in the Rhineland.
