= Erich Schaeder =

German Protestant theologian (1861–1936)

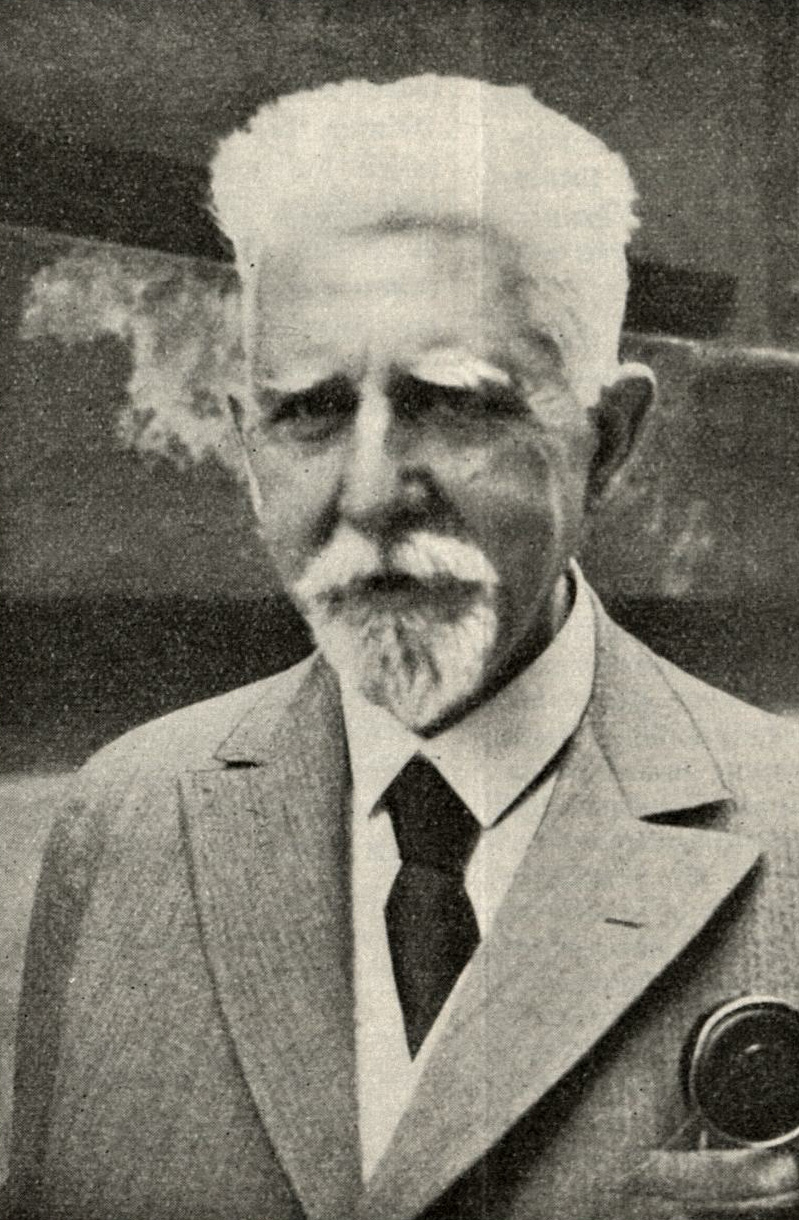
- Wingolfsnachrichten, 1928
- Born: 22 December 1861; Clausthal, Kingdom of Hanover (now Germany)
- Died: 18 February 1936 (aged 74); Berlin, Germany
- Occupation: Protestant theologian

Erich Schaeder (22 December 1861 – 18 February 1936) was a German Protestant theologian.

He studied theology at the universities of Berlin and Greifswald, where in 1891 he qualified as a lecturer. In 1894 he became an associate professor of theology at the University of Königsberg, and later on, served as a full professor at the universities of Kiel (from 1899) and Breslau (from 1918).

Schaeder was a leading advocate of theocentric theology. Through his criticism of 19th-century theological anthropocentrism, he was one of the founders of dialectical theology.

== Selected works ==
- Die Bedeutung des lebendigen Christus fur die Rechtfertigung nach Paulus, 1891 – The importance of the living Christ for justification to Paul the Apostle.
- Die Christologie der Bekenntnisse und die moderne Theologie : zwei Vorträge (with Adolf Schlatter; 1905) – The Christology of confessions and modern theology: two lectures.
- Das Evangelium Jesu und das Evangelium von Jesus, 1906 – Jesus the Evangelist and the Gospel of Jesus.
- Der Moderne Mensch und die Kirche, 1907 – Modern man and the church.
- Natur und Christentum : vier Vorträge (with Karl Bornhäuser, Wilhelm Lütgert and Georg Lasson; 1907) – Nature and Christianity: four lectures.
- Schriftglaube und Heilsgewissheit : Vorlesungen, 1908 – Scripture faith and assurance of salvation: lectures.
- Theologie und geschichte, 1909 – Theology and history.
- Theozentrische Theologie : eine Untersuchung zur dogmatische Prinzipienlehre (2 volumes, 1909–14) – Theocentric theology: an investigation into the dogmatic doctrine of principles.
