= Wilhelm Lütgert =

German pastor and theologian (1867–1938)

Wilhelm Lütgert (9 April 1867 in Heiligengrabe – 21 February 1938 in Berlin) was a German Protestant theologian.

He studied theology at the University of Greifswald as a pupil of Hermann Cremer, then furthered his education in Berlin, where he attended lectures given by Adolf von Harnack. In 1892 he obtained his habilitation at Greifswald, and three years later, became an associate professor of New Testament exegesis. In 1902 he succeeded Willibald Beyschlag as professor of New Testament exegesis at the University of Halle, where in 1912 he replaced Martin Kähler as chair of systematic theology. In 1917/18 he served as university rector. From 1929 onward, he was a professor of systematic theology at Friedrich-Wilhelms-Universität in Berlin.

With Hermann Cremer, Adolf Schlatter and others, he was a prominent member of the so-called Greifswalder Schule of theology. He was in disagreement with the dialectical theology of his era, and was equally opposed to the Deutsche Christen Movement. He viewed the Confessing Church favorably, but never joined as a member.

== Selected works ==
- Die Methode des dogmatischen Beweises in ihrer Entwicklung unter dem Einfluss Schleiermachers, 1892 – The method of dogmatic proof in its development under the influence of Friedrich Schleiermacher.
- Das Reich Gottes nach dem synoptischen Evangelien : eine Untersuchung zur neutestamentlichen Theologie, 1895 – The Kingdom of God according to the Synoptic Gospels.
- Die johanneische Christologie, 1899 – Johannine Christianity.
- Gottes Sohn und Gottes Geist; Vorträge zur Christologie und zur Lehre vom Geiste Gottes, 1905 – The Son of God and the spirit of God; Lectures on Christology and the teaching of the spirit of God.
- Die Liebe im Neuen Testament. Ein Beitrag zur Geschichte des Urchristentums, 1905 – Love in the New Testament. A contribution to the history of Early Christianity.
- Freiheitspredigt und Schwarmgeister in Korinth : ein Beitrag zur Charakteristik der Christuspartei, 1908.
- Die Religion des deutschen Idealismus und ihr Ende (4 volumes, 1923–30) – The religion of German idealism and its outcome.
