= Heinz Brunotte =

German Lutheran theologian (1896–1984)

Arnold August Heinz Brunotte (11 June 1896, Hanover – 2 February 1984, Hanover) was a German Lutheran theologian. From 1949 to 1965, Brunotte was President of the Church Chancellery of the Evangelical Church in Germany (today: Deutscher Evangelischer Kirchenbund, DEK).

== Career ==
Heinz Brunotte attended the Leibniz Reform Gymnasium in Hanover. From 1919 to 1922, Brunotte studied Protestant theology at the Universities of Marburg, Tübingen, and Göttingen. This was followed by two years of study at the Loccum preacher seminar. This was followed by work as a pastor in Loccum. In autumn 1926 he was one of the founders of the Deins conference. From it emerged in 1929 the Hanoverian Young Evangelical Conference, an amalgamation of predominantly younger theologians of the Hanoverian regional church, which saw itself as an alternative to the existing synodal groups. In 1927 Heinz Brunotte became a pastor in Hoyershausen, Alfeld/Leine district. In 1936 he was appointed to the church chancellery of the EKD, where he served as senior consistory until 1946. In 1946, Heinz Brunotte became the regional church councilor and a member of the regional church office in Hanover. On 1 April 1949, the EKD Council elected him President of the EKD Church Chancellery; until 1963, he was also President of the VELKD Church Office. In 1965 he left office. In the 1950s he published the Evangelisches Kirchenlexikon together with Otto Weber.

== Critical appraisal ==
In 2010 a biography by Jens Gundlach, with the title Heinz Brunotte - Adaptation of the Gospel to the Nazi dictatorship, was published, in which, in addition to Brunotte's appreciation, his involvement in the Nazi regime is examined.

== Literature ==
- Jens Gundlach (2010). Heinz Brunotte – Anpassung des Evangeliums an die NS-Diktatur. Hannover: Lutherisches Verlagshaus (LVH).
