= Julius Schniewind =

- Born: Julius Daniel Schniewind; 28 May 1883; Elberfeld (Wuppertal), Rhine province, Germany
- Died: 7 September 1948 (aged 65); Halle, Soviet occupation zone (formerly Germany)
- Education: Bonn; Halle; Berlin; Marburg
- Occupation: Theologian
- Known for: his leadership role in the anti-government Confessing Church
- Spouse: Anna Alice Wanda Eveline Countess of Keyserling (1884-1955)
- Children: Julius Burchard Schniewind (1920-1943); Paul Werner Konrad Schniewind (1923-2011)
- Parent: Julius Schniewind (1847-1902)

Julius Schniewind (28 May 1883 - 7 September 1948) was a German evangelical (Lutheran) theologian. He came to prominence in the 1930s as a leader of the Confessing Church ("Bekennende Kirche"), which can be seen as a movement within German Protestantism that arose during the Nazi years in opposition to government-sponsored efforts to unify all Protestant churches into a single pro-Nazi Protestant Reich Church.

== Life ==
=== Provenance and early years ===
Julius Daniel Schniewind was born in Elberfeld, a town in the Ruhr region which had emerged during the nineteenth century as a major centre for the textiles industry, and which has subsequently been subsumed into Wuppertal. His father, also called Julius Schniewind (1847-1902) worked in the silk business and was a partner in the Elbersfeld-based firm "H. E. Schniewind". His grandfather, Heinrich Ernst Schniewind (1813-1895), had also been a partner in the family firm, and a prominent member of the local business community. His mother, born Emmi Elisabeth Burchard (1854–1924), was from Hamburg, a daughter of a banker originally from Bremen called Friedrich Wilhelm Burchard (1824–92). His childhood was shaped by a confident spirit of religious piety within the family. He attended the Wilhelm Dörpfeld Gymnasium ("grammar school") in Elberfeld and then moved on to study Lutheran Theology at Bonn, Halle, Berlin und Marburg between 1901 and 1906. His tutors included Paul Feine (1859-1933), Karl Heim (1874-1958) and Friedrich Loofs (1858-1928). He also became, according to at least one major source, the most significant of the students of Martin Kähler (1835-1912).

In 1910 he received his Licentiate (higher degree) at Halle for a piece of work on the writings and preaching of Paul the Apostle ("Die Begriffe Wort und Evangelium bei Paulus"). He remained at Halle, teaching New Testament studies, till 1914. That year he received his habilitation (degree) for a piece of work on parallel pericopes for Luke and John ("Die Parallelperikopen bei Lukas und Johannes"). His academic progress was interrupted during at least a part of the First World War, when Schniewind became a volunteer field chaplain. He was awarded the Iron Cross 2nd Class (Eisernes Kreuz 2. Klasse).

=== Marriage and family ===
Julius Schniewind married Anna Alice Wanda Eveline Countess of Keyserling (1884-1955) at Elberfeld on 7 May 1919. His bride came from Courland. The marriage was followed by the births of the couple's two sons.

=== Academic progression ===
In 1919 Schniewind was appointed to a provisional extraordinary professorship which in 1921 became a regular extraordinary professorship with a full teaching contract covering New Testament studies, Patristic Philology and Palaeography. The university awarded him a doctorate in theology in 1925. The next year he was appointed to the teaching chair in New Testament studies.

He moved in 1927 when he received a full professorship in New Testament studies at the University of Greifswald in the extreme north of the country. Two years later he moved again, this time accepting an offer from the University of Königsberg where he was in regular (and sometimes disputatious) contact with a younger generation of notable theologians such as Günther Bornkamm, Hans Iwand and Martin Noth.

=== Nazi years ===
In 1933 the Nazis took power, following several years during which politics had become progressively more polarised and then gridlocked. The new government lost no time in transforming Germany into a one-party dictatorship. In April 1933 leading protestant churchmen were persuaded to draft a new constitution for the "German Evangelical Church", which was part of a government plan for a state controlled protestant church. The idea was not one that sat comfortably with German tradition, and many protestant theologians responded by creating the Confessing Church ("Bekennende Kirche") movement, Actively backed by Bornkamm and Iwand, Schniewind took a lead in the struggle to establish the Confessing Church in East Prussia. They managed to involve the Bahnauer Fraternity. The Theology faculty at Königsberg became a power house for theological training on behalf of the Confessing Church. Schniewind joined the Pfarrernotbund (loosely "Emergency League of Pastors").

As a result of his activities involving the Confessing Church and his openly hostile attitude to the Nazi regime, in 1935 Schniewind was expelled from the University of Königsberg. He had made a public attack on the East Prussian Gauleiter, Erich Koch. He was sent to Kiel where, as before, he engaged actively with the Confessing Church. Meanwhile relations between the Confessing church and the more mainstream regional protestant churches had broken down. Professors involved with the Confessing Church had been forbidden from setting exams for theology students since February 1935. Schniewind continued to profess his support for the Confessing Church and refused to set exams on behalf of the regional churches. In 1936, because of his continuing refusal to comply with the requirements of the authorities in Kiel, he was sent away after a few months. He accepted an invitation to return to Halle. He nevertheless persisted with his open commitment to the Confessing Church. Along with Ernst Wolf he became a leader of the student religious community.

In March 1937 Schniewind was removed from his university post and early in 1938 the authorities launched a criminal investigation case into his involvement with the Confessing Church. He was obliged to take an 80% salary cut. Many sources assume or imply that he remained deprived of his professorship till war ended in May 1945, but recent investigation of personnel records retained in the archives at the University of Halle has indicated that Schniewind's professorship was quietly restored in some form later in 1938. There is no report of the criminal case having reached the stage of a prosecution. According to one source, alongside his lecturing activities on behalf of the Confessing Church, he was able to continue "mentoring his students privately". After 1939 he combined his activities at the university with work as a military-hospital chaplain.

=== Final years ===
As the war ended, the western two thirds of Germany was divided into zones of military occupation. The central portion, including Halle, was now administered as the Soviet occupation zone. The Ruhr region, where he had been born and lived as a young man became part of the British occupation zone. Schniewind received invitations to take up university appointments from Münster, Mainz and Berlin, but he turned them down. If his employment status at the University of Halle had been unclear before 1945, it now became a matter of public record, as he was restored to a full professorship. As a lecturer at the university and church provost in the Halle-Merseburg region he played a decisive role in a revival of public Christian awareness and the life of the church in Halle and in the Ecclesiastical Province of Saxony more widely.

Julius Schniewind died in Halle aged 65.

== Theology ==
Schniewind is regarded as the most important student of Martin Kähler (1835-1912). He was also influenced by Hermann Cremer, Adolf Schlatter and Søren Kierkegaard. He understood bible theology as the Word of God, deeply rooted in the Old Testament. In that respect he decisively stood apart from the ranks of the liberal theologians from Ferdinand Christian Baur to Adolf von Harnack. Schniewind's programme of "spiritual renewal" created a happy unity out of the frequently problematic relationship between scriptural belief and historical-critical biblical exegesis.

At the same time, his first interest was in the New Testament and in his pastoral duties. ("Others write books. I must be there for my students.") Recognition of the value of religious scholarship and form criticism never prevented Schniewind from stressing in his elaboration of the Words of Christ the "signs of the times". In that respect he applied a pauline interpretation of National Socialism as nothing less than the Wrath of God. With regard to the state's attempts to control the church, he would have endorsed Dietrich Bonhoeffer's judgement that Protestantism without the Confessing Church would amount to a denial of the Truth of the Gospel. During the Nazi years Julius Schniewind exercised a huge influence over his students. He uncompromisingly rejected National Socialist ideology, and sought to combine subjective religious experience with the objectivity of biblical witness.
