= Schniewind =

Schniewind is a surname. Notable people with the surname include:

- Julius Schniewind (1883–1948), German theologian
- Otto Schniewind (1887–1964), German admiral
