= Evangelisches Kirchenlexikon =

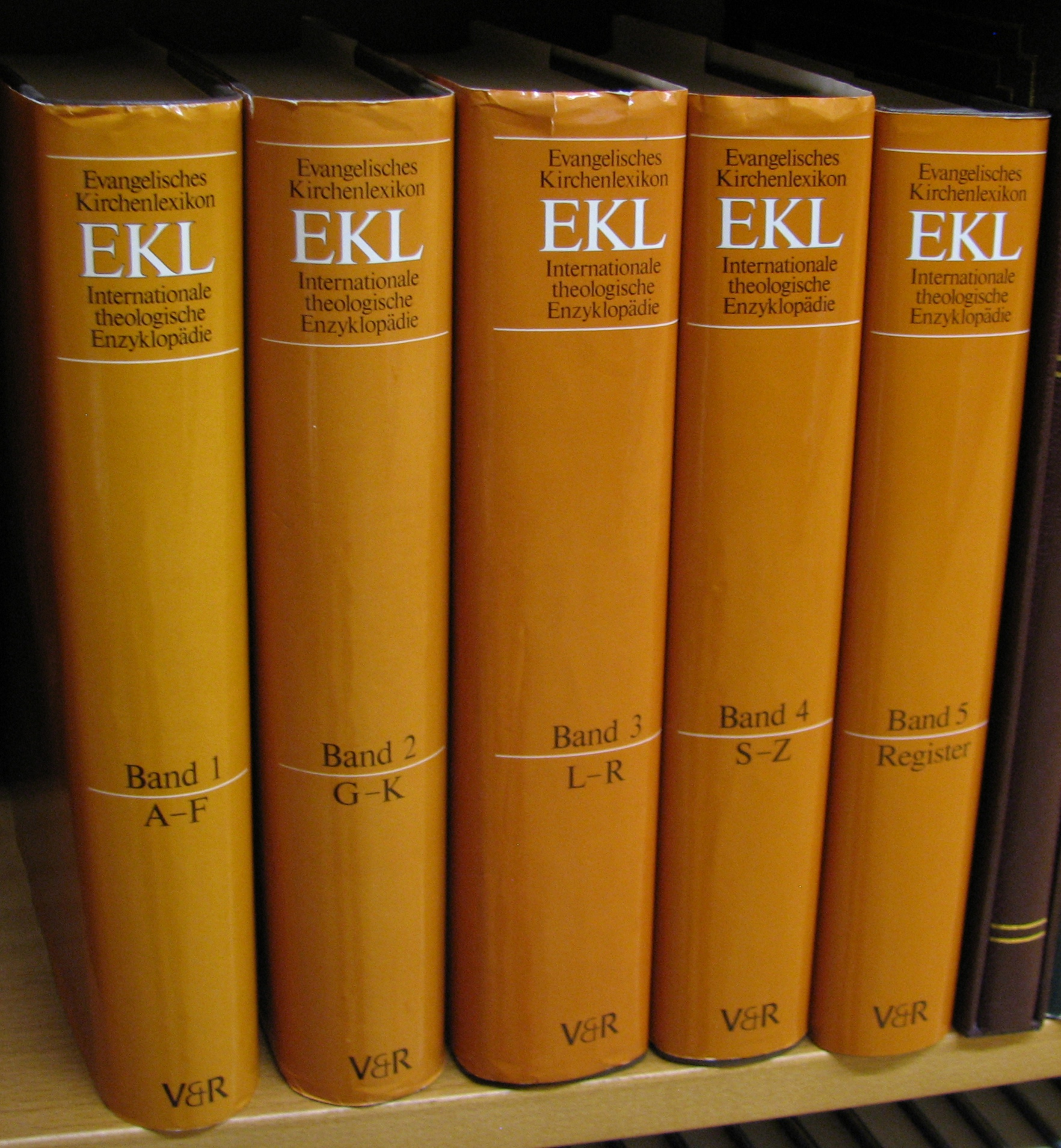
- EKL, 3. Edition
- Author: Erwin Fahlbusch, Heinz Brunotte (editor), Otto Weber (editor)
- Language: German (original); English (The Encyclopedia of Christianity)
- Subject: Christianity
- Publisher: Vandenhoeck & Ruprecht, William B. Eerdmans Publishing Company, Brill Publishers
- Website: https://referenceworks.brillonline.com/browse/encyclopedia-of-christianity

The Evangelische Kirchenlexikon (EKL) is a theological lexicon published by Vandenhoeck & Ruprecht, Göttingen. The first edition appeared in three volumes from 1955–1959, and a register volume followed in 1961. The second edition was an unchanged reprint published in 1962. The editors were Heinz Brunotte and Otto Weber. Erwin Fahlbusch was responsible for the publication of the third, revised edition from 1986–1997 in collaboration with numerous specialist scholars.

== Editions and volumes ==
The most recent edition is the third edition. Sequence of the individual volumes of the third edition:

- Volume 1: A–F. 1986, ISBN 3-525-50128-5.
- Volume 2: G–K. 1989, ISBN 3-525-50132-3.
- Volume 3: L–R. 1992, ISBN 3-525-50137-4.
- Volume 4: S–Z. 1996, ISBN 3-525-50141-2.
- Volume 5: Register. 1997, ISBN 3-525-50142-0.

The work was also published in digital form by the Wissenschaftliche Buchgesellschaft in 2003.

The following also appeared as a single publication:

- Martin Greschat: Personenlexikon Religion und Theologie [PRT] (= Uni-Taschenbücher. 2063). Vandenhoeck & Ruprecht, Göttingen 1998, ISBN 3-8252-2063-X.

== The Encyclopedia of Christianity ==
The third revised edition of Evangelisches Kirchenlexikon was translated into English language in a five-volume work called The Encyclopedia of Christianity. The work presents both the history and the current situation of the Christian faith today and throughout Christian history. These works were published by William B. Eerdmans Publishing Company and by Brill Publishers.

Several scholars have worked on it from many countries and cultural backgrounds, like Geoffrey W. Bromiley (English Language Editor), John Mbiti, Erwin Fahlbusch, Jaroslav Jan Pelikan, Jan Milic Lochman and Lukas Vischer, David B. Barrett (Statistical Editor). These volumes were published from 1998 to 2008, and an online version is available on Brill's website.

== Honors ==
The Encyclopedia of Christianity Vol. 3 was nominated Book of the month in 2005 by the British academic journal The Expository Times. Rudolph W. Heinze states that "meticulous cross-referencing and up-to-date bibliographies are another positive feature of an encyclopedia which should become a standard reference work replacing classic works such as the New Shaff Herzog encyclopedia and its 1955 extension, the Twentieth-century encyclopedia of religious knowledge. J. Scott Horrell praised the work, but thought that too few non-German authors were included, especially on topics such as Eastern Orthodoxy that would be improved by authors from countries where Orthodoxy predominates.

== See also ==
- List of encyclopedias by branch of knowledge#Christianity
