= Friederike Moltmann =

German linguist and philosopher

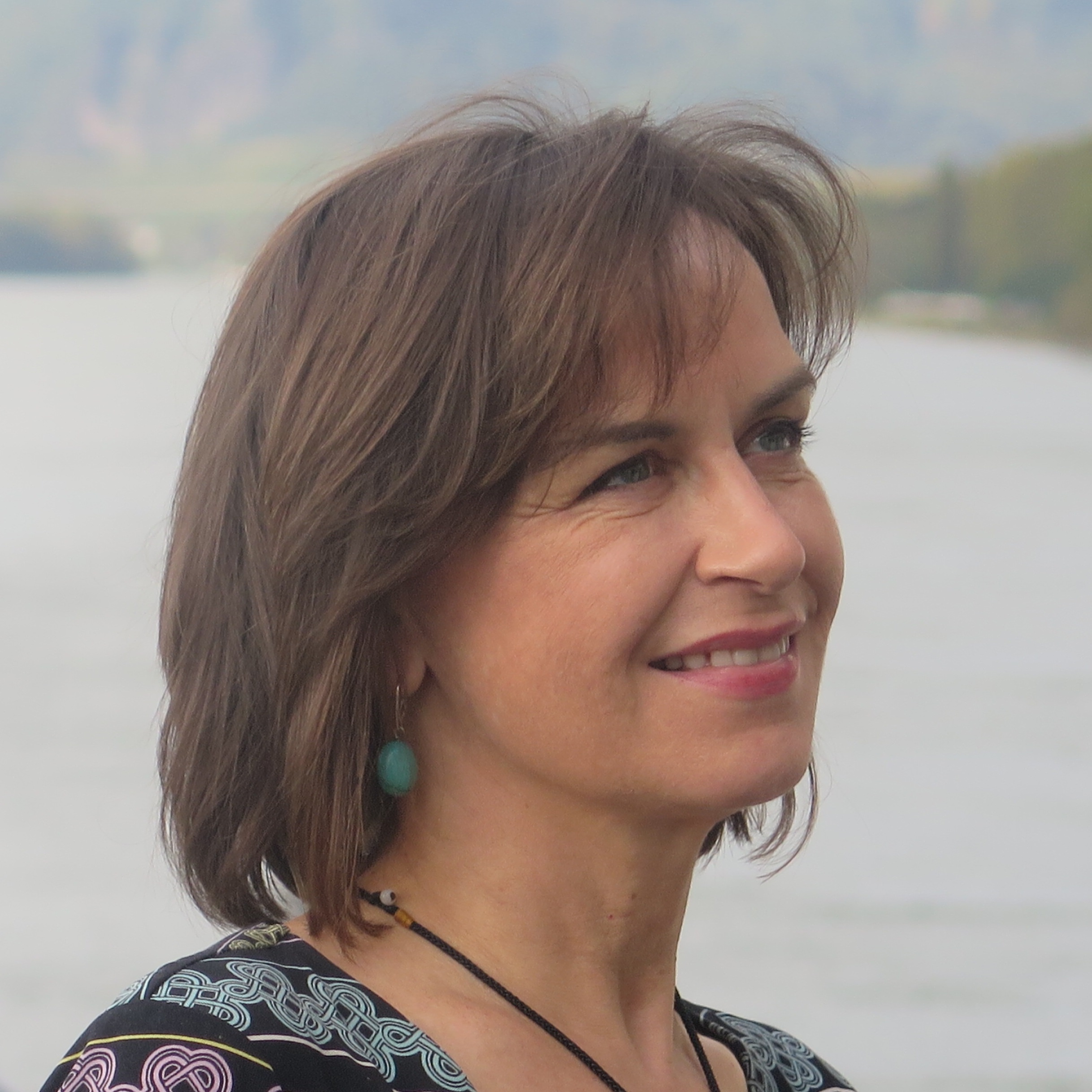
- Education: Massachusetts Institute of Technology
- Known for: Natural language ontology
- Scientific career
- Fields: Linguistics, Philosophy
- Workplaces: French National Centre for Scientific Research

Friederike Moltmann is a German linguist and philosopher. She has done pioneering work at the intersection of philosophy and linguistics, especially on the interface between metaphysics and natural language semantics, but also on the interface between philosophy of mind and mathematics. She is an important proponent of natural language ontology. She is currently Research Director at the French National Centre for Scientific Research (CNRS) in Paris.

== Biography ==
The daughter of the German Protestant theologians Jürgen Moltmann and Elisabeth Moltmann-Wendel, Moltmann studied linguistics, philosophy and mathematics in Berlin and Munich. Her PhD, awarded in 1992, was carried out at Massachusetts Institute of Technology under the supervision of Noam Chomsky. Following this, she taught at various universities in the US and the UK. In 2006, she was appointed Research Director at CNRS. Since 2013, she has been a visiting researcher at New York University, and in 2016 she was Visiting Professor at the University of Padua.

Moltmann is founder of the annual Semantics and Philosophy in Europe colloquium, and founder member of the International Center for Formal Ontology in Warsaw.

== Awards and honours ==
In 2007, she received a Chair of Excellence from the French National Research Agency on the topic of "Ontological Structure and Semantic Structure".

== Work ==
Her core research area is the relation between linguistics and ontology as well as the connection between linguistics and philosophy of mind, philosophy of language, and mathematics. Her research on natural language ontology deals with the semantics of mass nouns, plurals, and part-whole expressions, events and event structure, reference to abstract objects, and tropes (particularized properties) in natural language, the semantics of numerals, and the ontology that forms the basis of the semantics of attitude reports and modal sentences.

Her research integrates philosophy and linguistics in a novel way, often by reviving older concepts or terms from the history of philosophy that seem to be reflected in natural language. For instance, in Parts and Wholes In Semantics (Oxford University Press, 1997) she uses the Aristotelian concept of form and the concept of integrated whole from Gestalt theory to analyse the semantics of plural and mass nouns and expressions referring to parts. In Abstract Objects and the Semantics of Natural Language (Oxford University Press, 2013) she returns to the Aristotelian/medieval category of trope and revives Kazimierz Twardowski's distinction between actions and products.

In other research she uses concepts from contemporary philosophy in the analysis of natural language semantics, such as plural reference, simulation, and truthmaking. Her research also deals with important philosophical concepts from the perspective of natural language: truth, existence, deontic modality, nonexistent objects, and relative truth.

Significant influences on her work include Noam Chomsky and Kit Fine.

== Books ==
- Objects and Attitudes. Oxford University Press, New York 2024. ISBN 9780190878504
- Abstract Objects and the Semantics of Natural Language. Oxford University Press, New York, 2013. ISBN 9780199608744
- Parts and Wholes in Semantics. Oxford University Press, New York, 1997. Paperback, 2003. ISBN 9780195154931
- Individuation und Lokalität. Studien zur Ereignis- und Nominalphrasensemantik. (Individuation and locality: Studies on the semantics of event and nominal phrases.) Fink Verlag, Munich 1992. ISBN 3770527313

== Edited volumes ==
- Unity and Plurality. Logic, Philosophy, and Semantics. Edited with Massimiliano Carrara and Alexandra Arapinis, Oxford University Press, Oxford, 2016. ISBN 9780198716327
- Act-Based Conceptions of Propositional Content. Historical and Contemporary Perspectives. Edited with Mark Textor, Oxford University Press, New York, 2017. ISBN 9780199373574

== Encyclopaedia entries ==
- 'Natural Language Ontology'. Oxford Research Encyclopedia of Linguistics. Oxford University Press, New York, April 2017.
- 'Natural Language and its Ontology'. In A. Goldman / B. McLaughlin (eds): Metaphysics and Cognitive Science, Oxford UP, 2019, ISBN 9780190639679.
- 'Natural Language Ontology'. In R. Bliss/J. Miller (eds.): Routledge Handbook of Metametaphyics, London, 2020 ISBN 9781138082250

== Links ==
- Website of Friederike Moltmann
- Interview with 3:AM Magazine
- Page on Academia.edu
- PhilPapers profile
