= Pisary, Lower Silesian Voivodeship =

Pisary
- Village
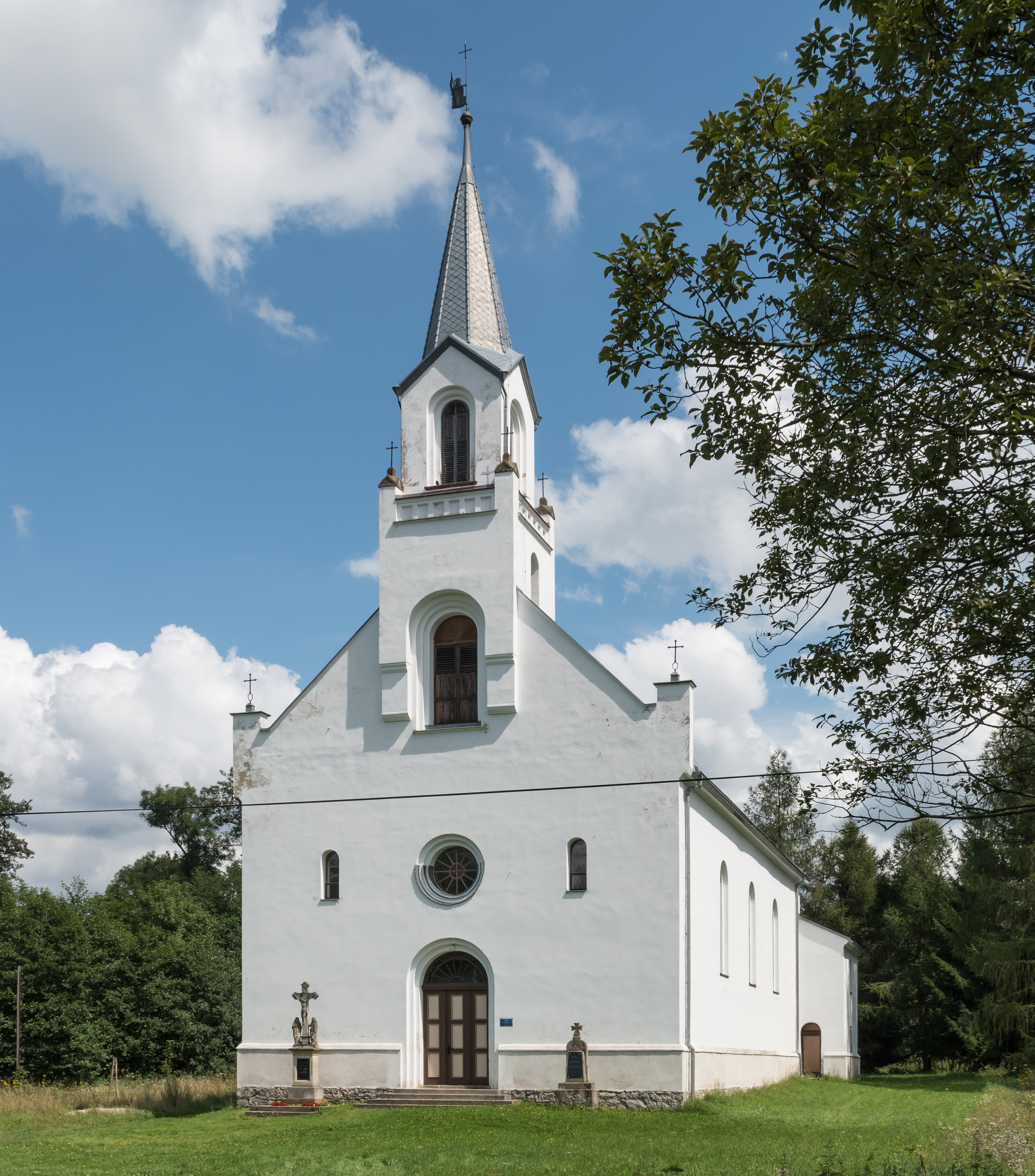
- Catholic church

- Location within Poland
- Coordinates: 50°7′42″N 16°42′59″E
- Country: Poland
- Voivodeship: Lower Silesian
- County: Kłodzko
- Gmina: Międzylesie

Pisary [piˈsarɨ] is a village in the administrative district of Gmina Międzylesie, within Kłodzko County, Lower Silesian Voivodeship, in southwestern Poland.

== Notable residents ==
- Hans Iwand (1899–1960), German Lutheran theologian
