= Elisabeth Moltmann-Wendel =

German feminist theologian (1926–2016)

- Born: Elisabeth Wendel; 25 July 1926; Herne, Rhine Province, Prussia, Germany
- Died: 7 June 2016 (aged 89); Tübingen, Baden-Württemberg, Germany
- Education: Friedrich Wilhelm University of Berlin; University of Tübingen; University of Göttingen
- Occupation: Pioneering feminist theologian
- Spouse: Jürgen Moltmann
- Children: 5

Elisabeth Moltmann-Wendel (25 July 1926 – 7 June 2016) was a German feminist theologian, best remembered as the founder of the European Society of Women in Theological Research (ESWTR) in 1986. Her publications translated into English include Liberty, Equality, Sisterhood: The Women around Jesus, A Land Flowing with Milk and Honey, I Am My Body, and Rediscovering Friendship.

== Life ==
=== Provenance and early years ===
Elisabeth Wendel was born at Herne, a large industrial town a short distance to the west of Dortmund. The entire surrounding region was at that time heavily dependent on mining. She was just 6 in 1933 when the Hitler government took power. Her parents were traditionalist nationalists who detested everything about National Socialism, but as far back as she could ever remember she understood that she must avoid repeating at school everything that was said at home. In 1934 her father died through illness and her mother relocated with the children to Potsdam, just outside Berlin. In 1936, by now aged 10, she found she had become a member of the Hitler Youth organisation after a leather-working club of which she was a member became subsumed into it. Hitler Youth membership became mandatory at her school a year later. In Potsdam her mother became increasingly involved with the so-called "Bekennende Kirche" ("Confessing Church"), which had emerged during the 1930s as a reaction by protestant churchmen (and others), such as Karl Barth, Dietrich Bonhoeffer and Wilhelm Busch, to government moves to unify Germany's traditionally fragmented protestant church organisations into a single semi-nationalised "Deutsche Evangelische Kirche" ("Church of Germany"). Elisabeth Wendel herself joined the "Bekennende Kirche" in 1942 and was thereafter, according to her obituarist Brigitte Enzner-Probst, spiritually moulded by it.

=== A woman and a theology student ===
The tide of the war had turned against Germany in 1942, and the security services had become more intolerant than ever of signs of political dissent on the home front. It was more important than ever for Wendel and her family that she should avoid mentioning at school her membership in the "Bekennende Kirche". Like many in Germany, as a teenager she led in effect two carefully separated parallel lives. In 1944 it was the turn of Wendel and her classmates to be conscripted for military service and she spent the year undertaking labouring work in support of the army until the Soviet army arrived and in Potsdam the Nazi nightmare was replaced by a new set of horrors and uncertainties.

After May 1945, she was able to travel from her Potsdam home to Berlin, some 15 miles (25 kilometers) away, to attend lectures in Protestant Theology, initially at a Church College and subsequently at the Friedrich Wilhelm University of Berlin (as it was still known at that time). In 1945, Berlin had been divided for administrative purposes between the armies of the USA, Britain, France and the Soviet Union: the Friedrich Wilhelm University of Berlin had ended up administered as part of the Soviet occupation zone. As the Soviet military administration became established she and her contemporaries found themselves under increasing pressure to choose between a version of God and a version of Marx. Many chose Marx, but Wendel chose God. For Wendel, progressing her study of theology would become easier in the American or British occupation zones than if she remained in Potsdam.

She later secured a place at the University of Tübingen. She was, however, "disappointed with the Theology Faculty there", and while sources are vague over time lines in respect of this period, Wendel's stay at the University of Tübingen was relatively brief, and is indeed ignored by some sources. In 1947, Elisabeth Wendel switched to the University of Göttingen where she continued her studies in Theology. She was, in particular, encouraged in her studies by Otto Weber, the University Professor in Protestant Theology.

=== Jürgen Moltmann ===
Jürgen Moltmann was another student at Göttingen. According to his own writings, he asked Otto Weber, who was supervising Elisabeth Wendel's doctoral dissertation, to supervise his own doctorate "in order to be closer to her". Jürgen Moltmann and Elisabeth Wendel were married in a civil ceremony at Basel on 17 March 1952. The couple's first baby was stillborn for reasons unknown. Between 1955 and 1963, they had four daughters, all of whom survived. Later, in a work of autobiography, Elisabeth Moltmann-Wendel would recall about motherhood: "I was no longer 'a nobody', in the way that was sometimes enforced on me by 'just a wife' existence.... But barely perceptibly and slowly I moved into a role that I could never have imagined". (Note: "Ich genoss die Schwangerschaften… Ich war nicht mehr ein „Nobody“, wie es sich mir in meiner Nur-Ehefrau-Existenz zuweilen aufdrängte ... Aber langsam schleichend geriet ich doch in eine Rolle, die ich mir nie gedacht hatte.")

=== Scholarship ===
By the time of the marriage Wendel had received her doctorate, becoming the second woman to achieve this distinction at the University of Göttingen. Her project concerned the life and theological contributions of the Amsterdam theologian Hermann Friedrich Kohlbrugge. Jürgen's doctorate, on Moses Amyraut and his teaching on predestination, would follow a few months later, still in 1952.

=== Domesticity ===
Between 1952 and 1972 Elisabeth Moltmann-Wendel had very little public profile. As a married woman, there were fewer job opportunities available to her within church institutions than there would have been if she had remained single. Looking after her infant daughters kept her busy during the 1950s and 1960s. There were frequent house moves in connection with her husband's career. During the 1960s she nevertheless found time to research and publish the occasional scholarly paper relating to theology. By 1970 the family were living in Tübingen: where the Moltmanns would continue to live out Elisabeth's life.

One morning in August 1972, she later wrote, Moltmann-Wendel's world underwent a 180 ° about turn. This was her description of her "feminist-theological awakening". It seems to have followed an incremental build-up driven by various articles that friends brought her from the USA, concerning the feminist movement there and trends in theology (and sometimes on both of these at once). In terms of the iterative deductive reasoning familiar from traditional German teaching methods, this new material seemed to turn the thought-process on its head, starting not from some theological premise, but from women themselves, including their societal contexts and their lived experiences. Suddenly Moltmann-Wendel felt that she was included in something. In terms of her own theology, from this point concrete life experiences - especially the seemingly trivial daily experiences of women, became the starting point for all her theological reflections.

=== Feminist theology ===
Feminist theology had already emerged in North America through during 1960s by the time Moltmann-Wendel discovered it. She built on what she learned of it in a series of books and other publications, focusing on a succession of sub-topics and developing themes for each. Even among scholars, the concept of feminist theology was largely unfamiliar in West Germany in 1972. During the mid-1970s there were many mainstream theologians who found the underlying base concepts of feminist theology more than strange. Twn years later some of the conservatives had been won round, while most others implicitly acknowledged its legitimacy. The contention that Feminism and Theology were mutually exclusive was no longer on the agenda in university faculties.

"Wholeness" ("Ganzheit") and "women's experience" ("Erfahrung von Frauen") became the core interpretational tools of Moltmann-Wendel's biblical understanding and, more broadly, of her theology. "I am good: I am whole: I am beautiful!" (Note: "Ich bin gut – ich bin ganz – ich bin schön!") became the mantra she employed to recast Lutheran Justification doctrines for women in both bodily and holistic terms. For Moltmaann-Wendel "wholeness" always meant a unity of body and spirit, of political action and theological underpinning. A quasi-binary distinction between body and spirit could not be intellectually sustained because it stems from a tradition whereby the body is given a "sacred" significance. Tellingly, her definitions of the Last Supper and of Christian baptism rituals, based on the widely-shared experiences of women, met with harsh criticism from the traditionalist Evangelical-Lutheran Church in Württemberg. That was part of the context for her establishment of the "Fernstudium Feministische Theologie" ("Feminist Theology Distance Learning") project in Württemberg. The flair that Moltmaann-Wendel repeatedly displayed for formulating the central tenets of feminist theology in terms that instantly made sense to the women in (and outside) the pews led to admirers describing her, with affection, as "the mother of the ecclesiastical women's movement" in Germany.

Another important focus of her theological investigations lay in her engagement with the Political philosophy of Hannah Arendt and Arendt's work on "Natality". An appetite for new beginnings, deep curiosity about life and a simple "love for the world" were things that Moltmann-Wendel shared with Arendt. In a contribution during the 1990s to the anthology "Im Einklang mit dem Kosmos" ("In Harmony with the Cosmos") she included a plea in support of Arendt's personal compilation "Denken ohne Geländer", and thereby urged her readers to think through the doctrine of the Incarnation uncompromisingly to a conclusion. A deep love for everything corporeal-sensual and for the Earth ran through Moltmann-Wendel's thinking. Her autobiography demonstrates this vividly. In the context of the various New Testament stories of Jesus healing women, the importance of women's bodies for theological understanding becomes another interpretational key to her thinking.

In pursuit of her urge to communicate and to test her ideas, Elisabeth Moltmann-Wendel was a copious networker, especially with other female theologians. As early as the 1980s the Tübingen home that she shared with her husband - by this time a noted theological scholar on his own account - was a meeting place for theologians from Germany, Austria, Switzerland and further afield. Regular guests included her friend Herlinde Pissarek-Hudelist, a theologian from Innsbrick, who in 1988 became the first ever female dean of a Catholic theology faculty. Others included Catharina Halkes from Nijmegen, Helen Schüngel-Straumann from (originally) Switzerland and Elisabeth Gössmann who had received her doctorate in Theology from the Ludwig-Maximilians-Universität München at the same time as Joseph Ratzinger. 1954 had been the first year in which doctorates in catholic theology were awarded in Germany. Between 1955 and 1986, Gössmann had worked in Tokyo, but the final decades of her teaching career she spent back in Europe. In 1986 Moltmann-Wendel involved in creating the "Europäische Gesellschaft für theologische Forschung von Frauen“ (ESWTR / "European Society of Women in Theological Research").

In order to secure and preserve the rapidly increasing fruits of researches in Feminist theology, Moltmann-Wendel joined with Pissarek-Hudelist and others to launch the "Wörterbuch der Feministischen Theologie" ("Dictionary of Feminist Theology") in 1980 which, now into its second edition, remains a standard work. She turned town invitations to help on preparing the feminist "Bibel in gerechter Sprache" ("Bible in the right language"). She shared the belief that "the language of the [Lutheran and later] bible(s), like the church itself [was] male-sexist", but she believed that the guidelines for this particular project were excessively rigid and one-sided.

== Publications (selection) ==
- Hoffnung jenseits von Glaube und Skepsis (Theologische Existenz heute. Neue Folge Nr. 112). Chr. Kaiser Verlag, München 1964.
- Frauenbefreiung – Biblische und theologische Argumente. München 1976.
- Ein eigener Mensch werden. Frauen um Jesus. Gütersloh 1980.
- Das Land, wo Milch und Honig fließt. Gütersloh 1985.
- Als Frau und Mann von Gott reden. München 1991.
- Wer die Erde nicht berührt, kann den Himmel nicht erreichen. Zürich 1997 (Autobiografie).
- Wach auf, meine Freundin. Die Wiederkehr der Gottesfreundschaft. Stuttgart 2000.
