= Karl Bornhäuser =

German theologian

Karl Bornhäuser (19 May 1868, in Mannheim – 27 March 1947, in Marburg) was a German New Testament theologian.

He studied theology at the universities of Halle and Greifswald, where he was a student of Hermann Cremer. He worked as a clergyman in Sinsheim (from 1890) and Karlsruhe (from 1892), and as a regional pastor in Rastatt (from 1894). In 1902 he became an associate professor of systematic and practical theology at the University of Greifswald, and from 1907 to 1933, he taught classes as a full professor at the University of Marburg. From 1912 onward, he was a member of the consistory in Kassel.

== Selected works ==
- Das Wirken des Christus durch Taten und Worte, 1921 – The work of Christ by words and deeds.
- Die Bergpredigt : Versuch einer zeitgenössischen Auslegung, 1923 – The Sermon on the Mount: essay of a contemporary interpretation.
- Das Johannesevangelium : eine Missionsschrift für Israel, 1928 – The Gospel of John: Scriptures for Israel.
- Die Geburts- und Kindheitsgeschichte Jesu; Versuch einer zeitgenössischen Auslegung von Matthäus 1 und 2 und Lukas 1-3, 1930 – The birth and childhood history of Jesus; essay of a contemporary interpretation of the Gospel of Matthew 1 and 2 and Gospel of Luke 1-3.
- Studien zum Sondergut des Lukas, 1934 – Studies on unique material from the Gospel of Luke.
- Studien zur Apostelgeschichte, 1934 – Studies on the history of the Apostles.
- Der Christ und seine Habe nach dem Neuen Testament; eine soziologische studie, 1934 – The Christian and his possessions according to the New Testament; a sociological study.
- The death and resurrection of Jesus Christ, (translated into English by A. Rumpus, 1958).
