= Perichoresis =

Father, Son, and Holy Spirit relationships

Gothic triskele window element

In Christian theology, perichoresis (from Ancient Greek: περιχώρησις, romanized: perikhōrēsis, lit. 'rotation') is the relationship of the three persons of the triune God (Father, Son, and Holy Spirit) to one another. The term was first used theologically by the Church Fathers. As a noun, the word first appears in the writings of Maximus Confessor (d. 662), but the related verb perichoreo is found earlier in the work of Gregory of Nazianzus (d. 389/90). Gregory used the word to describe the relationship between the divine and human natures of Christ, as did John of Damascus (d. 749), who also extended it to the "interpenetration" of the three persons of the Trinity, and it became a technical term for the latter. "Circumincession" is a Latin-derived term for the same concept. However, the idea was present in Latin Christianity even before the Eastern fathers; this is made explicit by St. Hillary's De Trinitate. Augustine also writes in his De Trinitate (On the Trinity):

but in that highest Trinity one is as much as the three together, nor are two anything more than one. And They are infinite in themselves. So both each are in each, and all in each, and each in all, and all in all, and all are one.

The term has been given recent currency by such contemporary writers as Jürgen Moltmann, Miroslav Volf, John Zizioulas, Richard Rohr, and others. Modern authors extend the original usage as an analogy to cover other interpersonal relationships. The term "co(-)inherence" is sometimes used as a synonym.

== Etymology ==
"Perichoresis" is derived from the Greek peri, "around" and chōreō, "to go, or come". As a compound word, it refers primarily to "going around" or "encompassing", conveying the idea of "two sides of the same coin". Suggested connections with Greek words for dancing ("choreia", spelled with the short letter omicron not the long omega) are not grounded in Greek etymology or early Christian use, but are modern in origin. The Latin equivalent circumincession comes from the Latin circum, "around" and incedere meaning "to go, to step, to march along", and was first used by Burgundio of Pisa (d. 1194). The form "Circuminsessio" developed from the similarity in sound.

== Usage ==
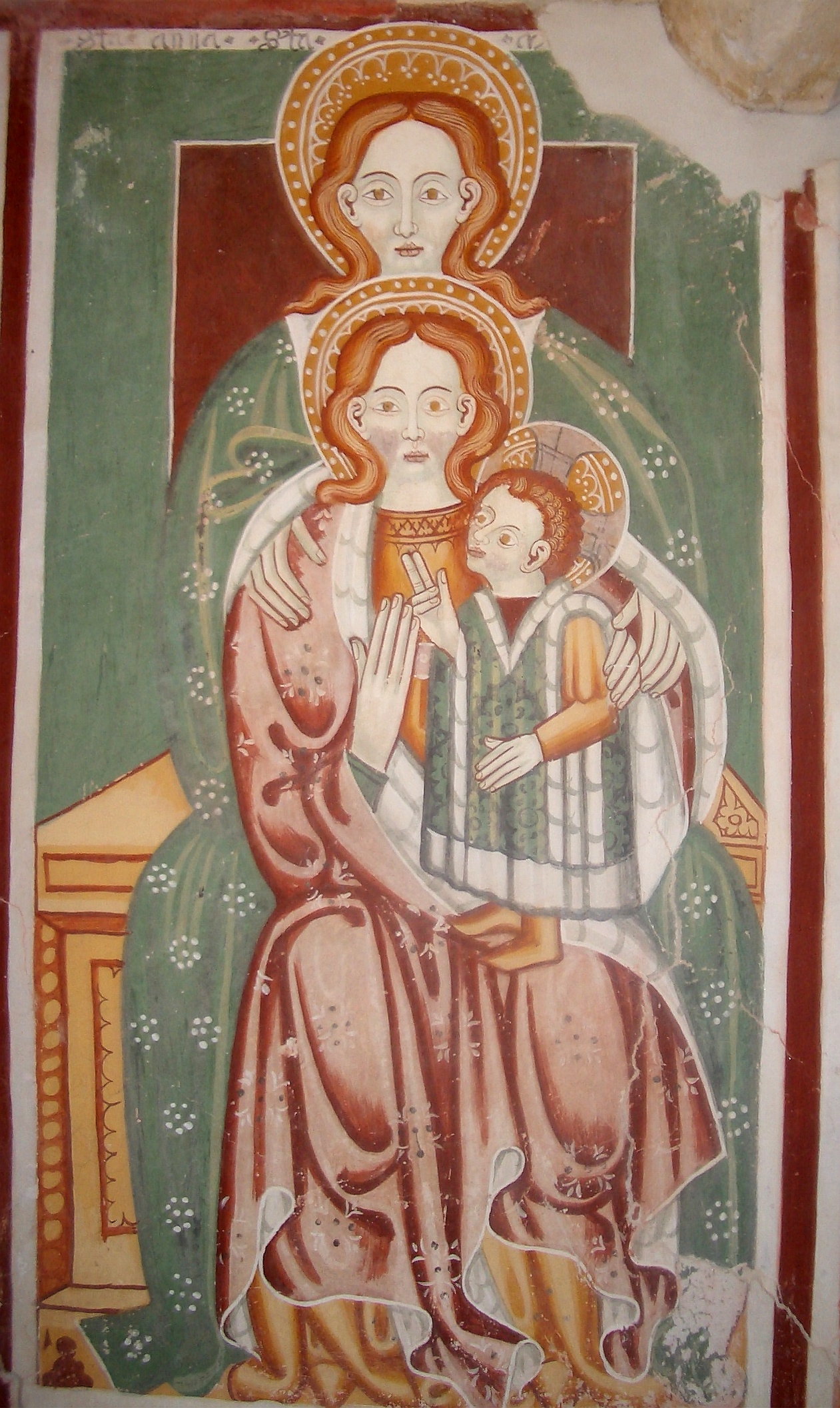
A trinitarian action of grace is implied in sacred art of the type Anna selbdritt: creator Father, redeemer Son, reflexive procession of the Holy Spirit, with the divine Christ-child pointing back at his human mother and grandmother.

The relationship of the Triune God is intensified by the relationship of perichoresis. This indwelling expresses and realizes fellowship between the Father and the Son. It is intimacy. Jesus compares the oneness of this indwelling to the oneness of the fellowship of his church from this indwelling. "That they all may be one; as thou, Father, art in me, and I in thee, that they also may be one in us" (John 17:21). The great 12th century Cistercian reformer St. Bernard of Clairvaux spoke of the Holy Spirit as the kiss of God, the Holy Spirit being thus not generated but proceeding from the love of the Father and the Son through an act of their unified will.

If, as is properly understood, the Father is he who kisses, the Son he who is kissed, then it cannot be wrong to see in the kiss the Holy Spirit, for he is the imperturbable peace of the Father and the Son, their unshakable bond, their undivided love, their indivisible unity. – St. Bernard of Clairvaux, in Sermon 8, Sermons on the Song of Songs

The devotion of themselves to each other in the Spirit by the Father and the Son has content. Not only does the procession of the Spirit from the Father to the Son and from the Son to the Father express their mutual love, as they breathe after each other, but also it gives each to the other. In the procession of the Spirit from the Father, the Father gives himself to the Son; in the procession of the Spirit from the Son to the Father, and in this use of the word "procession" from the Son is meant the sending of the Holy Spirit as the Son teaches that the Holy Spirit proceeds from the Father, the Son gives himself to the Father in prayer, for the procession of the Spirit, like the begetting of the Son, is the going forth of the being of the Father to the Son and the going forth of the being of the Son to the Father as the Holy Spirit.

The property of divine grace in the Trinitarian mission is distinct for each person or hypostase of the Holy Trinity yet united, communing, indwelling, in Trinitarian love. All is God's gift from the Father, through the Son's Incarnation and in the gift of the Holy Spirit. This relational co-inherence is often represented as Borromean rings or the Scutum Fidei.

== Church Fathers ==
The relationship between the Father, Son and Holy Spirit was not explicitly expressed in the writings of Ante-Nicene Fathers exactly as it would later be defined during the First Council of Nicaea (325) and the First Council of Constantinople (381), namely as one substance (ousia) and three persons (hypostaseis). A hermeneutic of the one-in-three principle slowly approached the synthesis understood today as perichoresis.

== Human body as icon of the communio personarum ==
The crucial point, in a word, is that the relation to God, and to others in God, that establishes the individual substance in being is generous. The relation itself makes and lets me in my substantial being be. This "letting be" implies a kind of primordial, ontological "circumincession", or "perichoresis", of giving and receiving between the other and myself. What I am in my original constitution as a person has always already been given to me by God and received by me in and as my response to God's gift to me of myself ― indeed, has also, in some significant sense, been given to me by other creatures and received by me in and as my response to their gift to me.

― David L. Schindler, "The Embodied Person as Gift and the Cultural Task in America: Status quaestionis" Communio 35 (Fall 2008)

Pope John Paul II taught a series of catecheses on the mystery of the indwelling of the Holy Spirit in the sacramental life of the faithful Christian. The anthropological aspects of the agency of the human heart—its capacity for the gift of love and to give love in return—lived out in moral acts of social justice has since become known as his Theology of the Body. Seen more specifically as a development in perennial wisdom of Church dogma, the Natural Law, the indwelling of God in the human heart is, as taught by St. Augustine a gift of grace, perfecting nature. This philosophical approach to a deeper theological truth of the human person's need for God was developed into a systematic metaphysics by St. Thomas Aquinas, Man as the image of God.

Interpretations of the incarnational mystery of the perpetual virginity of the Mother of God were frequently executed by artisans in relational form, most recognisably as Madonna, some works depicting three generations as in Metterza. The mutual reciprocity contained in a personalist phenomological approach to the philosophy of being draws attention to man's need for transcendence, that a duality between good and evil is not sufficient to explain the mystery of human social relations in community. John Henry Newman popularised the Latin aphorism "cor ad cor loquitur" or heart speaks unto heart (first coined two centuries before by the Doctor of the Church Francis de Sales, "cor cordi loquitur") to describe adequately communicating the graced intimacy of man's conformity to Jesus' loving obedience to his Father's divine will unto death. Similarly, St. Augustine had written a millennium before, "Sonus verborum nostrorum aures percutit; magister intus est", that when a teacher speaks worthily of divine things, as the sound of the words strike our ears, it is no longer mere words but God himself who enters.

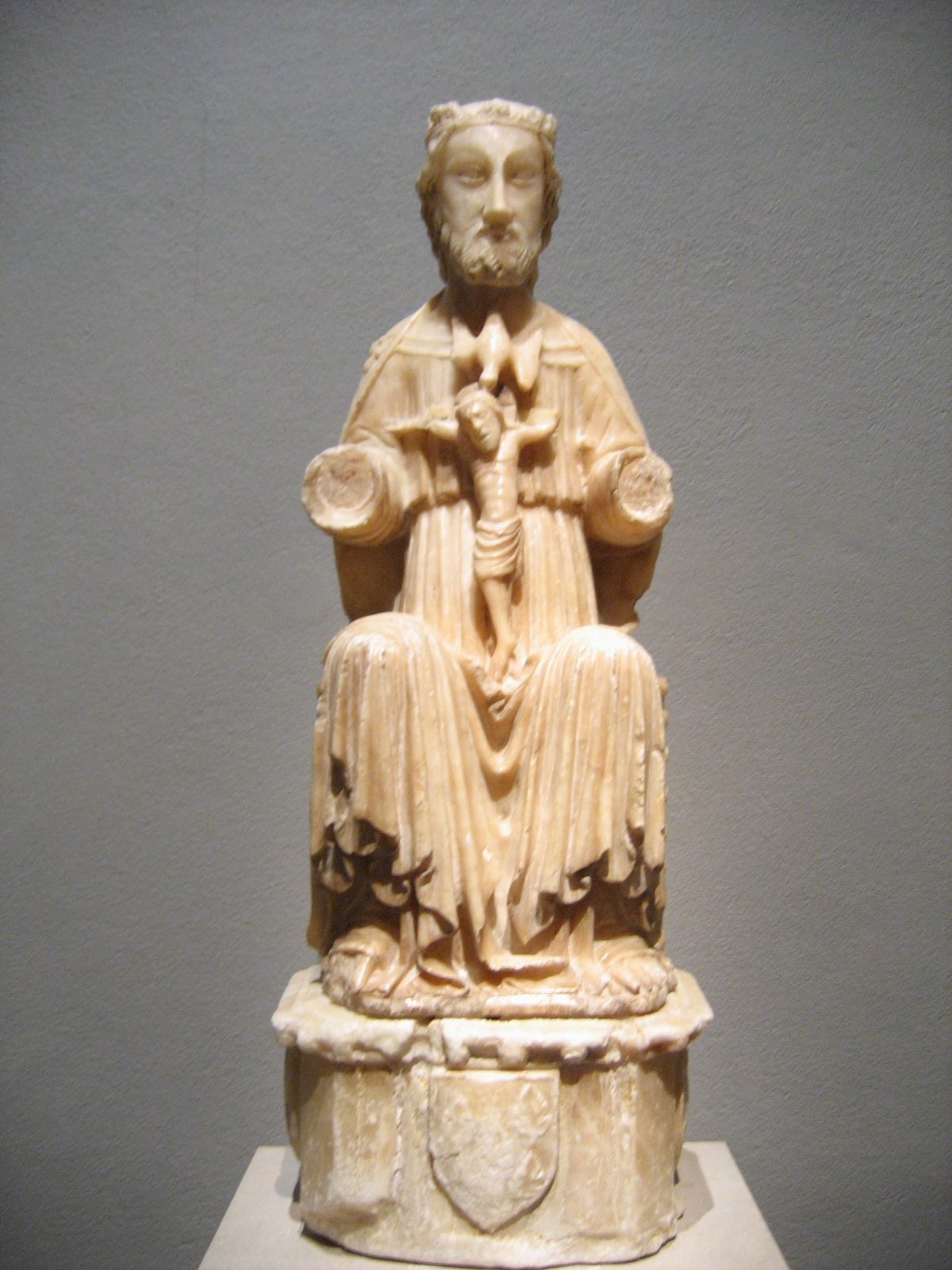
The sacramental economy of grace indwelling in Mother Church is implied in sacred art of the type Holy Trinity: creator Father, reflexive procession of the Holy Spirit through the sacrificial kenosis on the Cross, celebrated on the altar

... these analyses implicitly presuppose the reality of the Absolute Being

― Pope John Paul II in "Memory and identity: Conversations at the Dawn of a Millennium"

This existential, social aspect of divine grace indwelling in human action is what heals the divisions of a society rent by the irrational dictates of reductionist relativism of mind over matter that equates the physical impulse with vice and cerebral indifference with virtue:

Were this... to be taken to extremes, the essence of Christianity would be detached from the vital relations fundamental to human existence, and would become a world apart, admirable perhaps, but decisively cut off from the complex fabric of human life.

― Pope Benedict XVI on the nature of love in Deus caritas est (God is love)

=== Radiation of Fatherhood ===
The Carmelite mystic Saint John of the Cross sketched his vision of this perspective (from the head of the cross looking down upon those gathered at the foot) corresponding to the Father's love radiating down on the priest and congregation worshiping at the altar. Salvador Dalí was inspired to paint his monumental work Christ of Saint John of the Cross after a spiritual crisis saw him revert to his childhood faith upon reading John's classic Dark Night of the Soul.

== Doctrinal differences ==
Catholics and Protestants differ in their interpretation of communio as model of ecclesial unity binding on members of the Mystical body of Christ. A dyadically reduced trinitarianism underpins the Barthian school of thought.

"The Father remains the sole principle, because the Son has nothing he has not received from this source. But the Trinity is asymmetrical reciprocity, not a symmetrical hierarchy proceeding from the Father. Its asymmetry is precisely the root of its dynamism as eternal Act, eternal "perichoresis". On this logic, Barth's pneumatological minimalism cannot be inherently rooted in the filioque. My own hunch is that Barth's binitarianism is more deeply planted in that other culprit Jenson identifies: the "merely two-sided understanding of human community and so of historical reality, inherited from the 'I-Thou' tradition of 19th-century German philosophical anthropology".

― Aaron Riches, "Church, Eucharist, and Predestination in Barth and de Lubac: CONVERGENCE AND DIVERGENCE IN COMMUNIO" Communio 35 (Winter 2008).

== Bibliography ==
- DURAND, Emmanuel, La périchorèse des personnes divines : immanence mutuelle – réciprocité et communion, Paris: Cerf (Cogitation Fidei; 243), 2005, 409 p.
- Hikota, Riyako C., "Beyond Metaphor: The Trinitarian Perichōrēsis and Dance", Open Theology 8 (2022), pp. 50–63, Open Access: Beyond Metaphor: The Trinitarian Perichōrēsis and Dance
- Lane G. Tipton, "The Function of Perichoresis and the Divine Incomprehensibility", Westminster Theological Journal, Fall 2002.
- David J. Engelsma, Trinity and Covenant, Reformed Free Publishing Association, 2006.
- Stamatovic, Slobodan, "The Meaning of Perichoresis", Open Theology 2 (2016), pp. 303–326, Open Access: The Meaning of Perichoresis
