= Christopher Morse =

American Christian theologian (born 1935)

The Reverend Christopher Morse
- Born: 1935 (age 90–91)

Ecclesiastical career
- Religion: Christianity (Methodist)
- Church: United Methodist Church

Academic background
- Education: Randolph–Macon College; Yale University; Union Theological Seminary
- Influences: Karl Barth

Academic work
- Discipline: Theology
- Sub-discipline: Dogmatics
- Institutions: Union Theological Seminary
- Influenced: Fleming Rutledge

Christopher Ludwig Morse (born 1935) is an American Christian theologian. He is Dietrich Bonhoeffer Professor of Theology and Ethics at Union Theological Seminary in New York City.

== Early life and education ==
Born in 1935 and raised in Virginia, Morse received a Bachelor of Arts degree in philosophy from Randolph–Macon College, a Master of Divinity degree from Yale Divinity School, and Master of Sacred Theology and Doctor of Philosophy degrees from Union Theological Seminary. He is an ordained elder in the United Methodist Church.

== Viewpoints ==
Morse's areas of scholarly concentration are dogmatics and ethics. He teaches extensively on the great systematic and dogmatic theologians, especially John Calvin, Karl Barth, Thomas Aquinas, and Friedrich Schleiermacher.

Prominent in his main work, Not Every Spirit, is the notion of "faithful disbelief", a reference to 1 John 4:1. Essentially, Morse stands the older dogmatic traditions on their head. While most theologians argue for what Christians should believe, Morse argues for what people of faith should not believe, but rather actively "disbelieve".

Some examples of Morse's "Christian Disbeliefs" are:

- Refusal to equate the Word of God with an object, including the Bible, turning God into a thing.
- Refusal to believe that God's Word in scripture violates witness of God to the heart.
- Refusal to believe that God's witness in the heart denies God's Word in scriptures.
- Refusal to believe that love, as defined with reference to God, can be defeated.
- Refusal to believe that God is other than Father, Son, and Spirit.
- Refusal to believe that God is three gods.
- Refusal to believe that any form of domination is from God that is not the dominion of love.
- Refusal to believe that the life of Jesus Christ is not fully human.
- Refusal to believe that the Jesus Christ is not fully God.
- Refusal to believe that Jesus Christ is limited by time and space.
- Refusal to believe that the risen Christ is somehow different from the incarnate Christ.
- Refusal to believe that we can cause faith in another.
- Refusal to believe that God the Holy Spirit is not life giving.
- Refusal to believe that evil is of equal status to good.
- Refusal to believe that the future belong to any but God, or that there is no future.
- Refusal to believe that any situation is hopeless – any situation.
- Refusal to believe that humans do not need saving.
- Refusal to believe that Jesus Christ is too unlike humans to save them.
- Refusal to believe that Jesus Christ is too like others to be able to save humans.
- Refusal to believe that we are truly human apart from other humans.
- Refusal to believe that God dishonors the human body and that we will be raised as disembodied spirits.
- Refusal to believe that Church members are more loved than non-church members.
- Refusal to believe that the Church is limited by the successes and failures of its members.

He has argued that there is a charge from God upon the Christian community to discern the will of God again in every generation, time, and place and to be watchful for those aspects of the tradition which are unfaithful to the will and Word of God.

Morse's work shows that he has been deeply shaped by the theology of Karl Barth. However, he is clearly no Barthian, and is additionally influenced by the classical theologies of Augustine, Thomas Aquinas, John Wesley, Martin Luther, John Calvin, and Huldrych Zwingli. Among recent theologians, Morse has been deeply influenced by the work of Reformed theologians Jurgen Moltmann, H. Richard Niebuhr, and Paul Lehmann. Morse's work could be categorized as an example of the so-called Yale School theology.
