= Herlinde Pissarek-Hudelist =

Austrian theologian and university teacher (1932–1994)

Herlinde Pissarek-Hudelist (1932–1994) was professor of Catechetics and Religious Education at the Catholic Theological Faculty, University of Innsbruck, Austria. the first full professor of Catholic Theology at a university in Austria, and the world's first female dean (served from 1989 to 1993) of a Catholic theological faculty. From the early 1980s, Pissarek-Hudelist became interested in feminist theology.

There is a square in Innsbruck named after her.
