= Montouliers =

- Commune
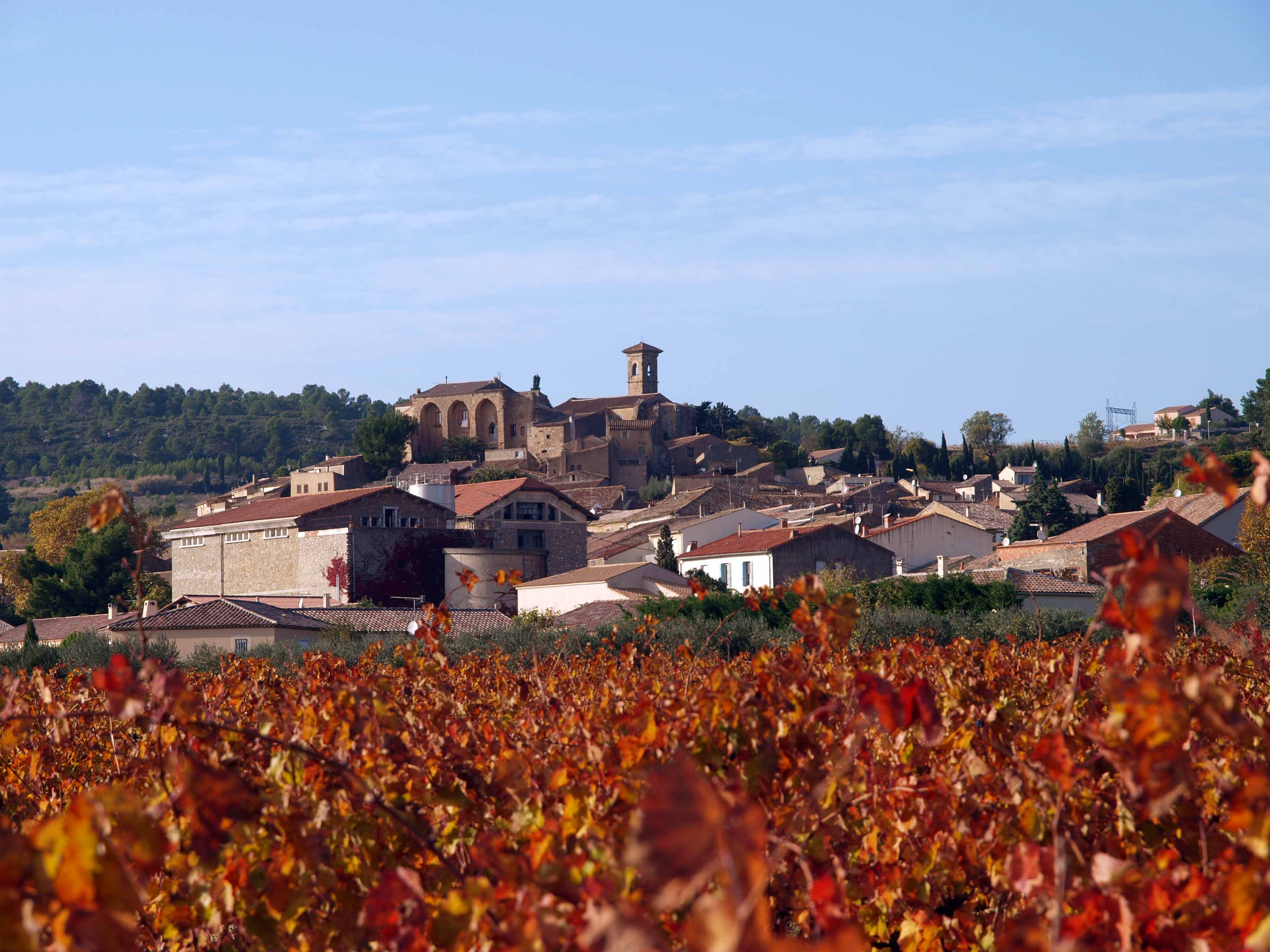
- A general view of Montouliers

- Coat of arms
- Location of Montouliers
- Location within France Location within Occitanie
- Coordinates: 43°20′20″N 2°54′25″E
- Country: France
- Region: Occitania
- Department: Hérault
- Arrondissement: Béziers
- Canton: Saint-Pons-de-Thomières

Government
  - Mayor (2020–2026): Patricia Toulze
- Area^{1}: 7.7 km^{2} (3.0 sq mi)
- Elevation: 160 m (520 ft)
- Highest elevation: 223 m (732 ft)
- Lowest elevation: 43 m (141 ft)
- Population (2023): 242
  - Density: 31/km^{2} (81/sq mi)
- Time zone: UTC+01:00 (CET)
  - Summer (DST): UTC+02:00 (CEST)
- INSEE/Postal code: 34170 /34310
- ^{1} French Land Register data, which excludes lakes, ponds, glaciers > 1 km^{2} (0.386 sq mi or 247 acres) and river estuaries.

Montouliers (French pronunciation: [mɔ̃tulje]; Languedocien: Montolièrs) is a commune in the Hérault department in the Occitanie region in southern France.

== Population ==
Historical population
Year	Pop.	±% p.a.
1968	241	—
1975	210	−1.95%
1982	187	−1.64%
1990	186	−0.07%
1999	201	+0.87%
2007	222	+1.25%
2012	247	+2.16%
2017	212	−3.01%
2023	242	+2.23%
Source: INSEE

== See also ==
- Communes of the Hérault department
