= Jürgen Moltmann =

German Reformed theologian (1926–2024)

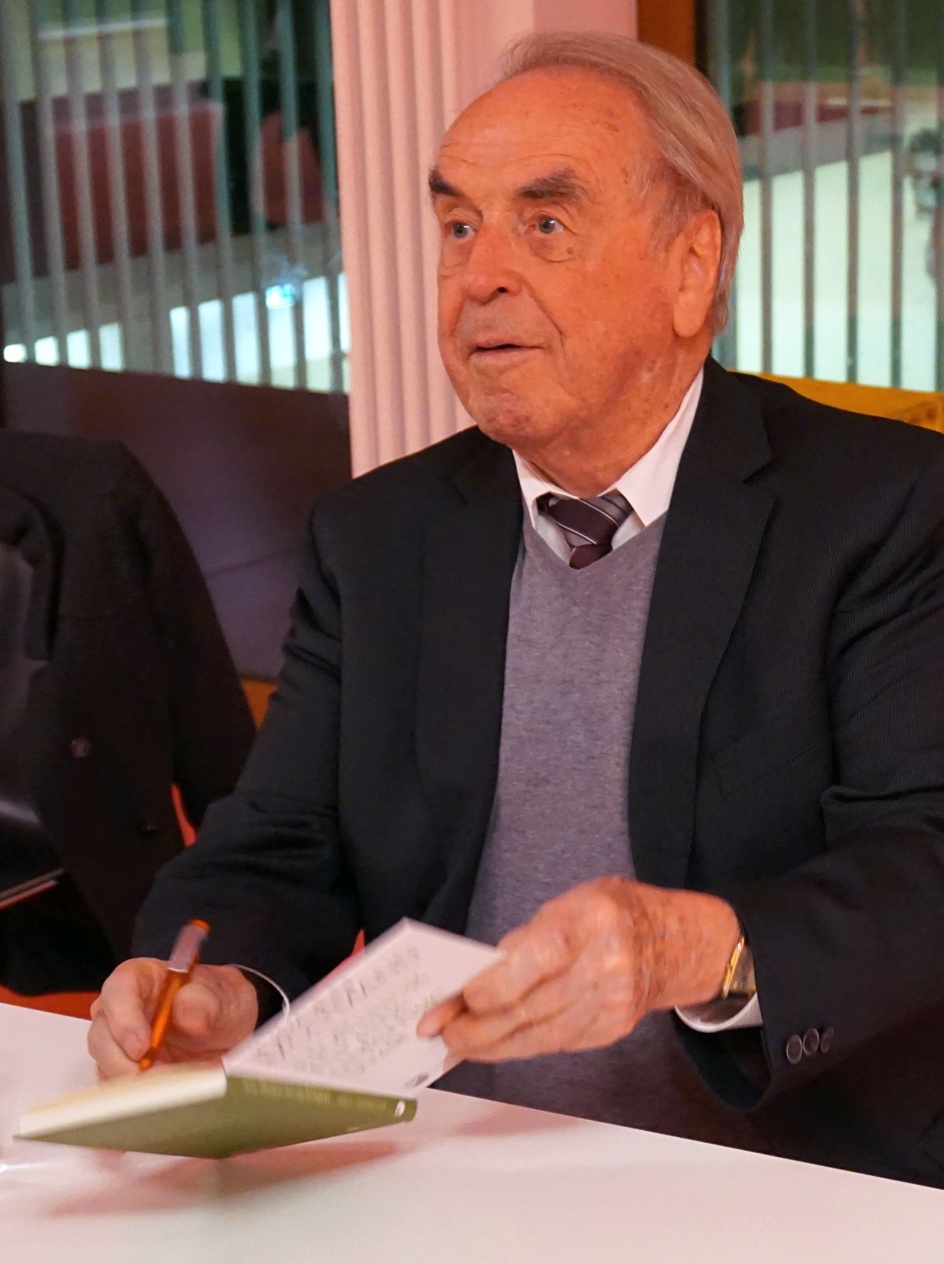
- Moltmann in 2016
- Born: 8 April 1926; Hamburg, Germany
- Died: 3 June 2024 (aged 98); Tübingen, Baden-Württemberg, Germany

Academic background
- Education: University of Göttingen
- Doctoral advisor: Otto Weber
- Influences: Joachim of Fiore; Karl Barth; Ernst Bloch; Christoph Blumhardt; Johann Blumhardt; Hans Iwand

Academic work
- Discipline: Theology
- Sub-discipline: Christology; ecclesiology; eschatology; pneumatology; political theology; systematic theology
- School or tradition: Liberation theology; Reformed Protestantism; Social trinitarianism
- Institutions: University of Bonn; University of Tübingen
- Doctoral students: Hellmut G. Haasis; Miroslav Volf; Michael Welker
- Notable works: Theology of Hope (1964); The Crucified God (1972)
- Influenced: Paul Fiddes; Grace Ji-Sun Kim; Christopher Morse; Roger E. Olson; John Polkinghorne; Andrew Purves; Jon Sobrino; Richard Bauckham

Jürgen Moltmann (German: [ˈmɔltman]; 8 April 1926 – 3 June 2024) was a German Reformed theologian who was a professor of systematic theology at the University of Tübingen and was known for his books such as the Theology of Hope, The Crucified God, God in Creation and other contributions to systematic theology. His works were translated into many languages.

Moltmann described his theology as an extension of Karl Barth's theological works, especially the Church Dogmatics, and he described his work as Post-Barthian. He developed a form of liberation theology predicated on the view that God suffers with humanity, while also promising humanity a better future through the hope of the Resurrection, which he labelled a 'theology of hope'. Much of Moltmann's work was to develop the implications of these ideas for various areas of theology. Moltmann became known for developing a form of social trinitarianism. He was awarded several international honorary doctorates.

== Life and career ==
=== Youth ===
Moltmann was born in Hamburg on 8 April 1926. His father was a teacher; the family was not religious. His grandfather was a grand master of the Freemasons. As a teenager, Moltmann idolized Albert Einstein, and anticipated studying mathematics at university.

=== World War II ===
Moltmann took his entrance exam to proceed with his education but instead was drafted into military service in 1943 at the age of 16, during World War II, serving as an Air Force auxiliary in the German Army. "The reading matter which he took with him into the miseries of war were Goethe's poems and the works of Nietzsche." (Note: The items were a gift from his sister. In other places, Moltmann mentions that "Faust" was included in the collection of Goethe's poetry.) He worked in an anti-aircraft battery during the bombing of his hometown of Hamburg by the Royal Air Force, an attack that killed 40,000 people, including a friend standing next to him. Ordered to the Klever Reichswald, a German forest at the front lines, he surrendered in 1945 in the dark to the first British soldier he met. From 1945 to 1948, he was confined as a prisoner of war (POW) and moved from camp to camp.

He was first confined as a POW in Belgium, then Scotland, then England. In the camp at Belgium, the prisoners were given little to do. Moltmann and his fellow prisoners were tormented by "memories and gnawing thoughts". They had escaped death but had lost all hope and confidence. After Belgium, Moltmann was transferred to a camp in Kilmarnock, Scotland, where he worked with other Germans to rebuild areas damaged by bombing. The hospitality of the Scottish residents toward the prisoners left a great impression upon him. In Scotland, they also saw photographs, nailed up confrontationally in their huts, of Buchenwald and Bergen-Belsen concentration camps. The initial reaction of the prisoners was that these photos were propaganda, but gradually they began to see themselves through the eyes of the Nazis' victims. Moltmann was given a small copy of the New Testament and Psalms by an American chaplain and reading these gave him a new hope, as he recorded in his autobiography:

I read Mark's Gospel as a whole and came to the story of the passion: when I heard Jesus' death cry, 'My God, my God, why have you forsaken me?' I felt growing within me the conviction: this is someone who understands you completely, who is with you in your cry to God and has felt the same forsakenness you are living in now.

In July 1946, he was transferred for the last time to Norton Camp, a British prison located in the village of Cuckney near Nottingham, UK. The camp was operated by the YMCA and here Moltmann met many students of theology. At Norton Camp, he discovered Reinhold Niebuhr's The Nature and Destiny of Man. It was the first book of theology he had ever read, and Moltmann claimed it had a huge impact on his life. His experience as a POW gave him a great understanding of how suffering and hope reinforce each other, leaving a lasting impression on his theology. Moltmann later claimed, "I never decided for Christ, as is often demanded of us, but I am sure that, then and there, in the dark pit of my soul, he found me."

=== After the war ===
Moltmann returned home at 22 years of age to find his hometown of Hamburg (in fact, much of his country) in ruins from Allied bombing in World War II. In 1947, he and four others were invited to attend the first postwar Student Christian Movement in Swanwick, a conference center near Derby, England. The conference affected him deeply. Moltmann returned to Germany to study at the University of Göttingen, an institution whose professors were followers of Karl Barth and theologians who were engaged with the Confessing Church in Germany. He received his doctorate, supervised by Otto Weber, in 1952. From 1952 to 1957, Moltmann was the pastor in Bremen-Wasserhorst, and also pastor for students. In 1958 Moltmann became a theology teacher at the Kirchliche Hochschule Wuppertal that was operated by the Confessing Church and in 1963 he joined the theological faculty at the University of Bonn. He was appointed Professor of Systematic Theology at the University of Tübingen in 1967 and remained there until his retirement in 1994. From 1963 to 1983, Moltmann was a member of the Faith and Order Committee of the World Council of Churches. From 1983 to 1993, Moltmann was the Robert W. Woodruff Distinguished Visiting Professor of Systematic Theology at Candler School of Theology at Emory University in Atlanta, Georgia. He delivered the Gifford Lectures at the University of Edinburgh in 1984–1985.

== Personal life ==
Moltmann was married to Elisabeth Moltmann-Wendel, who studied with him and became a notable feminist theologian. They married in 1952 and had four daughters. His wife died in 2016.

Moltmann died in Tübingen on 3 June 2024, at the age of 98.

== Theological views ==
The early Moltmann can be seen in his trilogy, Theology of Hope (1964), The Crucified God (1972), and The Church in the Power of the Spirit (1975):

- Theology of Hope was strongly influenced by the eschatological orientation of the Marxist philosopher Ernst Bloch's The Principle of Hope.
- The Crucified God posited that God died on the Cross, raising the question of the impassibility of God.
- The Church in the Power of the Spirit explores the implications of these explorations for the church in its own life and in the world.

The later Moltmann took a less systematic approach to theology, leading to what he called his "systematic contributions to theology" that sought to provoke and engage more than develop some kind of set Moltmannian theology.

Moltmann corroborated his ideas with those of Roman Catholics, Orthodox Christians, and Jews in an attempt to reach a greater understanding of Christian theology, which he believed should be developed ecumenically.

Moltmann had a passion for the Kingdom of God as it exists both in the future, and in the God of the present. His theology is often referred to as "Kingdom of God" Theology. His theology is built on eschatology, and the hope found in the resurrected Christ. This theology is most clearly explained in his book Theology of Hope.

Moltmann's theology is also seen as a theology of liberation, though not in the sense that the term is most understood. Moltmann not only viewed salvation as Christ's "preferential option for the poor," but also as offering the hope of reconciliation to the oppressors of the poor. If it were not as such, divine reconciliation would be insufficient.

=== Systematic contributions ===
Jürgen Moltmann's most significant works consist of two sets of theological work: the first is his Contributions to Systematic Theology and the second is his Original Trinity.

=== Jürgen Moltmann's original trilogy ===
- Theology of Hope (1967); Theologie der Hoffnung (1964);
- The Crucified God (1974); Der gekreuzigte Gott (1972)
- The Church in the Power of the Spirit (1975); Kirche in der Kraft des Geistes (1975)

=== Jürgen Moltmann's systematic contributions ===
- The Trinity and the Kingdom: The Doctrine of God (1981); Trinität und Reich Gottes. Zur Gotteslehre (1980)
- God in Creation: An Ecological Doctrine of Creation (1985); Gott in der Schöpfung. Ökologische Schöpfungslehre (1985)
- The Way of Jesus Christ: Christology in Messianic Dimensions (1990); Der Weg Jesu Christi. Christologie in messianischen Dimensionen (1989)
- The Spirit of Life: A Universal Affirmation (1992); Der Geist des Lebens. Eine ganzheitliche Pneumatologie (1991)
- The Coming of God: Christian Eschatology (1996) Das Kommen Gottes. Christliche Eschatologie (1995)
- Experiences in Theology: Ways and Forms of Christian Theology (2000); Erfahrungen theologischen Denkens (2000)
- Ethics of Hope (2012); Ethik der Hoffnung (2010)

=== Eschatology: theology of hope ===
Moltmann's theology of hope is a theological perspective with an eschatological foundation and focuses on the hope that the resurrection brings. Through faith we are bound to Christ, and as such have the hope of the resurrected Christ ("Praise be to the God and Father of our Lord Jesus Christ! In his great mercy he has given us new birth into a living hope through the resurrection of Jesus Christ from the dead" (1 Peter 1:3, NIV)), and knowledge of his return. For Moltmann, the hope of the Christian faith was hope in the resurrection of Christ crucified. Hope and faith depend on each other to remain true and substantial; and only with both may one find "not only a consolation in suffering, but also the protest of the divine promise against suffering".

However, because of this hope we hold, we may never exist harmoniously in a society such as ours which is based on sin. When following the theology of hope, a Christian should find hope in the future but also experience much discontentment with the way the world is now, corrupt and full of sin. Sin bases itself in hopelessness, which can take on two forms: presumption and despair. "Presumption is a premature, selfwilled anticipation of the fulfillment of what we hope for from God. Despair is the premature, arbitrary anticipation of the non-fulfillment of what we hope for from God."

In Moltmann's opinion, all should be seen from an eschatological perspective, looking toward the days when Christ will make all things new. "A proper theology would therefore have to be constructed in the light of its future goal. Eschatology should not be its end, but its beginning." This does not, as many fear, 'remove happiness from the present' by focusing all ones attention toward the hope for Christ's return. Moltmann addressed this concern as such: "Does this hope cheat man of the happiness of the present? How could it do so! For it is itself the happiness of the present." The importance of the current times is necessary for the theology of hope because it brings the future events to the here and now. This theological perspective of eschatology makes the hope of the future, the hope of today. Hope strengthens faith and aids a believer into living a life of love, and directing them toward a new creation of all things. It creates in a believer a "passion for the possible" "For our knowledge and comprehension of reality, and our reflections on it, that means at least this: that in the medium of hope our theological concepts become not judgments which nail reality down to what it is, but anticipations which show reality its prospects and its future possibilities." This passion is one that is centered around the hope of the resurrected and the returning Christ, creating a change within a believer and drives the change that a believer seeks make on the world.

For Moltmann, creation and eschatology depend on one another. There exists an ongoing process of creation, continuing creation, alongside creatio ex nihilo and the consummation of creation. The consummation of creation will consist of the eschatological transformation of this creation into the new creation. For Moltmann, the eschatological is not merely one element of Christianity, it is the key element. Founded on the resurrection, Christian theology is "at its hard core [a] theology of the cross... Conversely, the theology of the cross is the 'reverse side' of the theology of hope." Christ in this world takes the form of the cross of Christ and the sufferings of Christians, and that cross is an eschatologically open event in which the love of God for the godless is revealed. While Moltmann saw Christian hope, contained in the promise of an eschatological future, as built upon contradiction: (the crucified and risen Jesus, the cross and the resurrection, god-forsakenness and the nearness of God), it is contradiction that contains Jesus' identity within it, not above or beyond it. "The goal of history is an eschatological 'panentheism' in which God will be in everything and everything will be in God."

=== Liberation theology ===
Moltmann's liberation theology includes an understanding of both the oppressed and the oppressor as needing reconciliation. "Oppression has two sides: on one side there is the master, on the other side the slave... Oppression destroys humanity on both sides." The goal is one of mutual liberation. God's 'preferential option for the poor' should not be exclusive, but rather include the rich; insofar as God holds judgment over them also. The sufferings of the poor should not be seen as equal to or a representation of the sufferings of Jesus. Our suffering is not an offering to God, it is not required of us to suffer. The point of the crucified Christ was to present an alternative to human suffering. Human suffering is not a quality of salvation, and should not be viewed as such. This is not to say that the sufferings of humans is of no importance to God.

This "mutual liberation" necessarily involves a "liberation of oppressors from the evil they commit; otherwise there can be no liberation for a new community in justice and freedom." However, the liberation of the oppressed takes priority and must involve their own agency in order for true justice and reconciliation to be enacted: "In order to achieve this goal, the oppressed will have to free themselves from the constraints of oppression and cut themselves off from their oppressors, so as to find themselves and their own humanity. It is only after that that they can try to find a truly humane community with their previous oppressors." This seeks to avoid either the dependency of the oppressed or the co-optation of the struggles of the oppressed by the oppressor. It is with this sensibility that Moltmann explores, in his Experiences in Theology, what various liberation theologies might mean for the oppressor: Black theology for whites, Latin American liberation theology for the First World, feminist theology for men, etc. He also moves beyond oppression as a mere personal sin and instead calls for oppressors to withdraw from the "structures of violence" that destroy the lives of the oppressed.

=== Trinitarian theology ===
Moltmann stressed the perichoresis of the Father, Son, and Holy Spirit. This is to say that he believes the three dwell in one another. The three persons are differentiated in their characteristics, but related in their original exchange. Moltmann sought to defeat a monotheistic Christianity that is being used as a tool for political and clerical absolute monarchism. He believed the doctrine of the Trinity should be developed as the "true theological doctrine of freedom." He suggested that we "cease to understand God monotheistically as the one, absolute subject, but instead see him in a trinitarian sense as the unity of the Father, the Son, and the Spirit."

Moltmann related his views on the trinity to three modes of human freedom. The first mode is the political meaning of freedom as supremacy. This mode was rejected by Moltmann, who saw it as corresponding to a God who rules over his creation, which exists merely to serve Him. It is a relation of a subject with an object, where the goal is to enhance the supremacy of the subject. The second mode of human freedom is the socio-historical and Hegelian meaning of freedom as communion, which implies the relation between two subjects. This relationship aims at love and solidarity, and corresponds to the perichoresis of the Father and Son, and through the Son the children of God, or humanity. This relationship is both liberating and loving, and is one Moltmann favored. The third mode of human freedom is the implicitly religious concept of freedom as the passion of the creature for his or her potential. This deals with the relationship between subjects and their common future project. This is the mode favored most by Moltmann, who correlates this relationship with the one humans share with God in the realm of the Holy Spirit. Here, an indwelling of the Spirit allows humans to be friends with God. As you can see, the first mode of freedom is political, and focuses on The Father; the second is communal, focusing on the Son; and the third is religious, focusing on the Spirit.

== Influences ==
Upon his return to Germany in 1948, Moltmann began his course of study at Göttingen University, where he was strongly influenced by Karl Barth's dialectical theology. Moltmann grew critical of Barth's neglect of the historical nature of reality, and began to study Bonhoeffer. He developed a greater concern for social ethics, and the relationship between church and society. Moltmann also developed an interest in Luther and Hegel, the former of whose doctrine of justification and theology of the cross interested him greatly. Otto Weber was doctoral adviser to Moltmann's future wife, and at the beginning of the winter semester of 1949, Moltmann asked Weber for an idea for a doctoral thesis of his own. Weber suggested a seventeenth century Calvinist who advocated a universalism within predestination which later formed the foundation of much of Moltmann's theology. Weber remained important to Moltmann throughout his life.

Moltmann cites the English pacifist and anti-capitalist theologian Geoffrey Anketell Studdert Kennedy as being highly regarded. However the inspiration for his first major work, Theology of Hope, was the Marxist philosopher Ernst Bloch's The Principle of Hope. Bloch is concerned to establish hope as the guiding principle of his Marxism and stresses the implied humanism inherent in mystical tradition. Bloch claims to identify an atheism at the core of Christianity, embodied in the notion of the death of God and the continued imperative of seeking the Kingdom. The whole theme of the Theology of Hope was worked out in counterpoint to the theology of Wolfhart Pannenberg, who had worked alongside Moltmann at Wuppertal, and had also undergone a conversion experience during Germany's defeat in World War II. With its slogan of "History as Revelation", Pannenberg's theology has many parallels, but Moltmann was concerned to reject any notion of history as a closed system and to shift the stress from revelation to action; hope is openness to the future.

The background influence in all these thinkers is Hegel, who is referenced more times than any other writer in the Theology of Hope. Like the Left Hegelians who immediately succeeded the master, both Moltmann and Pannenberg are determined to retain the sense of history as meaningful and central to Christian discourse, while avoiding the essentially conformist and conservative aspects of his thought. In so doing, they are wrestling with the history of Germany itself. They are also implicitly offering a critique of the Neo-Orthodox theology of Karl Barth and Emil Brunner, which they see as ahistorical in its core. Moltmann writes that Barth's eschatology was at first "not unfriendly towards dynamic and cosmic perspectives" but that he then came under the influence of Plato and Kant and so "set to work in terms of the dialectic of time and eternity and came under the bane of the transcendental eschatology of Kant". The liberalism of Rudolf Bultmann is not sharply distinguished from the other dialectical theologies, since it is still focussed on an event of revelation – albeit as "an event which transposes me into a new state of my self".

While Theology of Hope was strongly influenced by the eschatological orientation of the Marxist philosopher Ernst Bloch's The Principle of Hope, in Moltmann's second major work The Crucified God, the philosophical inspiration comes from a different vein of philosophy. In "Explanation of the Theme", his introduction to the book, Moltmann acknowledges that the direction of his questioning has shifted to that of existentialist philosophy and the Marxism of the Frankfurt School. Moltmann cites Joachim Iwand, Ernst Wolf and Otto Weber as major influences on his theology as it was developing at Göttingen.

The title of Moltmann's crucial work is derived from Martin Luther, and its use marked a renewed engagement with a specifically Lutheran strain in Protestant theology, as opposed to the more Calvinist tenor of his earlier work. Moltmann's widening interest in theological perspectives from a broad cultural arena is evident in his use of the 1946 book by Kazoh Kitamori, Theology of the Pain of God, which he relates to Bonhoeffer's prison reflections. However, he footnotes Kitamori's very conservative, individualist conclusions, which he does not share. Moltmann continued to see Christ as dying in solidarity with movements of liberation, God choosing to die with the oppressed. This work and its footnotes are full of references, direct and implied, to the New Left and the uprisings of 1968, the Prague Spring the French May and, closest to home, the German APO, and their aftermath. Moltmann cited Johann and Christoph Blumhardt as a major contributors to his thought.

== Honours ==
Moltmann received honorary doctorates from a number of institutions, such as Duke University (1973), the University of Louvain in Belgium (1995), the Alexandru Ioan Cuza University in Romania (1996), the Chung Yuan Christian University in Taiwan (2002), the Nicaraguan Evangelical University (2002), and the University of Pretoria in South Africa (2017).

Moltmann received the 2000 University of Louisville and Louisville Presbyterian Theological Seminary Grawemeyer Award in Religion for his book The Coming of God: Christian Eschatology.

== Bibliography of works in English ==
=== Major works ===
- Theology of Hope: On the Ground and the Implications of a Christian Eschatology, SCM, London, 1967
- The Crucified God: The Cross of Christ As the Foundation and Criticism of Christian Theology, SCM, London, 1974
- The Church in the Power of the Spirit: A Contribution to Messianic Ecclesiology, SCM, London, 1975
- The Trinity and the Kingdom: The Doctrine of God, Harper and Row, New York, 1981
- God in Creation: An Ecological Doctrine of Creation, SCM, London, 1985
- The Way of Jesus Christ: Christology in Messianic Dimensions, SCM, London, 1990
- The Spirit of Life: A Universal Affirmation, SCM, London, 1993
- The Coming of God: Christian Eschatology, Fortress, Minneapolis, 1996
- Experiences in Theology: Ways and Forms of Christian Theology, SCM, London, 2000

=== Other works ===
Other works by Moltmann include:

- Religion, Revolution and the Future, Charles Scribner's Sons, New York, 1969
- Hope and Planning, Harper & Row, New York, 1971
- Theology of play, Harper & Row, New York, 1972
- The Gospel of Liberation, Word, Waco, Texas, 1973
- Human Identity in Christian Faith, Stanford University Press, Stanford, 1974
- Man: Christian Anthropology in the Conflicts of the Present, SPCK, London, 1974 (Reprinted as On Human Being: Christian Anthropology in the Conflicts of the Present, Fortress, Minneapolis, 2009)
- The Experiment Hope, SCM, London, 1975
- The Open Church, SCM, London, 1978 (American edition: The Passion for Life: A Messianic Lifestyle, Fortress, Philadelphia, 1978)
- Meditations on the Passion: Two Meditations on Mark 8:31–38, Paulist, New York, 1979
- The Future of Creation, SCM, London, 1979
- Experiences of God, SCM, 1980
- God–His and Hers, Crossroad, New York, 1981
- Jewish Monotheism and Christian Trinitarian Doctrine: A Dialogue by Pinchas Lapide and Jürgen Moltmann, Fortress, Philadelphia, 1981
- Following Jesus Christ in the World Today: Responsibility for the World and Christian Discipleship, Institute of Mennonite Studies, Elkhart, IN, 1983
- Humanity in God, Pilgrim, New York, 1983
- The Power of the Powerless, SCM, London, 1983
- On Human Dignity: Political Theology and Ethics, Fortress, Philadelphia, 1984
- Communities of Faith and Radical Discipleship, Mercer University Press, Macon, 1986
- Theology Today: Two Contributions Towards Making Theology Present, Trinity International, Philadelphia, 1988
- Creating a Just Future: The Politics of Peace and the Ethics of Creation in a Threatened World, Trinity International, Philadelphia, 1989
- History and the Triune God: Contributions to Trinitarian Theology, SCM, London, 1991
- Jesus Christ for Today's World, SCM, London, 1994
- Theology and the Future of the Modern World, Association of Theological Schools in the United States and Canada, Pittsburgh, PA, 1995
- The Source of Life, Fortress Press, London, 1997, ISBN 1-4514-1203-7
- A Passion for God's Reign, Eerdmans, Grand Rapids, MI, 1998
- Is There Life After Death?, Marquette University Press, Milwaukee, 1998
- Passion for God: Theology in Two Voices, Westminster John Knox, Louisville, KY, 2003
- Science and Wisdom, SCM, London, 2003
- In the End the Beginning, SCM, London, 2004
- A Broad Place: An Autobiography, Minneapolis, Fortress, 2009
- Sun of Righteousness, Arise! God's Future for Humanity and the World, Fortress, Minneapolis, 2010
- Ethics of Hope, Fortress, Minneapolis, 2012
- Jürgen Moltmann: Collected Readings, Fortress, Minneapolis, 2014
- The Living God and the Fullness of Life, Westminster John Knox, Louisville, KY, 2015
- The Spirit of Hope: Theology for a World in Peril, Westminster John Knox, Louisville, KY, 2019
- Resurrected to Eternal Life: On Dying and Rising, Fortress, Minneapolis, 2021

=== Articles and chapters ===
- "Is 'Pluralistic Theology' Useful for the Dialogue of World Religions?" in Gavin D'Costa, Christian Uniqueness Reconsidered (Maryknoll, NY: Orbis Books, 1990; pp.149–156)
- "The Passibility or Impassibility of God: Answers to J. K. Mozley's "Six Necessary Questions" in Anthony Clarke and Andrew Moore, Within the Love of God: Essays on the Doctrine of God in Honour of Paul S. Fiddes (Oxford: Oxford University Press, 2014; pp.108–119), ISBN 978-0-19-870956-5, OL 27555453M
- "Is the world unfinished? On interactions between science and theology in the concepts of nature, time and the future", Theology, vol. 114, no. 6 (Nov 2011). Boyle Lecture, with response by A. J. Torrance, doi:10.1177/0040571X11418439

== Works cited ==
- Jürgen Moltmann, "Why Am I a Christian?" in Experiences of God (Philadelphia: Fortress Press, 1980).
- Jürgen Moltmann, "An Autobiographical Note" in A. J. Conyers, God, Hope and History: Jürgen Moltmann and the Christian Concept of History (Macon, GA: Mercer University Press, 1988).
- Jürgen Moltmann, Foreword to M. Douglas Meeks, Origins of the Theology of Hope (Philadelphia: Fortress Press, 1974).
- Jürgen Moltmann, address given at Nazarene Theological Seminary, 10 December 2001.
- Jürgen Moltmann, "Stubborn Hope", interviewer Christopher A. Hall, Christianity Today, vol. 37, no. 1 (11 January 1993).
- Jurgen Moltmann: The Theology of Hope. Public Theology, 1993.
- Moltmann, Jürgen (2013). A Broad Place An Autobiography. Hymns Ancient & Modern Limited. ISBN 978-0-334-04876-3.
- Moltmann, Jürgen (1997). The Source of Life: The Holy Spirit and the Theology of Life. Fortress Press. ISBN 1-4514-1203-7.
- Kim, Nam Van (2004). A church of hope in the light of the eschatological ecclesiology of Jürgen Moltmann. DIAL (Thesis). hdl:2078.1/5397.
- Paeth, Scott (2005). "Jürgen Moltmann's Public Theology". Political Theology. 6 (2): 215–234. doi:10.1558/poth.6.2.215.65446.
- Bauckham, Richard (1997). "Moltmann's Eschatology of the Cross". Scottish Journal of Theology. 30 (4): 301–311. doi:10.1017/S0036930600026144.
- Moltmann, Jürgen (2015). The Crucified God (reprint ed.). Fortress Press. ISBN 978-1-5064-0296-3.

Academic offices
Preceded by David Daiches	Gifford Lecturer at the University of Edinburgh; 1984–1985	Succeeded by Paul Ricœur
Preceded by John Hedley Brooke	Boyle Lecturer; 2011	Succeeded by Celia Deane-Drummond
Awards
Preceded by Charles R. Marsh	Grawemeyer Award in Religion; 2000	Succeeded by James Kugel
