= Adolf Schlatter =

Swiss Lutheran theologian and professor (1852–1938)

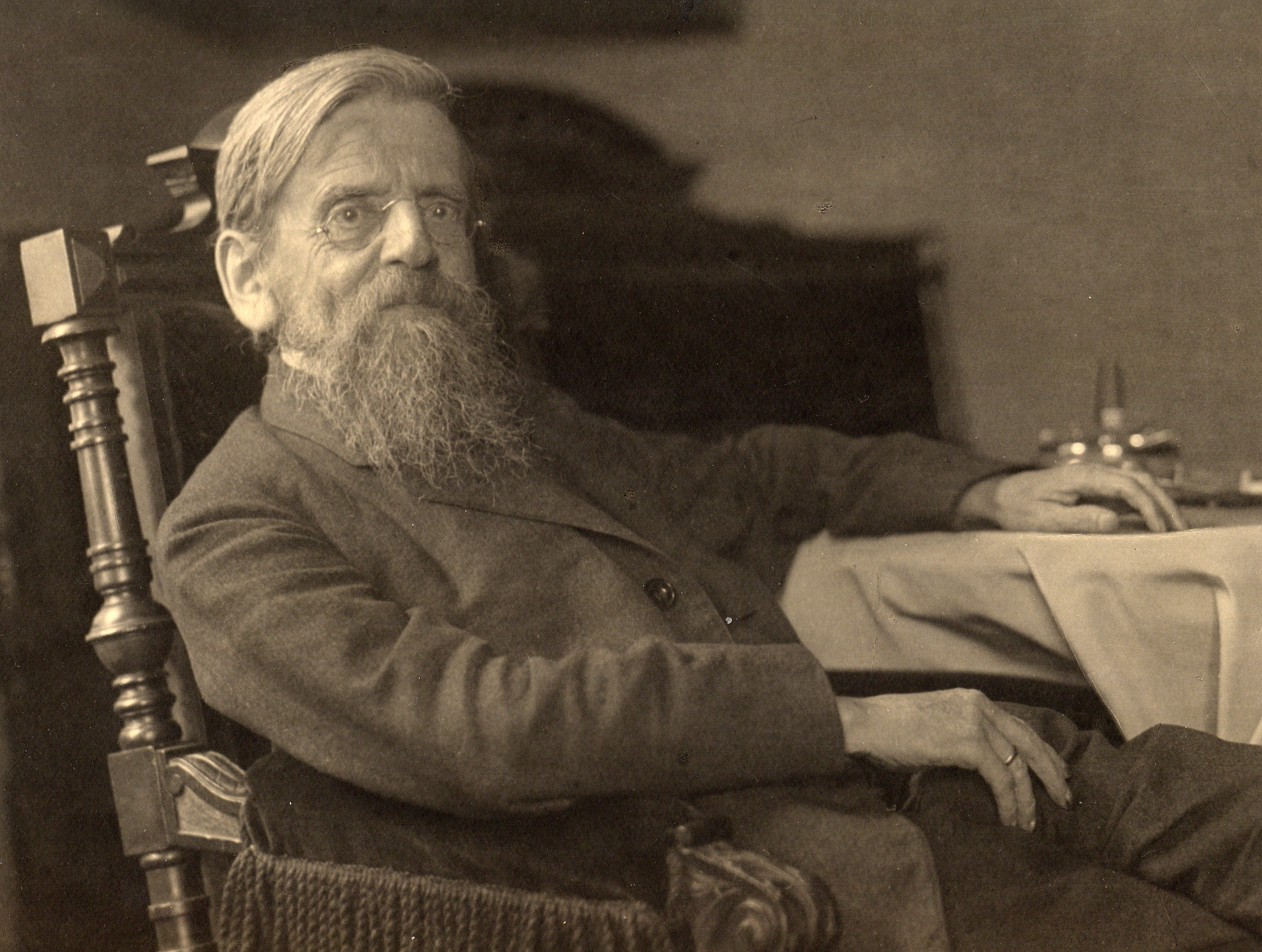
- Adolf Schlatter 1925
- Born: 16 August 1852; St. Gallen
- Died: 19 May 1938 (aged 85); Tübingen
- Occupations: Theologian and professor

Academic work
- Discipline: Biblical studies
- Sub-discipline: New Testament, systematics
- Institutions: Greifswald, Berlin, Tübingen

Adolf Schlatter (16 August 1852 – 19 May 1938) was a well-known Swiss-born German Protestant theologian and professor specialising in the New Testament and systematics at Greifswald, Berlin and Tübingen. Schlatter has published more than 400 scholarly and popular pieces during his academic career. In his work "The Nature of New Testament Theology. The Contribution of William Wrede and Adolf Schlatter", Robert Morgan writes: "Schlatter ... was considered a conservative, and is perhaps the only 'conservative' New Testament scholar since Bengel who can be rated in the same class as Baur, Wrede, Bousset and Bultmann".

== Biography ==
Schlatter, born in St. Gallen to a pietistic preacher, studied philosophy and theology in Basel and Tübingen between 1871 and 1875, gaining his post-doctoral teaching qualification (Habilitation) in 1880. The process leading up to the latter qualification was a relatively complex and dramatic phase in Schlatter's career. Significant events during this time illustrate how dominant, biased, and discriminating liberal paradigms in German universities were at the time. Robert Yarbrough explains:

"Standing between Adolf Schlatter and completion of his doctoral dissertation (Habilitation) in Bern, Switzerland, was a mountain range of unforeseeable obstacles ... Schlatter was ... shaken by the hostile reception from professor Nippold. But he was not easily deterred ... After submitting his dissertation ... Schlatter had to wait to be granted the privilege of taking an imposing battery of exams ... Since the faculty was anything but thrilled with Schlatter’s application, the exam procedure they decided on was intentionally quite strict: in addition to oral examinations in five subjects, Schlatter would have to write eight assigned essays under supervised conditions! Only if he passed all of these ‘magna cum laude’ ... would the faculty be willing to confer on him the right to lecture ... these regulations were ... never applied to anyone else after that! ... Schlatter was able to sit his exams in December 1880 ... he passed in praiseworthy fashion according to faculty resolution. His overall mark of ‘magna cum laude’ was never bested in subsequent decades ..." p. 71-84.

In 1888, he became a lecturer at the University of Berne. Between 1893 and 1930, he held professorships in Greifswald, Berlin, and Tübingen, the latter where he eventually died after a very productive and successful academic career.

Adolf Schlatter

From 1897, he was co-editor, alongside Hermann Cremer, of a magazine called Beiträge zur Förderung christlicher Theologie (Articles for the Promotion of Christian Theology).

Schlatter became particularly well known for his analysis of the New Testament, which was accessible to a broad audience. He was adamant about the manifestation of God in nature and in Jesus Christ, and this conviction led him to a criticism of the theophilosophical ideas of German idealism. His down-to-earth interpretation of the Bible also brought Schlatter into conflict with the contemporary school of thought in the Evangelical Church in Germany. In addition, Schlatter worked towards the development of a theory of knowledge with which he could reconcile his religious convictions.

Becoming professor in Berlin in the 1890s saw Schlatter became the academic "counterpart" of Adolf von Harnack. The latter in later times acknowledged Schlatter's sharp mind and penetrating ability to critique his work, even expressing sorrow when Schlatter left Berlin for Tübingen. One significant event in the Berlin years that caused great tension, not just in Berlin, but in the whole of liberal Germany is worth mentioning. Robert Yarbrough describes this event as follows:

In 1895 Adolf Schlatter took part in a Protestant convention producing a declaration decrying the overwhelming dominance of theological liberalism on theological faculties in Germany at the time. To Schlatter’s surprise a storm of protest arose among his Berlin colleagues, who felt that the declaration was damaging to the status and high honor of the professional office. Even after a lively faculty meeting, however, Schlatter could not bring himself to regret his involvement in the convention saying: ‘For me the choice stands sharply defined: God’s believing community or professional colleagues? And my decision was as clear as the choice ... faith is more than knowledge, and church more than faculty’

Schlatter had a deep impact on numerous students (see the discussion about Dietrich Bonhoeffer below). His approach to faith, science and biblical criticism was a breath of fresh air for numerous theology students, giving them hope in an otherwise anti-supernatural intellectual environment, where all that remained of the New Testament was a "historical Jesus" offering the highest moral ideals for society.

=== Schlatter, Nazism and anti-Semitism ===
According to historian Saul Friedländer in his Nazi Germany and the Jews 1939-1945, Schlatter belonged to a "hard core of Jew haters" who considered the Nazi anti-Semitic laws too mild. Friedländer claims that the latter comes from a popular 1935 pamphlet by Schlatter, Wird der Jude über uns siegen? Ein Wort für die Weihnacht [Will the Jew be Victorious Over Us?: A Word for Christmas] that regrets the "favorable situation" of the Jews in contemporary Germany.

Though his advocates are correct in arguing that Schlatter was confronting Nazi racism, what in fact Schlatter did was employ a widespread anti-regime polemic finding currency at the time: the “Nazi as Jew” concept. According to Stephen Haynes, “If a dominant characteristic of interwar religious discourse was its penchant for stigmatizing the Nazi enemy with a ‘Jewish’ stain, then anti-Nazi authors knew instinctively that jewifying National Socialism would strengthen their case with the average German.” Schlatter's tract firmly situates him in the anti-Jewish spirit of the period, and on pp. 14–15 his key point was clear: the Jewish priests’ and teachers’ national selfishness (nationalen Eigensucht) was no different from those who knew nothing higher than the racial soul; for both thought in a fashion that was completely Jewish (vollständig jüdisch). The Gestapo certainly sought to confiscate any material that would equate the regime with the Jews. A careful reading within historical context shows that Schlatter's final work Do We Know Jesus? works within this same framework of paralleling Jesus's and the disciples’ struggles with the Jews to the church's struggle with Nazism.

In 2012, James E. McNutt published his understanding of the manner in which Schlatter's criticism of Nazism functioned in tandem with his views of the Jewish people.

Coming to an "objective" understanding of Schlatter's view of the Jews, the Nazi Party and Hitler himself, continues to be discussed and researched by many. Two factors that have not received enough attention in these discussions are:

1. Schlatter was more than 80 years old when the Nazi party took power. He was an old man in the final stages of his life. Despite this, he did what almost none of his more "liberal" colleagues in i.e. Berlin did: he openly criticized the Reich. Although of advanced age, Schlatter's mind and energy peaked during the 1930s, witnessed to by the publication of his magisterial Gottes Gerechtigkeit - a classic commentary on Paul's Romans letter. Despite his criticism of the regime Schlatter's attitude toward aspects of Nazi ideology remain ambivalent. To many of his contemporaries he problematically embraced views held by the German Christians who identified their faith as one with the goals of the Reich. Weeks after the Jewish boycott of early April 1933, Schlatter could attach his signature to a public statement affirming: "We are full of gratitude to God, that he as the Lord of History has given our people in Adolf Hitler the Fuehrer and deliverer from deep trouble." Schlatter refused to denounce the "Aryan paragraph" which would remove Protestant clergy of Jewish descent from their pulpits, stating that: "At this time, fellowship with the compatriots (Volksgenossen) is more important than fellowship with Jewish Christians." Furthermore, as Werner Neuer has pointed out Schlatter refused to sign the Barmen Declaration of the Confessing Church in 1934, since to embrace God's revelation apart from the Volk would force him to “close his Bible and separate his faith from his very being".
2. According to Martin Rumscheidt, Dietrich Bonhoeffer, later executed for his involvement in trying to assassinate Hitler, was greatly inspired by Schlatter:
  Schlatter provided a perspective on ‘the world’ which later sustained Bonhoeffer's theology of the world. Schlatter also conveyed a sense of the ‘authority’ of Scripture which diverged significantly from the prevailing liberal-Protestant view of the Bible as a ‘source-book for religious ideas’ to be found not in but behind the text ... one must recognise it also in Bonhoeffer's later life, where it appears at the heart of his faith that results from having been captivated and convinced by the word of Jesus ... it was the Reformed professor of New Testament who implanted it in the young student to the extent that it became an essential part of Bonhoeffer's epistemology and, finally, of his whole theological existence. Indeed, it was Schlatter's approach to the Scriptures which ... shaped Bonhoeffer's critique of Bultmann's programme of ‘demythologisation’ in his prison letters.
  Bonhoeffer's admiration, however, diminished in 1933, following Schlatter's scathing critique of Bonhoeffer's early draft of what eventually would become the "Bethel Confession." Contrary to Bonhoeffer's wishes, church leaders submitted the draft for review by some twenty experts throughout Germany including Adolf Schlatter. Schlatter rejected the draft due to what he saw as an illegitimate separation of the confessions from a distinct German expression. He published the seminal points of his rejection in a pamphlet entitled “The New German Character in the Church.” ( Die neue deutsche Art in der Kirche (Bethel: Verlagshandlung der Anstalt Bethel, 1933). Attitudes such as Schlatter's led Bonhoeffer to quit the project, and he voiced his frustration later by asserting: “We will have to be very much on our guard against letting the struggle get us entangled in false questions and false themes. I need only recall theological writings of the last two years – and from our side too! - Althaus’s German Hour of the Church, Heim, even Schlatter, The New German Characteristics in the Church – to make my point.” However, Schlatter's constant critique of the Nazi view of man, and the dangerous route taken by Hitler and the Reich provides a counterbalance to the later critique of Bonhoeffer. Also to be remembered is that Schlatter never propagated physical harm to the Jewish people.

Primary source research reveals Schlatter's close personal and professional relationship to Gerhard Kittel, whose anti-Semitic publications forced his removal from his teaching position following the war. Schlatter's daughter testified that Kittel and her father worked closely together in reading and editing each other's work, and despite differences with regard to aspects of Nazi policy, Schlatter “accompanied Professor Kittel on the road that he had to walk, up to the very last days before his death in May 1938.” Overlooked in Werner Neuer's biography is the fact that while actively involved in Walter Frank's antisemitic Reichsinstitut, producing work supporting Nazi propaganda, Kittel was invited to be the memorial speaker at Schlatter's funeral.

Archives of Schlatter's work, as well as a foundation dedicated to him, are situated in Stuttgart. In Tübingen, the "Adolf Schlatter House" in Österbergstrasse is named after him, as is the "Adolf Schlatter Home" in Recke.

== Selected works ==
=== Books ===
- Schlatter, Adolf (1897). Der Dienst der Christen in der älteren Dogmatik. Berlin. - (republished as Der Dienst des Christen in 1999)
- ——— (1897). Die Tage Trajans und Hadrians. Gütersloh: C. Bertelsmann.
- ——— (1913). Die hebräischen Namen bei Josephus. Gütersloh: C. Bertelsmann.
- ——— (1917). Die Gründe der christlicher Gewißheit. Berlin: Calwer Vereinsbuchhandlung.
- ——— (1918). Haering, Theodor von. Stuttgart: Verlag J. F. Steinkopf.
- ——— (1921). Die Geschichte des Christus. Stuttgart.
- ——— (1932). Evangelium und Dienst am Volk. Gotha.
- ——— (1932). Der Brief des Jakobus. Berlin: Calwer Vereinsbuchhandlung.
- ——— (1934). Am Leiden teilnehmen. Berlin.
- ——— (1935). Gottes Gerechtigkeit: ein Kommentar zum Römerbrief. Stuttgart.
- ——— (1961). Die Apostelgeschichte. Berlin.
- ——— (1962). Die Briefe an die Galater, Epheser, Kolosser und Philemon. EzNT. Vol. 7. Berlin.
- ——— (1965). Die Briefe des Petrus, Judas, Jakobus, der Brief an die Hebräer. EzNT. Vol. 9. Berlin.

=== Journal articles ===
- ——— (1896). "Einige Ergebnisse aus Niese's Ausgabe des Josephus". Zeitschrift des Deutschen Palästina-Vereins. 19: 221–31.

== Feschriften ==
- Vom Dienst an Theologie und Kirche : Festgabe für Adolf Schlatter zum 75. Geburtstag 16. August 1927. Berlin: (Furche-Verlag. OCLC 731247894.
