= Hans Iwand =

German Protestant theologian

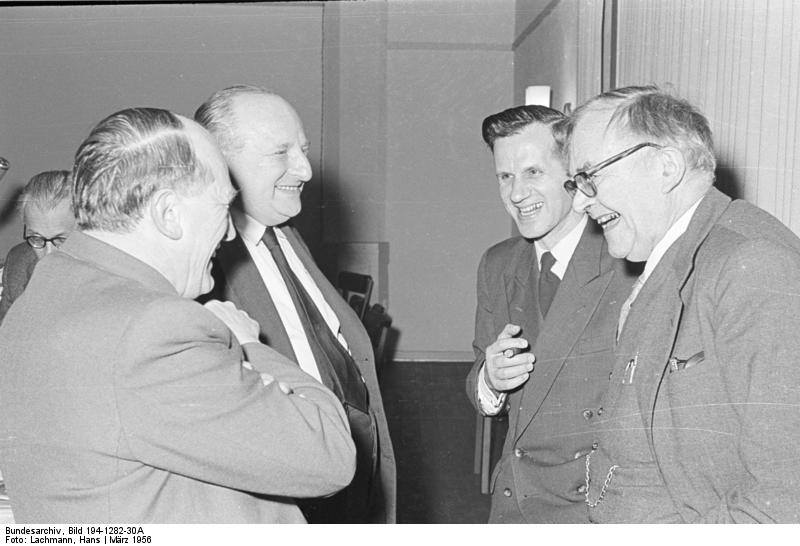
- Left to right at a 1956 Evangelical Lutheran Church annual meeting in Wuppertal are Upper Church Councillor (Oberkirchenrat) Joachim Beckmann (1901–1987), Hans Iwand, German theologian Wilhelm Schneemelcher (1914–2003), and Swiss theologian Karl Barth (1886–1968).
- Born: Hans Joachim Iwand; 11 July 1899; Schreibendorf, Silesia
- Died: 2 May 1960 (aged 60); Bonn, North Rhine-Westphalia, Germany
- Occupation: Lutheran theologian
- Spouse: Ilse Ehrhardt (m. 1927)
- Children: 5

Hans Joachim Iwand (German: [hans ˈjoːaxɪm ˈʔiːvant]; 11 July 1899 – 2 May 1960) was a German Lutheran theologian. Iwand's thought was considerably influenced by Karl Barth.

== Early life ==
After finishing high school in 1917 in Görlitz, Iwand studied Protestant theology at the University of Breslau (modern Wrocław, Poland). A year later, towards the end of World War I, he was drafted for military service. After the war, he was stationed for six months on the Silesian border before continuing his studies in Breslau and studying for two semesters at University of Halle-Wittenberg in Halle. His teachers were Erich Schaeder (1861–1936), Hans von Soden (1881–1945), and Rudolf Hermann (1887–1962). After graduating in 1923 he was superintendent of studies at the Lutherheim in Königsberg (now Kaliningrad) in East Prussia. Iwand earned his doctorate in 1924 and his habilitation in 1927, and he took his second theological examination in 1928. From 1927 to 1934 he was a privatdozent (associate professor) at the University of Königsberg.

== Family ==
Iwand was born in Schreibendorf, Silesia, German Empire (modern Pisary, Lower Silesian Voivodeship), the son of pastor Otto Iwand and his wife Lydia née Herrmann. In 1927 Hans married Ilse Ehrhardt; the couple had five children. Hans Iwand is buried in the village of Beienrode, Königslutter.

Iwand's youngest daughter, the Veronika Geyer-Iwand (1943-1997), a popular religion teacher and the mayor of Beienrode, married pastor Klaus Geyer (1941-2003). The son-in-law was convicted in 1998 of manslaughter in her brutal murder (July 25, 1997); Geyer was the only German theologian ever to have been jailed after committing such a crime.

== Nazi period ==
In November 1934 Iwand became professor of New Testament studies at the Herder Institute in Riga, Latvia. Because of his participation in the Kirchenkampf struggle between the Nazi-backed so-called Deutsche Christen church and its oppositional Bekennende Kirche ("confessing church") he was forced out of his teaching position and from 1935 to 1937 headed illegal seminaries for training pastors in Blöstau, East Prussia (modern Vishniovka, Guryevsk, in the Kaliningrad enclave of Russia) and Jordan, Brandenburg (now in Poland). In 1936 a Reichsredeverbot (prohibition of speech, i.e. a gag order) was imposed on him. Following the closure of these eastern seminaries he opened another one in January 1938 in Dortmund, an act for which he was imprisoned for four months. Upon his release he took over the parish of the Marienkirche, Dortmund, where he remained until the war ended.

== Professorship in Göttingen and Bonn ==
After World War II, Iwand was professor of systematic theology at the University of Göttingen, where he worked closely with Ernst Wolf. He was also at this time a council member of the Evangelical Church in Germany and the principal author of Darmstädter Wort zum politischen Weg unseres Volkes, a statement on relations between church and state after the end of Nazism and during the tensions of the Cold War.

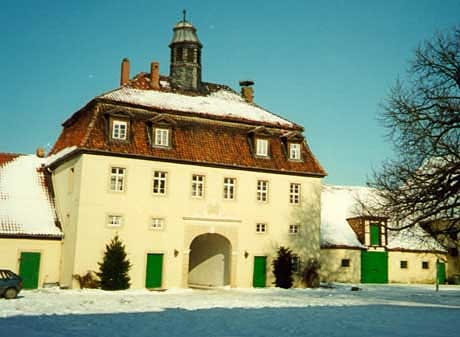
Beienrode seniors facility, formerly the Haus der helfenden Hände.

In 1952 he moved to the University of Bonn, where he remained until his death. In Beienrode he founded the Haus der helfenden Hände ("house of helping hands") to ease the plight of refugees from the former East Germany, later working for mutual understanding among Germans and the peoples of Eastern Europe. The building is now used as a care facility for 80 senior citizens. His archived documents from this time are now kept in the German Federal Archives in Koblenz.

In 1956 he was co-founder of the German social democratic publication Blätter für deutsche und internationale Politik, a monthly magazine covering German and international politics, and in 1958, together with Werner Schmauch (1905–1964) and Czech theologian Josef Hromádka (1889–1969), Iwand was a co-founder of the Christliche Friedenskonferenz (Christian Peace Conference) in Prague.

== Teachings ==
Following Luther, Iwand's central starting point was: "How far can man 'decide' when it comes to the question of God?" [2, p. 295], under the constraints of human volition. Iwand believed: "Jesus Christ cannot be known as a saviour and redeemer without the spirit of God, who glorified him to us." [Ibid.] Therewith, however, the possibility of people's free choice of the people is removed, as both ideas "cannot stand on a single board." This position has far-reaching consequences. For Iwand it concerns God-given "true faith", a correct understanding of law and gospel, sin and grace, faith and works, and God's righteousness. "Gospel" is "God's grace today", while the primary function of "law" is to highlight sin. Christ is "life itself", the fulfilment of what the law commands, and the relationship of faith and works is that while man can do good, he is not himself good. Iwand here refers to the basic Protestant Reformation positions Sola fide and Sola gratia. The Reformation view is that man is justified not through works but by faith alone.

Besides the efficacy of the God's word, there is also the certainty of faith. The truth of God is more certain than life and all experience [3, p. 316]. The believer sees in Scripture the clarity of God himself, "which the face of Jesus Christ reflects" [3, p. 318]. All the mysteries of the immanent God "lose their stings when we read between the lines to cognize God through the face of Jesus Christ, who through suffering and death has redeemed us to the eternal counsel of his father" [3, p. 303]. Iwand inspired and later edited the much-used Göttinger Predigtmeditationen ("Göttingen sermon meditations"). Reflecting on God's word is the focus here. "We must with our work assist all those who now are knocking where once, by the grace of God, it will be opened, as the promise was given to us. The letter of Scripture is, naturally, this place where we should and must knock" [5, p. 94], as Iwand wrote in an early foreword.

== Works ==
- 1924: Über die methodische Verwendung von Antinomien in der Religionsphilosophie ("On the methodical use of antinomies in the philosophy of religion"), unpublished first dissertation
- 1930: Rechtfertigungslehre und Christusglaube: eine Untersuchung zur Systematik der Rechtfertigungslehre Luthers in ihren Anfängen ("Doctrine of justification and faith in Christ: an investigation of the original systematics of Luther's doctrine of justification"), habilitation thesis
- 1939: Theologische Erläuterungen ("Theological explanations") for Martin Luther's Vom unfreien Willen (On the Bondage of the Will), Christian Kaiser Verlag, Munich, pp. 289–371
- 1941: Glaubensgerechtigkeit nach Luthers Lehre ("Luther's doctrine of justification by faith"), in Theologische Existenz heute, Issue 75, translated to English as The Righteousness of Faith According to Luther, Randi H. Lundell, trans.; Virgil F. Thompson, ed. June 2008. Wipf & Stock, 105 pages. ISBN 155635911X
- 1956: Vom Primat der Christologie ("On the primacy of Christology"), in Antwort, a Festschrift in honour of Karl Barth, pp. 172–189
- 1959: Um den rechten Glauben. Gesammelte Aufsätze ("Concerning true faith"). Collected essays edited by Karl Gerhard Steck
- 1963: Predigt-Meditationen ("Sermon meditations"), V & R, Göttingen

Posthumous Works (1962 to 1967)

Edited by Helmut Gollwitzer, Walter Kreck, Karl Gerhard Steck and Ernst Wolf, 6 volumes, Munich

- Vol. 1: Glauben und Wissen ("Knowledge and Belief", 1962), 315 pp. ISBN 3-579-01669-5
- Vol. 2: Vorträge und Aufsätze ("Lectures and essays", 1966), 404 pp. ISBN 3-579-01670-9
- Vol. 3: Ausgewählte Predigten ("Selected sermons", 1967), 309 pp. ISBN 3-579-01671-7
- Vol. 4: Gesetz und Evangelium ("Law and gospel" [lecture], 1964), 456 pp. ISBN 3-579-01672-5
- Vol. 5: Luthers Theologie ("Luther's theology [lecture], 1964), 320 pp. ISBN 3-579-01673-3
- Vol. 6: Briefe an Rudolf Hermann ("Letters to Rudolf Hermann", edited by Karl Gerhard Steck, 1964), 356 pp. ISBN 3-579-01674-1

Posthumous Works (New series, 1998 to 2004)

Edited by Hans-Iwand-Stiftung, 4 volumes, Gütersloh: Kaiser, Gütersloher Verl.-Haus

- Vol. 1: Kirche und Gesellschaft ("Church and society", 1998), 349 pp. ISBN 3-579-01845-0
- Vol. 2: Christologie. Die Umkehrung des Menschen zur Menschlichkeit ("Christology: the return of man to humanity", 1999), 539 pp. ISBN 3-579-01846-9
- Vol. 3: Theologiegeschichte des 19. und 20. Jahrhunderts: Väter und Söhne ("Theological history of the 19th and 20th centuries: Fathers and sons", 2001), 560 pp. ISBN 3-579-01847-7
- Vol. 4 (not yet published; intended to contain Hans Iwand's letters)
- Vol. 5: Predigten und Predigtlehre ("Sermons and preaching doctrine", 2004), 567 pp. ISBN 3-579-01849-3

== Bibliography ==
- Werner Führer: "Iwand, Hans Joachim," in: Biographisch-Bibliographisches Kirchenlexikon (BBKL). Vo. 14. Bautz, Herzberg 1998, pp. 1101–1104. ISBN 3-88309-073-5
- Carl-Jürgen Kaltenborn: Hans Joachim Iwand. Union, Berlin 1971.
- Manfred Koschorke, ed.: Allein das Wort hat's getan: Geschichte der Bekennenden Kirche in Ostpreußen 1933–1945 ("The word alone did it: History of the Confessing Church in East Prussia from 1933 to 1945"). Vandenhoeck & Ruprecht, Göttingen 1976, ISBN 3-525-55355-2
- Hermann Dembrowski: "H. J. Iwand (1899 - 1960)" in Dietrich Rauschning, Donata v. Nereé (eds.): Die Albertus-Universität zu Königsberg und ihre Professoren ("The Albertus University of Königsberg and their professors"). Duncker & Humblot, Berlin 1995, ISBN 3-428-08546-9 (Jahrbuch der Albertus-Universität zu Königsberg, Vol. 29, 1994, ISSN 0075-2177), pp. 811–825
- Ernst Burdach: Hans Joachim Iwand: Theologie zwischen den Zeiten ("Hans Joachim Iwand. Theology between the times"). Fragment, 1899–1937. Gütersloh 1999
- Jürgen Seim: Hans Joachim Iwand: Eine Biografie ("Hans Joachim Iwand: a biography"). Gütersloh 1999, ISBN 3-579-01844-2
- Ralph Meier: Gesetz und Evangelium bei Hans Joachim Iwand ("Law and gospel with Hans Joachim Iwand"). Göttingen: Vandenhoeck & Ruprecht, 1997, 310 pp. ISBN 352556287X
- Gerard den Hertog: Bevrijdende kennis over "de leer van de onvrije wil" in de theologie van Hans Joachim Iwand. 's-Gravenhage, 1989.
- Bertold Klappert, Manfred Schulze, eds.: Aus der Umkehr leben: Hans Joachim Iwand 1899–1999. Wuppertal 2001
- Frank Pritzke: Rechtfertigungslehre und Christologie. Eine Untersuchung zu ihrem Zusammenhang in der dogmatischen und homiletischen Arbeit und in den Predigten des jungen Iwand ("Doctrine of justification and Christology: A study of their relationship in the dogmatic and homiletic work and in the sermons of the younger Iwand"). Göttingen 2002.
- Norbert Schwarz: Denn wenn ich schwach bin, bin ich stark: Rezeptivität und Produktivität des Glaubenssubjektes in der Homiletik Hans Joachim Iwands ("For when I am weak, I am strong: receptivity and productivity of faith topics in the homiletics of Hans Joachim Iwand"). Göttingen: Vandenhoeck & Ruprecht, 2008, 360 pp. ISBN 3525624069
- Byung-Yong Suh: Lex Spiritualis. Iwands Verständnis des Gebotes im Gespräch mit Luther, Calvin und Barth (Lex Spiritualis. Iwands Understanding of the Law in Dialogue with Luther, Calvin and Barth). Seoul 2006.
