= Hermann Cremer =

German theologian

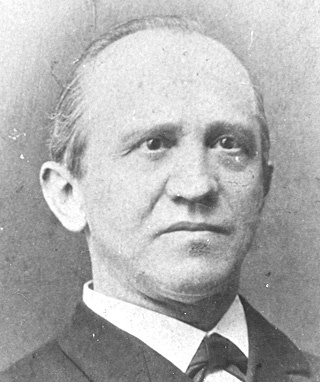
- Born: 18 October 1834; Unna, Westphalia
- Died: 4 October 1903 (aged 68)
- Education: University of Halle & University of Tübingen
- Occupation(s): pastor, professor and theologian

August Hermann Cremer (18 October 1834, in Unna, Westphalia – 4 October 1903) was a German Protestant theologian. He was considered head of the so-called Greifswalder Schule at the University of Greifswald.

He studied theology in Halle under Friedrich August Tholuck and at Tübingen as a pupil of Johann Tobias Beck. From 1859 he served as pastor in Ostönnen (today part of the city of Soest), and in 1870 was appointed professor of systematic theology at the University of Greifswald.

Cremer was the author of a biblico-theological lexicon of New Testament Greek, titled Biblisch-theologisches Wörterbuch der neutestamentlichen Gräcität. This work was published over several editions and also translated into English as Biblico-theological lexicon of New Testament Greek (1895). Another significant work was a book on the Pauline Doctrine of Justification called Paulinische Rechtfertigungslehre im Zusammenhange ihrer geschichtlichen Voraussetzungen (1899). In 1897, with Adolf Schlatter (1852-1938), he founded the magazine Beiträge zur Förderung christlicher Theologie ("Articles for the Promotion of Christian Theology").
