= Otto Weber (theologian) =

German theologian

Otto Weber (German: [ˈveːbɐ]; 4 June 1902 – 19 October 1966) was a German theologian.

== Biography ==
Weber was born in Mülheim, and studied at Bonn and Tübingen. In 1933, he joined the Nazi Party and was for a short time a member of the German Christians group. In 1934, Weber became professor at the University of Göttingen.

He opposed the witness of the Confessing Church, and after the war felt a strong sense of guilt for his involvement with Nazi Germany. His 1955 work, The Foundations of Dogmatics is one of the most influential Reformed theological works of the twentieth century. Jürgen Moltmann describes him as an "expert teacher" and a "compelling preacher".

Weber died in St. Moritz.
