= Resident Alien =

Resident Alien may refer to:

- Resident alien, a non-citizen living in a country
- Resident Alien (album), a 1995 album by Spacehog
- Resident Alien (comics), a 2012 comic book series by Peter Hogan and Steve Parkhouse
  - Resident Alien (TV series), a 2021 TV series based on the comic book series
- Resident Alien (film), a 1990 documentary film

== See also ==
- Resident Aliens, a 1989 book by Stanley Hauerwas and William Willimon
