= H. Richard Niebuhr =

American theological ethicist (1894–1962)

The Reverend H. Richard Niebuhr
- Born: Helmut Richard Niebuhr; September 3, 1894; Wright City, Missouri, U.S.
- Died: July 5, 1962 (aged 67); Greenfield, Massachusetts, U.S.
- Spouse: Florence Mittendorff (m. 1920)
- Relatives: Reinhold Niebuhr (brother)

Ecclesiastical career
- Religion: Christianity (Protestant)
- Church: Evangelical Synod of North America
- Ordained: 1916

Academic background
- Education: Elmhurst College; Eden Theological Seminary; Washington University in St. Louis; Yale University
- Thesis: Ernst Troeltsch's Philosophy of Religion (1924)
- Doctoral advisor: Douglas Clyde Macintosh
- Influences: Karl Barth; Jonathan Edwards; Søren Kierkegaard; F. D. Maurice; George Herbert Mead; Josiah Royce; Paul Tillich; Ernst Troeltsch

Academic work
- Discipline: Theology; philosophy
- Sub-discipline: Ethics
- School or tradition: Neo-orthodoxy
- Institutions: Eden Theological Seminary; Elmhurst College; Yale University
- Doctoral students: Hans Frei; Van A. Harvey; Rachel Henderlite; Thomas C. Oden
- Notable students: Sallie McFague
- Notable works: Christ and Culture (1951); The Responsible Self (1963)
- Influenced: James W. Fowler; James Gustafson; Stanley Hauerwas; Gordon Kaufman

Helmut Richard Niebuhr (/ˈniːbʊər/; September 3, 1894 – July 5, 1962) was an American theologian and Protestant minister who is considered one of the most important Christian ethicists in 20th-century America. He is best known for his 1951 book Christ and Culture and his posthumously published book The Responsible Self. The younger brother of theologian Reinhold Niebuhr, Richard Niebuhr taught for several decades at the Yale Divinity School. Both brothers were, in their day, important figures in the neo-orthodox theological school within American Protestantism. His theology (together with that of his colleague at Yale, Hans Wilhelm Frei) has been one of the main sources of postliberal theology, sometimes called the "Yale school". He influenced such figures as James Gustafson, Stanley Hauerwas, and Gordon Kaufman.

== Life ==
Niebuhr was born on September 3, 1894, in Wright City, Missouri, the son of Gustav Niebuhr, a minister in the Evangelical Synod of North America. His family moved to Lincoln, Illinois, in 1902. He graduated from Elmhurst College in 1912, and Eden Theological Seminary in 1915. He would later obtain a master's degree from Washington University in St. Louis in 1918. He completed his Doctor of Philosophy degree from Yale University in 1924.

He started his working career as a reporter in Lincoln in 1915 and 1916. He was ordained a minister in the Evangelical Synod in 1916. He served with that body in St. Louis, Missouri, through 1918. (The synod merged in 1934 with the German Reformed Church in the United States; the subsequently formed Evangelical and Reformed Church united in 1957 with the Congregational Christian Churches to form the United Church of Christ.)

During WWI he and his family supported the War Welfare Commission of the Evangelical Synod; he also started preaching his sermons in English, instead of German.

In 1924 he became president of Elmhurst College and began modernising the curriculum.

While living in St. Louis, he was a member and leader in Evangelical United Church of Christ in Webster Groves, Missouri, and taught at Eden Theological Seminary from 1919 to 1924 and from 1927 to 1931. Between 1924 and 1927, he was the President of Elmhurst College. He taught at Yale from 1931 to 1962, specializing in theology and Christian ethics.

Niebuhr died on July 5, 1962, in Greenfield, Massachusetts.

== Teachings ==
Niebuhr was concerned throughout his life with the absolute sovereignty of God and the issue of historical relativism. He considered Karl Barth and Ernst Troeltsch to be his main influences. He accepted from Barth and neo-orthodoxy the absolute transcendence of God. He believed that God is above history, that he makes commands upon human beings, and that all history is under the control of this God. Niebuhr borrowed often from Paul Tillich's notion of God. He was comfortable describing God as Being-itself, the One, or the Ground of Being. In this regard, Niebuhr held something of a middle ground between the dogmatic but dialectical theology of Karl Barth and the philosophically oriented modified liberalism of Paul Tillich.

Niebuhr was also concerned with historical relativism. While God may be absolute and transcendent, human beings are not. Humans are a part of the flux and movement of the world. Because of this, how God is comprehended is never permanent. God is always understood differently by people at different times in history and in different social locations. Niebuhr's theology shows great sensitivity to how expressions of faith differ from one religious community to another. His thought in some respects anticipated latter-day liberal Protestant concerns about pluralism and tolerance. However, in The Kingdom of God in America (1937), he also criticized the then-liberal social gospel, describing its message as, "A God without wrath brought men without sin into a kingdom without judgment through the ministrations of a Christ without a cross."

Niebuhr was, by training, a Christian ethicist. In this capacity, his biggest concern was how human beings relate to God, to each other, to their communities, and to the world. Niebuhr's theological ethics can be described, roughly, as relational. His greatest ethical treatise was The Responsible Self, published shortly after his death. It was intended to be the prologue of a much larger book on ethics. His sudden death prevented his writing this work. In The Responsible Self, Niebuhr dealt with human beings as responding agents. Human beings are always "in response" to some influence, whether another human being, a community, the natural order or history, or, above all, God.

=== Christ and Culture ===
His most famous work is Christ and Culture. It is often referenced in discussions and writings on a Christian's response to the world's culture. In the book, Niebuhr gives a history of how Christianity has responded to culture. He outlines five prevalent viewpoints:

- Christ against culture
- Christ of culture
- Christ above culture
- Christ and culture in paradox
- Christ transforming culture

== Works ==
- The Social Sources of Denominationalism (1922, 1929)
- The Church Against the World (1935) (contributor)
- The Kingdom of God in America (1937)
- The Meaning of Revelation (1941)
- Christ and Culture (1951)
- The Purpose of the Church and Its Ministry (1956)
- Radical Monotheism and Western Culture (1960)
- The Responsible Self (1963)
- Faith on Earth: An Inquiry into the Structure of Human Faith (1989).

== Translation ==
- Paul Tillich, Die religiöse Lage der Gegenwart (Berlin: Ullstein 1926), as The Religious Situation (New York: Henry Holt & Co. 1932; reprint: Meridian Books, New York 1956).

== Family ==
- His brother Reinhold taught at Union Theological Seminary and wrote the Serenity Prayer.
- His sister Hulda taught at Boston University and was the first woman professor at McCormick Seminary.
- His son Richard Reinhold Niebuhr taught at Harvard Divinity School and wrote several books.
- His grandson Gustav Niebuhr was a journalist and professor at Syracuse University.

== Honors ==
Elmhurst University established the Niebuhr Medal to honor him and his brother.

A historical marker for the family was created in South Maple Street, Lincoln in 2001.
