= Willimon =

Willimon is a surname. Notable people with the surname include:

- Beau Willimon (born 1977), American playwright and screenwriter
- William Henry Willimon (born 1946), American theologian
