= Bruce D. Marshall =

American Catholic theologian (born 1955)

- Born: October 31, 1955
- Spouse: Sandy Marshall
- Awards: Veritas Medal (2020)

Academic background
- Education: Northwestern University; Yale University
- Doctoral advisor: George Lindbeck
- Influences: Thomas Aquinas; Karl Barth; Donald Davidson; Matthias Joseph Scheeben; Willard Van Orman Quine; Ludwig Wittgenstein; John Duns Scotus; George Lindbeck

Academic work
- Discipline: Theology
- Institutions: St. Olaf College, Southern Methodist University
- Notable works: Trinity and Truth (2000)

Bruce D. Marshall (born 1955) is an American Catholic theologian and retired Lehman Professor of Christian Doctrine at Southern Methodist University. His work focuses primarily on Trinitarian theology, Christology, the relation of philosophy and theology, and the links shared between Judaism and Christianity.

== Biography ==
Marshall became a Christian while a student at Northwestern University. As a newly baptized Lutheran, his interest in Christian doctrine and theology eventually led him to Yale Divinity School where he met his wife, Sandy. After graduating from Yale and teaching for many years at St. Olaf College and Southern Methodist University, in 2005, Marshall converted to Roman Catholicism - a decision fostered in part by the success of the Lutheran-Catholic dialogues taking place at the time.

Bruce and Sandy have one daughter and reside in Dallas, Texas.

== Education and career ==
Marshall graduated with a Bachelor of Arts degree from Northwestern University in 1977 before earning a Master of Arts in religion in 1979 and Doctorate of Philosophy in 1985 from Yale University. While at Yale he wrote his dissertation under George Lindbeck. Upon completion of his PhD, Marshall took a post as assistant professor of theology at St. Olaf College. After reaching the ranks of associate and full professor, Marshall joined the faculty of Southern Methodist University where he served as Lehman Professor of Christian Doctrine until his retirement in May 2026. He has served as a scholar-in-residence at Providence College, and the Pontifical Academy of Saint Thomas Aquinas in Rome, and the Dominican House of Studies in Washington DC.

== Theology ==
A former student of George Lindbeck, Marshall was influential in the shaping the conversation regarding the postliberal school (a.k.a., the Yale school) of theology. Lindbeck credited Marshall with helping him better understand his own landmark work, The Nature of Doctrine.

Marshall has since written on numerous topics within Christian theology, though his work focuses primarily on the doctrine of the Trinity, Christology, sacramental theology, the relation of philosophy and theology, and the links shared between Judaism and Christianity. A recurrent feature of all Marshall's theological work, however, is a manifest commitment to the epistemic primacy of Christ.

== Reception ==
Marshall's work has been celebrated among Protestant and Catholic theologians, resulting in a festschrift entitled Love Become Incarnate (2023). Stanley Hauerwas described Marshall "a scholar's scholar, a theologian's theologian." Khaled Anatolios has remarked that "Bruce Marshall surely stands in the front rank of contemporary Catholic theology. The profundity, rigor, range, and clarity of his theological work, inspired by a governing vision of the absolute primacy of Christ, constitute a legacy that will inspire and engage serious theologians for many years to come." Boyd Taylor Coolman has similarly expressed, "Bruce Marshall is a theologian of the highest caliber, of remarkable depth and breadth, of historical sources and of systematic coherence, of scientific rigor and sapiential insight, of Scripture and philosophy, of Israel and Church, of faith and reason, of love and knowledge." The late Geoffrey Wainwright called Marshall's Trinity and Truth "remarkable," and Paul J. Griffiths proclaimed it "a splendid example of how Christians should think about philosophical questions." The journal Modern Theology published an entire symposium based on Marshall's book Trinity and Truth. Similarly, the journal Pro Ecclesia published a symposium in which Marshall's assessment of the theology of Karl Barth anchored the conversation.

In recognition of his contributions to Catholic theology, Marshall was awarded the Vertias Medal from the Aquinas Center for Theological Renewal at Ave Maria University in 2020. Marshall is a member of the Academy of Catholic Theology and served as its president in 2008–2009. He serves on the editorial board of Nova et Vetera (English edition) and Pro Ecclesia, is a frequently requested speaker of the Thomistic Institute, and is both a National Endowment for the Humanities Fellow and Pew Evangelical Scholars Fellow.

== Select bibliography ==
- Marshall, Bruce D. (2000). Trinity and Truth. Cambridge University Press. ISBN 0-511-00584-9. OCLC 47010468.
- Marshall, Bruce D., ed. (1990). Theology and Dialogue : Essays in Conversation with George Lindbeck. George A. Lindbeck. ISBN 0-268-01873-1. OCLC 22006830.
- Bruce D. Marshall, Christology in Conflict: The Identity of a Saviour in Rahner and Barth (Blackwell, 1987).
- Bruce D. Marshall, "The Flesh of the Logos: Faith and Reason Reconsidered." Nova et Vetera 16, no. 2 (2018): 587–99.
- Bruce D. Marshall, "The Ecclesial Vocation of the Theologian." In A Man of the Church: Honoring the Theology, Life, and Witness of Ralph Del Colle, edited by Michel René Barnes (Wipf & Stock Publishers, 2012), 23–39.
- Bruce D. Marshall, "Christ the End of Analogy." In The Analogy of Being: The Invention of the Antichrist or the Wisdom of God?, edited by Thomas Joseph White OP (William B. Eerdmans Publishing, 2011), 280–313.
- Bruce D. Marshall, "The Unity of the Triune God: Reviving an Ancient Question." The Thomist 74, no. 1 (2010): 1–32.
- Bruce D. Marshall, "The Dereliction of Christ and the Impassibility of God." In Divine Impassibility and the Mystery of Human Suffering, edited by James F. Keating and Thomas Joseph White OP (William B. Eerdmans Publishing, 2009), 246–98.
- Bruce D. Marshall, "Utrum Essentia Generet: Semantics and Metaphysics in Later Medieval Trinitarian Theology." In Trinitarian Theology in the Medieval West, edited by Pekka Käkkäinen (Schriften Der Luther-Agricola-Gesellschaft 61. Vaajakoski: Luther-Agricola-Society, 2007), 88–123.
- Bruce D. Marshall, "Putting Shadows to Flight: The Trinity, Faith, and Reason." In Reason and the Reasons of Faith, edited by Paul J. Griffiths and Reinhard Hütter (T&T Clark International, 2005), 53–77.
- Bruce D. Marshall, "Quod Scit Una Uetula: Aquinas on the Nature of Theology." In The Theology of Thomas Aquinas, edited by Rik Van Nieuwenhove and Joseph Wawrykow (University of Notre Dame Press, 2005), 1–35.
- Bruce D. Marshall, "Thomas, Thomisms, and Truth." The Thomist 56, no. 3 (1992): 499–524.
- Bruce D. Marshall, "Aquinas as Postliberal Theologian," The Thomist 53, no. 3 (1989): 353–402.
