= Bruce Marshall =

Bruce Marshall may refer to:

- Bruce Marshall (writer), Scottish writer
- Bruce Marshall (ice hockey), NCAA ice hockey coach
- Bruce Marshall (taxonomist), New Zealand taxonomist
- Bruce D. Marshall, American Catholic theologian
