= William Placher =

American theologian (1948–2008)

- Born: William Carl Placher; April 28, 1948; Peoria, Illinois, US
- Died: November 30, 2008 (aged 60); Collegeville, Minnesota, US

Academic background
- Education: Wabash College; Yale University
- Influences: Hans Frei; George Lindbeck

Academic work
- Discipline: Theology
- School or tradition: Postliberalism; Presbyterianism
- Institutions: Wabash College

William Carl Placher (April 28, 1948 – November 30, 2008) was an American postliberal theologian. He was LaFollette Distinguished Professor in the Humanities at Wabash College until his death in 2008. He was a leader at Wabash Avenue Presbyterian Church.

== Life ==
Placher graduated from Wabash in 1970 and completed his PhD at Yale in 1975; he became assistant professor at Wabash in 1974, but also taught at Stanford, Haverford College, Chicago and Princeton.

The American Academy of Religion awarded him the Excellence in Teaching Award in 2002.

He also worked as an editor at Christian Century.

At the time of this death, he was working in Minnesota as the Killian McDonnell Writer-in-Residence at the Collegeville Institute.

== Bibliography ==
He wrote thirteen books, including A History of Christian Theology, The Domestication of Transcendence and The Triune God.

=== Publications ===
- Unapologetic Theology, 1989
- A History of Christian Theology, 1983
- Readings in the History of Christian Theology (Volumes I and II), 1988
- Belonging to God, 1992
- Narratives of a vulnerable God, 1994
- The Domestication of Transcendence, 1996
- Why are we here? (with Ronald F. Thiemann), 1998
- Jesus the Savior, 2001
- Struggling with Scripture (with Walter Brueggemann and Brian Blount), 2002
- Callings: Twenty centuries of Christian wisdom on vocation, 2005
- The Triune God, 2007
- Mark, 2010
- Unapologetic Theology

=== Editing ===
- Essentials of Christian Theology (ed.), 2003
