= Stanley Hauerwas =

American Protestant theologian (born 1940)

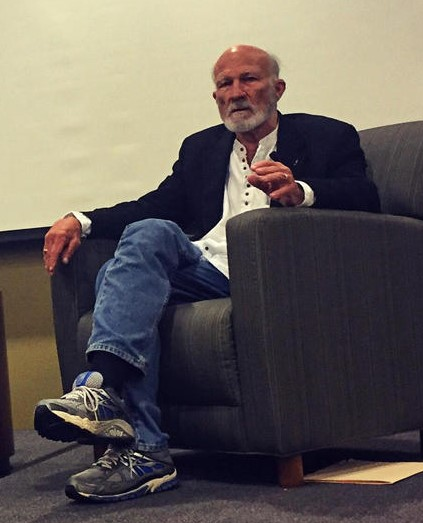
- Hauerwas in 2015
- Born: Stanley Martin Hauerwas; July 24, 1940 (age 86); Dallas, Texas, US
- Spouse: Paula Gilbert (m. 1989)

Academic background
- Education: Southwestern University; Yale University
- Thesis: Moral Character as a Problem for Theological Ethics (1968)
- Doctoral advisor: James Gustafson
- Influences: Thomas Aquinas; Aristotle; Karl Barth; Michel Foucault; Julian Hartt; William James; Søren Kierkegaard; Alasdair MacIntyre; George Lindbeck; Ludwig Wittgenstein; John Howard Yoder

Academic work
- Discipline: Theology
- Sub-discipline: Christian ethics; ecclesiology; philosophical theology; political theology (broadly construed); systematic theology
- School or tradition: Communitarianism; postliberal theology; virtue ethics
- Institutions: University of Notre Dame; Duke University; University of Aberdeen
- Doctoral students: William T. Cavanaugh
- Notable works: A Community of Character (1981); Resident Aliens (1989)
- Influenced: Rodney Clapp; Stan Goff; Emmanuel Katongole; James K. A. Smith; Bryan Stone; Tish Harrison Warren

Stanley Martin Hauerwas (/ˈhaʊərwɑːs/; born July 24, 1940) is an American Protestant theologian, ethicist, and public intellectual.

Hauerwas originally taught at the University of Notre Dame before moving to Duke University. Hauerwas was a longtime professor at Duke, serving as the Gilbert T. Rowe Professor of Theological Ethics at Duke Divinity School with a joint appointment at the Duke University School of Law. In 2014, he also assumed a chair in theological ethics at the University of Aberdeen. Hauerwas is considered by many to be one of the world's most influential living theologians and was named "America's Best Theologian" by Time magazine in 2001. He was also the first American theologian to deliver the Gifford Lectures at the University of St. Andrews in Scotland in over forty years. His work is frequently read and debated by scholars in fields outside of religion or ethics, such as political philosophy, sociology, history, and literary theory. Hauerwas has achieved notability outside of academia as a public intellectual, even appearing on The Oprah Winfrey Show.

Though Hauerwas is most well known for his work related to ethics and political theology, he has written widely on a range of subjects, including philosophical theology, political philosophy, the philosophy of social science, law, education, bioethics, and medical ethics. Hauerwas is known for his fierce criticism of liberal democracy, capitalism, and militarism. He is also a critic of both Christian fundamentalism and liberal Christianity. He is commonly cited as a member of the evangelical left. Hauerwas's work draws from a number of theological perspectives, including Methodism, Anabaptism, Anglicanism, and Catholicism. Among his most important contributions to modern theology are his advocacy of and work related to virtue ethics and postliberal theology. Hauerwas's book, A Community of Character: Toward a Constructive Christian Social Ethic, was named as one of the one hundred most important books on religion in the 20th century by Christianity Today. His most widely known book, however, is likely Resident Aliens: Life in the Christian Colony, which was co-written with William Willimon.

== Early life and education ==
Stanley Hauerwas was born in Dallas, Texas, on July 24, 1940, and was raised in nearby Pleasant Grove, in a working-class family. He attended both Pleasant Grove High School (1954–1956) and W. W. Samuell High School (1956–1958). As the son of a bricklayer, Hauerwas was early on apprenticed to the craft of bricklaying under his father. The experience was extremely formative for his later life, as he has often compared the skill and hard work that bricklaying requires with both his own approach to theological work and the challenges of living a fully Christian life.

Hauerwas's family attended Pleasant Mound Methodist Church, where he experienced baptism, confirmation, and communion. At the age of 15, he presented himself for ministry at a Sunday night worship service, presuming then that he would be saved.

After leaving Pleasant Grove, Hauerwas matriculated at Southwestern University, a liberal arts college affiliated with the United Methodist Church. He received a Bachelor of Arts degree there in 1962. He was also a member of Phi Delta Theta while at Southwestern University. He went on to earn Bachelor of Divinity, Master of Arts, Master of Philosophy, and Doctor of Philosophy degrees from Yale University. Upon delivering the Gifford Lectures in 2001, Hauerwas was also awarded an honorary Doctor of Divinity degree from the University of Edinburgh.

Following his graduation from Yale University, Hauerwas taught first at Augustana College in Rock Island, Illinois, before joining the faculty at the University of Notre Dame in 1970. He was later invited to assume a faculty position at the Divinity School of Duke University in 1983, where he taught in the area of theological ethics until his retirement in 2013, though he continues to write and speak at Duke as a senior research fellow. In 2014 he was appointed to a chair in theological ethics at the University of Aberdeen.

Hauerwas was influenced by a wide range of thinkers, including Aristotle, Thomas Aquinas, Søren Kierkegaard, Karl Barth, Ludwig Wittgenstein, John Howard Yoder, Alasdair MacIntyre, Michel Foucault, and William James.

== Honors ==
Time magazine in 2001 named him "America's Best Theologian". He responded by saying, "'Best' is not a theological category."

In 2001 Hauerwas was also invited to give the Gifford Lectures at the University of St. Andrews in Scotland, which were published as With the Grain of the Universe, a text in which Hauerwas argued that Karl Barth was the foremost "natural theologian" of the Gifford Lectures. Such an argument is controversial since Karl Barth is well known as an enemy of natural theology. For Hauerwas, however, Barth argued that Christian convictions about the world describe God's good creation as it is while emphasizing that such convictions cannot be understood apart from Christian witness. This, according to Hauerwas, is what makes Barth a proper natural theologian in comparison to Reinhold Niebuhr and William James, who were also featured in the lectures.

Earlier in 1997 he gave the Scottish Journal of Theology lectures at Aberdeen, published as Sanctify Them in Truth (1998).

== Basic theological and philosophical views ==
Hauerwas has long been associated with narrative theology and postliberal theology (which are closely related but not necessarily synonymous movements). Both of these movements are attached to Yale biblical scholars Brevard Childs, Hans Frei, and George Lindbeck. His Reforming Christian Social Ethics: Ten Theses, published in 1981, serves to summarize the key presuppositions of his alternative to what was the dominant account in Christian ethics at that time. The ten theses are listed as follows:

1. The social significance of the Gospel requires the recognition of the narrative structure of Christian convictions for the life of the church.
2. Every social ethic involves a narrative, whether it is concerned with the formulation of basic principles of social organization and/or with concrete policy alternatives.
3. The ability to provide an adequate account of our existence is the primary test of the truthfulness of a social ethic.
4. Communities formed by a truthful narrative must provide the skills to transform fate into destiny so that the unexpected, especially as it comes in the form of strangers, can be welcomed as gift.
5. The primary social task of the church is to be itself - that is, a people who have been formed by a story that provides them with the skills for negotiating the danger of this existence, trusting in God's promise of redemption.
6. Christian social ethics can only be done from the perspective of those who do not seek to control national or world history but who are content to live "out of control."
7. Christian social ethics depends on the development of leadership in the church that can trust and depend on the diversity of gifts in the community.
8. For the church to be, rather than to have, a social ethic means we must recapture the social significance of common behavior, such as acts of kindness, friendship, and the formation of families.
9. In our attempt to control our society Christians in America have too readily accepted liberalism as a social strategy appropriate to the Christian story.
10. The church does not exist to provide an ethos for democracy or any other form of social organization, but stands as a political alternative to every nation, witnessing to the kind of social life possible for those that have been formed by the story of Christ.

Hauerwas writes of narrative as "the necessary grammar of Christian convictions" in that Christian claims are inextricably linked to what God has done in history and to the ongoing story of God's people as they move through time. This sense of a "hypertemporal God" Hauerwas claims to have gotten from John Howard Yoder, who impressed upon him the need of always locating God's actions in the "timeliness" of the created order as witnessed by the Bible. He has explained this understanding of a people (i.e., church) constituted by their ongoing story with God in terms of a pointed and oft-repeated aphorism:

My claim, so offensive to some, that the first task of the church is to make the world the world, not to make the world more just, is a correlative of this theological metaphysics. The world simply cannot be narrated - the world cannot have a story - unless a people exist who make the world the world. That is an eschatological claim that presupposes we know there was a beginning only because we have seen the end ... [C]reation names God's continuing action, God's unrelenting desire for us to want to be loved by that love manifest in Christ's life, death, and resurrection.

As indicated in the quotation above, Hauerwas believes that the strong distinction between the church and the world is a necessary mark of the Christian life. He collaborated with William H. Willimon (now a retired bishop in the United Methodist Church) in 1989 to offer an accessible version of his vision of the Christian life in the book Resident Aliens: Life in the Christian Colony. This understanding of the church is based on both his narrative and postliberal approach to theology, as well as his reading of Ludwig Wittgenstein's understanding of language and language games.

Hauerwas works from within the tradition of virtue ethics, having been deeply influenced by Alasdair MacIntyre and his work After Virtue.

Hauerwas is a critic of liberal democracy. In recent years, however, Hauerwas has become conversant with the tradition of radical democracy. In 2007 he collaborated on a book on the subject with political theorist and ethicst Romand Coles entitled Christianity, Democracy, and the Radical Ordinary: Conversations Between a Radical Democrat and a Christian.

Among Hauerwas's most well-known critics are Jeffrey Stout of Princeton and Nicholas Wolterstorff of Yale, though both have often praised his work as well.

In January 2017, Hauerwas wrote an op-ed for The Washington Post in which he argues that U.S. President Donald Trump is an exemplar of American civil religion and distorted theology.

== Interaction with the thought of the Niebuhrs ==
Hauerwas's theological views may be best illuminated by his engagement with the work of Reinhold Niebuhr and H. Richard Niebuhr, often considered two of the most influential American theologians of the 20th century. Hauerwas frequently discusses the work of both Niebuhr brothers, mentioning them in some form in most of his books. Reinhold was also one of the primary subjects of Hauerwas' 2000–2001 Gifford Lectures, which were later republished in book form under the title With the Grain of the Universe.

In the early years of his career Hauerwas was influenced by the work of both brothers. Later, primarily as a result of encountering the work of John Howard Yoder, he came to disagree with fundamental elements of their theology, while continuing to affirm other elements of their work that he found important.

While many believe that the Niebuhrs' advocacy of Christian realism represents a rejection of liberal Christianity, Hauerwas argues that the brothers actually belong to that theological tradition. For him, while they both placed a strong emphasis on the sinfulness of humanity (which stood in stark contrast to most liberal thinkers), he believes that the Niebuhrs based their theologies on the presuppositions of secular philosophy rather than those of Christianity, thus placing them in the liberal tradition of modern Christian thought. In particular, Hauerwas argues that Reinhold Niebuhr was deeply influenced by William James, accepting a pragmatist epistemology.

For Hauerwas, the Niebuhrs are important figures in part because the flaws in their thinking represent the same flaws which are endemic to much of modern Christianity, with the Church often being shaped more by the culture of liberal democracy than the message of Jesus. In Hauerwas' view, this has led the Church (and Christians in general) to compromise their values and place too much faith in secular political ideologies, often leading to a misplaced passion for political power. This represents the thesis of Hauerwas in his most popular book, Resident Aliens (which was co-written by William Willimon). In the book, Hauerwas and Willimon argue that the Church's accommodation to secular culture has led to tragedies like the dropping of the atomic bomb on Hiroshima Hauerwas, therefore, believes that the Niebuhrs' thinking is subject to the same flaws as Jerry Falwell, with Hauerwas and Willimon stating that "few books have been a greater hindrance to an accurate assessment of [the Church's] situation" than H. Richard Niebuhr's famous book Christ and Culture. Thus according to Hauerwas, while they may have disagreed when it comes to policy, both the Niebuhrs and Falwell fell prey to the notion Christians have a duty to use the political process as a means to enact "Christian" legislation or pursue justice.

In his book The Peaceable Kingdom Hauerwas offers commentary on two classic essays written by the Niebuhrs for The Christian Century on the subject of the Conflict in Manchuria. In the first essay, entitled "The Grace of Doing Nothing", H. Richard Niebuhr argues that humans are self-interested and egoistic and that Christians, because they are subject to these same flaws, should remain non-violent even in a time of war. In his essay in response, entitled "Must We Do Nothing?", Reinhold Niebuhr argues that Christians must have a self-awareness about their own sinfulness and self-interestedness, but must sometimes use force to protect certain ideals and people. In his commentary Hauerwas acknowledges that both brothers make important points, but critiques Reinhold's view, ultimately agreeing with H. Richard Niebuhr.

== Views on separation of theology and ethics ==
One of Hauerwas views on modern theology is its relation to ethics. Most notably his belief that theology shouldn't be separated from ethics. According to Hauerwas, there was a time when Christian ethics couldn't be distinguished from their beliefs and their behaviors. Before Christianity became the imperial religion with the conversion of Constantine the Great there were very few Christians, thus how they differed from the main population made all the difference. After the conversion of Constantine the Great, everyone was "born" Christian, thus the difference between Christians and everyone else became unclear. Hauerwas continues his argument, stating that in this era, moral behavior became secondary to theological belief. He believes that this was the original point in which theology and ethics diverged. However, he has been a rather vocal advocate of these two areas no longer being considered separate.

== Views on the importance of the Church ==
One of the common messages that Hauerwas always seems to return to is the importance of the Church, some often calling his views ecclesiological. Certain scholars, such as Nigel Biggar and Nicholas Healy, have even accused him of going too far and focusing more on the Church than God. Despite his critics, Hauerwas still believes the church is one of the most important aspects of Christianity. Believing that it acts as "a community of character that forms Christians in the likeness of Christ." Hauerwas believes that in modern times the church has shifted away from this ideal form, believing that this has caused Christians to become less outspoken and avoid saying what they believe to be true.

== Views on death and dying well ==
Hauerwas believes that there is a difference between the concept of death and the criteria for death. The concept of death "involves a philosophical judgment of a significant change that has happened in a person" and therefore "is a correlative of what one takes to be the necessary condition of human life, e.g., ... the potential for consciousness". The criteria of death, however, are "those empirical measurements that can be made to determine whether a person is dead, such as cessation of respiration or a flat EEG". Thus, brain death is a criterion of death that may serve "as a symbol of when it is time to die".

== Bibliography ==
Hauerwas is a prolific writer. Many of his books are collections of essays; some are structured monographs.

- Vision and Virtue: Essays in Christian Ethical Reflection (University of Notre Dame Press, 1974) ISBN 9780268019211
- Character and the Christian Life: A Study in Theological Ethics (University of Notre Dame Press, 1975) ISBN 9780268007720
- Truthfulness and Tragedy: Further Investigations into Christian Ethics (with Richard Bondi and David Burrell) (1977) ISBN 9780268018320
- A Community of Character: Toward A Constructive Christian Social Ethic (1981) ISBN 0-268-00735-7
- Responsibility for Devalued Persons: Ethical Interactions Between Society, Family, and the Retarded (1982) ISBN 9780398047054
- The Peaceable Kingdom: A Primer in Christian Ethics (1983) ISBN 0-268-01554-6
- Revisions: Changing Perspectives in Moral Philosophy (with Alasdair MacIntyre) (1983) ISBN 9780268016142
- Should War Be Eliminated? Philosophical and Theological Investigations (1984) ISBN 9780874625394
- Against the Nations: War and Survival in a Liberal Society (1985) ISBN 0-86683-957-7
- Suffering Presence: Theological Reflections on Medicine, the Mentally Handicapped, and the Church (1986)
- Christian Existence Today: Essays on Church, World, and Living in Between (1988)
- Resident Aliens: Life in the Christian Colony (with William Willimon) (1989) ISBN 0-687-36159-1
- Naming the Silence: God, Medicine and the Problem of Suffering (1990)
- After Christendom: How the Church Is to Behave If Freedom, Justice, and a Christian Nation Are Bad Ideas (1991) ISBN 0-687-00929-4
- Abortion Theologically Understood (1991)
- Schooling Christians: Holy Experiments in American Education (with John Westerhoff) (1992) ISBN 9780802804044
- Unleashing the Scripture: Freeing the Bible from Captivity to America (1993) ISBN 0-687-31678-2
- Character and the Christian Life: A Study in Theological Ethics (1994) ISBN 9780268007720
- God, Medicine, and Suffering (Eerdmans, 1994) ISBN 9780802808967
- Theology Without Foundations: Religious Practice and the Future of Theological Truth (with Nancey Murphy and Mark Nation) (1994)
- Dispatches from the Front: Theological Engagements with the Secular (Duke University Press, 1994) ISBN 9780822317166
- In Good Company: The Church as Polis (University of Notre Dame Press, 1995) ISBN 9780268011796
- Lord, Teach Us: The Lord's Prayer and the Christian Life (with William Willimon) (1996)
- Where Resident Aliens Live (with William Willimon) (1996)
- Christians Among the Virtues: Theological Conversations with Ancient and Modern Ethics (with Charles Pinches) (1997)
- Wilderness Wanderings: Probing Twentieth Century Theology and Philosophy (1997)
- Sanctify Them in Truth: Holiness Exemplified (1998) ISBN 9780687082230
- Prayers Plainly Spoken (1999)
- The Truth About God: The Ten Commandments in Christian Life (with William Willimon) (1999) ISBN 9780687082025
- A Better Hope: Resources for a Church Confronting Capitalism, Democracy and Postmodernity (2000)
- The Hauerwas Reader (2001) ISBN 0-8223-2691-4
- With the Grain of the Universe: The Church's Witness and Natural Theology (2001) ISBN 1-58743-016-9
- Dissent from the Homeland: Essays after September 11 (2002) (Co-Editor with Frank Lentricchia)
- Growing Old in Christ (2003)
- The Blackwell Companion to Christian Ethics (with Samuel Wells) (2004)
- Performing the Faith: Bonhoeffer and the Practice of Non-Violence (2004) ISBN 1-58743-076-2
- The Wisdom of the Cross: Essays in Honor of John Howard Yoder (co-edited with Chris Huebner and Harry Huebner) (2005)
- The State of the University: Academic Knowledges and the Knowledge of God (2007)
- Matthew (Brazos Theological Commentary on the Bible) (2007)
- Christianity, Democracy, and the Radical Ordinary: Conversations between a Radical Democrat and a Christian (with Romand Coles) (2007)
- Living Gently in a Violent World: The Prophetic Witness of Weakness (with Jean Vanier) (2008)
- A Cross-Shattered Church: Reclaiming the Theological Heart of Preaching (Brazos, 2009) ISBN 9781587432583
- Hannah's Child: A Theologian's Memoir (2010) ISBN 9780802864871
- Cross-Shattered Christ: Meditations on the Seven Last Words (2011) ISBN 9781587433085
- Working with Words: On Learning to Speak Christian (Cascade Books, 2011) ISBN 9781608999682
- War and the American Difference: Theological Reflections on Violence and National Identity (2011) ISBN 9780801039294
- Without Apology: Sermons for Christ's Church (2013) ISBN 9781596272484
- Approaching the End: Eschatological Reflection on Church, Politics, and Life (2013) ISBN 9780802869593
- The Holy Spirit (with Will Willimon) (2015)
- The Work of Theology (2015)
- Beginnings: Interrogating Hauerwas (with Brian Brock) (2017)
- The Character of Virtue: Letters to a Godson (with an introduction by Samuel Wells) (2018).
- Series co-editor (with Peter Ochs) of Radical Traditions: Theology in a Postcritical Key, published by Westview Press/HarperCollins and SCM Press/Eerdmans
- Series co-editor (with Peter Ochs and Ibrahim Moosa) of Encountering Traditions, published by Stanford University Press.
- Fully Alive: The Apocalyptic Humanism of Karl Barth (Richard E. Myers Lectures: Presented by University Baptist Church, Charlottesville), 2023, by Stanley Hauerwas
- Jesus Changes Everything: A New World Made Possible (Edited by Charles E. Moore) (2025) ISBN 9781636081571

Academic offices
Preceded by Marilyn McCord Adams	Gifford Lecturer at the University of St. Andrews; 2001–2002	Succeeded by Peter van Inwagen
