= Religious horror =

Film genre combining horror with religious themes and imagery

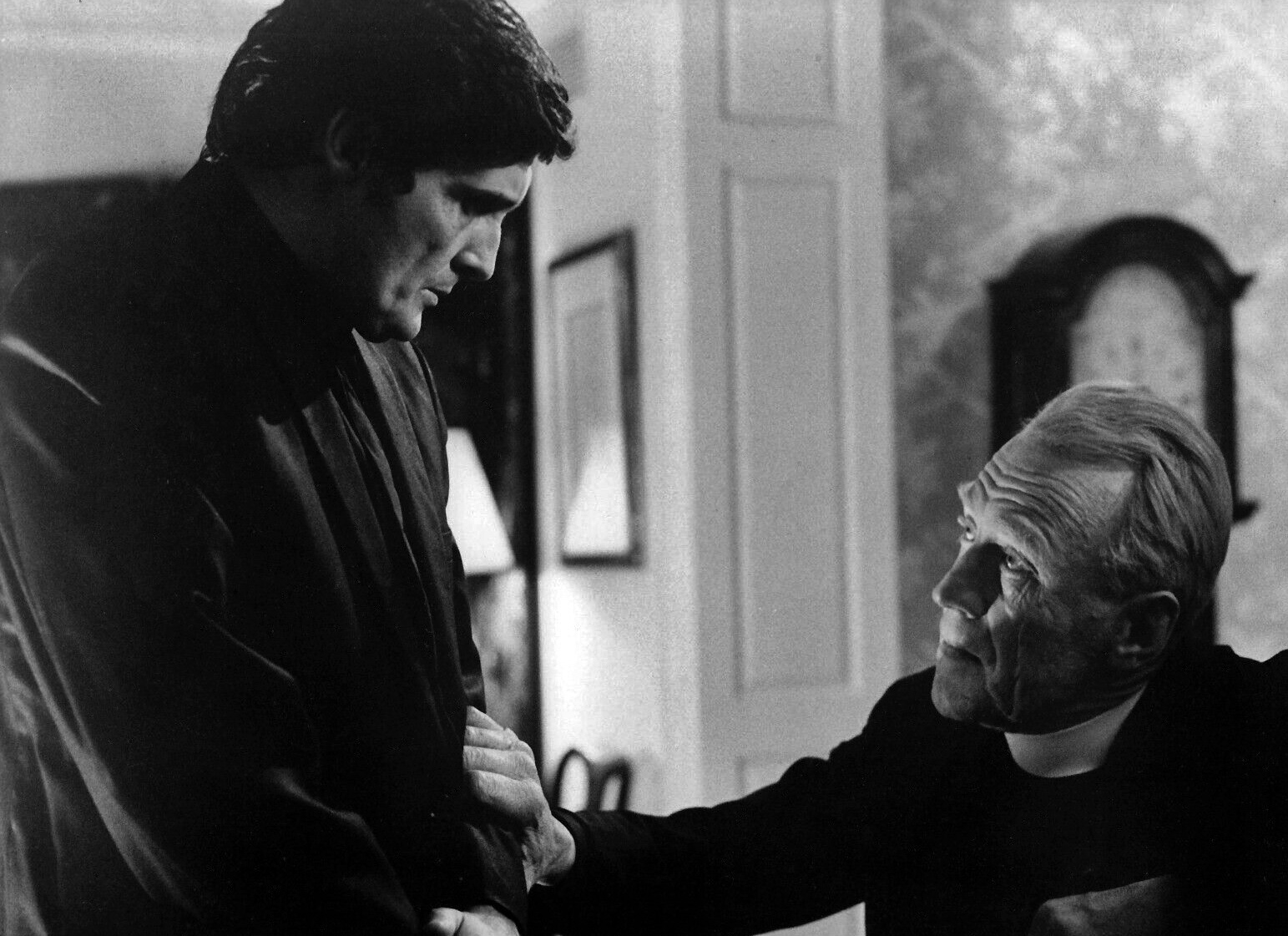
Jason Miller and Max von Sydow as priests in The Exorcist

Religious horror is a subgenre of horror film that incorporates religious themes, beliefs, traditions, symbols, rituals, and imagery into its narratives, often centering on supernatural or metaphysical threats associated with spiritual conflict. While it is sometimes treated as a subset of supernatural horror, the term is generally used for works in which religious doctrine, clergy, or sacred rituals play a central role in the story. Such films commonly depict characters facing supernatural forces and turning to faith or religious practices in response.

== Characteristics ==
The genre frequently draws on Christian traditions — particularly Roman Catholicism — and includes elements such as demonic possession, divine punishment, and cult activity. Religious symbols such as crucifixes and holy water are commonly portrayed as means of resisting or confronting evil.

== Visual style and cinematic techniques ==
=== Iconography ===
In religious horror, imagery from religious traditions—such as crucifixes, holy water, sacred texts, and relics—is commonly used. These symbols often represent protection from supernatural threats, though they are sometimes shown in a corrupted or damaged state, like desecrated altars or distorted imagery. This contrast highlights the clash between what is considered pure and what is seen as evil.

=== Use of space and setting ===
Settings in these plots often include churches, monasteries, convents, and other sacred spaces, which help create a sense of spiritual significance. These locations may be portrayed as places of safety, but they can also become sites where evil appears, challenging expectations. Isolated settings, such as remote abbeys or rural homes, are also common and help reinforce themes of confinement while heightening psychological and spiritual tension.

=== Lighting and color symbolism ===
Use of lighting is usually dark with strong contrasts between light and shadow, creating a chiaroscuro effect. This helps reflect the contrast between good and evil. Bright light often represents purity or a divine presence, while darkness is linked to evil or mystery. Colors are also used symbolically, with white for innocence, red for sin or sacrifice, and black for death or corruption. These visual choices come from religious art and give the genre its distinct style.

=== Sound and editing ===
Sound and editing are important in these works for building mood and tension. Filmmakers often use silence, ambient sounds, or religious music to create an unsettling atmosphere. Sudden noises, quick cuts, or distorted audio can signal something supernatural. Ritual scenes, especially exorcisms, are usually slower and use close-up shots to make them feel more intense and powerful.

== Relationship with supernatural horror ==
Religious horror is generally seen as a subgenre of supernatural horror, since both deal with things like demons, spirits, and other forces beyond the natural world. The difference is that religious horror is more directly tied to organized religion, including its beliefs, practices, and institutions. While supernatural horror can draw from folklore or unexplained events in a broad sense, religious horror usually focuses on specific ideas such as sin, divine authority, and the divide between the sacred and the profane. Because of this, religious figures, institutions, and symbols—such as clergy, sacred texts, and exorcism rituals—often take on a central role in dealing with supernatural threats.

== Historical roots ==
The roots of the subgenre can be found in early religious stories and mythological traditions, many of which include demons, punishment from a higher power, and visions of the afterlife. In Western Europe, medieval Christian ideas about hell, sin, and the devil had a strong influence on later horror imagery. Similar themes can also be found in other traditions, such as jinn in Islamic folklore or various spirit beings in Hindu and Buddhist cosmologies. These kinds of stories were not only meant to teach moral lessons but also reflected people’s fears about the unknown and the unseen.

== Themes and narrative conventions ==
Many religious horror stories revolve around themes like sin, guilt, redemption, and divine judgment. Plots often involve possession, exorcism, or encounters with demonic entities, usually framed as part of a larger struggle between good and evil. Characters might go through a crisis of faith or turn to religion as a way to confront what they’re facing. At the same time, these stories often explore the tension between belief and doubt, along with the psychological and spiritual effects of encountering something that challenges their understanding of the sacred.

== Comparison with other horror subgenres ==
Religious horror is often discussed alongside other subgenres, especially supernatural and cosmic horror. Supernatural horror covers a wide range of paranormal events and doesn’t always rely on religious ideas, whereas religious horror is more clearly rooted in established belief systems. Cosmic horror, on the other hand—often linked to the works of H. P. Lovecraft—moves in a different direction by downplaying or rejecting religion altogether, focusing instead on an indifferent and unknowable universe. As a result, religious horror tends to frame fear in terms of moral or spiritual conflict, while cosmic horror leans more toward existential fear and uncertainty.

== Cross-cultural religious horror ==
Although much of religious horror in Western cinema is shaped by Christian imagery, the genre appears in many different cultural settings. In Islamic horror, for example, stories often involve jinn or spirit possession. In South and Southeast Asian films, themes like karma, reincarnation, and ancestral spirits—drawn from Hindu and Buddhist traditions—are more common. These differences show how the genre can shift depending on the belief system it draws from, while still keeping a focus on the connection between religion and the supernatural.

== Critical analysis ==
Scholars often point out that religious horror both reflects and influences religious belief, as well as broader cultural fears. Some see the genre as reinforcing belief systems, especially when it portrays religious rituals or authority as effective against supernatural threats. Others argue that it can also question or critique religion, particularly through stories that highlight doubt, corruption, or loss of faith. Because of this, religious horror doesn’t fit neatly into one role—it can support religious ideas in some cases, while challenging them in others.

== Controversies and criticism ==
Religious horror has often sparked debate over how it portrays sacred beliefs and institutions. Some critics view the genre as exploitative or irreverent, especially when religious figures or rituals are shown in a negative or sensationalized way. At the same time, others argue that it can reinforce religious belief by emphasizing the strength of faith and the reality of spiritual conflict. These differing interpretations reflect how religious horror can be seen as both challenging and affirming religious ideas, depending on the audience.

Some film critics have also expressed concern about the way religion is represented in horror cinema. In one review, Sam Acosta argues that “An entire genre most Christians seem to reject regardless of the franchise is horror.” He supports his view by referencing biblical passages and authors who are critical of such portrayals. Others suggest that the genre often reduces religious symbols and practices to simple storytelling devices rather than exploring their deeper theological meaning. For instance, elements such as crucifixes, exorcism rituals, and demonic figures are frequently used primarily to create fear, rather than to reflect meaningful spiritual ideas.

Another common criticism is that religious horror relies heavily on Christian imagery, which some scholars argue can reinforce narrow cultural viewpoints or stereotypes about religion. Research on horror cinema has noted that many films draw extensively from Christian traditions, while other belief systems are sometimes portrayed as exotic, threatening, or “other.”

On the other hand, some scholars take a more neutral or interpretive approach. Bryan P. Stone notes that horror cinema often uses religious narratives as “powerful cultural resources for representing evil and confronting fear.” Similarly, Timothy K. Beal observes that monsters in popular culture often act as “embodiments of cultural fears and anxieties” shaped by religious traditions. Rick Worland also points out that horror films frequently draw on religious mythology to structure conflicts between good and evil.

Critics further argue that religious horror sometimes presents religious institutions or doctrines in exaggerated or controversial ways. Certain films have been criticized for distorting depictions of faith, morality, or religious authority in order to heighten drama or shock value. This has led to ongoing debate about whether the genre is genuinely engaging with religious themes or simply using them as aesthetic and narrative tools.

== See also ==
- Folk horror
- Gothic fiction
- Criticism of religion
- Supernatural horror film
