= Molly Farneth =

American religious scholar

Academic background
- Education: Princeton University (PhD)
- Thesis: Agon & Reconciliation: Ethical Conflict and Religious Practice in Hegel’s Account of Spirit (2014)
- Doctoral advisor: Jeffrey Stout

Academic work
- Era: Contemporary philosophy
- Region: Western philosophy
- Institutions: Haverford College
- Website: https://www.haverford.edu/users/mfarneth

Molly Farneth is a professor and chair of religion at Haverford College. She is the author of Hegel's Social Ethics: Religion, Conflict, and Rituals of Reconciliation (Princeton University Press, 2017) and The Politics of Ritual (Princeton University Press, 2023).

== Life and works ==
Farneth's research and teaching focus on modern Western religious thought with special attention to social and political ethics.

- Farneth, Molly (14 March 2023). The Politics of Ritual. Princeton University Press. doi:10.2307/j.ctv2wr4wbd. ISBN 978-0-691-24892-9. JSTOR j.ctv2wr4wbd.
- Farneth, Molly (2 August 2017). Hegel's Social Ethics: Religion, Conflict, and Rituals of Reconciliation. Princeton University Press. doi:10.2307/j.ctt1vxm80v. ISBN 978-1-4008-8799-6. JSTOR j.ctt1vxm80v.
