= The Politics of Ritual =

2013 non-fiction book

- Author: Molly Farneth
- Publisher: Princeton University Press
- Publication date: 2023
- ISBN: 978-0-691-19892-7

The Politics of Ritual is a ritual studies book by Molly Farneth. It was published in 2023 by Princeton University Press.

== General references ==
- Deng, Hongcan; Li, Chengjian (October 2024). "The Politics of Ritual: by Molly Farneth, Princeton, Princeton University Press, 2023, 232 pp., US$27.95 (paperback) ISBN 978 069 119892 7". Religion. 54 (4): 761–763. doi:10.1080/0048721X.2024.2361394. ISSN 0048-721X.
- Osinski, Keegan (2024-12-31). "The Politics of Ritual, By Molly Farneth". Literature & Theology. 38 (4): 352–354. doi:10.1093/litthe/frae005. ISSN 0269-1205.
- "The Politics of Ritual by Molly Farneth (review)". Nova Religio. 28 (1): 108–110. August 2024. doi:10.1353/nvr.2024.a935568. ISSN 1541-8480.
