= Frei test =

- Purpose: identify lymphogranuloma venereum.

The Frei test was developed in 1925 by Wilhelm Siegmund Frei, a German dermatologist, to identify lymphogranuloma venereum. Antigen made from sterile pus aspirated from previously unruptured abscesses, produced a reaction in patients with lymphogranuloma venereum when injected intradermally. Other sources of antigen have been explored, most deriving from various tissues of mice infected with Chlamydia. The test is no longer used but stands as a milestone in our understanding of immunology. A heat inactivated LGV 0.1ml grown in yolk sac of embryonated egg is injected intra dermally on the forearm and a control material prepared from noninfected yolk sac on the other forearm i.e. control. After 48–72 hours, an inflammatory nodule more than 6mm in diameter develops at the test site.
