= North Alabama annual conference =

Annual Conference in United Methodist Church

The North Alabama Conference is an Annual Conference (a regional episcopal area, similar to a diocese) of the United Methodist Church.

This conference serves approximately 300 UMCs in the northern half of the state of Alabama, with its administrative offices and the office of the bishop located in Birmingham, AL. It is part of the Southeastern Jurisdictional Conference. The bishop is the Reverend L. Jonathan Holston.

== Bishops ==
- 1944-1948 Bishop Costen J. Harrell, D.D.
- 1948-1952 Bishop Clare Purcell
- 1960-1964 Bishop Nolan Bailey Harmon
- 1972-1980 Bishop Carl Julian Sanders
- 1984-1992 Bishop J. Lloyd Knox
- 1992-2004: Bishop Robert Eugene Fannin
- 2004-2012 Bishop Will Willimon, D.D
- 2012–2024: Bishop Debra Wallace-Padgett
- 2024-present: L. Jonathan Holston

== Districts ==
The North Alabama Annual Conference is further subdivided into four smaller regions called "districts," which provide further administrative functions for the operation of local churches in cooperation with each other. This structure is vital to Methodism, and is referred to as connectionalism. Since mid-2024 the districts are: East, Mid Central, North, and West. Previously there were a larger number of districts including Central, Cheaha, Mountain Lakes, Northeast, Northwest, South Central, Southeast, and Southwest.

== 2023 conference ==
The 2023 conference saw the official disaffiliation of 132 congregations, following ongoing discussions about the UMC's stance on homosexuality. Most of the congregations went on to form the Global Methodist Church.
