= Wilhelm Siegmund Frei =

German dermatologist (1885–1943)

- Born: 5 September 1885; Neustadt
- Died: 27 January 1943 (aged 56); New York City
- Education: University of Göttingen
- Known for: Development of Frei test
- Spouse: Magda Frankfurter
- Children: Marianne, Fritz, Hans
- Scientific career
- Fields: Dermatology

Wilhelm Siegmund Frei (5 September 1885 – 27 January 1943) was a German dermatologist best known for his contributions to Durand-Nicolas-Favre disease, a sexually transmitted disease found mainly in tropical and subtropical climates. He is also known for the Frei Test, which was developed in 1925 for the detection of lymphogranuloma venereum (LGV).

== Early life ==
Wilhelm Siegmund Frei was born in Neustadt, Upper Silesia. His father, Emil Frei, was a mining firm director, from Neustadt. His mother was Frederika Ring, who came from Austria. Wilhelm had two sisters, Gerta Frei (1887 — presumably killed by Nazis) and Josephina Frei (1888).

== Life ==
Wilhelm studied medicine in Freiburg, Germany, and went on to get his doctorate in Göttingen in 1913. He met Magda Frankfurter (1885–1973) when they were both studying medicine in Freiburg and was married on 12 January 1912. They had their first child Marianne, later that year on 7 November 1912, and their second child Fritz was born on 12 December 1915 and Hans Wilhelm Frei born on 29 April 1922.

Due to the rise of the Nazis and bad times looming ahead in Germany, he immigrated to New York with his family and went to work at the Montefiore Hospital in the Bronx from 1937 until he fell ill and died on 27 January 1943, leaving behind his wife and three children at the age of 58.
