= Hans Frei =

American theologian (1922–1988)

- Born: Hans Wilhelm Frei; April 29, 1922; Breslau, Lower Silesia, Germany
- Died: September 12, 1988 (aged 66); New Haven, Connecticut, US
- Spouse: Geraldine Nye (m. 1948)
- Parent: Wilhelm Siegmund Frei

Academic background
- Education: North Carolina State University; Yale University
- Doctoral advisor: H. Richard Niebuhr

Academic work
- Discipline: Biblical studies; theology
- Sub-discipline: Biblical hermeneutics; Christology
- School or tradition: Postliberal theology
- Institutions: Yale University
- Notable works: The Eclipse of Biblical Narrative (1974)
- Influenced: George Lindbeck; William Placher

Hans Wilhelm Frei (April 29, 1922 – September 12, 1988) was an American biblical scholar and theologian who is best known for work on biblical hermeneutics. Frei's work played a major role in the development of postliberal theology (also called narrative theology or the Yale school of theology). His best-known and most influential work is his 1974 book, The Eclipse of Biblical Narrative (Yale University Press), which examined the history of eighteenth- and nineteenth-century biblical hermeneutics in England and Germany. Frei spent much of his career teaching at Yale Divinity School.

== Early life ==
=== Europe ===
Hans Frei once described his early years as involving a series of "worlds left behind". He was born on April 29, 1922, in Breslau, Lower Silesia, Germany, to secularized Jewish parents (Magda Frankfurther Frei, a pediatrician; Wilhelm Siegmund Frei, a venereologist on the medical faculty of the University of Breslau). That Jewish culture did not play a huge part in his upbringing can be seen from the fact that he was baptized into the Lutheran church along with most other members of his class, and from his memory that he was forbidden from using Yiddish phrases at home. His family was reasonably well-to-do and considered themselves to have a distinguished past. Young Hans got a solid German education and read widely in the classics. As antisemitic violence rose in Germany, he was sent away from that world – away from Nazi Germany to the Quaker school in Saffron Walden, England, in January 1935.

Although he found speaking English daunting and was sometimes lonely, he found England a welcoming and courteous place, and despite his own isolation and anxiety was struck by the absence in England of the pervasive fear which he thought had been a feature of life in 1930s Germany. Young Frei believed that war was on the way, and wanted to stay in England.

It was at the Friends’ school that Frei saw a picture of Jesus and suddenly "knew that it was true" – this conversion experience led him to a form of Christianity which at this stage had nothing to do with attendance at church. Later in his life, even when Quaker theology ran against the grain of his own thinking, he still found their meetings more satisfying than his adopted Anglican liturgies.

=== America ===
After three years, in August 1938, his parents left Germany, and Frei moved with them to the United States, where he was terrified by his encounter with New York City. It was a difficult time, and Frei had trouble feeling that he belonged. The family were very short of money, and were only able to find him a scholarship to study textile engineering at North Carolina State University (after seeing an advertisement for it in a paper). He gained a Bachelor of Science degree there in 1942. Nevertheless, he took to his adopted country and made it thoroughly his own – so much so that when he went back to Germany for a visit in the 1950s he felt most definitely like a visiting American Professor rather than a German exile returned. In particular, he found a home within America in New Haven, Connecticut, at Yale University.

== Turning to theology ==
While at North Carolina State, Frei began corresponding with the theologian H. Richard Niebuhr and enrolled for a Bachelor of Divinity degree at Yale Divinity School (YDS). At YDS, he was mentored by Niebuhr, R. L. Calhoun and Julian Hartt, and there he developed his lifelong theological attitudes and carried out his teaching and administrative duties.

He graduated in 1945, and became a Baptist minister at the First Baptist Church, North Stratford, New Hampshire. Despite the work involved in the parish, in being a local preacher, and in some teaching work, Frei found time to read a great deal in solitude. He found himself drawn towards Anglicanism, towards what he saw as its more obviously 'generous' orthodoxy – to such an extent that in later life he was to say that Baptist ministry had always felt like a staging post on the way to somewhere else. At the same time, he developed a yearning for more academic work.

Frei returned to the graduate school at Yale Divinity School in 1947, and began a lengthy doctoral dissertation, under H. Richard Niebuhr, on Karl Barth's early doctrine of Revelation. This was to take until 1956 to complete – but some of that time is explained by the other things Frei was doing. On October 9, 1948, he married Geraldine Frost Nye. He landed a job as assistant professor of religion at Wabash College, Indiana, in 1950. A son, Thomas, was born in 1952. In 1953 Frei became associate professor of theology at the Episcopal Theological Seminary of the Southwest (with some time as Visiting Lecturer in the Southern Methodist University in 1954), and was involved with St. John's Episcopal Church in Crawfordsville, Indiana, while teaching at Wabash College. In 1955 a second son, Jonathan, was born. He completed his thesis in 1956 and was promoted to Professor of Theology. A year later, he returned to Yale Divinity School as assistant professor of Religious Studies, and, in the same year, his daughter Emily was born.

Between 1958 and 1966 Frei worked away more or less in obscurity. As can be seen from an annotated bibliography, there are very few recorded writings from this period. After the publication of two essays for a festschrift for Niebuhr in 1957 (including extracts from his thesis), and a short article on 'Religion, Natural and Revealed' in a handbook of Christian theology published the following year, there is a great gap. Frei delivered a talk on Ludwig Feuerbach at the 1965 meeting of the American Academy of Religion, admittedly, but this does not seem to have been particularly central to his work. All the indications are that he had thrown himself into teaching, and into the slow, painstaking research that would eventually emerge as The Eclipse of Biblical Narrative. In many ways he felt that the stands he had taken in his thesis against prevailing modes of apologetical and anthropocentric theology isolated him (again), made his work a struggle against the tide. He did not have the temperament for the kind of sweeping statements and rabble-rousing clarion calls which might have pulled supporters to his side, and he produced his careful and complex writings only after taking great pains.

It was during this period of obscurity that Frei received a Morse Fellowship and a Fulbright Award for research at the University of Göttingen (1959–60) . A little later, with the help of an American Association of Theological Schools Fellowship and a Yale Senior Faculty Fellowship, Frei spent some time in Cambridge, England (1966–7). His trip back to Germany was clouded by the sense that the recent past had been brushed under an inadequate rug, that it didn't matter, that Germany had re-invented itself rather than dealing with what had taken place. A meeting with Emanuel Hirsch, which was only granted when Frei agreed not to raise the question of Nazism, confirmed Frei's impressions. Frei also spent time in England, which he appears to have enjoyed, and even though he found that nothing much was going on theologically in Cambridge that interested him, he frequently referred back in later life to how much he had enjoyed his time there.

== Earlier theological work ==
Frei was appointed associate professor in 1963. Then, between 1966 and 1968, almost as an interruption to the work which was proceeding towards Eclipse, Frei produced a 'theological proposal' – a lengthy article, expanded a little later into an adult education course, commented on in a lecture, and accompanied by a contribution to a seminar on the work of Karl Barth, after the latter's death. This 'proposal' emerged to wider scrutiny only some years later, when (in 1975) the adult education course was republished as The Identity of Jesus Christ. This strange project, an exercise in the rethinking of the structure and bases of Christology and, even though Frei soon developed doubts about various important aspects of it, it sets the tone and the themes for most of the rest of what he went on to say in theology.

After that brief flurry of activity, Frei returned to honing his work on Eclipse, which was eventually published (to much wider recognition) in 1974. By that time, Frei had been Acting Master of Silliman College, Yale (1970–1971), and Master of Ezra Stiles College (from 1972), the latter a post he was to hold until 1980. The publication of Eclipse coincided with Frei's appointment to a full Professorship. Frei then entered another period of comparative silence, although this time it was not in complete obscurity: his name was out, rattling around in theological and historical circles attached to the massive and ground-breaking Eclipse, with Identity as a strange accompaniment. His silence was not so much due to the pressures of teaching or to isolated and exhaustive research, but to his commitment to his job as Master of Ezra Stiles. Frei also served as chair of the council of masters in 1975.

The 1970s were a difficult decade for Frei. He found himself troubled about his links to the church. Firmly convinced theologically that he should have some kind of ecclesiastical grounding and location for his work as well as his academic setting, he nevertheless felt distanced from his adopted Anglican home, and yet committed to stay there. He found himself theologically uneasy about the places where he did feel less isolated – in particular, Quaker meetings. At the same time he found himself unable easily to call himself a theologian, particularly not a systematic theologian, and he concentrated his energies instead on the 'religious studies' (for which read 'historical') side of his work. Nevertheless, the questions he asked, the issues which interested him, the way he pursued that historical work – all were theological, and he knew it. The ambivalence seems not exactly to have haunted him, but at least to have been never far from his working mind.

The major work which Frei completed in this decade (after Eclipse) was all historical. He directed a National Endowment for the Humanities summer seminar in 1976 (his title was 'Modernity as Temptation'), and he delivered various lectures including the Rice Lectures in 1974 (on Gotthold Ephraim Lessing, Johann Gottfried Herder and Immanuel Kant) and the George F. Thomas Memorial Lectures in 1978 (on Lessing). He also produced a piece of work which he thought of as perhaps his finest: the essay on David Strauss which was eventually published in 1985, although Frei finished it in the very early 1980s after having worked on it throughout the last years of the 1970s.

== Later theological work ==
In the late seventies, Frei's outlook began to shift. He found himself increasingly drawn away from purely intellectual history and towards social history; in tandem he found his doubts about aspects of the Identity and Eclipse phase of his work crystallizing in a shift away from more theoretical hermeneutical solutions towards more social, "cultural-linguistic" – and, we might say, more ecclesiological and pneumatological – solutions. In the 1978 George F. Thomas Lecture, he issued what can in retrospect be seen as something of a personal manifesto, using the word "sensibility" to denote the object of a kind of historical study which would look for the shape and development of religious styles, attitudes and doctrines firmly embedded in the development and interaction of social institutions of various overlapping kinds. In 1981, he spent some time in England during which he looked, on advice from Owen Chadwick, at visitation returns and sermons from the eighteenth century life of a couple of English parishes, hoping to find a way to combine the more social and cultural historical insights which these things gave him into the Christianity of the time with the insights he had hitherto gained through a more traditional study of well-known high-culture theologians and philosophers.

From 1982 until 1988, his time as Master over, Frei returned to publishing and writing with a vengeance. Although still not prolific by the standards of many of his contemporaries, by his own standards his output was vast. He returned to both strands of his earlier constructive theological work: hermeneutics (which had been the subject matter of Eclipse) and Christology (the subject matter of Identity). In 1982 he delivered a paper on the interpretation of narrative, at Haverford College; in 1983 the Shaffer Lectures at Yale (in which he began to develop what has subsequently become a famous five-place typology for understanding modern theology) and delivered a long paper on hermeneutics at the University of California. His work did not even flag when he became chair of the Department of Religious Studies from 1983 to 1986. He spoke in 1985 in response to an assessment of his work by the evangelical theologian Carl F. H. Henry; in 1986 he spoke at a conference in honour of Jürgen Moltmann, delivered a lecture at Princeton University, and spoke on Barth and Friedrich Schleiermacher at a conference at Stony Point, New York. In 1987 he delivered the Cadbury lectures in Birmingham, England, and the Humanities Council lectures at Princeton. He prepared a contribution to Bruce Marshall's festschrift for George Lindbeck, and another for a conference on H. Richard Niebuhr to be held in September 1988.

Most of these papers and lectures were indirectly or directly directed towards one end: a history of the figure of Jesus in popular and high culture in England and Germany since 1750. Frei seems to have found a new theological confidence bubbling up with this historical project, however: now, more than ever, the two sides of his work (which had been the source of his ambivalence in the 1970s) become inextricably linked. One moment he can be talking about the rise of the professions in Germany and the impact that had on theology in the Universities. The next moment he can be talking about the sensus literalis of scripture and theology as Christian self-description. The next moment (although this is not immediately evident from his published work) he can be talking about providence and pilgrimage. It is hard now to gauge exactly what shape the final project would have taken in which all this rich material would have been combined, but it is clear that Frei wished to pursue theological reflection through the medium of detailed historical work, and wished to hone a full-blown Christology of his own – a Christology which would have had a significant political dimension – by paying detailed attention to the ways in which Jesus had been described and redescribed in Western Protestant culture since the Enlightenment.

== Death ==
The potential project of a comprehensive Christology was, however, never completed. Before he could deliver a paper he had written for a conference on H. Richard Niebuhr, he fell ill, and the paper was given in his absence. Frei died of a stroke on September 12, 1988, at the peak of his theological and historical career.

== Key writings ==
- The Eclipse of Biblical Narrative: A Study in Eighteenth and Nineteenth Century Hermeneutics, (New Haven & London: Yale University Press, 1974)
- The Identity of Jesus Christ: The Hermeneutical Bases of Dogmatic Theology, (Philadelphia: Fortress Press, 1975)
- The Identity of Jesus Christ, Expanded and Updated Edition, (Cascade Books: An Imprint of Wipf and Stock Publishers, 2013)
- 'The "Literal Reading" of Biblical Narrative in the Christian Tradition: Does it Stretch or Will it Break?', in Frank McConnell, The Bible and the Narrative Tradition, (New York; Oxford: Oxford University Press, 1986)
- Types of Christian Theology, (1992)
- Theology and narrative:Selected Essays, (1993)
