= Christ and Culture =

- Author: H. Richard Niebuhr
- Publisher: Harper & Brothers
- Publication date: 1951

Christ and Culture is a 1951 book by H. Richard Niebuhr, in which he gives a history of how Christianity has responded to culture.

== Background ==
H. Richard Niebuhr (1894–1962) was a Protestant theologian who taught at Yale Divinity School. The material in the book was originally delivered as a series of lectures at Austin Presbyterian Theological Seminary in 1949.

== Contents ==
Niebuhr outlines five prevalent viewpoints:

- Christ against culture. For the exclusive Christian, history is the story of a rising church or Christian culture and a dying pagan civilization.
- Christ of culture. For the cultural Christian, history is the story of the Spirit's encounter with nature.
- Christ above culture. For the synthesist, history is a period of preparation under law, reason, gospel, and church for an ultimate communion of the soul with God.
- Christ and culture in paradox. For the dualist, history is the time of struggle between faith and unbelief, a period between the giving of the promise of life and its fulfillment. (Many have regarded the thought of Niebuhr's brother Reinhold as fitting into this category.)
- Christ transforming culture. For the conversionist, history is the story of God's mighty deeds and humanity's response to them. Conversionists live somewhat less "between the times" and somewhat more in the divine "now" than do the followers listed above. Eternity, to the conversionist, focuses less on the action of God before time or life with God after time, and more on the presence of God in time. Hence the conversionist is more concerned with the divine possibility of a present renewal than with conservation of what has been given in creation or preparing for what will be given in a final redemption.

== Legacy ==
Christ and Culture has been critiqued by writers such as John Howard Yoder and Stanley Hauerwas. D. A. Carson wrote a book-length response in 2008, called Christ and Culture Revisited.

In 1999 George Marsden stated that "despite its enormous influence in the past fifty years, I think Niebuhr`s analysis in its present form could be near the end of its usefulness." John G. Stackhouse Jr. suggested in 2002 that "no other book has dominated an entire theological conversation for so long."
