= Bryan Stone =

American theologian (born 1959)

The Reverend Dr. Bryan Stone
- Born: Bryan P. Stone; December 8, 1959 (age 66)

Ecclesiastical career
- Religion: Christianity
- Church: United Methodist Church

Academic background
- Education: Southern Nazarene University; Nazarene Theological Seminary; Southern Methodist University
- Doctoral advisor: Dr. Schubert Ogden
- Influences: John Wesley; Letty Russell; Stanley Hauerwas; Alasdair MacIntyre; James McClendon

Academic work
- Discipline: Theology
- Sub-discipline: Practical theology; systematic theology
- School or tradition: Postliberal theology; Wesleyanism
- Institutions: Azusa Pacific University; Boston University

Bryan P. Stone (born December 8, 1959) is an American theologian who became the Leighton K. Farrell Endowed Dean of Perkins School of Theology at Southern Methodist University in June 2025. He was formerly the Associate Dean for Academic Affairs and the E. Stanley Jones Professor of Evangelism at Boston University School of Theology, and a Co-founder/co-director of the Center for Practical Theology. Stone writes on topics related to both systematic theology and practical theology. He is associated with both postliberalism and Christian pacifism, having been influenced by thinkers such as John Howard Yoder, Stanley Hauerwas, Alasdair MacIntyre, and John Wesley, and in his earliest work with liberation theology and process theology. Stone is also a scholar of theology and film, having written and taught on the subject extensively. His newest book, forthcoming from Routledge Press, is entitled Christianity and Horror Cinema.

== Background ==
Stone holds a Bachelor of Arts degree from Southern Nazarene University, a Master of Divinity degree from the Nazarene Theological Seminary, and a Doctor of Philosophy degree from Southern Methodist University.

He specializes in research related to evangelism, ecclesiology, congregational development, urban and multicultural ministry, popular culture, theology and culture, theology and film, and Wesleyan theology.

Stone was ordained in the Church of the Nazarene and has served as a pastor in the denomination. In 2025 he transferred his ordination credentials to The United Methodist Church. He co-founded "Liberation Community", a multicultural congregation and faith-based non-profit, and served there as pastor and executive director from 1985 to 1992. From 1993 to 1998 he served as Professor of Practical Theology at Azusa Pacific University.

== Selected bibliography ==
Monographs
Christianity and Horror Cinema. Routledge Press (2025).
Finding Faith Today. Cascade Books (2018).

Evangelism After Pluralism. Baker Academic (2018).
A Reader in Ecclesiology. Ashgate Publishing (2012).
Sabbath in the City: Sustaining Urban Pastoral Excellence. Co-authored with Claire Wolfteich. Westminster John Knox Press (2008).
Evangelism After Christendom: The Theology and Practice of Christian Witness. Brazos Press (2007).
Thy Name and Thy Nature is Love. (Edited with Thomas Jay Oord). Kingswood Press (2001).
Faith and Film: Theological Themes at the Cinema. Chalice Press (2000).
Compassionate Ministry: Theological Foundations. Orbis Books (1996).
Effective Faith: A Critical Study of the Christology of Juan Luis Segundo. University Press of America (1994).

Articles and Chapters
“Evangelistic Preaching: Bearing Witness to Beauty,” in Journal for Preachers 42:4 (2019). “Evangelism and Pluralism(s),” in Theologie für die Praxis 43 Jahrgang 2017, 67–83. “Trauma, Reality, and Eucharist,” in Stephanie Arel and Shelly Rambo, eds. Post-Traumatic Public Theology. Palgrave (2016)
“Interfaith Encounters in Popular Culture,” Journal of Religion and Popular Culture 25:3, 403-15 (2013)
“The Ecclesiality of Mission in the Context of Empire,” in Viggo Mortensen and Andreas Østerlund Nielsen, eds. Walk Humbly with the Lord: Church and Mission Engaging Plurality. Grand Rapids: Eerdmans (2011)
“Discipleship and Empire,” in Paul W. Chilcote, ed. Making Disciples in a World Parish. Eugene, OR: Pickwick Publications (2010).
“The Apostles’ Creed in Film,” in Hans-Josef Klauck, et al, The Encyclopedia of the Bible and Its Reception. Berlin: Walter de Gruyter (2009).
“Evil in Film,” in William Blizek, ed. Continuum Companion to Religion and Film. Continuum (2009), 310–322.
“Modern Protestant Approaches to Film (1960-present),” in John Lyden, ed. The Routledge Companion to Religion and Film. Routledge Press (2009).
“The Relevance of Popular Culture for Empirical Research in Practical Theology,” in Hans-Günter Heimbrock and Christopher Schultz, eds. Religion: Immediate Experience and the Mediacy of Research. Göttingen: Vandenhoek & Ruprecht (2007)
“New Church Development,” in Stephen Gunter and Elaine Robinson, eds. Considering the Great Commission: Evangelism and Mission in the Wesleyan Spirit. Nashville: Abingdon (2005).
“Evangelization and Spirituality,” in Philip Sheldrake, ed., The New SCM Press Dictionary of Spirituality. London: SCM Press (2005).
"Online Resources in Theology and Religion," Quarterly Review (Winter, 2004).
"Divine Presence" in Philosophy of Religion: An Introduction to Issues. Thomas Jay Oord, ed. Kansas City: Beacon Hill Press, 2003.
"Going to the Movies, Finding God," Zion's Herald (March/April, 2002)
"Hope and Happy Endings," Review and Expositor 99:1 (Winter), 37–50.
"The Sanctification of Fear: Images of the Religious in Horror Films," Journal of Religion and Film 5:2 (October).
"AI: Blurring the Line Between Human and Machine," Research News and Opportunities in Science and Theology (August), 20.
"The Spirit and the Holy Life," Quarterly Review (Summer, 2001).
"Holiness and Hollywood," The Circuit Rider (May/June, 2000), 24–25.
"Theology and Film in Postmodern Culture: A Dialogue with Forrest Gump and Pulp Fiction." Wesleyan Theological Journal 35:1 (2000).
"Religion and Violence in Popular Film." Journal of Religion and Film 3:1 (1999).
"Reclaiming the 'E' Word." Focus (Winter/Spring, 1999).
"Science and Religious Faith in Contact." Journal of Religion and Film 2:2 (1998).
"Wesleyan Theology, Scriptural Authority, and Homosexuality." Wesleyan Theological Journal (Fall, 1995), 108–138.
"A Prolegomenon to a Contemporary Theology of Urban Ministry." Connection (Fall, 1995).
