= William Henry Willimon =

American Methodist bishop

The Reverend William Henry Willimon
- Born: William Henry Willimon; May 15, 1946 (age 80); Greenville, South Carolina
- Education: Wofford College (B.A.); Yale University (M.Div.); Emory University (S.T.D.)
- Occupation: Bishop
- Spouse: Patricia Parker (m. 1969)
- Children: 2

William Henry Willimon (born May 15, 1946) is a retired American theologian and bishop in the United Methodist Church who served the North Alabama Conference for eight years. He is Professor of the Practice of Christian Ministry and Director of the Doctor of Ministry program at Duke Divinity School. He is former Dean of the Chapel at Duke University and is considered by many as one of America's best-known and most influential preachers. A Pulpit & Pew Research on Pastoral Leadership survey determined that he was one of the two most frequently read writers by pastors in mainline Protestantism alongside the Roman Catholic writer Henri Nouwen.

His books have sold over a million copies. He is also Editor-At-Large of The Christian Century. His 2019 memoir Accidental Preacher was described by Justo L. Gonzalez as "An exceptional example of theology at its best."

== Biography ==
Bishop Willimon, originally from Greenville, South Carolina and raised at Buncombe Street UMC in Greenville, SC, received a Bachelor of Arts from Wofford College in 1968, a Master of Divinity from Yale Divinity School in 1971, and a Doctor of Sacred Theology from Emory University in 1973. He has also received thirteen honorary doctorates, from schools including Colgate, Moravian Seminary, Lafayette, Lehigh, and Westminster. Willimon is a member of Phi Beta Kappa society.

=== Professional life ===
Willimon first served as pastor of United Methodist churches in the North Georgia, South Carolina, and North Carolina Conferences.

From 1976 to 1980, he was on the faculty of Duke Divinity School as Professor of Liturgy and Worship. After serving as pastor of Northside United Methodist Church in Greenville, South Carolina, he became Dean of the Chapel at Duke University in 1984 where he served for twenty years.

He was elected to the episcopacy in 2004 and assigned to the North Alabama Annual Conference. He retired from the episcopacy at the conclusion of the Southeastern Jurisdictional Conference in 2012.

In 2013, he was appointed pastor of the Duke Memorial United Methodist Church in Durham, North Carolina.

He has written over 80 books which have sold over a million copies, been translated into six languages, and won numerous awards. He has collaborated with his friend the theologian Stanley Hauerwas on six books, including their widely influential Resident Aliens: Life in the Christian Colony. The Concise Encyclopedia of Preaching which he wrote with Richard Lischer is widely used as a seminary homiletics text. He was, with Joel B. Green, the general editor of The Wesley Study Bible, published in 2009. His book Pastor: The Theology and Practice of Christian Ministry is used in dozens of seminaries around the world. In 2018, his book Who Lynched Willie Earle? Preaching to Confront Racism was made book of the year by the Evangelical Press Association. With his stress on the wisdom of the church through the centuries, he is sometimes associated with the post-liberal movement and narrative theology.

Willimon has garnered a reputation as an outstanding preacher, being named in a 1996 Baylor University survey along with Billy Graham as one of the 12 best preachers in the English-speaking world. Some of his sermons can be found at A Sermon for Every Sunday.

A former student, Michael A. Turner, says about Willimon in the book A Peculiar Prophet which he co-authored with William F. Malambri: "First and foremost Willimon is a pastoral theologian whose primary message is that the God revealed in Jesus matters for everything in life. Thus his most influential work has been in calling the Church to be a faithful witness to the God revealed to us in the person of Jesus Christ." In the same book, they also say: "Willimon, it seems, never tires of telling the Church just how distinctive our way of life should be because of the particular God who has captured us."

He has served as a trustee of Wofford College, Huntingdon College, Birmingham-Southern College, and Emory University.

=== Personal life ===
He married Patricia Parker on June 7, 1969. They have two children: Harriet and William, both Wofford graduates.

== Publications ==
=== Sole author ===
- Lord of the Congaree: Wade Hampton of South Carolina. Columbia, South Carolina: Sandlapper, 1972
- Between Two Advents. Lima, Ohio: C.S.S. [Clergy Services and Supplies], 1978.
- Eating with Jesus: Biblical Background on the Lord’s Supper. Leaflet 6. Graded Press, 1978.
- The Gifts of God for the People of God: Theological Background on the Lord’s Supper. Leaflet 7. Graded Press, 1978
- Saying YES to Marriage. Valley Forge, Pennsylvania: Judson, 1979.
- Worship as Pastoral Care. Nashville: Abingdon, 1979.
- Word, Water, Wine, and Bread: How Worship Has Changed over the Years. Valley Forge, Pennsylvania: Judson, 1980.
- Remember Who You Are: Baptism, A Model for Christian Life. Nashville: Upper Room, 1980.
- Integrative Preaching: The Pulpit at the Center. Nashville: Abingdon, 1981.
- The Bible, A Sustaining Presence in Worship. Valley Forge, Pennsylvania: Judson, 1981.
- The Way. Nashville: Graded Press of the United Methodist Publishing House, 1981.
- Sunday Dinner: The Lord's Supper and the Christian Life. Nashville: The Upper Room, 1981.
- The Service of God: Christian Work and Worship. Nashville: Abingdon, 1983.
- What’s Right With the Church: A Spirited Statement for Those Who Have Not Given Up on the Church and for Those Who Have. San Francisco: Harper & Row, 1985; New Orleans: Insight, 1998.
- (Lesson analysis with Charles M. Laymon) The International Lesson Annual, 1984-1985, edited by Horace R. Weaver. Nashville: Abingdon Press, 1984.
- (Lesson analysis) The International Lesson Annual, 1985-1986, edited by Horace R. Weaver. Nashville: Abingdon Press, 1985.
- Sighing for Eden: Sin, Evil, and the Christian Faith. Nashville: Abingdon, 1985.
- With Glad and Generous Hearts: A Personal Look at Sunday Worship. Nashville: The Upper Room, 1986.
- (Lesson analysis) The International Lesson Annual, 1986-1987, edited by Horace R. Weaver. Nashville: Abingdon Press, 1986.
- Promises of Marriage: A Guide for Couples Seeking Advice While on the Brink of Matrimony, or for Couples Renewing Their Love. Nashville: Discipleship Resources, 1987.
- (Lesson analysis) The International Lesson Annual, 1987-1988, edited by Horace R. Weaver. Nashville: Abingdon Press, 1987.
- Acts. Interpretation: A Bible Commentary for Teaching and Preaching. Atlanta: John Knox, 1988.
- Clergy and Laity Burnout'. Nashville: Abingdon Press, 1989.
- Making Disciples: A New Approach to Confirmation. Confirmand's Journal and Mentor's Guide'. Inner Grove Heights, Minnesota: Logos, 1990.
- Making Disciples: A New Approach to Confirmation. Coordinator's Guide'. Inner Grove Heights, Minnesota: Logos, 1990.
- Why I Am a United Methodist. Nashville: Abingdon Press, 1990.
- (Lesson analysis with Pat McGeachy) The International Lesson Annual, 1991-92, edited by Horace R. Weaver. Nashville: Abingdon Press, 1991.
- Good-bye High School, Hello College. Nashville: Dimensions for Living, 1992.
- (editor). The International Lesson Annual, 1992-93. Lesson Analysis by Pat McGeachy. Nashville: Abingdon, 1992.
- (editor). The International Lesson Annual, 1993-94. Lesson Analysis by Pat McGeachy. Nashville: Abingdon, 1993.
- Advent/Christmas: Interpreting the Lessons of the Church Year. Proclamation 5, Series B. Minneapolis: Fortress, 1993.
- (editor with Patricia P. Willimon). The International Lesson Annual, 1994-95. Lesson Analysis by Pat McGeachy. Nashville: Abingdon, 1994.
- The Intrusive Word: Preaching to the Unbaptized. Grand Rapids, Michigan: Eerdmans, 1994.
- On Your Own But Not Alone: Life After College. Nashville: Dimensions for Living, 1995.
- Calling and Character: Virtues of the Ordained Life. Nashville: Abingdon, 2000.
- Pastor: The Theology and Practice of Ordained Ministry. Nashville: Abingdon, 2002.
- (editor) The Sunday after Tuesday: College Pulpits Respond to 9/11. Nashville: Abingdon, 2002.
- A Peculiar Prophet: William H. Willimon and the Art of Preaching, edited by Michael A. Turner and William F. Malambri, III. Nashville: Abingdon, 2004.
- Sinning Like a Christian: A New Look at the Seven Deadly Sins. Nashville: Abingdon, 2005.
- Conversations with Barth on Preaching. Nashville: Abingdon, 2006.
- United Methodist Beliefs: A Brief Introduction. Louisville: John Knox, 2007.
- Who Will Be Saved? Nashville: Abingdon, 2008.
- A Guide to Preaching and Leading Worship. Louisville, Kentucky: Westminster John Knox, 2008.
- This We Believe: The Core of Wesleyan Faith and Practice. Nashville: Abingdon, 2010.
- Preaching Master Class: Lessons from Will Willimon’s Five-Minute Preaching Workshop, edited by Noel Snyder. Eugene: Cascade, 2010.
- The Best of Will Willimon: Acting Up in Jesus’ Name. Nashville: Abingdon, 2012.
- Bishop: The Art of Questioning Authority by an Authority in Question. Nashville: Abingdon, 2012.
- Incorporation: A Novel. Eugene, OR: Cascade, 2012.
- Incarnation: The Surprising Overlap of Heaven and Earth. Nashville: Abingdon, 2013.
- Sinning Like a Christian: A New Look at the 7 Deadly Sins. Nashville: Abingdon, 2013.
- Fear of the Other: No Fear in Love. Nashville: Abingdon, 2016
- Pastor: The Theology and Practice of Ordained Ministry, Revised Edition. Nashville: Abingdon, 2016.
- I’m Not From Here: A Parable. Eugene, OR: Wipf and Stock Publishers, 2017.
- Who Lynched Willie Earle?: Preaching to Confront Racism. Nashville: Abingdon, 2017.
- Accidental Preacher: A Memoir. Grand Rapids, MI: Eerdmans, 2019.
- Aging: Growing Old in Church. Ada, MI: Baker Academic, 2020.
- Stories by Willimon. Nashville: Cokesbury, 2020.
- Leading with the Sermon: Preaching as Leadership. Minneapolis: Fortress Press, 2020.
- The Gospel for the Person Who Has Everything. Brewster: Paraclete Press, 2020.
- God Turned Toward Us: The ABCs of Christian Faith. Nashville: Abingdon, 2021.
- Don't Look Back: Methodist Hope for What Comes Next. Nashville: Abingdon, 2022.
- Changing My Mind. Nashville: Abingdon, 2024
- The Church We Carry. Nashville: Abingdon, 2025

=== Collaborative efforts ===
- (with Patricia Willimon and Hoyt Simmons) Turning the World Upside Down: The Story of Sarah and Angelina Grimke. Columbia, South Carolina: Sandlapper, 1972.
- (with John H. Westerhoff, III) Liturgy and Learning Through the Life Cycle. Akron, Ohio: OSL, 1980.
- (with Harriet Willimon Cabell) Family, Friends, and Other Funny People: Memories of Growing Up Southern. Orangeburg, South Carolina: Sandlapper, 1980.
- (with Charles M. Laymon) The International Lesson Annual, 1984–1985, edited by Horace R. Weaver. Nashville: Abingdon Press, 1984.
- (with Pat McGeachy) The International Lesson Annual, 1988–1989, edited by Horace R. Weaver. Nashville: Abingdon Press, 1988.
- (with Pat McGeachy) The International Lesson Annual, 1991–1992, edited by Horace R. Weaver. Nashville: Abingdon Press, 1991.
- (with Stanley Hauerwas) Preaching to Strangers. Louisville: Westminster/John Knox, 1992.
- (with Patricia P. Willimon, eds.) The International Lesson Annual, 1994–95. Nashville: Abingdon, 1994.
- (with Thomas H. Naylor) The Abandoned Generation: Rethinking Higher Education. Grand Rapids, Michigan: Eerdmans, 1995.
- (with Thomas H. Naylor) Downsizing the U.S.A.. Grand Rapids, Michigan: Eerdmans, 1997.
- (with Stanley Hauerwas) Resident Aliens. Tokyo: Kyo Bun Kwan, 1999.
- (with Martin B. Copenhaver and Anthony B. Robinson) Good News in Exile: Three Pastors Offer a Hopeful Vision for the Church. Grand Rapids, Michigan: Eerdmans, 1999.
- (with Stanley Hauerwas) The Holy Spirit. Nashville: Abingdon, 2015.

== Ordained ministry ==
- Pastor, Level Creek UMC, Buford, GA, 1971
- Associate Pastor, Broad St. UMC, Clinton, SC, 1971–73
- Pastor, Trinity UMC, North Myrtle Beach, SC, 1973–76
- Pastor, Northside UMC, Greenville, SC, 1980–84
- Professor, Duke Divinity School, Duke University, Durham, NC, 1984-2004 (one of the youngest professors in the history of Duke Divinity School)
- Dean, Duke Chapel, Duke University, Durham, NC, 1984-2004
- Bishop, North Alabama Annual Conference, The United Methodist Church, 2004-2012
- Professor of the Practice of Christian Ministry, Duke Divinity School, Duke University, Durham, NC, 2012-
- Pastor, Duke Memorial UMC, Durham, NC, 2014

== See also ==
- List of bishops of the United Methodist Church
