= Frank Lentricchia =

Frank Lentricchia (born 1940) is an American literary critic, novelist, and film teacher. He received his Ph.D. and M.A. from Duke University in 1966 and 1963 respectively after receiving a B.A. from Utica College in 1962. Lentricchia retired from Duke University, where he was a professor in the Program in Literature.

== Works ==
=== Academic ===
- The Gaiety of Language : An Essay On The Radical Poetics Of W. B. Yeats And Wallace Stevens (1968)
- Robert Frost: Modern Poetics and the Landscapes of Self (1975)
- Robert Frost: A Bibliography, 1913 – 1974 (1976) with Melissa Christensen Lentricchia
- After the New Criticism (1980) ISBN 978-0-226-47198-3
- Criticism and Social Change (1983) ISBN 978-0-226-47200-3
- Ariel and the Police: Michel Foucault, William James, Wallace Stevens (1989)
- New Essays on White Noise (1991) editor, with Emory Elliot, on White Noise by Don DeLillo
- Introducing Don DeLillo (1991) editor
- Modernist Quartet (1994)
- Critical Terms for Literary Study (1995) with Thomas McLaughlin ISBN 978-0-226-47203-4
- Dissent from the Homeland: Essays After September 11 (2003) editor, with Stanley Hauerwas
- Close Reading: The Reader (2003) editor, with Andrew Dubois
- Crimes of Art and Terror (2003) with Jody McAuliffe ISBN 978-0-226-47205-8

=== Non-Fiction ===
- The Edge of Night. A Confession (1994)

=== Fiction ===
- Johnny Critelli and The Knifemen: Two Novels (1996)
- The Music of the Inferno (1999) novel
- Lucchesi and the Whale (2001)
- The Book of Ruth (2005)
- The Italian Actress (2010)
- The Sadness of Antonioni (2011) ISBN 9781438439129
- The Portable Lentricchia (2012) ISBN 978-1-59954-040-5

==== Eliot Conte Novels ====
- The Accidental Pallbearer (2012) ISBN 978-1-61219-171-3
- The Dog Killer of Utica (2014)
- The Morelli Thing (2015)
