= James Gustafson =

American theological ethicist (1925–2021)

- Born: James Moody Gustafson; December 2, 1925; Norway, Michigan, US
- Died: January 15, 2021 (aged 95); Albuquerque, New Mexico, US

Academic background
- Education: Uppsala University
- Influences: H. Richard Niebuhr

Academic work
- Institutions: Yale University; University of Chicago; Emory University
- Doctoral students: Nigel Biggar; Lisa Sowle Cahill; Stanley Hauerwas; William Schweiker

James M. Gustafson (December 3, 1925 – January 15, 2021) was an American theological ethicist.

== Biography ==
Gustafson received an honorary doctorate by the Faculty of Theology at Uppsala University in 1985. He has held teaching posts at Yale Divinity School and the Department of Religious Studies (1955–1972), the University of Chicago as professor of theological ethics in the Divinity School (1972–1988), and Emory University as the Henry R. Luce Professor of Humanities and Comparative Studies. He retired in 1998 after 43 years of teaching and research, after being Woodruff Professor of Comparative Studies and of Religion in the Emory College and Graduate School of Arts & Sciences. He received the Lifetime Achievement Award for "creative and lasting contributions to the field of Christian ethics" on January 7, 2011, at the annual meeting of the Society of Christian Ethics in New Orleans.

Some of his prominent students include Stanley Hauerwas, William Schweiker, Lisa Sowle Cahill, William C. Spohn, Martha E. Stortz, and Barry J. Stenger.

== Bibliography ==
- Christ and the Moral Life (1968) Harper and Row.
- On being responsible: Issues in personal ethics (1968) (Edited by) Harper Forum Books.
- Can Ethics Be Christian? (1975) University of Chicago Press.
- Protestant and Roman Catholic Ethics: Prospects for Rapprochement (1978) University of Chicago Press.
- Ethics from a Theocentric perspective, volume 1 "Theology and ethics" (1981) University of Chicago Press.
- Ethics from a Theocentric perspective, volume 2 "Ethics and Theology" (1992) University of Chicago Press.
- An Examined Faith: The Grace of Self-Doubt (2004) Augsburg Fortress.
- Moral Discernment in the Christian Life: Essays in Theological Ethics (2007), part of the Library of Theological Ethics collection. Westminster John Knox Press.
