= Ekklesia Project =

The Ekklesia Project is an ecumenical Christian group consisting of a network of Christians from across the various denominations to promote a more active and God-centered faith. Membership consists of various academics, clergy, and laity from this broad range of Christians.

== Formation ==
The Ekklesia Project officially began with a conference in Chicago, Illinois in 1998. They have since held an annual three-day conference in Chicago during the month of July. There are officially 841 endorsing members as of December 6, 2007.

== Beliefs ==
Of God: The Ekklesia Project claims belief in the Triune God traditional Christian faith, and that it is in the Trinity that the origination and goal of all things subsides. Also, that through Jesus Christ they "are to give [their] allegiance to God." Members affirm that "real power and effectiveness lie in God's hands."

Of Worship: the most fundamental and essential form of worship of the Triune God, to the Ekklesia Project, is that of communal origin. Which is seen as guided by the Holy Spirit, and to be incorporated into all aspects of daily life with the goal to always glorify God. Worship is embodied by works of mercy, prayer, and participation in member's local church.

Of the Church: the Church is to follow the example of Jesus and never sacrifice the integrity of the Church by compromising with institutions and allegiances of this world. The Ekklesia Project defines the Church as Christ's gathered Body, the congregations of believers committed to the life and words of Jesus by partaking in communal worship and "disciplined service". It is through the Church that God's wisdom is being made known to the world. This Christian Church transcends national, institutional, cultural, socio-economical, and denominational borders and divisions. The Ekklesia Project seeks "to restore the bond of ecclesial unity and solidarity" that is seen as "always under the threat from the powers and principalities of the present age."

Some of the emphases of the Project derive from the narrative theology, or postliberal, movement among Protestant thinkers.

== Mission ==
The Ekklesia Project seeks "to overcome the dominant cultures limited vision of faith as merely a private or personal matter." The organization testifies that they share a "common commitment to the Church as Christ's gathered Body", where communal worship is embodied through service and discipleship. They pledge to live by trust and prayer to assist the Church's life as a real-world community that demonstrates Jesus' "person, priorities, and practices... through the gathered body of Christ." The organization also seeks to help establish peace and reveal that there are alternatives to violence through listening, learning, and practicing mercy. The Project means to "challenge communities and practices that have minimized or diluted the church's obligation to be a 'light of the nations'". By providing a place for Christian dialogue to happen in an open and friendly atmosphere; The Ekklesia Project seeks to maintain critical conversation that will lead to the building of the Body of Christ, and to do so for a variety of audiences. Through various publications, conversation, retreats, gatherings, and worship are the means by which they seek promote a more "radical discipleship in local congregations and beyond".

== Works ==
The Ekklesia Project has put out fourteen pamphlets to date and has launched two book series. The first series is called Christian Practices for Everyday Life published by Brazos Press. The second is the Academic Series which is published by Wm. B. Eerdmans Publishing. The literature is intended to educate and promote to the readers The Project's vision of discipleship and ecclesial unity.

== Bibliography ==
- Laytham, D. Brent, ed., God Is Not: religious, nice, "one of us", an American, a capitalist. Grand Rapids: Brazos press, 2004.
- Thayer, Joseph. Thayer's Greek-English Lexicon of the New Testament, Peabody: Hendrickson Publishers, 1996
- Merriam-Webster Online Dictionary, s.v. "project," http://www.merriamwebster.com/dictionary/project(accessed December 6, 2007)
- The Ekklesia Project, "Who we are." http://ekklesiaproject.org/index.php?option=com_content&task=view&id=15&Itemid=34%5B%5D (accessed December 2, 2007)
- The Ekklesia Project, "Who we are: a declaration." http://ekklesiaproject.org/index.php?option=com_content&task=view&id=16&Itemid=35 (accessed December 2, 2007)
