= William Schweiker =

American theological ethicist

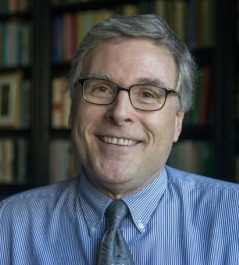
- William Schweiker in 2016
- Born: December 29, 1953 (age 72)
- Citizenship: United States

Academic background
- Doctoral advisor: James Gustafson and David Tracy

Academic work
- Discipline: Christian Ethics, Theology
- Institutions: University of Chicago

William Schweiker is an American theological ethicist. He is the Edward L. Ryerson Distinguished Service Professor of Theological Ethics at the University of Chicago. His research focuses on globalization as an ethical problem, hermeneutic philosophy, theological humanism, the history of ethics, and comparative religious ethics.

== Biography ==
Schweiker was born on December 29, 1953, in Des Moines, Iowa. He earned his B.A. from Simpson College in 1976, his M. Div. from Duke Divinity School in 1980, and his PhD from the University of Chicago Divinity School in 1985. After graduating, he accepted an assistant professorship in theology and ethics at the University of Iowa. In 1989, he returned to the University of Chicago as assistant professor, was made full professor in 2000, and appointed the Edward L. Ryerson Distinguished Service Professor of Theological Ethics in 2007. That year, he also became director of the Martin Marty Center for the Advanced Study of Religion at the University of Chicago Divinity School.

He has been guest professor at Uppsala University, where he received an honorary doctorate, and Mercator Professor at the University of Heidelberg, and lectured in China, South Korea, and South Africa. In 2015/16 Schweiker served as president of the Society of Christian Ethics.

Professor Schweiker is an ordained minister in the United Methodist Church and is Theologian in Residence at the First United Methodist Church at the Chicago Temple.

== Academic work ==
Schweiker's scholarship focuses on the ways in which humanity is vulnerable to new powers in contemporary times and the responsibility these powers and vulnerabilities generate for human agents. His work crosses the disciplinary lines of ethics, systematic theology, and hermeneutic philosophy. He has been recognized as a leader in the development of “Theological Humanism” and is the author of numerous books, with translations into Korean, Chinese, and essays in German. His Theological Ethics and Global Dynamics: In the Time of Many Worlds (2004) was nominated for the prestigious Grawemeyer Award in religion (2005). In this text, Schweiker describes the cultural dynamics of a globalizing world, which he insists are “intrinsically bound to the representational, evaluative, and so motivational forces working on and in” human agents. As such, 'globality' presents us with a new a moral space, a new depiction of moral reality that requires us to rethink human power and our relationship with the nonhuman world without undermining human dignity and moral responsibility.

Schweiker is editor of the Blackwell Companion to Religious Ethics, a collection of essays written by internationally renowned scholars of religion. In the introduction, Schweiker describes the volume as a companion meant to "aid in understanding and addressing the moral beliefs, value, and practices of the world’s religions.” He is also co-editor (with of David A Clarimont, Maria Antonaccio, and Elizabeth Bucar) of the "Encyclopedia of Religious Ethics," which is currently in press with Wiley-Blackwell Publishers.

Schweiker's scholarship in recent years has remained attentive to the theological and ethical questions related to global dynamics, comparative ethics, the possibilities of a renewed and robust religious humanism, and the ethics of responsibility concerned with the respecting and enhancing the integrity of life. He is a frequent lecturer and visiting professor at universities around the world and has been involved in several collaborative international projects. This includes his role as principal investigator (together with Günter Thomas, Ruhr-University Bochum) of the "Enhancing Life Project", an interdisciplinary research project that brought together scholars from Germany, Iraq, Israel, Taiwan, the United Kingdom, and the USA together to discuss and study the essential aspirations of human beings and the expansion of human power in contemporary times. The project was supported by a generous grant from the Templeton Foundation.

== Books ==
- Mimetic Reflections: A Study in Hermeneutics, Theology and Ethics (1990)
- Responsibility and Christian Ethics (1995)
- Power, Value and Conviction: Theological Ethics in the Postmodern Age (1998)
- Theological Ethics and Global Dynamics: In the Time of Many Worlds (2004)
- Blackwell Companion to Religious Ethics (2005) [Editor]
- Religion and the Human Future: An Essay in Theological Humanism (2008, with David E. Klemm)
- Dust that Breathes: Christian Faith and the New Humanisms (2010).
- Religious Ethics: Meaning and Method (2020, with David A. Clairmont)

== Selected Articles and Chapters ==
- “Responsibility and Moral Realities,” Studies in Christian Ethics 22. no. 4 (2009): 1-25.
- “Global Problems, Global Responsibilities: Accepting and Assigning Liabilities for Environmental Harms,” Journal of Law, Philosophy and Culture, 3, no. 1 (2009): 101-120.
- "Responsibility and the Attunement of Conscience." The Journal of Religion 93, no. 4 (2013): 461-72.
- “A Response to ‘Participation: A Religious Worldview’ by James M. Gustafson,” The Journal of Religious Ethics 44:1 (Mar 2016): 176-185.
- “Humanity and the Global Future,” The Journal of the Society of Christian Ethics 36:2 (Fall/Winter 2016): 3-24.
- “Vulnerability and the Moral Life: Theological and Ethical Reflections” in Exploring Vulnerability, eds. H. Springhart and G. Thomas (Göttingen: Vandenhoeck & Ruprecht, 2017), 109-122.
- “The Destiny Of Creation: Theological Ethical Reflections On Laudato Si’” for The Journal of Religious Ethics 46. 3 (2018): 479-496.
- “God and the Human Good” in God and the Moral Life, eds. Myriam Renaud and Joshua Daniel (New York, NY: Routledge, 2018), 47-62.
- “Humanizing Capital: Thoughts on a Sustainable and Human Future” in Asia-Pacific Journal of Theological Studies 6 (May 2017): 19-32.
- “The Future of Reformations Past” in Evangelische Theologie 79.2 (2019): 86-99.
- “Technology and Christian Theological Humanism” in “An East-West Conversation on Homo Technicus and Religious Humanism” in Christian Social Ethics, (46: 2020): 275-308.
- “Christian Realism And Moral Responsibility” in Companion to Reinhold Neibuhr, ed. R. Lovin and J. Mauldin (Oxford, forthcoming 2020).

== Honors ==
On January 31, 2014, Schweiker received an honorary doctorate from the Faculty of Theology at Uppsala University for his "insightful studies of the epistemology of morality, especially his reinterpretation of the conscience in the light of post-modern criticism." His work is the subject of Responsibility and the Enhancement of Life: Essays in Honor of William Schweiker.
