= Jeffrey Stout =

American religious studies scholar (born 1950)

- Born: Jeffrey Lee Stout; September 11, 1950 (age 76); Trenton, New Jersey, US
- Spouse: Sally Starkey (m. 1973)

Academic background
- Education: Brown University; Princeton University
- Thesis: Religion, Morality, and the Justification of Moral Knowledge (1976)
- Influences: Robert Brandom; Richard Rorty

Academic work
- Discipline: Religious studies
- School or tradition: American pragmatism; new historicism
- Institutions: Princeton University
- Notable works: Ethics After Babel (1989); Democracy and Tradition (2003)

Jeffrey Lee Stout (born September 11, 1950) is an American religious studies scholar who is Professor Emeritus of Religion at Princeton University. Before his retirement from the classroom in 2018, he taught in the Department of Religion and was affiliated with the Department of Philosophy, the Department of Politics, the Center for the Study of Religion, and the Center for Human Values. His works focus on religion, ethics, politics, interpretation, and cinema. He served as president of the American Academy of Religion in 2007.

== Life and career ==
Stout was born on September 11, 1950, in Trenton, New Jersey. He was active in the civil rights movement and the opposition to United States involvement in the Vietnam War. While attending Brown University, he led a student strike, managed the Rhode Island Draft Information Center, and established a student magazine.

After his graduation from Brown in 1972, Stout began his graduate work at Princeton University, joined the faculty there in 1975, and completed the doctorate in Religion in 1976. While at Princeton, Stout chaired the Department of Religion (1992–99, 2002–03) and the Committee for Film Studies (2011–15). He received Princeton University’s Graduate Mentoring Award in 2009 and the President's Award for Distinguished Teaching a year later.

His two best-known books, both of which received the American Academy of Religion Award for Excellence, are Ethics After Babel (1989) and Democracy and Tradition (2004). His most recent book, Blessed Are the Organized: Grassroots Democracy in America (2010), investigates ways in which citizens' groups acquire and exercise power.

Stout delivered a series of six Gifford Lectures, "Religion Unbound: Ideals and Powers from Cicero to King", at the University of Edinburgh in May 2017 and is currently expanding the lectures into two books, the first of which is a study of Cicero and his conceptual legacy. Stout's Kellogg Lecture in Jurisprudence at the Library of Congress (October 2022) addressed threats to democratic liberty posed by recent Supreme Court rulings and the attack on the US Capitol on January 6, 2021.

Stout's presentations on religion and cinema include his Stone Lectures at Princeton Theological Seminary (2007) and the American Lectures in the History of Religions (hosted at five universities in North Carolina in 2019). He served as a trustee of Anthology Film Archives from 2009 to 2011.

== Theory ==
Stout holds that modern democracy is best understood as an evolving tradition, which has made ample room for a wide variety of religious and nonreligious voices. This tradition is secular in the sense not requiring agreement on a single set of religious assumptions and pluralist in the sense of accommodating diverse forms of reasoning. Stout criticizes "new traditionalists" such as Alasdair MacIntyre and Stanley Hauerwas and "liberal secularists" such as Richard Rorty and John Rawls for oversimplifying how democratic discourse functions.

Many of Stout's papers are devoted to assessing theories of truth, knowledge, meaning, and value associated with the school of philosophy known as American pragmatism, as represented in the writings of John Dewey, Jane Addams, Richard Rorty, Richard Bernstein, Robert Brandom, and Cornel West.

Stout's lectures on film are concerned with "the cinematic sacred," a genre represented in works by Alfred Hitchcock, Yasujiro Ozu, Julie Dash, Stan Brakhage, and others.

Academic offices
Preceded by Helga Nowotny	Gifford Lecturer at the University of Edinburgh; 2016–2017; Served alongside: Richard English	Succeeded by Elaine Howard Ecklund
Preceded by Jeremy Waldron	Gifford Lecturer at the University of Edinburgh; 2016–2017; Served alongside: Richard English	Succeeded by Agustín Fuentes
Professional and academic associations
Preceded by Diana L. Eck	President of the American Academy of Religion; 2007	Succeeded by Emilie Townes
