= Julian Hartt =

American Methodist theologian (1911–2010)

The Reverend Julian Hartt
- Born: June 13, 1911; Selby, South Dakota, US
- Died: November 29, 2010 (aged 99); Greenfield, Massachusetts, US
- Spouses: Neva (m. 1935, died); Elinor Hartt

Ecclesiastical career
- Religion: Christianity (Methodist)
- Church: United Methodist Church

Academic background
- Education: Dakota Wesleyan University; Garrett Biblical Institute; Northwestern University; Yale University

Academic work
- Discipline: Religious studies; theology
- Sub-discipline: Philosophical theology
- Institutions: Yale University; University of Virginia
- Influenced: Stanley Hauerwas

Julian Norris Hartt (1911–2010) was an American Methodist philosophical theologian.

Hart was born in Selby, South Dakota, on June 13, 1911, the son of the Methodist minister Albert Hartt and Laura Beals Hartt. He received a Bachelor of Arts degree in philosophy and psychology from Dakota Wesleyan University, a Bachelor of Divinity degree from Garrett Biblical Institute in 1937, a Master of Arts degree from Northwestern University in 1938, and a Doctor of Philosophy degree in philosophy and theology from Yale University in 1940.

After teaching at Berea College for three years, Hartt returned to Yale University, serving as an associate professor from 1943 to 1953 and as the Noah Porter Professor of Philosophy and Theology from 1953 to 1972. He chaired Yale's department of religion from 1956 to 1964 and its department of religious studies from 1967 to 1972. From 1972 to 1981, he was the William Kenan Jr. Professor of Religious Studies at the University of Virginia.

Hartt died on November 29, 2010, in Greenfield, Massachusetts.
