= Resident Aliens =

1989 book by Stanley Hauerwas and William H. Willimon

Resident Aliens: Life in the Christian Colony
- Author: Stanley Hauerwas; William Willimon
- Language: English
- Subject: Christianity
- Publisher: Abingdon Press
- Publication date: 1989
- Publication place: United States
- Pages: 175
- ISBN: 978-0-687-36159-5
- Dewey Decimal: 261.1
- LC Class: BR115.C8 H393
- Followed by: Where Resident Aliens Live

Resident Aliens: Life in the Christian Colony is a 1989 book authored by the theologians Stanley Hauerwas and William Willimon. The book discusses the nature of the church and its relationship to surrounding culture. It argues that churches should focus on developing Christian life and community rather than attempting to reform secular culture. Hauerwas and Willimon reject the idea that America or any other country is a Christian nation, instead believing that Christians should see themselves as "resident aliens" in a foreign land, using the metaphor of a colony to describe the church. Instead of conforming the world to the gospel or the gospel to the world, they believe that Christians should focus on conforming to the gospel themselves.

Hauerwas and Willimon proceed to discuss ethics and the relationship between Christianity and politics, critiquing the notion that Christians, or the church as a whole, should attempt to transform secular governments or get overly involved in politics in an attempt to change society. Instead, the role of Christians is to live lives which model the love of Christ. Rather than trying to convince others to change their ethics or redefine their ethics, Christians should model a new set of ethics which are grounded in the life, death, and resurrection of Christ. Churches, therefore, should be places which help cultivate and grow disciples.

In 1996 a sequel was published entitled Where Resident Aliens Live: Exercises for Christian Practice (ISBN 0-687-01605-3).
