= George Lindbeck =

American theologian (1923–2018)

- Born: George Arthur Lindbeck; March 10, 1923; Luoyang, China
- Died: January 8, 2018 (aged 94); Florida, United States
- Spouse: Violette Lindbeck

Academic background
- Education: Gustavus Adolphus College; Yale University
- Thesis: Is Duns Scotus an Essentialist? (1955)
- Doctoral advisor: Robert Lowry Calhoun
- Other advisors: Étienne Gilson; Paul Vignaux
- Influences: Thomas Aquinas; Karl Barth; Hans Frei; Wayne Proudfoot; Ludwig Wittgenstein

Academic work
- Discipline: Theology
- School or tradition: Lutheranism; postliberalism
- Institutions: Yale University
- Doctoral students: Kathryn Tanner; Karen Kilby
- Notable students: Guy Erwin; Cyril O'Regan; William Placher
- Notable works: The Nature of Doctrine (1984)
- Influenced: Stanley Grenz; William Placher; George R. Sumner

George Arthur Lindbeck (March 10, 1923 – January 8, 2018) was an American Lutheran theologian. He was best known as an ecumenicist and as one of the fathers of postliberal theology.

== Early life and education ==
Lindbeck was born on March 10, 1923, in Luoyang, China, the son of American Lutheran missionaries. Raised in that country and in Korea for the first seventeen years of his life, he was often sickly as a child and found himself often isolated from the world around himself.

He attended Gustavus Adolphus College, graduating with a Bachelor of Arts degree in 1943. He went on to do graduate work at Yale University, receiving his Bachelor of Divinity degree in 1946. After his undergraduate work he spent a year at the Pontifical Institute of Medieval Studies with Étienne Gilson in Toronto then two years at the École Pratique des Hautes Études with Paul Vignaux in Paris. He earned his Doctor of Philosophy degree from Yale in 1955 concentrating on medieval studies, delivering a dissertation on the Franciscan theologian Duns Scotus.

== Career ==
Lindbeck first gained attention as a medievalist and as a participant in ecumenical discussions in academia and the church. He was a "delegate observer" to the Second Vatican Council. After that time, he made important contributions to ecumenical dialogue, especially between Lutherans and Roman Catholics. From 1968 to 1987 he was a member of the Joint Commission between the Vatican and Lutheran World Federation. In 1994, Lindbeck spoke at length about his memories of Vatican II with George Weigel, and a transcript of his interview with Weigel was published in the December 1994 edition of First Things.

His best-known work is The Nature of Doctrine: Religion and Theology in a Postliberal Age, published in 1984. It was widely influential and is one of the key works in the formation and founding of postliberal theology.

He was appointed to the Yale Divinity School faculty in 1952 before his studies were finished, and remained there until his retirement in 1993. His book The Church in a Postliberal Age was published in 2002.

He was a fellow of the American Academy of Arts and Sciences, and a recipient of the Wilbur Cross Medal from the Yale Graduate School Alumni Association.

Lindbeck died on January 8, 2018.

== Selected works ==
- Lindbeck, George A. (1984). The Nature of Doctrine: Religion and Theology in a Postliberal Age. Louisville: Westminster John Knox Press. ISBN 9780664246181
- Lindbeck, George A. (2003). The Church in a Postliberal Age. Grand Rapids, MI: William B. Eerdmans. ISBN 9780802839954
