= Postliberal theology =

Christian theological movement

Postliberal theology (often called narrative theology) is a Christian theological movement that focuses on a narrative presentation of the Christian faith as regulative for the development of a coherent systematic theology. Therefore, Christianity is an overarching story, with its own embedded culture, grammar, and practices, which can be understood only with reference to Christianity's own internal logic.

The movement became popular in the late twentieth century, primarily among scholars associated with Yale Divinity School. Supporters challenge assumptions of the Enlightenment and modernity, such as foundationalism and the belief in universal rationality, by speaking in terms of Ludwig Wittgenstein's concept of language-games. They argue that the biblical narrative challenges the dominant presuppositions of liberalism and liberal Christianity, including its emphasis on the autonomous individual.

== History ==
Postliberal theology arose amongst scholars who either taught or studied at Yale Divinity School, such as George Lindbeck, Hans Wilhelm Frei, and alumnus Stanley Hauerwas. It is sometimes referred to as the "Yale school" or "narrative theology." The term "postliberal theology" came about shortly after the publication of Lindbeck's The Nature of Doctrine: Religion and Theology in a Postliberal Age (1984).

The movement is theologically influenced by Karl Barth, Thomas Aquinas, and to some extent, the nouvelle théologie of French Catholics such as Henri de Lubac. The clear philosophical influence, however, was Ludwig Wittgenstein's philosophy of language, the moral philosophy of Alasdair MacIntyre, and the sociological insights of Clifford Geertz and Peter Berger on the nature of communities. Philosophers of science such as Thomas Kuhn and literary theorists such as Erich Auerbach also influenced the new approach.

This movement has influenced other movements, such as radical orthodoxy, scriptural reasoning, paleo-orthodoxy, the emerging church movement, and postliberal expressions of evangelical Protestantism and Roman Catholicism. Its ecumenical spirit originates from Lindbeck's work, which was partly animated by his involvement as a Lutheran observer at the Second Vatican Council.

== Theological platform ==
Partly a reaction to the trends of theological liberalism, postliberal theology roots rationality not in the certainty of the individual thinking subject (cogito ergo sum, "I think, therefore I am") but in the language and culture of a living tradition of communal life. The postliberals argue that the Christian faith be equated with neither the religious feelings of romanticism nor the propositions of a rationalist or fundamentalist approach to religion and theology. Rather, the Christian faith is understood as a culture and a language, in which doctrines are likened to a "depth grammar" for the first-order language and culture (practices, skills, habits) of the church that is historically shaped by the continuous, regulated reading of the scriptural narrative over time. Thus, in addition to a critique of theological liberalism, and an emphasis upon the Bible, there is also a stress upon tradition, and upon the language, culture, and intelligibility intrinsic to the Christian community. As a result, postliberal theologies are often oriented around the scriptural narrative as a script to be performed, understand orthodox dogmas (esp. the creeds) as depth-grammars for Christian life, and see such scriptural and traditional grammars as a resource for both Christian self-critique and culture critique.

The early postliberals followed Karl Barth's view that the best apologetic is a good systematic, and as such believed that Christians should "not engage in systematic apologetics. Postliberal theologians will make ad hoc connections with the philosophy or art or miscellaneous experience of the cultures around them, but they do not believe that any non-Christian framework, philosophical or cultural, sets the context in which Christian claims must be defended." However, later postliberals have qualified this aversion and have seriously tempered its initial concerns over both apologetics and metaphysics. (Note: For example, see Griffiths 1991 and Hauerwas 2002.) In this way, postliberal theologies have largely replicated earlier 20th-century debates surrounding the notion of the "analogy of being" (cf. Hans Urs von Balthasar, The Theology of Karl Barth). Unlike the pluralistic liberal trend preceding it, postliberal theology also tends to stress the dissimilarities between religious worldviews, and will often strike out against dominant cultural trends.

Scriptural interpretation remains fundamental for postliberal theology. There are at least four key exegetical differences between liberal and postliberal theology. First, liberal interpretation of Scripture is done with a preoccupation with the historical context, whereas postliberal interpretation is "an act of imagination", interpreting the text with the needs of the reading sub-community in the forefront. Liberal theology deals with aiming to understand the text as it would have applied to the past. Using a non-foundationalist approach, postliberal interpretation aims to interpret the text as it should be applied now and in the future. Second, liberal theologians stress dependence on unbiased reason to ensure finding the objective meaning of the text. Postliberal theologians, however, base their approach on the position that reading is impossible without imposing subjective interpretation of the text by the reader, so that such a notion of objective reading disintegrates. Third, "we read texts as bodied interpreters fully situated in some body politic." That is, each and every meaning is, to a certain degree, relative to the reader and their own set of contexts. Finally, because reading is always done with a concern for the sub-community, postliberal interpretation always contains a normative element, encouraging an active response. Liberal interpretation, on the other hand, centre around time- and situation-independent truths that do not necessarily impel the reader to act. More typical of postliberal theologies today, however, is a return to patristic and medieval hermeneutical models for reading scripture theologically, uniting historical-grammatical and spiritual-figurative-allegorical senses into a coherent and faithful understanding of Scripture. The Brazos Theological Commentary on the Bible is one example of postliberal scriptural interpretation at work.

Ronald T. Michener argues that there are five characteristics common amongst expressions of postliberal theology:

1. Non-foundationalist
2. Intra-textual
3. Socially centred
4. Respects plurality and diversity
5. Embraces a generous orthodoxy

== Criticisms ==
Critics of postliberalism often have been concerned with its "post-foundational" aspects. Similar to the criticism of postmodern philosophical systems, critics wonder how one postliberal theology can be measured up against another to determine which is better, more appropriate, closer to truth. Postliberal theology's divorcing itself from historical necessity and objective consideration is viewed negatively by many conservative Christians. Additionally, critics wonder what implications such allegedly relativistic views, such as the possibility of religious pluralism, might have for Christianity. Though influential on a generation of young pastors, the movement has had a hard time finding grass-roots support within mainline Protestant denominations, many of which face vicious liberal–conservative pressures and rifts, something the movement tends to dismiss as a sign of cultural accommodation. Some critics have suggested that because the movement has largely rejected a "mediating" theology (thus, rendering it mostly inaccessible to laypeople), it is difficult to implement its tenets on the local congregational level, so postliberalism remains largely an academic specialty, much like preceding movements such as neo-orthodoxy. Later postliberal theologies have, however, made mediation a central concern (Note: For example, see Milbank 1990.) and grassroots groups like the Ekklesia Project can be seen to cut across the face of such criticisms.

Debates have been centred on issues of incommensurability, sectarianism, fideism, relativism, truth, and ontological reference. A number of works have sought to resolve these questions to various degrees of satisfaction (Note: For example, see Pecknold 2005, Vanhoozer 2005, and DeHart 2006.) and the debates continue across the theological disciplines. Furthermore, critics have maintained that the internal coherence model postliberal theologians assume is difficult to square with developments in modern science which would seem to challenge the tenets of traditional, orthodox Christianity (e.g. the new physics, or evolution). Postliberals respond to such criticisms by arguing that they neglect the ways in which the postliberal view of doctrines as depth-grammars (inscribing the rules of the faith articulated at Nicea and Chalcedon) provide dynamic ways of relating the truths of faith to truths of scientific discovery. Likewise, Bruce D. Marshall and others have developed postliberal approaches to truth that resemble the "moderate realism" of the medieval correspondence theory of truth (e.g. Thomas Aquinas).

== See also ==
- Biblical theology
- Postmodern Christianity
- Methodological individualism – Method of analysis in social sciences
