= Charlotte von Kirschbaum =

German theologian

Charlotte von Kirschbaum (June 25, 1899 – July 24, 1975) was a German theologian who assisted Karl Barth in writing his Church Dogmatics. She was born in Ingolstadt. In 1916 her father died in the First World War, which inspired her to be trained as a nurse. In 1924 she met Karl Barth, and became his pupil; she later contributed to all of Karl Barth's academic publications. Historians have discussed at length her romantic relationship with Barth, and its possible impact on his theology. The letters between von Kirschbaum and Barth express "the deep, intense, and overwhelming love between these two human beings."

== Relationship with Karl Barth and Nelly Hoffman-Barth ==
Von Kirschbaum met Barth at the University of Göttingen in 1924, when she was 25 years old; at the time she was a Red Cross nurse with an interest in theology, and economically destitute. By 1929 she was working full-time for Barth as a secretary and assistant preparing his lectures. They developed an intimate relationship that threatened Barth's marriage. In October 1929 she moved into the Barth household, where she would live with his wife Nelly and their children until 1966. During this time, von Kirschbaum and Barth cowrote the volumes of Church Dogmatics and many other theological works; Barth's children referred to her as "Aunt Lollo". Long a matter of speculation, the relationship between Barth and Kirschbaum was confirmed by the release of many personal letters in 2017. However, even after Barth's death, Nelly continued to visit von Kirschbaum in the hospital.

== Church Dogmatics ==
Although von Kirschbaum is not listed as a co-author of Church Dogmatics, Barth admitted that it would not have been written without her. When she finally became ill and moved to hospital, he could not complete it.

In the preface to CD III/3 he wrote:

"I should not like to conclude this Preface without expressly drawing the attention of readers of these seven volumes to what they and I owe to the twenty years of work quietly accomplished at my side by Charlotte von Kirschbaum. She has devoted no less of her life and powers to the growth of this work than I have myself. Without her co-operation it could not have been advanced from day to day, and I should hardly dare contemplate the future which may yet remain to me. I know what it really means to have a helper."

== Work with Karl Barth ==
For the sake of the work she learned Latin and Greek. She was also assigned to attend the philosophical lectures of Heinrich Scholz, have an hour of discussion with him, and later relay the content thereof to Barth. Scholz made a marriage proposal to her, but she declined. She made an important contribution to the production of Barth's Church Dogmatics. In 1935 Barth moved to Basel, Switzerland, followed by Charlotte. From there they supported the German Resistance.

== Theological work ==
In 1949 her theological book Die wirkliche Frau (The Real Woman) was published. It discussed the role of women.

== End of life and burial ==
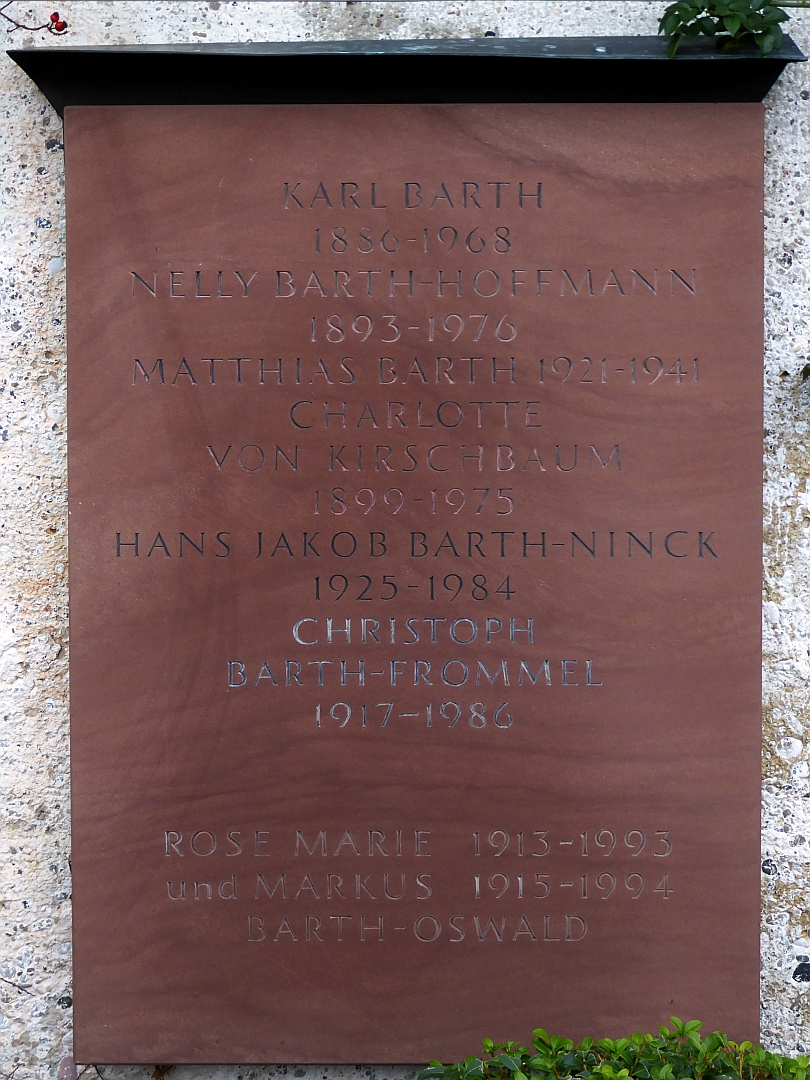
Charlotte von Kirschbaum, Hörnli Cemetery (Friedhof am Hörnli), Basel

In early 1962, Charlotte von Kirschbaum became ill and moved to a nursing home in Riehen, and was hospitalized for the rest of her life and she died thirteen years later. Nelly Hoffman buried Charlotte von Kirschbaum in the Barth family tomb where Karl Barth was previously buried and where Nelly was later buried too.

== Writings ==
- von Kirschbaum, Charlotte (1996), The Question of Woman: The Collected Writings of Charlotte Von Kirschbaum, Eerdmans, ISBN 0-8028-4142-2.

== Sources ==
- Busch, Eberhard (1975), Karl Barths Lebenslauf, nach seinen Briefen und autobiographischen Texten [Karl Barth’s biography, according to his letters and autobiographical texts] (in German), München: Christian Kaiser.
