= Karl Barth =

Swiss Protestant theologian (1886–1968)

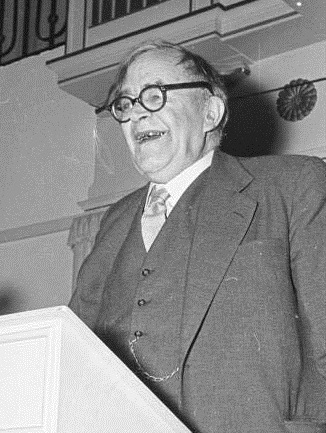
- Barth in 1956
- Born: 10 May 1886; Basel, Switzerland
- Died: 10 December 1968 (aged 82); Basel, Switzerland
- Education: University of Bern; University of Berlin; University of Tübingen; University of Marburg
- Notable work: The Epistle to the Romans; Barmen Declaration; Church Dogmatics
- Title: Theologian, professor
- Spouse: Nelly Hoffmann (m. 1913)
- Children: 5, including Markus and Christoph Barth
- Ordination: Church of Aargau (Swiss Reformed Church)
- Theological work
- Era: 20th century
- Tradition or movement: Reformed; Swiss; Dialectical theology; Confessing Church

Karl Barth (/bɑːrt, bɑːrθ/; Swiss Standard German: [bart]; 10 May 1886 – 10 December 1968) was a Swiss Reformed theologian. Barth is best known for his commentary The Epistle to the Romans, his involvement in the Confessing Church, including his authorship (except for a single phrase) of the Barmen Declaration, and especially his unfinished multi-volume theological summa the Church Dogmatics (published between 1932 and 1967). Barth's influence expanded well beyond the academic realm to mainstream culture, leading him to be featured on the cover of Time on 20 April 1962.

Like many Protestant theologians of his generation, Barth was educated in a liberal theology influenced by Adolf von Harnack, Friedrich Schleiermacher and others. His pastoral career began in the rural Swiss town of Safenwil, where he was known as the "Red Pastor from Safenwil". There he became increasingly disillusioned with the liberal Christianity in which he had been trained. This led him to write the first edition of his The Epistle to the Romans (a.k.a. Romans I), published in 1919, in which he resolved to read the New Testament differently.

Barth began to gain substantial worldwide acclaim with the publication in 1921 of the second edition of his commentary, The Epistle to the Romans, in which he openly broke from liberal theology.

He influenced many significant theologians such as Dietrich Bonhoeffer who supported the Confessing Church, and Jürgen Moltmann, Helmut Gollwitzer, James H. Cone, Wolfhart Pannenberg, Rudolf Bultmann, Thomas F. Torrance, Hans Küng, and also Reinhold Niebuhr, Jacques Ellul, and novelists such as Flannery O'Connor, John Updike, and Miklós Szentkuthy.

Among many other areas, Barth has also had a profound influence on modern Christian ethics, influencing the work of ethicists such as Stanley Hauerwas, John Howard Yoder, Jacques Ellul and Oliver O'Donovan.

== Early life and education ==
Karl Barth was born on 10 May 1886, in Basel, Switzerland, to Johann Friedrich "Fritz" Barth (1852–1912) and Anna Katharina (Sartorius) Barth (1863–1938). Karl had two younger brothers, Peter Barth (1888–1940) and Heinrich Barth (1890–1965), and two sisters, Katharina and Gertrude. Fritz Barth was a theology professor and pastor and desired for Karl to follow his positive line of Christianity, which clashed with Karl's desire to receive a liberal Protestant education. Karl began his student career at the University of Bern, and then transferred to the University of Berlin to study under Adolf von Harnack, later transferring briefly to the University of Tübingen before finally settling at the University of Marburg to study under Wilhelm Herrmann (1846–1922).

From 1911 to 1921, Barth served as a Reformed pastor in the village of Safenwil in the canton of Aargau. In 1913 he married Nelly Hoffmann, a violinist. They had a daughter and four sons, two of whom were Biblical scholars and theologians; Markus (6 October 1915 – 1 July 1994) and Christoph Barth (29 September 1917 – 21 August 1986). Karl Barth went on to become a professor of theology in Göttingen (1921–1925), Münster (1925–1930) and Bonn (1930–1935) in Germany. While serving at Göttingen he met Charlotte von Kirschbaum, who became his long-time secretary, assistant and lover; she lived in the family home for 37 years and played a large role in the writing of his epic, the Church Dogmatics. He was deported from Germany in 1935 after he refused to sign (without modification) the Oath of Loyalty to Adolf Hitler, going back to Switzerland and becoming a professor in Basel (1935–1962).

== Break from liberal theology ==
Liberal theology (German: moderne Theologie) was a trend in nineteenth and early twentieth-century Protestant theology to reinterpret traditional beliefs in two ways. First, it adopted an historical-critical approach to the sources of Christianity. Second, it engaged with the questions that science, philosophy and other disciplines raised for the Christian faith. Barth's striking out on a different theological course from that of his Liberal university teachers Adolf von Harnack and Wilhelm Herrmann was due to several significant influences and events. While Pastor at Safenwil, Barth had an influential friendship with neighbouring pastor Eduard Thurneysen. Troubled that their theological educations had left them ill-equipped to preach God's message effectively, they together engaged in an intensive quest to find a "wholly other" theological foundation than that which Schleiermacher had proposed.

In August 1914, Barth was dismayed to learn that his venerated teachers including Adolf von Harnack had signed the "Manifesto of the Ninety-Three German Intellectuals to the Civilized World". As a result, Barth concluded he could not follow their understanding of the Bible and history any longer. In 1915, Barth and Thurneysen visited Christoph Blumhardt, Leader of the Bad Boll Christian Community and Social Democratic politician. Their conversation made a deep impression on Barth. He later commented that "Blumhardt always begins with God's presence, power, and purpose," which indicates a likely influence in shaping his own theocentric starting-point. Barth also found in Blumhardt's pro-Socialist politics an inspiring encouragement for his own advocacy for the rights and unionization of Safenwil textile workers and alignment with Social Democratic values. These activities, and a public disagreement with a local factory owner, earned him local notoriety as the 'Red Pastor'.

Barth's theological response was to adopt a Dialectical approach in which he deliberately sought to interrupt and destabilize the assumptions of Liberal theology by a method of negation and affirmation. In a lecture delivered in Arau in 1916, Barth argued that "God's righteousness is revealed like a trumpet blast from another world that interrupts one's obligation to nation, and also interrupts the nurturing of religious thoughts and feelings. A 'No' to these assumptions knocks one to the floor, but a 'Yes' to God's righteousness and glory sets one on one's feet again." Although in one sense it is accurate to say that Barth's Dialectical approach sought deliberately to destabilize the assumptions of Liberal theology; in another sense it is important to acknowledge that Barth never totally repudiated the historical-critical approach to the Scriptures. In addition, he continued to engage with the questions that other disciplines raised for the Christian faith, typically responding with a robust theological and Christ-centered approach.

== The Epistle to the Romans ==
Barth first began his commentary The Epistle to the Romans (German: Der Römerbrief) in the summer of 1916 while he was still a pastor in Safenwil, with the first edition appearing in December 1918 (but with a publication date of 1919). On the strength of the first edition of the commentary, Barth was invited to teach at the University of Göttingen. Barth decided around October 1920 that he was dissatisfied with the first edition and heavily revised it the following eleven months, finishing the second edition around September 1921. Particularly in the thoroughly re-written second edition of 1922, Barth argued that the God who is revealed in the life, death, and resurrection of Jesus challenges and overthrows any attempt to ally God with human cultures, achievements, or possessions. The book's popularity led to its republication and reprinting in several languages.

== Barmen Declaration ==
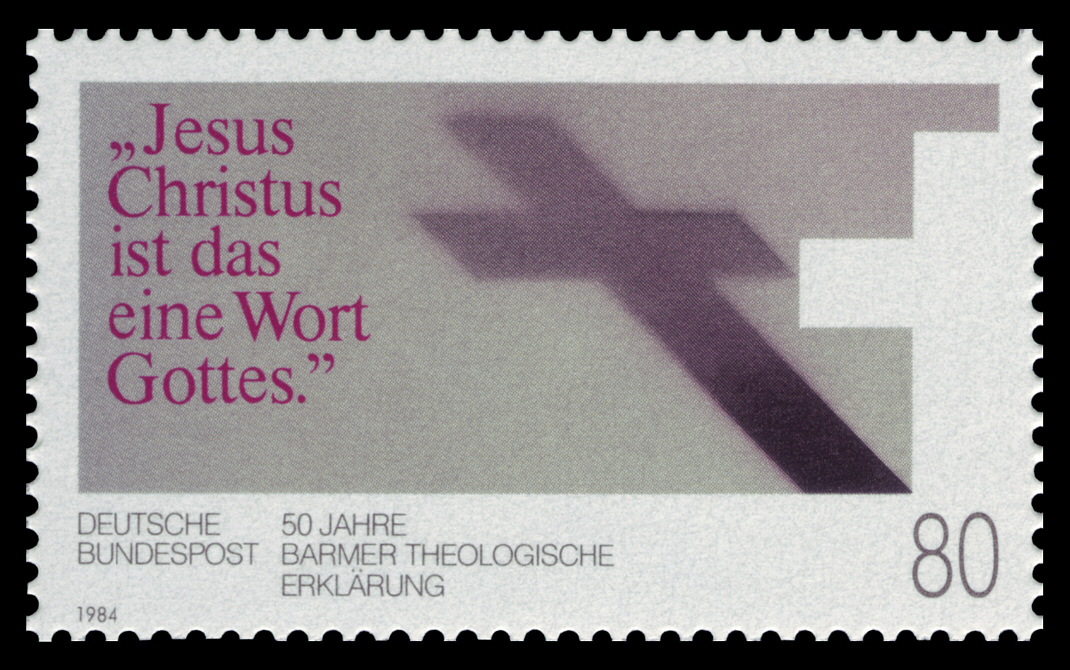
1984 West German postage stamp commemorating the Barmen Declaration's 50th anniversary

In 1934, as the Protestant Church attempted to come to terms with Nazi Germany, Barth was largely responsible for the writing of the Barmen Declaration (Barmer Erklärung). This declaration rejected the influence of Nazism on German Christianity by arguing that the Church's allegiance to the God of Jesus Christ should give it the impetus and resources to resist the influence of other lords, such as the German Führer, Adolf Hitler. Barth mailed this declaration to Hitler personally. This was one of the founding documents of the Confessing Church and Barth was elected a member of its leadership council, the Bruderrat.

He was forced to resign from his professorship at the University of Bonn in 1935 for refusing to swear an oath to Hitler. Alongside Kurt von Fritz, he was one of only two professors who refused to take the oath. Barth then returned to his native Switzerland, where he assumed a chair in systematic theology at the University of Basel. In the course of his appointment, he was required to answer a routine question asked of all Swiss civil servants: whether he supported the national defence. His answer was, "Yes, especially on the northern border!" The newspaper Neue Zürcher Zeitung carried his 1936 criticism of the philosopher Martin Heidegger for his support of the Nazis. In 1938 he wrote a letter to a Czech colleague Josef Hromádka in which he declared that soldiers who fought against Nazi Germany were serving a Christian cause.

== Church Dogmatics ==
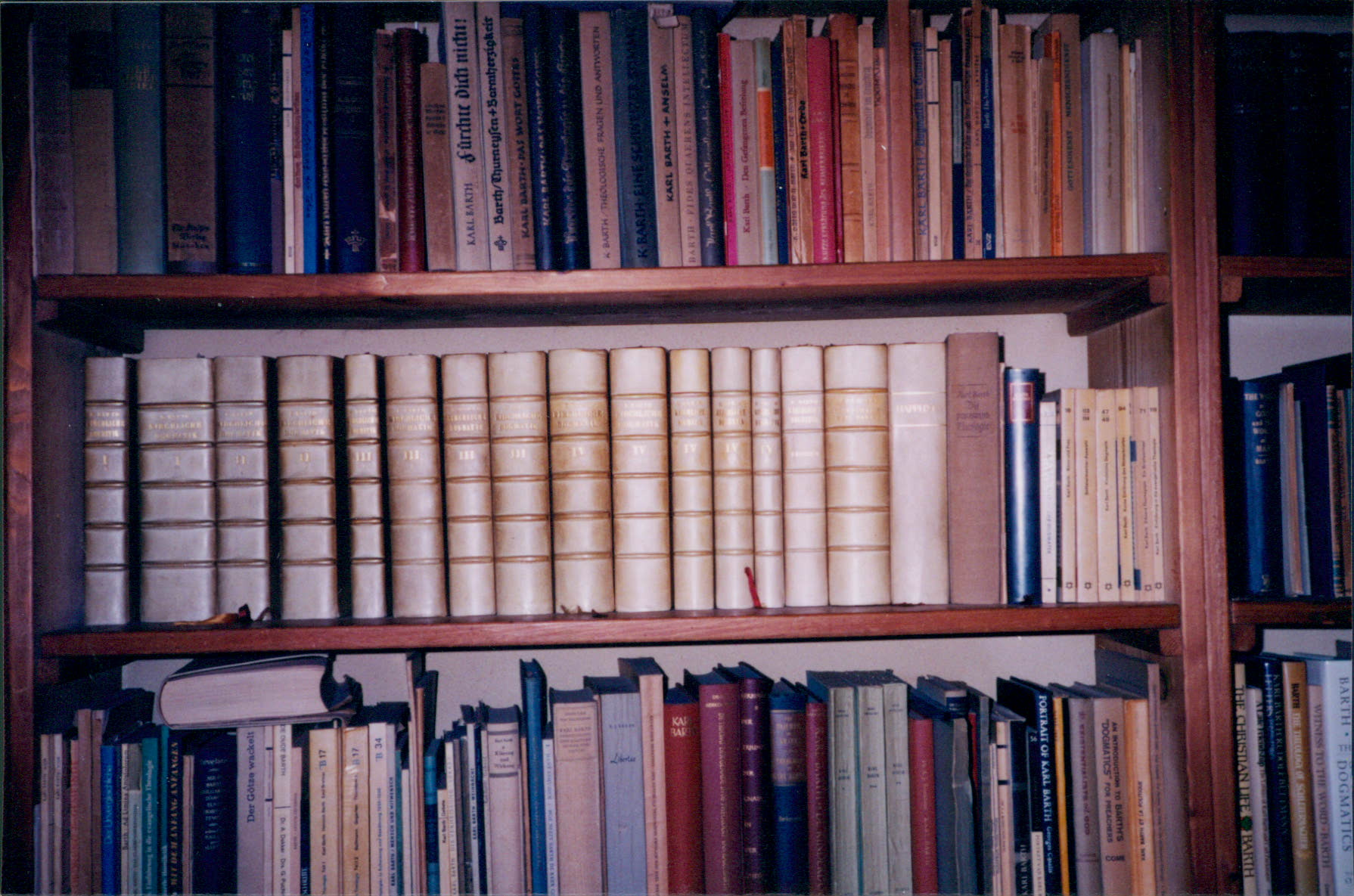
Karl Barth's Kirchliche Dogmatik: The original 'white whale' edition of the Church Dogmatics from Barth's study that features a custom binding from the publisher

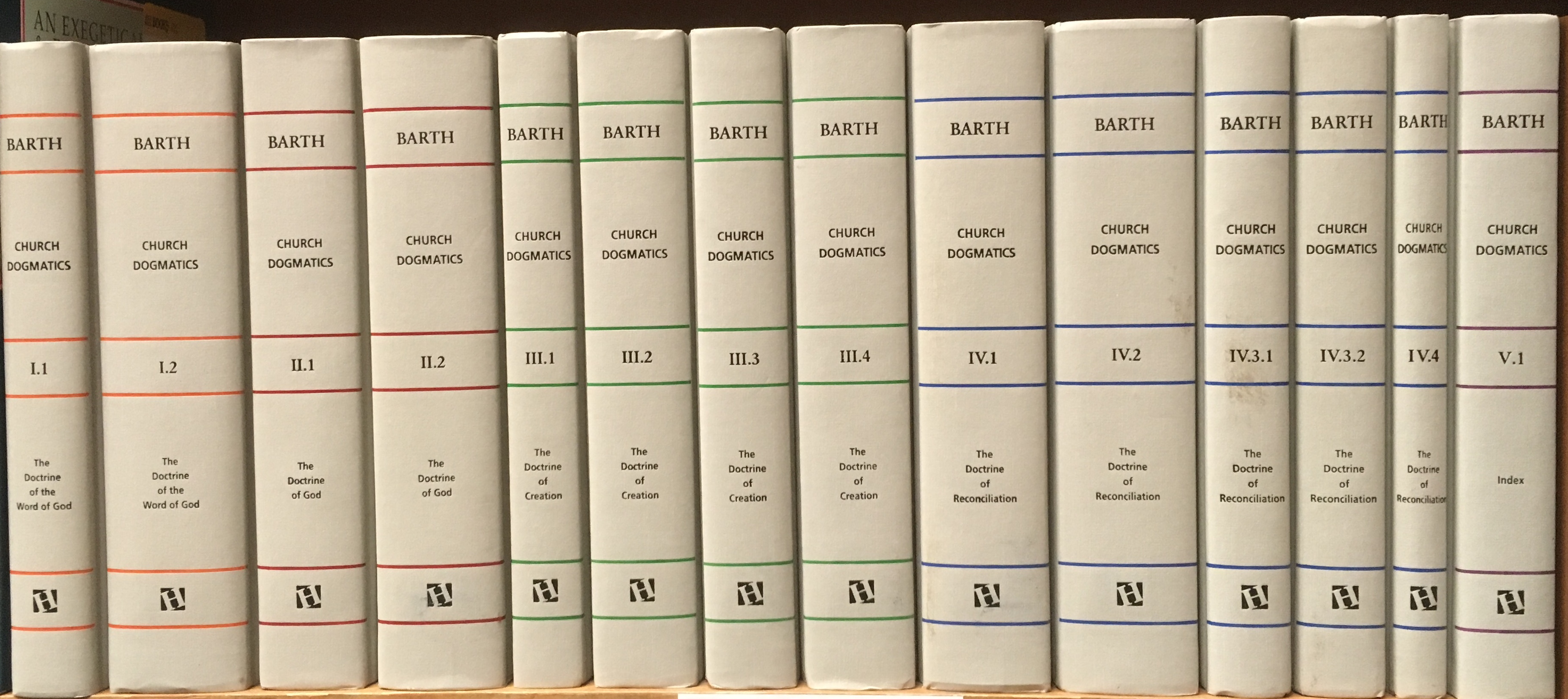
Karl Barth's Church Dogmatics in English translation

Barth's theology found its most sustained and compelling expression in his five-volume magnum opus, the Church Dogmatics (Kirchliche Dogmatik). Widely regarded as an important theological work, the Church Dogmatics represents the pinnacle of Barth's achievement as a theologian. Church Dogmatics runs to over six million words and 9,000 pages – one of the longest works of systematic theology ever written. The Church Dogmatics is in five volumes: the Doctrine of the Word of God, the Doctrine of God, the Doctrine of Creation, the Doctrine of Reconciliation and the Doctrine of Redemption. Barth's planned fifth volume was never written and the fourth volume's final part-volume was unfinished.

== Later life and death ==
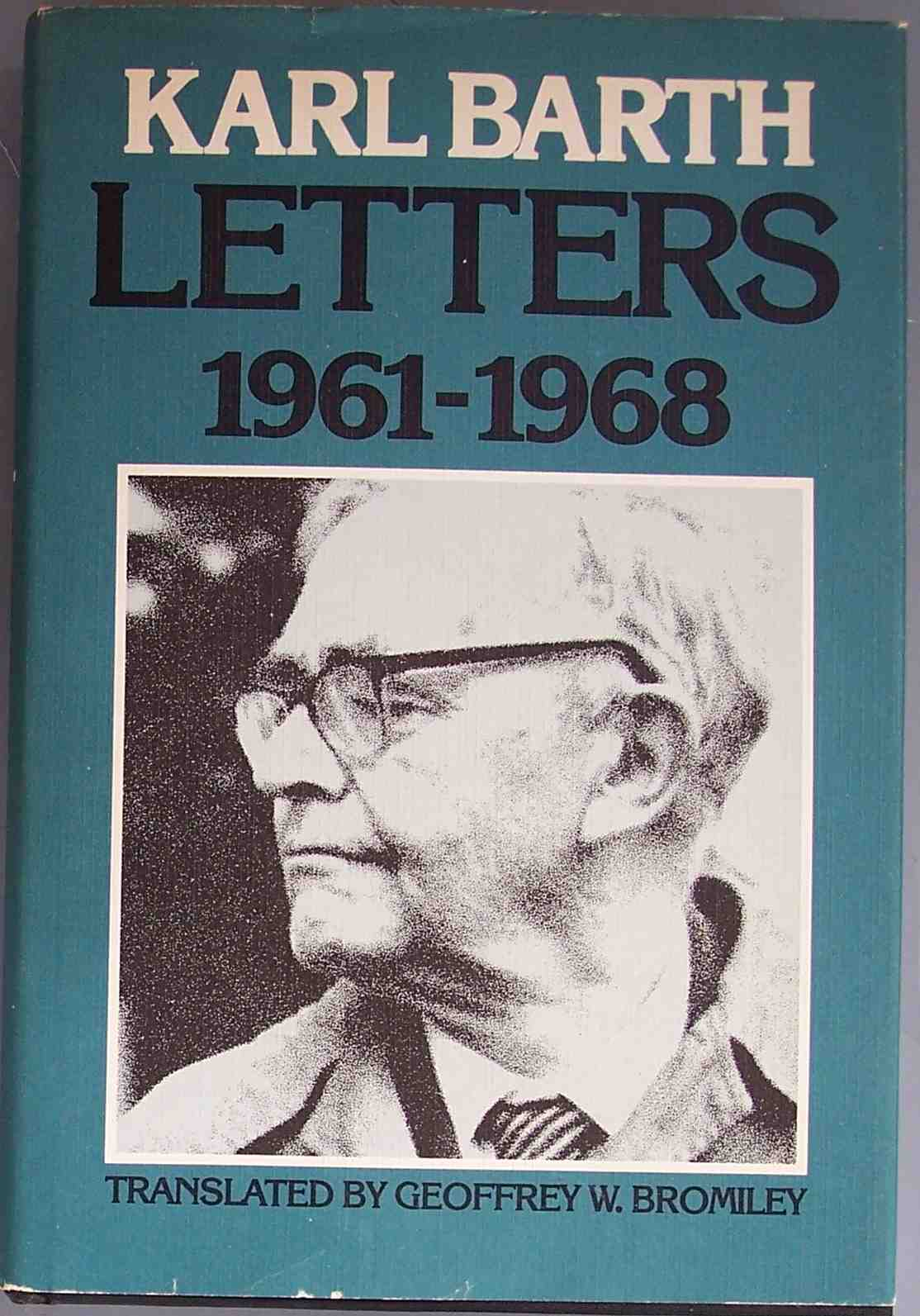
Photo of Barth on the jacket cover of Karl Barth Letters

After the end of the Second World War, Barth became an important voice in support both of German penitence and of reconciliation with churches abroad. Together with Hans Iwand, he authored the Darmstadt Declaration in 1947 – a more concrete statement of German guilt and responsibility for Nazi Germany and the Second World War than the 1945 Stuttgart Declaration of Guilt. In it, he made the point that the Church's willingness to side with anti-socialist and conservative forces had led to its susceptibility to Nazi ideology. In the context of the developing Cold War, that controversial statement was rejected by anti-Communists in the West who supported the Christian Democratic Union of Germany course of re-militarization, as well as by East German dissidents who believed that it did not sufficiently depict the dangers of Communism. He was elected a Foreign Honorary Member of the American Academy of Arts and Sciences in 1950. In the 1950s, Barth sympathized with the peace movement and opposed West German rearmament. Barth was exempted from a regulation that limited the tenure of a professorship at the University of Basel to the year they were 70 years of age, which he would have reached in 1956.

Barth wrote a 1960 article for The Christian Century regarding the "East–West question" in which he denied any inclination toward Eastern communism and stated he did not wish to live under Communism or wish anyone to be forced to do so; he acknowledged a fundamental disagreement with most of those around him, writing: "I do not comprehend how either politics or Christianity require [sic] or even permit such a disinclination to lead to the conclusions which the West has drawn with increasing sharpness in the past 15 years. I regard anticommunism as a matter of principle an evil even greater than communism itself."

In 1962, Barth visited the United States and lectured at Princeton Theological Seminary, the University of Chicago, Union Theological Seminary and San Francisco Theological Seminary. He was invited to be a guest at the Second Vatican Council. At the time Barth's health did not permit him to attend. However, he was able to visit the Vatican and be a guest of the pope in 1967, after which he wrote the small volume Ad Limina Apostolorum (At the Threshold of the Apostles).

Barth was featured on the cover of the 20 April 1962 issue of Time magazine, an indication that his influence had reached out of academic and ecclesiastical circles and into mainstream American religious culture. Pope Pius XII is sometimes claimed to have called Barth "the greatest theologian since Thomas Aquinas", though Fergus Kerr observes that "there is never chapter and verse for the quotation" and it is sometimes attributed to Pope Paul VI instead.

Barth died on 10 December 1968, at his home in Basel, Switzerland. The evening before his death, he had encouraged his lifelong friend Eduard Thurneysen that he should not be downhearted, "For things are ruled, not just in Moscow or in Washington or in Peking, but things are ruled – even here on earth—entirely from above, from heaven above."

== Theology ==
Karl Barth's most significant theological work is his summa theology titled the Church Dogmatics, which contains Barth's doctrine of the word of God, doctrine of God, doctrine of reconciliation and doctrine of redemption. Barth is most well known for reorienting all theological discussion around Jesus.

=== Trinitarian focus ===
One major objective of Barth is to recover the doctrine of the Trinity in theology from its putative loss in liberalism. His argument follows from the idea that God is the object of God's own self-knowledge, and revelation in the Bible means the self-unveiling to humanity of the God who cannot be discovered by humanity simply through its own intuition. God's revelation comes to man 'vertically from above' (Senkrecht von Oben).

=== Election ===
One of the most influential and controversial features of Barth's Dogmatics was his doctrine of election (Church Dogmatics II/2). Barth's theology entails a rejection of the idea that God chose each person to either be saved or damned based on purposes of the Divine will, and it was impossible to know why God chose some and not others.

Barth's doctrine of election involves a firm rejection of the notion of an eternal, hidden decree. In keeping with his Christo-centric methodology, Barth argues that to ascribe the salvation or damnation of humanity to an abstract absolute decree is to make some part of God more final and definitive than God's saving act in Jesus Christ. God's absolute decree, if one may speak of such a thing, is God's gracious decision to be for humanity in the person of Jesus Christ. Drawing from the earlier Reformed tradition, Barth retains the notion of double predestination but makes Jesus himself the object of both divine election and reprobation simultaneously; Jesus embodies both God's election of humanity and God's rejection of human sin. While some regard this revision of the doctrine of election as an improvement on the Augustinian-Calvinist doctrine of the predestination of individuals, critics, namely Emil Brunner, have charged that Barth's view amounts to a soft universalism, thereby departing from Augustinian-Calvinism.

Barth's doctrine of objective atonement develops as he distances himself from Anselm of Canterbury's doctrine of the atonement. In The Epistle to the Romans, Barth endorses Anselm's idea that God who is robbed of his honor must punish those who robbed him. In Church Dogmatics I/2, Barth advocates divine freedom in the incarnation with the support of Anselm's Cur Deus Homo. Barth holds that Anselm's doctrine of the atonement preserves both God's freedom and the necessity of Christ's incarnation. The positive endorsement of Anselmian motives in Cur Deus Homo continues in Church Dogmatics II/1. Barth maintains with Anselm that the sin of humanity cannot be removed by the merciful act of divine forgiveness alone. In Church Dogmatics IV/1, however, Barth's doctrine of the atonement diverges from that of Anselm. By over-christologizing the doctrine, Barth completes his formulation of objective atonement. He finalizes the necessity of God's mercy at the place where Anselm firmly establishes the dignity and freedom of the will of God. In Barth's view, God's mercy is identified with God's righteousness in a distinctive way where God's mercy always takes the initiative. The change in Barth's reception of Anselm's doctrine of the atonement is, therefore, alleged to show that Barth's doctrine entails support for universalism.

=== Salvation ===
Barth argued that previous perspectives on sin and salvation, influenced by strict Calvinist thinking, sometimes misled Christians into thinking that predestination set up humanity such that the vast majority of human beings were foreseen to disobey and reject God, with damnation coming to them as a matter of fate.

Barth's view of salvation is centrally Christological, with his writings stating that in Jesus Christ the reconciliation of all of mankind to God has essentially already taken place and that through Christ man is already elect and justified.

Karl Barth denied that he was a Universalist: "I do not believe in universalism, but I do believe in Jesus Christ, reconciler of all". However, Barth asserted that eternal salvation for everyone, even those that reject God, is a possibility that is not just an open question but should be hoped for by Christians as a matter of grace; specifically, he wrote, "Even though theological consistency might seem to lead our thoughts and utterances most clearly in this direction, we must not arrogate to ourselves that which can be given and received only as a free gift", just hoping for total reconciliation.

Barth, in the words of a later scholar, went a "significant step beyond traditional theology" in that he argued against more conservative strains of Protestant Christianity in which damnation is seen as an absolute certainty for many or most people. To Barth, Christ's grace is central.

=== Understanding of Mary ===
Unlike many Protestant theologians, Barth wrote on the topic of Mariology (the theological study of Mary). Barth's views on the subject agreed with much Catholic dogma but he disagreed with the Catholic veneration of Mary. Aware of the common dogmatic tradition of the early Church, Barth fully accepted the dogma of Mary as the Mother of God, seeing a rejection of that title equivalent to rejecting the doctrine that Christ's human and divine natures are inseparable (contra the Nestorian heresy). Through Mary, Jesus belongs to the human race. Through Jesus, Mary is Mother of God.

=== Criticism by conservative evangelicals ===
Barth's doctrine of scripture was criticised by the reformed theologians, Cornelius Van Til and Martyn Lloyd-Jones. Chapter VIII of Van Til's, Christianity and Barthianism (1962), critiques Barth's view of revelation and das Wort Gottes ('the Word of God').

German Lutheran, Helmut Thielicke criticised Barth due to his exclusion of natural anthropology.

== Charlotte von Kirschbaum ==
Charlotte von Kirschbaum was Barth's theological academic colleague for more than three decades. George Hunsinger summarizes the influence of von Kirschbaum on Barth's work: "As his unique student, critic, researcher, adviser, collaborator, companion, assistant, spokesperson, and confidante, Charlotte von Kirschbaum was indispensable to him. He could not have been what he was, or have done what he did, without her."

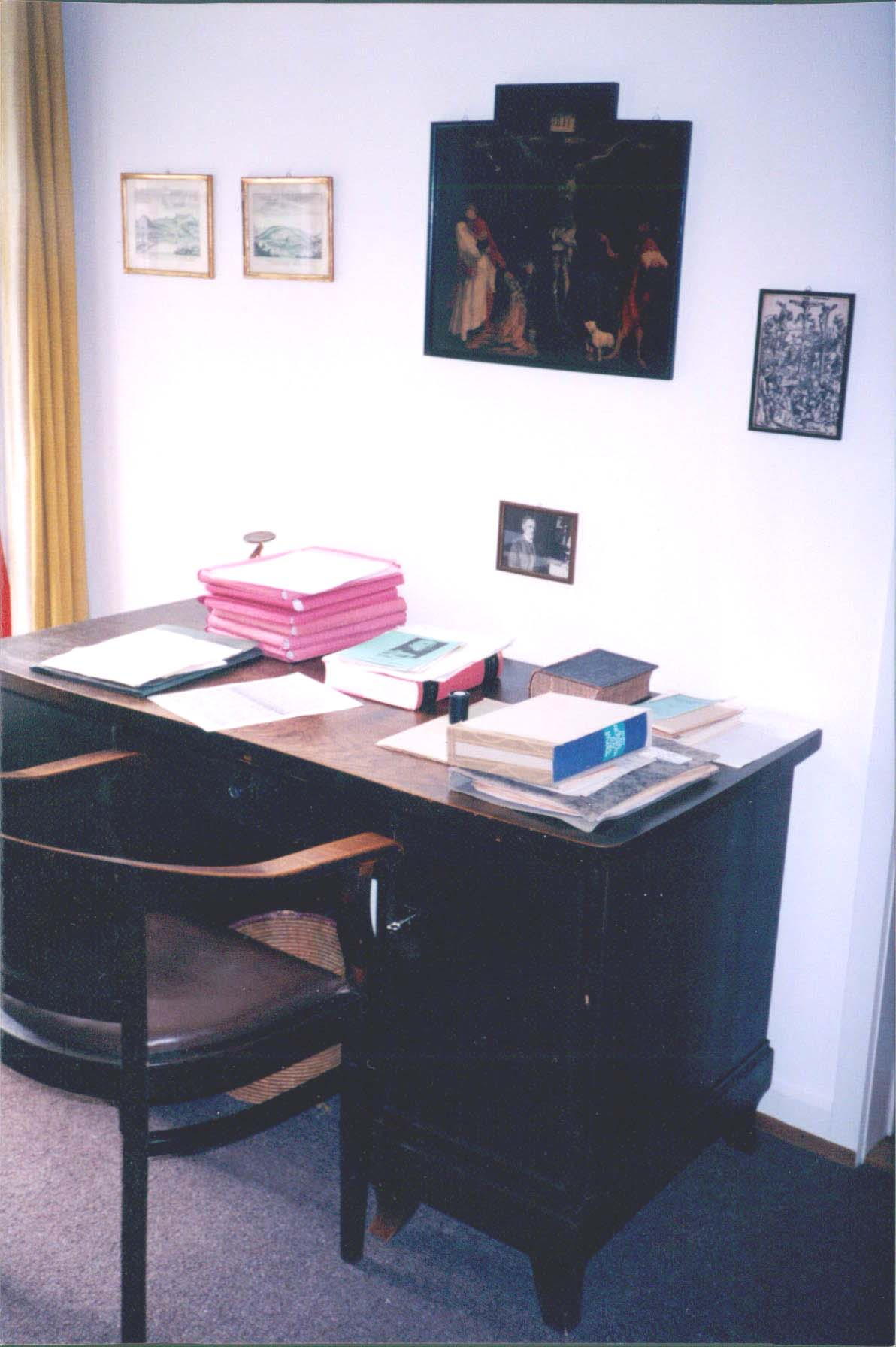
A desk in Karl Barth's old office with a painting of Matthias Grünewald's crucifixion scene

In 2017 Christiane Tietz examined intimate letters written by Barth, Charlotte von Kirschbaum, and Nelly Barth, which discuss the complicated relationship between all three individuals that occurred over the span of 40 years, released by Barth's children. The letters between von Kirschbaum and Barth from 1925 to 1935 made public "the deep, intense, and overwhelming love between these two human beings," through the lengthy period in which von Kirschbaum lived in the same house as Barth and his wife Nelly. In them, Barth describes a permanent conflict between his marriage and his affections for von Kirschbaum: "The way I am, I never could and still cannot deny either the reality of my marriage or the reality of my love. It is true that I am married, that I am a father and a grandfather. It is also true that I love. And it is true that these two facts don't match. This is why we, after some hesitation at the beginning, decided not to solve the problem with a separation on one or the other side." When Charlotte von Kirschbaum died in 1975, Barth's wife Nelly buried Charlotte in the family tomb. Nelly died the following year.

The publication of the letters in English caused a considerable crisis in English-speaking followers of Barth, who largely were not aware of the love triangle and the extent to which Barth and von Kirschbaum may not have been able to fully live according to their theological statements on marriage. Von Kirschbaum's early financial dependence on Barth has been posed as a moral problem.

== Center for Barth Studies ==
Princeton Theological Seminary, where Barth lectured in 1962, houses the Center for Barth Studies, which is dedicated to supporting scholarship related to the life and theology of Karl Barth. The Barth Center was established in 1997 and sponsors seminars, conferences, and other events. It also holds the Karl Barth Research Collection, the largest in the world, which contains nearly all of Barth's works in English and German, several first editions of his works, and an original handwritten manuscript by Barth.

== Barth's study ==
Karl Barth used to observe in his study the Crucifixion of the Isenheim Altarpiece depicting John the Baptist pointing to Jesus with his index finger and to draw inspiration for his Christocentric theology.

== Writings ==
- The Epistle to the Romans (Der Römerbrief I, 1st ed., 1919)
- The Epistle to the Romans (Der Römerbrief. Zweite Fassung, 1922). E. C. Hoskyns, trans. London: Oxford University Press, 1933, 1968 ISBN 0-19-500294-6
- The Word of God and The Word of Man (Das Wort Gottes und die Theologie, 1928). New York: Harper & Bros, 1957. ISBN 978-0-8446-1599-8; The Word of God and Theology. Amy Marga, trans. New York: T & T Clark, 2011.
- Preaching Through the Christian Year. H. Wells and J. McTavish, eds. Edinburgh: T. & T. Clark, 1978. ISBN 0-8028-1725-4
- God Here and Now. London: Routledge, 1964.
- Fides Quaerens Intellectum: Anselm's Proof of the Existence of God in the Context of His Theological Scheme (written in 1931). I. W. Robertson, trans. London: SCM, 1960; reprinted by Pickwick Publications (1985) ISBN 0-915138-75-1
- Church and State. G.R. Howe, trans. London: SCM, 1939.
- The Church and the War. A. H. Froendt, trans. New York: Macmillan, 1944.
- Prayer according to the Catechisms of the Reformation. S.F. Terrien, trans. Philadelphia: Westminster, 1952 (Also published as: Prayer and Preaching. London: SCM, 1964).
- The Humanity of God, J.N. Thomas and T. Wieser, trans. Richmond, VA: John Knox Press, 1960. ISBN 0-8042-0612-0
- Evangelical Theology: An Introduction. Grand Rapids, MI: Eerdmans, 1963.
- The Christian Life. Church Dogmatics IV/4: Lecture Fragments. Grand Rapids, MI: Eerdmans, 1981. ISBN 0-567-09320-4, ISBN 0-8028-3523-6
- The Word in this World: Two Sermons by Karl Barth. Edited by Kurt I. Johanson. Regent Publishing (Vancouver, BC, Canada): 2007
- "No Angels of Darkness and Light," The Christian Century, 20 January 1960, p. 72 (reprinted in Contemporary Moral Issues. H. K. Girvetz, ed. Belmont, CA: Wadsworth, 1963. pp. 6–8).
- The Göttingen Dogmatics: Instruction in the Christian Religion, vol. 1. G.W. Bromiley, trans. Grand Rapids, MI: Eerdmans, 1991. ISBN 0-8028-2421-8
- Dogmatics in Outline (1947 lectures), Harper Perennial, 1959, ISBN 0-06-130056-X
- A Unique Time of God: Karl Barth's WWI Sermons, William Klempa, editor. Louisville, KY: Westminster John Knox Press.
- On Religion. Edited and translated by Garrett Green. London: T & T Clark, 2006.
- "A Letter to Eberhard Bethge" (PDF), Canadian Journal of Theology, XV (3/4): 201–202, 1969

=== The Church Dogmatics in English translation ===
- Volume I Part 1: Doctrine of the Word of God: Prolegomena to Church Dogmatics, hardcover: ISBN 0-567-09013-2, softcover: ISBN 0-567-05059-9 (German: 1932)
- Volume I Part 2: Doctrine of the Word of God, hardcover: ISBN 0-567-09012-4, softcover: ISBN 0-567-05069-6 (German: 1938)
- Volume II Part 1: The Doctrine of God: The Knowledge of God; The Reality of God, hardcover: ISBN 0-567-09021-3, softcover: ISBN 0-567-05169-2 (German: 1940)
- Volume II Part 2: The Doctrine of God: The Election of God; The Command of God, hardcover: ISBN 0-567-09022-1, softcover: ISBN 0-567-05179-X (German: 1942)
- Volume III Part 1: The Doctrine of Creation: The Work of Creation, hardcover: ISBN 0-567-09031-0, softcover: ISBN 0-567-05079-3 (German: 1945)
- Volume III Part 2: The Doctrine of Creation: The Creature, hardcover: ISBN 0-567-09032-9, softcover: ISBN 0-567-05089-0 (German: 1948)
- Volume III Part 3: The Doctrine of Creation: The Creator and His Creature, hardcover: ISBN 0-567-09033-7, softcover: ISBN 0-567-05099-8 (German: 1950)
- Volume III Part 4: The Doctrine of Creation: The Command of God the Creator, hardcover: ISBN 0-567-09034-5, softcover: ISBN 0-567-05109-9 (German: 1951)
- Volume IV Part 1: The Doctrine of Reconciliation, hardcover: ISBN 0-567-09041-8, softcover: ISBN 0-567-05129-3 (German: 1953)
- Volume IV Part 2: Doctrine of Reconciliation: Jesus Christ the Servant As Lord, hardcover: ISBN 0-567-09042-6, softcover: ISBN 0-567-05139-0 (German: 1955)
- Volume IV Part 3, first half: Doctrine of Reconciliation: Jesus Christ the True Witness, hardcover: ISBN 0-567-09043-4, softcover: ISBN 0-567-05189-7 (German: 1959)
- Volume IV Part 3, second half: Doctrine of Reconciliation: Jesus Christ the True Witness, hardcover: ISBN 0-567-09044-2, softcover: ISBN 0-567-05149-8 (German: 1959)
- Volume IV Part 4 (unfinished): Doctrine of Reconciliation: The Foundation of the Christian Life (Baptism), hardcover: ISBN 0-567-09045-0, softcover: ISBN 0-567-05159-5 (German: 1967)
- Volume V: Church Dogmatics: Contents and Indexes, hardcover: ISBN 0-567-09046-9, softcover: ISBN 0-567-05119-6
- Church Dogmatics, 14 volume set, softcover, ISBN 0-567-05809-3
- Church Dogmatics: A Selection, with intro. by H. Gollwitzer, 1961, Westminster John Knox Press 1994, ISBN 0-664-25550-7
- Church Dogmatics, dual language German and English, books with CD-ROM, ISBN 0-567-08374-8
- Church Dogmatics, dual language German and English, CD-ROM only, ISBN 0-567-08364-0

=== Audio ===
- Evangelical Theology, American lectures 1962 – given by Barth in Chicago, Illinois and Princeton, New Jersey, ISBN 978-0-9785738-0-5 and ISBN 0-9785738-0-3

== See also ==
- "First they came ..."
- Frederick Herzog

== Sources ==
- "Witness to an Ancient Truth". Time. 20 April 1962. Archived from the original on 6 July 2007.
- Bradshaw, Timothy. 1988. Trinity and Ontology: A Comparative Study of the Theologies of Karl Barth and Wolfhart Pannenberg. Rutherford House Books, reprint, Lewiston; Lampeter: Edwin Mellen Press for Rutherford House, Edinburgh, 1992.
- Braaten, Carl E. (2008). That All May Believe: A Theology of the Gospel and the Mission of the Church. Grand Rapids, MI: Eerdmans. ISBN 978-0802862396.
- Bromiley, Geoffrey William. An Introduction to the Theology of Karl Barth. Grand Rapids, Mich.: William B. Eerdmans, 1979.
- Buclin, Hadrien, Entre culture du consensus et critique sociale. Les intellectuels de gauche dans la Suisse de l'après-guerre, Thèse de doctorat, Université de Lausanne, 2015.
- Busch, Eberhard. Karl Barth: His Life from Letters and Autobiographical Texts. Minneapolis: Fortress Press, 1976.
- ——— (2004), The Great Passion: An Introduction to Karl Barth's Theology, Grand Rapids, MI: William B Eerdmans.
- Chung, Paul S. Karl Barth: God's Word in Action. James Clarke & Co, Cambridge (2008), ISBN 978-0-227-17266-7.
- Chung, Sung Wook. Admiration and Challenge: Karl Barth's Theological Relationship with John Calvin. New York: Peter Lang, 2002. ISBN 978-0-820-45680-5.
- Chung, Sung Wook, ed. Karl Barth and Evangelical Theology: Convergences and Divergences. Grand Rapids, MI: Baker Academic, 2008.ISBN 978-0-801-03127-4.
- Clark, Gordon. Karl Barth's Theological Method. Trinity Foundation (1997, 2nd ed.), 1963. ISBN 0-940931-51-6.
- Fiddes, Paul. 'The status of women in the thought of Karl Barth', in Janet Martin Soskice, ed., After Eve [alternative title After Eve: women, theology and the Christian tradition], 1990, pp. 138–55. Marshall Pickering
- Fink, Heinrich. "Karl Barth und die Bewegung Freies Deutschland in der Schweiz." [Doctoral dissertation.] "Karl Barth und die Bewegung Freies Deutschland in der Schweiz : Dissertation zur Erlangung des akademischen Grades doctor scientiae theologiae (Dr.sc.theol.), vorgelegt dem Senat des Wissenschaftlichen Rates der Humboldt-Universitaaet zu Berlin." Berlin, H. Fink [Selfpublisher], 1978.
- Galli, Mark (2000). "Neo-Orthodoxy: Karl Barth". Christianity Today.
- Gherardini, Brunero. "A domanda risponde. In dialogo con Karl Barth sulle sue 'Domande a Roma' (A Question Answered. In Dialogue with Karl Barth on His 'Questions in Rome')". Frigento (Italy): Casa Mariana Editrice, 2011. ISBN 978-88-9056-111-5.
- Gignilliat, Mark S (2009). Karl Barth and the Fifth Gospel: Barth's Theological Exegesis of Isaiah. Farnham: Ashgate. ISBN 978-0754658566.
- Gorringe, Timothy. Karl Barth: Against Hegemony. Oxford: Oxford University Press, 1999.
- Hunsinger, George. How to Read Karl Barth: The Shape of His Theology. Oxford: Oxford University Press, 1993.
- Jae Jin Kim. Die Universalitaet der Versoehnung im Gottesbund. Zur biblischen Begruendung der Bundestheologie in der kirchlichen Dogmatik Karl Barths, Lit Verlag, 1992.
- Mangina, Joseph L. Karl Barth: Theologian of Christian Witness. Louisville: Westminster John Knox, 2004.
- McCormack, Bruce. Karl Barth's Critically Realistic Dialectical Theology: Its Genesis and Development, 1909–1936. Oxford University Press, USA (27 March 1997), ISBN 978-0-19-826956-4
- McKenny, Gerald. "The Analogy of Grace: Karl Barth's Moral Theology." Oxford: Oxford University Press, 2010. ISBN 0-19-958267-X.
- Oakes, Kenneth. Karl Barth on Theology and Philosophy. Oxford: Oxford University Press, 2012.
- Oakes, Kenneth. Reading Karl Barth: A Companion to Karl Barth's Epistle to the Romans. Eugene: Cascade, 2011.
- Webster, John. Barth. 2nd ed., London: Continuum, 2004.
- Webster, John, ed. The Cambridge Companion to Karl Barth. Cambridge: Cambridge University Press, 2000.
