= The Epistle to the Romans (Barth book) =

Book by Karl Barth

The Epistle to the Romans (German: Der Römerbrief) is a commentary by the Swiss theologian Karl Barth on the New Testament Epistle to the Romans.

In the summer of 1916 Barth decided to write a commentary on Paul's Epistle to the Romans as a way of rethinking his theological inheritance. Barth was a pastor in Safenwil at the time. Protestant Liberal theology had played a significant role in the rise of German nationalism prior to World War I. The first edition of the commentary was published in December 1918 (but with a publication date of 1919). It was the first edition of the work, which earned Barth his invitation to teach at the University of Göttingen and which Karl Adam said fell "like a bombshell on the theologians' playground." In October 1920 Barth decided that he needed to revise the first edition and worked for the next eleven months on rewriting the commentary, finishing around September 1921. The second edition was published in 1922 and translated into English in 1933.

This work, like many of his others, emphasizes the saving grace of God and humanity's inability to know God outside of God's revelation in Christ. Specifically, the God who is revealed in the cross of Jesus challenges and overthrows any attempt to ally God with human cultures, achievements, or possessions. While famous for its use of dialectic, some scholars have argued that Barth makes extensive use of analogy in the work as well.

== Bibliography ==
- Michael Beintker, Die Dialektik in der »dialektischen Theologie« Karl Barths: Studien zur Entwicklung der Barthschen Theologie und zur Vorgeschichte der »Kirchlichen Dogmatik «. München: Kaiser, 1987.
- J. McConnachie, "The Teaching of Karl Barth," Hibbert Journal 25 (1926–1927).
- Kenneth Oakes, Reading Karl Barth: A Companion to the Epistle to the Romans. Eugene: Cascade, 2011.
- Ingrid Spieckermann, Gotteserkenntnis: Ein Beitrag zur Grundfrage der neuen Theologie Karl Barths. München: Kaiser, 1985.
