= Markus Barth =

Swiss Protestant Reformed theologian (1915–1994)

- Born: 6 October 1915
- Died: 1 July 1994 (aged 78)
- Occupation: Biblical scholar

Academic background
- Education: Bern, Basel, Berlin, and Edinburgh
- Alma mater: University of Göttingen (Ph.D.)
- Thesis: (1947)

Academic work
- Discipline: Biblical studies
- Institutions: University of Basel, Switzerland
- Notable works: Colossians (AYB), Ephesians (AYB)

Markus Barth (6 October 1915 – 1 July 1994) was a Swiss scholar of theology. He lived in Bern, Basel, Berlin, and Edinburgh and was the son of the seminal Protestant theologian Karl Barth. From 1940 to 1953 he was a Reformed Pastor in Bubendorf near Basel. In 1947 he received a doctorate in New Testament from the University of Göttingen. Between 1953 and 1972 he held professorships in New Testament at Dubuque Theological Seminary, University of Chicago Divinity School, and Pittsburgh Theological Seminary. From 1973 to 1985 he was professor of New Testament at the University of Basel.

His three areas of interest were the sacramental understanding of Baptism and Lord's Supper, the theology of the Pauline Epistles and Jewish-Christian dialogue.

He is perhaps best known for his commentary contribution to the Anchor Bible Commentary series for which he contributed the Ephesians and Colossians volumes.

== Life ==
He was married in 1940 to Rose Marie Barth-Oswald (1913–1993). They had five children.

== Writings ==
- Conversation with the Bible. New York/Chicago/San Francisco: Holt, Rinehart, Winston, 1964.
- Rechtfertigung. Theologische Studien 90. EVZ Verlag, Zürich 1969.
  - Justification. Pauline Texts Interpreted in the Light of the Old and New Testament. Eerdmans, Grand Rapids 2006.
- Der Jude Jesus, Israel und die Palästinenser. EVZ Verlag, Zürich 1975, ISBN 978-3-290-11357-5.
  - Jesus and the Jew. John Knox Press, 1978.
- The People of God. Wipf & Stock Publishers, 1983, ISBN 1-59752-852-8.
- Das Mahl des Herrn. Gemeinschaft mit Israel, mit Christus und unter den Gästen. Neukirchener Verlag, Neukirchen-Vluyn 1987, ISBN 978-3-7887-0796-5.
  - Rediscovering the Lord's Supper. Wipf & Stock, 1988, ISBN 1-59752-851-X.
- Ephesians. Introduction, Translation, and Commentary. Anchor Bible, Vol. 34. Yale University Press 1998, two vols., ISBN 0-385-04412-7 und ISBN 0-300-13986-1.
- with Helmut Blanke: The Letter to Philemon. A New Translation with Notes and Commentary. Wm. B. Eerdmans, 2000, ISBN 0-8028-3829-4.
- The Broken Wall. A Study of the Epistle to the Ephesians. Regent College Publishing, Vancouver 2002, ISBN 1-57383-229-4.
- Israel and the Church. Wipf & Stock, 2005, ISBN 1-59752-262-7.
- with Helmut Blanke: Colossians. (= The Anchor Yale Bible Commentaries). Yale University Press, 2005, ISBN 0-300-13987-X.

== Princeton Symposium 2018 ==
The Center for Barth Studies curates Markus Barth's literary legacy in the archives and special collections of the Princeton Seminary Library.
