= National Religious Campaign Against Torture =

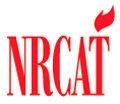
- Founded: January 2006 by George Hunsinger
- Type: Non-profit; NGO
- Location: Washington, D.C.
- Fields: Protecting and promoting human rights
- Members: 260 American Religious Organizations
- Website: www.nrcat.org

The National Religious Campaign Against Torture (NRCAT) is a U.S. non-governmental organization committed to engaging people of faith to work together to ensure that the United States does not engage in torture or cruel, inhuman, or degrading treatment of anyone, without exceptions. NRCAT's founding principles state that: "Torture violates the basic dignity of the human person that all religions, in their highest ideals, hold dear. It degrades everyone involved -- policy-makers, perpetrators and victims. It contradicts our nation's most cherished ideals. Any policies that permit torture and inhumane treatment are shocking and morally intolerable."

NRCAT's website says that the organization "mobilizes people of faith to end torture in U.S. policy, practice, and culture."

== History ==
NRCAT was created in January 2006 at the conference, “Theology, International Law and Torture: A Conference on Human Rights and Religious Commitment.” Dr. George Hunsinger of Princeton Theological Seminary convened the conference to better equip the multiple religious communities in the United States to take a more prominent role in the effort to end U.S.-sponsored torture. 150 leaders of a variety of faiths attended the Conference.

From January 2006 to May 2007, NRCAT was a project of the Churches’ Center for Theology and Public Policy, a national ecumenical research center located at Wesley Theological Seminary in Washington, D.C. In May 2007, NRCAT became an independent organization and hired Rev. Richard L. Killmer as executive director, who served in the position until December 2013. Rev. Ron Stief began as executive director in January 2014.

In December 2007, the NRCAT Action Fund, a 501(c)(4) entity, was created. The Action Fund is responsible for lobbying and election campaign activities around the issue of U.S.-sponsored torture.

In 2008, NRCAT worked urging presidential candidates, Members of Congress, the President-elect and the President himself to issue an executive order halting torture. On January 22, 2009 President Obama issued Executive Order 13491 titled "Ensuring Lawful Interrogations,” which halted U.S.-sponsored torture.

== Organization ==
NRCAT has over 300 religious organizations as members. These include: Evangelical Christians, Roman Catholics, Orthodox Christians, mainline Protestants, Muslims, Jews, Sikhs, Hindus, Baháʼí, and Buddhists. Member organizations include national denominational and faith group bodies, regional entities such as state ecumenical agencies, and local religious organizations and congregations.

Over 75,000 people of faith have endorsed one or more of NRCAT's statements or participated in its activities. NRCAT sends information about current NRCAT programs, developments in the U.S. Congress and state legislatures, and study materials, worship materials and other programs that can be used by people of faith to work to end torture.

== Current initiatives ==
Ending U.S.-sponsored torture of post-9/11 detainees forever
From its founding, NRCAT has played a significant role in working to stop U.S. torture of detainees in order to obtain information and to ensure that the country will never engage in torture again. For example, in 2008 and 2009, NRCAT joined with Evangelicals for Human Rights (now the New Evangelical Partnership) and the Center for Victims of Torture to generate support for an executive order to be issued by the President of the United States that would halt U.S. sponsored torture. NRCAT's efforts proved fruitful when President Barack Obama issued an Executive Order halting torture on January 22, 2009 that adopted many of the coalition's suggestions.

To permanently end U.S.-sponsored torture of detainees and seek accountability for past use of torture, NRCAT is asking the U.S. Department of Justice to read the Senate Intelligence Committee's Torture Report and re-open the criminal investigation into torture, working on gathering support for the McCain-Feinstein amendment to the 2016 National Defense Authorization Act that codifies the Executive Order banning torture into law, and working on closing the detention facility at Guantanamo Bay, one of the steps needed to end U.S. sponsored torture forever. Additionally, NRCAT works on increasing the number of people in the U.S. who believe that torture is always wrong- without exceptions.

Ending torture in U.S. prisons, especially the use of prolonged solitary confinement
In solitary confinement, prisoners are held alone or with another person in an 8’ x 10’, often cage-like, windowless cell for 22–24 hours per day. Some incarcerated people have been held for months, years, even decades, in complete isolation and suffer lifelong psychological and cognitive consequences. To end the use of this practice, NRCAT works to advance legislation banning solitary confinement and educate people of faith nationwide about the torture of solitary confinement through varying methods such as NRCAT's film Breaking Down the Box and its solitary confinement cell replica.

As an example of its work, NRCAT drew attention to the summer 2013 hunger strike in California prisons that protested the inhumane conditions, including confinement in long-term isolation. On Thursday, September 5, the 60th day of the third peaceful hunger strike in California prisons, the hunger strike was suspended, with California legislators vowing to take legislative action and host a series of hearings. Over 1,000 clergy and religious leaders throughout the United States supported the hunger strikers call to end torture, joining with NRCAT, the American Friends Service Committee and the Prisoner Hunger Strike Solidarity Coalition in signing "A Religious Call for a Just and Humane End to the Hunger Strike in California Prisons." The letter called on Gov. Brown to honor the hunger strikers’ five core demands in order to bring the hunger strike to a swift and humane end.

Advocating for U.S. policies that help end the use of torture by other governments
U.S. laws, policies and actions on torture have a profound impact – for better or worse – on the practices of other governments. The U.S. has had a positive influence on international efforts to prohibit torture, but has also condoned torture by foreign governments. It provides military assistance to certain foreign governments despite their use of torture, and has even provided direct support and training for foreign security forces that torture. NRCAT works to end the use of torture abroad by supporting the Leahy Law, a human rights law that restricts U.S. aid to foreign security forces (police, military, and other) that are credibly alleged to have committed gross human rights violations, like torture, rape, and forced disappearances.

Ending anti-Muslim bigotry
On September 7, 2010, NRCAT and the Islamic Society of North America organized an event with 40 national religious leaders who stated that the exponentially growing reality of anti-Muslim bigotry, like the opposition to the building of new Mosques and the threat by the pastor in Florida to burn the Qur’an, was contrary to American values and religious values. Following the meeting, the religious leaders held a press conference that included 38 television cameras and produced 200 press stories in one day. That fall "Shoulder-to-Shoulder: Standing with American Muslims; Upholding American Values" was created, in which NRCAT has played a major leadership role

To continue the efforts to end anti-Muslim bigotry, NRCAT is working to continue the partnership with Shoulder-to-Shoulder, respond to events and acts that are marked by anti-Muslim bigotry, and support religious organizations across the nation that are engaged in ending anti-Muslim sentiment.

== See also ==
- Human rights
- Enhanced Interrogation Techniques
- Moral rights
- Civil rights
- Torture and the United States
- United Nations Convention Against Torture
