= George Hunsinger =

American theologian (born 1945)

- Born: 1945 (age 80–81)
- Known for: Barthian studies
- Title: Hazel Thompson McCord Professor of Systematic Theology at Princeton Theological Seminary
- Spouse: Deborah van Deusen Hunsinger
- Awards: 2010 International Karl Barth Prize

Academic background
- Education: Yale University; Harvard Divinity School; Stanford University
- Doctoral advisor: Hans Frei

Academic work
- Discipline: Theology
- School or tradition: Postliberal theology, Barthian
- Institutions: Princeton Theological Seminary
- Main interests: Karl Barth, Ecumenical movement, Reformed Theology
- Notable works: How to Read Karl Barth: The Shape of His Theology (1991), Disruptive Grace: Studies in the Theology of Karl Barth (2001), The Eucharist and Ecumenism: Let Us Keep the Feast (2008)

George Hunsinger is an American theologian who is Hazel Thompson McCord Professor of Systematic Theology at Princeton Theological Seminary. He served as director of the Seminary's Center for Karl Barth Studies from 1997 to 2001.

== Educational background and career ==
Hunsinger graduated from Stanford University with honors in Humanities in 1967. Immediately after graduating from college, he lived and taught in Bedford-Stuyvesant in a store-front school for high school dropouts sponsored by the New York Urban League.

He then received a Bachelor of Divinity degree cum laude from Harvard Divinity School in 1971. Through the German Academic Exchange Service (DAAD) program, he spent his time in Tübingen University during 1971–1972. Hunsinger worked as volunteer teacher, Benhaven School for Autistic Children in New Haven, CT in the period of 1973–1975. After he received an MA and MPhil degree from Yale University in 1977, he served as the "Theologian in Residence " in Riverside Church Disarmament Program in NYC between 1978 and 1979.

In 1988, he finished his doctoral studies and gained his PhD under the supervision of Hans Frei in Yale University. Throughout his career his work has focused largely on the theology of Karl Barth. Hunsinger has also been associated with postliberalism. Along these lines, he is viewed as an authoritative interpreter of the work of his teacher Hans Frei.

In terms of ecclesial aspects, Hunsinger was ordained as minister in the Presbyterian Church (USA) in 1982. He also served as one of the members of a special committee of the PCUSA to write a New Presbyterian Catechism, in which he was the principal author. This catechism was approved by the 210th General Assembly of the PCUSA in June 1998. He has also been leading adult bible studies in Nassau Presbyterian Church (Princeton, NJ) starting from 1995.

=== Theological education ===
He served as the Instructor in Theology in 1979–84, and as the Assistant Professor of Theology in 1984–85 in the New Brunswick Theological Seminary, which is a seminary run by the Reformed Church in America (RCA). He then served as the Assistant Professor of Theology in 1986–88, as the Associate Professor of Theology in 1988–92, and finally as the Professor of Theology in 1992–94 in Bangor Theological Seminary, which has been closed by 2013.

Before teaching in Princeton Theological Seminary, he was the member of the Center of Theological Inquiry in between 1994 and 1997. This center was established by the Princeton Theological Seminary's Board of Trustees in 1978. He later became the director of the Center for Barth Studies of the seminary from 1997 to 2001. Since 2001 he has been the McCord Professor of Theology at Princeton Theological Seminary.

Hunsinger also served as visiting professor of Union Theological Seminary (NYC) (1979), Haverford College (1985), Andover Newton Theological School (1997-2004), Princeton University (2000)

He took the role of program chair (1997-2002) and the president (2003–present) of the Karl Barth Society of North America (KBSNA). Furthermore, he was the recipient of the 2010 Karl Barth Prize. Previous recipients include Eberhard Jüngel, Hans Küng, John W. de Gruchy, Johannes Rau, and Bruce McCormack.

=== Social involvement ===
He has a long history of anti-war and human rights activism and was also an open critic of the war in Iraq, publishing his first article against it in 2002, before the war was launched. He walked the picket lines with Cesar Chavez, worked for William Sloane Coffin Jr. at the Riverside Church Disarmament Program, and was twice arrested with Daniel Berrigan in Good Friday protests against nuclear weapons in Manhattan.

In 2006 he convened the Princeton conference at which the National Religious Campaign Against Torture was founded.

=== Voice for ecumenism ===
From 2003 to 2008 he was active in the ecumenical movement through the Faith and Order Commission and has written on issues related to ecumenism. He served as a delegate to the official Reformed/Roman Catholic International Dialogue (2011-2016), where he was instrumental in prompting the World Communion of Reformed Churches (WCRC) to affiliate with the historic "Joint Declaration on Justification" (JDDJ). He contributed to the official WCRC "signing statement" to the JDDJ, as ratified in July 2017, at the 500th anniversary of the Reformation. In the spring semester of 2019 he was a visiting professor of ecumenical theology at the Pontifical Gregorian University in Rome.

In 2016 his book The Beatitudes (Paulist Press) was awarded "First Place in Spirituality" by the Catholic Press Association of America and Canada.

== Major publications ==
- 1976. Karl Barth and Radical Politics. The Westminster Press.
- 1991. How to Read Karl Barth: The Shape of His Theology. Oxford University Press.
- 2001. Disruptive Grace: Studies in the Theology of Karl Barth. Wm. B. Eerdmans.
- 2004. For the Sake of the World: Karl Barth and the Future of Ecclesial Theology. Wm. B. Eerdmans.
- 2008. The Eucharist and Ecumenism: Let Us Keep the Feast. Current Issues in Theology, Cambridge University Press.
- 2008. Torture Is a Moral Issue: Christians, Jews, Muslims, and People of Conscience Speak Out. Wm. B. Eerdmans.
- 2015. Reading Barth with Charity: A Hermeneutical Proposal. Baker Academic.
- 2015. Evangelical, Catholic, and Reformed: Doctrinal Essays on Barth and Related Themes. Wm. B. Eerdmans.
- 2015. Conversational Theology: Essays on Ecumenical, Postliberal, and Political Themes. T&T Clark.
- 2015. The Beatitudes. Paulist Press.
- 2017. Karl Barth and Radical Politics, Second Edition. Wipf and Stock.
- 2018. Karl, Barth, the Jews, and Judaism, Wm. B. Eerdmans.
- 2018. Karl Barth: Postholocaust Theologian? T&T Clark.
- 2020. Philippians. Baker/Brazos.
- 2020. The Wiley Blackwell Companion to Karl Barth, 2 vols. Editor (with Keith L. Johnson).
- 2023. "The Legacy of Hans W. Frei." Editor. T&T Clark.
