= Church Dogmatics =

Theological work of Karl Barth

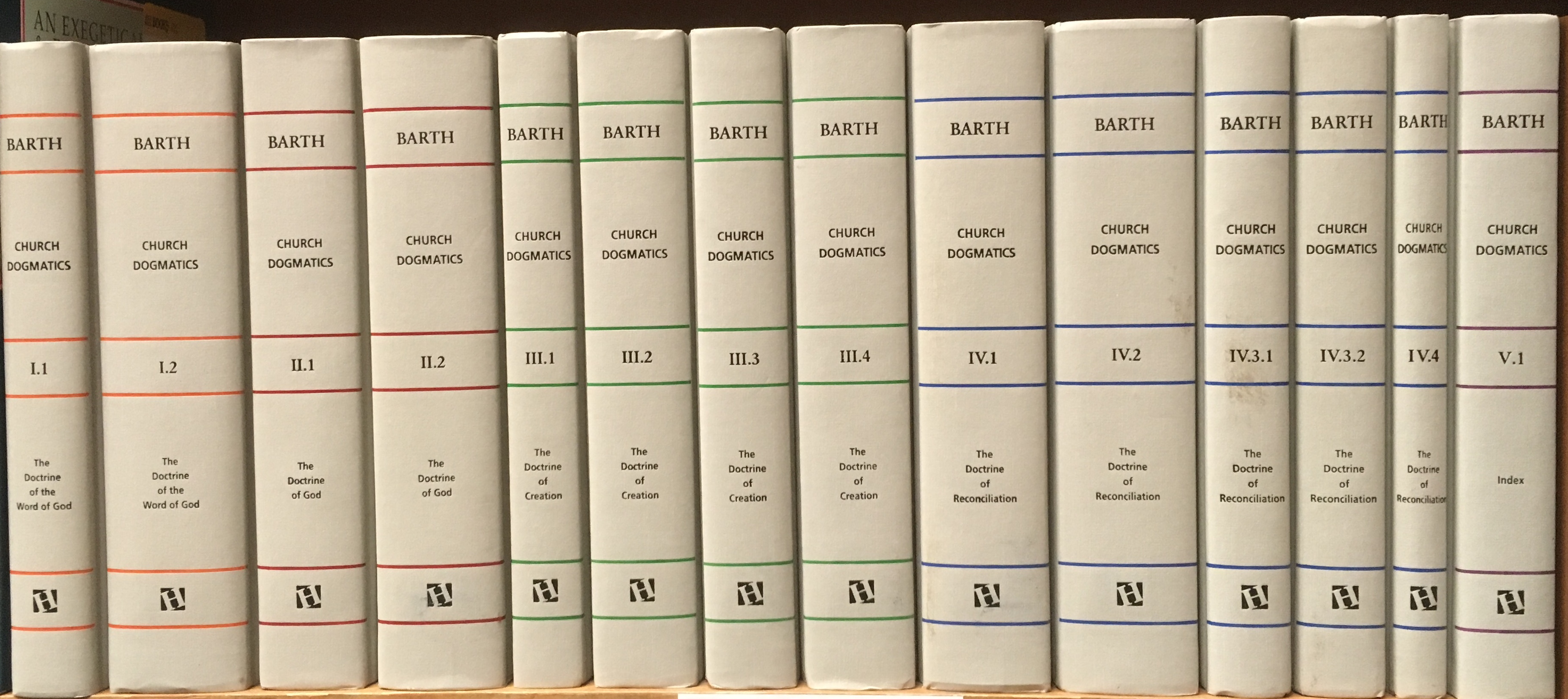
Karl Barth's Church Dogmatics

Church Dogmatics (German: Kirchliche Dogmatik) is the four-volume theological summa and magnum opus of Swiss Reformed theologian Karl Barth and was published in thirteen books from 1932 to 1967. The fourth volume of the Church Dogmatics (CD) is unfinished, and only a fragment of the final part-volume was published, and the remaining lecture notes were published posthumously. The planned fifth volume was never written.

== Academic significance ==
Widely regarded as one of the most important theological works of the century, it represents the pinnacle of Barth's achievement as a theologian. Barth published the Church Dogmatics I/1 (the first part-volume of the Dogmatics) in 1932 and continued working on it until his death in 1968, by which time it was 6 million words long in twelve part-volumes. The material published as the Church Dogmatics was originally delivered in lecture format to students at Bonn (1932) and then Basel (1935–1962), with his final incomplete volume (IV.4) produced in 1967 outside the realm of academia.

== Content ==
The Church Dogmatics is divided into five volumes: the "Doctrine of the Word of God" (CD I), the "Doctrine of God" (CD II), the "Doctrine of Creation" (CD III), the unfinished "Doctrine of Reconciliation" (CD IV) and the unwritten "Doctrine of Redemption" (CD V). The five volumes of the Church Dogmatics were published as the following part-volumes:

1. CD I/1: The Doctrine of the Word of God, Part 1: Barth lays down the foundations of undertaking such a task. In this volume he discusses the purpose and goal of the series, and the form, nature, and know-ability of the revelation. He then embarks on a thorough yet foundational exploration of the Trinity's role in the revelation of God to humanity.
2. CD I/2: The Doctrine of the Word of God, Part 2: Barth discusses the incarnation of the Word, the Spirit's particular (yet general) role therein, the nature and role of Scripture with respect to the Word, and the eager response of the Church.
3. CD II/1: The Doctrine of God, Part 1: Barth begins by presenting a foundation for the knowledge of God, followed by the reality (Being and Nature) of God.
4. CD II/2: The Doctrine of God, Part 2: In One of Barth's more notable volumes, he discusses two major topics, the Election of God and the Command of God. Inside, Barth discusses predestination, its human response, and the ontological foundations thereof.
5. CD III/1: The Doctrine of Creation, Part 1: In one of his shorter volumes, Barth discusses the relationship between Covenant and Creation as well as the purpose of Creation as God relates to humankind.
6. CD III/2: The Doctrine of Creation, Part 2: Here, Barth discusses the God-human relationship from the human point of view. He discusses such things as humanity as the covenant-partner of God, the semi-autonomous being, and the still-dependent being.
7. CD III/3: The Doctrine of Creation, Part 3: This volume dives into such issues as divine providence, God as Father and Lord, and the relationship between God and "nothingness". The volume closes by exploring the Kingdom of Heaven and its constituents.
8. CD III/4: The Doctrine of Creation, Part 4: In this volume Barth focuses much of his energy on ethical reactions to creation, exploring these inside four realms of certain human liberties: freedom before God, freedom in fellowship, freedom for life, and freedom in limitation. This volume most directly explores the actions of human beings in response to the Word of God.
9. CD IV/1: The Doctrine of Reconciliation, Part 1: One of the lengthiest of the Church Dogmatics is also considered by Barth to be the most important: "I have been very conscious of the very special responsibility laid on the theologian at this center of all Christian knowledge. To fail here is to fail everywhere." This volume sets out to discuss certain aspects of Jesus Christ's role as the servant of God. It explores Christ's obedience to God's command, the pride and fall of humankind, the justification of humankind, and the Holy Spirit's action in the ensuing Christian community.
10. CD IV/2: The Doctrine of Reconciliation, Part 2: This volume centers on the actions of Jesus Christ as servant of God and Lord of humanity. It includes such discourses as the exaltation of Christ, the sloth of humankind, the sanctification of humankind, and the Christian life in community under the Spirit. The volume ends with a deep reflection on the interaction of the Spirit with Love inside the Christian community.
11. CD IV/3: The Doctrine of Reconciliation, Part 3: This volume was printed as a two-book set commonly known as CD IV/3.1 and CD IV/3.2 respectively. CD IV/3.1 centers its efforts on Jesus Christ being the true Witness of God, and with the glory of the Mediator (Jesus Christ) and the condemnation of humanity. CD IV/3.2 continues the theme of Jesus Christ as true Witness of God. Here he discusses the particular vocation of human beings, its goal, and the Holy Spirit's part in the sending of the Christian community, and discusses Christian hope.
12. CD IV/4: The Doctrine of Reconciliation, Part 4: Also known as The Christian Life, Barth's final section consists of Christ's command for the Christian response (to salvation via Jesus Christ) as an ethical response, founded with zeal and striving for righteousness.

== Scope ==
Barth's original plan for the Church Dogmatics was as follows: "There would be [in addition to volume I.1] a second half-volume of pretty much the same size, completing the Prolegomena, the doctrine of Revelation. The second volume would contain the doctrine of God, the third the doctrine of Creation, the fourth the doctrine of Reconciliation, the fifth the doctrine of Redemption." Barth died before writing any of the fifth volume. A complete outline of the Church Dogmatics can be found in the Barth installment of the Making of Modern Theology series. The series was originally written in German and was later translated into English under the editorial leadership of T. F. Torrance and G. W. Bromiley and many others.
